= Literature of Kashmir =

Literature originating in the Kashmir region

The Literature of Kashmir has a long history with the oldest texts having been composed in the Sanskrit language. Early names include Patanjali, the author of the Mahābhāṣya commentary on Pāṇini's grammar, suggested by some to have been the same to write the Hindu treatise known as the Yogasutra, and Dridhbala, who revised the Charaka Samhita of Ayurveda.

In medieval times, philosophers of Kashmir Shaivism include Vasugupta (c. 800), Utpala (c. 925), Abhinavagupta, Kshemaraja, and Anandavardhana. Within contemporary Kashmir literature there are many poets, including Asif Tariq Bhat Tashi Shah, Akeel Mohiuddin Bhat, and Zeeshan Jaipuri.

== Kashmiri language literature ==
The below listed table marks Kashmiri language poets in chronological order as per the book— A History of Kashmiri literature by Trilokinath Raina.

Name	Years	Birthplace	Period	Remarks
Lal Ded	1320–1392	Pandrethan, or Padmanpore (modern Sempore, Pampore)	Kashmir Shaivism	She was the Kashmiri mystic poet credited with pioneering the Vaakh/Vatsun genre of Kashmiri literature.
Nund Reshi	1377–1440	Khee, Qaimoh, Kulgam	Sufism	Nund Reshi was among the founders of the Rishi order, a Sufi tradition of the region. He mainly wrote Shrukhs. His well-known disciples from this order include- Dehat Ded, Behat Ded, Shanga Bibi, Sham Ded and Ganga Bibi.
Hazrat Shaikh Yaqub Sarfi	1521–1595	Zainkadal, Srinagar	Sufism	Popularly known as "Ishan sa'eb", Sarfi was a Kashmiri Sufi Shaikh of the Kubrawi Hamadani order. He became a Hafiz Quran at the age of seven. He has many Vaakhs to his credit.
Habba Khatoon	1554–1609	Chandhur, Pampore	Lyricism	She is known to lyricize her wailing cries for lost time. The queen poet was popularly known as the "Nightingale of Kashmir".
Jumma Bibi	N/A	Nowhatta, Srinagar	Sufism and Lyricism	She was the daughter of a Kandur (baker), and was quite close to Mirza Akmal ud Din Badakshi. Her Vaakhs are mostly inspired by mystical subjects. She had also composed a Kashir marsiya (Kashmiri elegy) on the death of Mirza Kamal.
Khawaja Habibullah Ganai Nowshehri	1555–1617	Nowshera, Srinagar	Sufism	He was the main Khulafa (successor) to Hazrat Shaikh Yaqub Sarfi and was Hafiz Quran, and very much fond of singing. He had written some notable Vaakhs too.
Rupa Bhawani	1621–1721	Khanqah-i-Shokta, Nawakadal (Srinagar at present)	Kashmir Shaivism and Islamic Sufism	Her Vaakhs reveal the influence of both Kashmir Shaivism and Islamic Sufism.
Sahab Kaul	b. 1629	Habba Kadal, Srinagar	Kashmir Shaivism	His 'Krishna Avtaar Charit' is the first Kashmiri poem of Leela (Divine play) genre.
Nunda Dar	d. 1774	Village Kaathyul	Sufism	He and Mir Syed Ullah Shahabadi are the only two poets who attempted the Ghazal writing successfully before Mahmud Gami.
Arnimal	1738–1778	Palhalan, Pattan	Lyricism	She is the second poet after Habba Khatoon in the field of lyricism.
Mir Abdulla Behaqi	d. 1798	N/A	Sufism	He is the first Kashmiri poet to adopt Mathnavi (rhyming couplets) as his medium in poetry.
Shah Gafoor	N/A	Village Choon, Budgam	Lyricism	His well-known works include 'Rosh Paan Havtam Kashvaniye', 'Sorui Chu Panai Be Vanai Kya', and 'Kya Gov Malaal tes Yarsei' among others.
Momin Shah sa'eb	d. 1800	Buried at Babgom, Pulwama	Sufism	To him belongs the honour of writing the first well-received Mathnavi in Kashmiri, titled 'Mantaq-al-tayyar' based on Persian mathnavi of the same title by Attar.
Swocha Kral	1774–1854	Village Koil, Pulwama (buried at Yendregam, Pulwama)	Sufism	He was known to be the mureed (disciple) of Momin sa'eb. His poetry is an exposition of the philosophy of Wahdat-al-Wajood.
Khwaja Hussain Mir	d. 1826	Habak, Magam, buried at Gund Khawja Qasim	Devotional	Hussain Mir is regarded as the founder of the Classical Age in Kashir Marsiya, known as 'Muqam Band'.
Parmananda	1791–1864	Village Seer, Martand (Mattan at present)	Mysticism	His most notable works include 'Radha Swayamvara'.
Pandit Mirza Kak	N/A	Hangulgund, Kokernag, Anantnag	Mysticism	He had authored 'Shiv Puraan' in Kashmiri language.
Shah Qalandar	d. 1850	Haigam (Sopore), or Wahthora, Chadoora dist. Budgam	Lyricism	Known for his popular mathnavi 'Adam ta Guljaan' (love-story of faqir Adam and Princess Guljaan).
Mahmud Gami	1765–1855	Village Aravaer (modern Mahmudabad), Dooru Shahabad, Anantnag	Lyricism	Popularly known as Jami of Kashmir, he had also translated Nizami's Layla Majnun into Kashmiri titled 'Lael Majnun'.
Rahim Sopori	1775–1850	Telwaen mohallà, Sopore	Sufism	He belonged to the Qadri order of Sufism and was significantly influenced by Lal Ded and Nund Reshi. He is specifically known for using Sanskrit Shastra words in his poetry.
Mulla Munshi Mohammad Yusuf Baba	1798-1885	Babapora, Habba Kadal, Srinagar	Devotional	He is best known for his portal of human loss and grief in Kashmiri Marsiya. Munshi Yusuf remains one of the most popular Kashmiri Marsiya writers.
Mulla Hakim Muhammad Azim	1803-1852	Babapora, Habba Kadal, Srinagar	Devotional	He is known for introducing visual imagery in Kashmiri Marsiya and repositioning it in the urban, Persianate high culture associated with Srinagar city.
Mirza Aboul Qasim	d. 1853	Gund Khawja Qasim, buried Karbala, Iraq	Devotional	The most prolific and popular Marsiya writer of Kashmir Marsiyas, his works reflects deep understanding of traditional Muslim knowledge both literary as well as religious.
Munshi Safdar Khan	d. 1850s	Awadh, Uttar Pradesh	Devotional	He worked in the court of Nawab Wajid Ali Shah and is said to have been poisoned in his late 20's. He is the first poet who introduced the genre of writing 'bey-nuqta' (verses withouts any diacritical marks) in Kashmiri Marsiya, in a marsiya of bearing the same name.
Wali Ullah Motoo	d. 1858	Wuhan, Beerwah dist. Budgam	Sufism	He has written a Mathnavi based on the legend of Hemal and Nagrai.
Nyam sa'eb	1805–1865	Agh hamaam Habba Kadal, Srinagar	Lyricism	He is best known for his lyrical ghazals that have been sung by generation of Kashmiris. His Taelib (tutee) named Rasul Shah Haaqsa was the murshid (spiritual guide) to Shamas Faqir.
Abdul Ahad Nazim	1807–1865	N/A	Sufism and Lyricism	He was also known as 'Waiz Shah Nur-ud-din', considered the finest Na'at writer of Kashmir. He had penned the famous Sufi song- Yim Zaar Vanahas Bardar.
Lakshman Joo Raina Bulbul	1812–1898	Malapora, Ganderbal	Lyricism	Wrote the well-known razmia mathnavi Saamnaama, translation of Firdausi's Classic Shahnaama.
Karam Buland	d. 1899	Haanz Gund, Wahthora Budgam	Lyricism	He had great love of music, theatre and organizing musical sessions. The NGO- Karam Buland Folk Theatre Group in Budgam is also named after him.
Maqbool Shah Kralwaer	1820–1877	Kralwara, Nagam Budgam	Sufism	He is best known for his mathnavi 'Gulrez'. A mathnavi, many claim as finest descriptive poetry of the 19th-century Kashmiri literature.
Ahmad Batwaer	1838–1918	Batawara, Soura, Srinagar	Sufism	His well known works include 'Az Boaz Saeni Mudda', 'Yendraaz Zyeni Darbaar', 'Bedaar Cheshmov Dedaar' and many others.
Rasul Mir	1840–1870	Dooru Shahabad, Anantnag	Romanticism	He is popularly known as the John Keats of Kashmir. Rasul Mir formally inaugurated Ghazal into Kashmiri poetry. Gazals with rivers, valleys, birds, fruits and imagery of Kashmir are his forte.
Abdul Ahad Nadim	1842–1911	Bandipora	Lyricism	Had written the social satire Shahar'ashob.
Wahab Khar	1842–1912	Khrew, Pampore, Pulwama	Sufism	He came from a lineage of poets: his father and grandfather, both blacksmiths by profession, were also venerated Sufi poets.
Wahab Parray	1845–1914	Khos mohallà, Hajin, Bandipora	Sufism	He had translated Firdausi's 'Shahnaama' from Persian to Kashmiri in the year 1900.
Pandit Govind Kaul	1846–1899	Srinagar	Mysticism	As a profound Kashmiri scholar he had helped Aurel Stein in translating Kalhana's Rajatarangini.
Rahman Dar	d. 1897	Safa Kadal, Srinagar	Sufism	He is best known for his Mathnavi Sheeshrang.
Shamas Faqir	1849–1904	Zaindar, Srinagar	Sufism	He belonged to the Qadriya silsila of Sufism and had also written the mathnavi Mehrajnaama, recounting the Islamic prophet Muhammad's Mehraj (spiritual journey) to Allah.
Aga Sayyid Muhammad Safvi	d. 1932	Mirgund, Budgam	Religious Prose	A religious scholar by training he wrote 'Minhaj ul Salah wa Miraj al Falah', popularly known as 'Kashir Kitab' (c.1888), one of the first works in Kashmiri prose.
Pir Ghulam Mohammad Hanfi	1849–1937	N/A	Sufism	He is said to have translated Quran into Kashmiri. Some scholars believe that the Kashmiri translation of Quran which was published under the name of Maulvi Yusuf Shah was actually done by Hanfi.
Krishan Joo Razdan	1850–1925	Wanpoh, Anantnag	Kashmir Shaivism	He is known for his Shiv Puraan and Shiv Lagan.
Mulla Hakim Habib ul Lah	1852-1904	Babapora, Habba Kadal, Srinagar	Devotional Mysticism	In addition to his Persian poetry is known for his Kashmiri Marsiya, especially Yusuf. His Sahlab Nama is devoted to the tragic floods of 1903 which devastated Kashmir.
Aziz Ullah Haqqani	1854–1919	Narparistan, Srinagar	Sufism and Romanticism	He is remembered as a prominent Na'at writer. His best known mathnavi is 'Mumtaaz Benazir', which had attained the same popularity as Maqbool Shah Kralwari's Gulrez.
Saif-ud-din Ariz	N/A	Pulwama	Lyricism	His mathnavi titled Nav Bahaar, had been translated into Persian. Though, the manuscript remains undiscovered so far.
Asad Parray	1862–1930	Hajin, Bandipora	Mysticism	He was highly influenced by Hindu mythology and had written works in praise of Lord Rama and Lord Shiva.
Hakim Hassan Ali	1870–1915	Babapora, Habba Kadal, Srinagar	Devotional	A respected Marsiya writer, his Bey-Nuqta (Dotless) is considered a literary feat because in 25 verses it avoids the use of letters with any diacritical markings (nuqta).
Haji Mohammad Alyaas	1881–1941	Tsrar Sharief, Budgam	Romanticism	He had been inspired by Aziz Ullah Haqqani, and wrote his rendering of the mathnavi Mumtaaz Benazir.
Mohammad Ismail Nami	1884–1940	Kavador, Srinagar	Lyricism	He was an extensive traveller of Tibet and had written Tibet Safarnama and Nizami's Sheeren Farhad in Kashmiri.
Prakash Ram Bhat	d. 1885	Devsar dist. Kulgam	Mysticism	He is the author of the first Razmia (war) mathnavi in Kashmiri literature, 'Ramavtaar Charit', based on Ramayana.
Akbar Bhat	d. 1910	Anantnag	Sufism	He roamed as a fakir all over the valley for two years and after this peregrination wrote the poem "Saalgah".
Kaefi Shah	d. 1910	Kothar dist. Udhampur	Romanticism	Wrote a romantic mathnavi, 'Qissa Behraam Shah'
Abdul Rahim Aima	d. 1911	Nagam, Banihal	Sufism	His mathnavi 'Gulbadan' is a translation of Muhammad Ali Murad's Urdu mathnavi of the same title.
Pir Mohi-u-din Miskeen	d. 1915	Kulgam	Sufism	Had written 6 masnavis, including Yusuf Zuleikha, Zeba Nigaar and Laal Majnoon. He had also translated the popular tragic romance of Punjab, Pakistan- Sohni Mahiwal into Kashmiri.
Prakash Kurgami	N/A	Kurigam, Qazigund	Mysticism	He had translated Ramayana to Kashmiri language.
Vishna Kaul	d. 1917	Kulgam	Mysticism	He had translated Valmiki's Ramayana into Kashmiri
Haji Mohi-ud-din Miskin	d. 1921	Srinagar	Sufism	His mathnavi 'Zeba Nigaar' has been credited to Rasul Mir by Abdul Ahad Azad in Kashmiri zuban aur shairi vol.II
Asad Mir	d. 1930	Hakura Badasgam, Anantnag	Lyricism	He had written the popular ghazal Yeli Janaan Ralem. He has numerous ghazals to his credit that have been sung by generations of Kashmiris.
Abdul Qaadir Faarig	N/A	N/A	Sufism	He was the father of ex-chief minister, Ghulam Mohammad Sadiq.
Ahad Zargar	1882–1984	Narvara, Srinagar	Sufism	His well known masnavis including- 'Kaefir Sapdith Korum Iqraar', expressing the philosophy Wahadat-al-Wajood.
Zinda Kaul	1884–1965	Madanyar, Srinagar	Lyricism	He was the first Kashmiri writer who had won the Sahitya Akademi award, 1956 for his volume Sumaran (The Rosary).
Mahjoor	1887–1952	Mitrigam, Pulwama	Lyricism	Being a revolutionary poet, he is famously known as Shair-e-Kashmir.
Samad Mir	1892–1959	Haar Nambal, Narwara Srinagar	Sufism	His 'Aka Nandun' is the Kashmiri rendering of the legend of prophet Ibrahim and his son Ismael.
Lassa Khan Fida	1898–1965	Qazi mohallà, Anantnag	Sufism	At the age of 21, he wrote his first book 'Gulbakwal' which was later adapted into a TV serial.
Abdul Qadoos Rasa Javidani	1901-1980	Bhaderwah	Lyricism	He had published his Kashmiri poems under the title 'Nairang-e-Gazal'. He had also represented Kashmir at the National Mushaira in 1961. He had also penned the famous song- Mashravthas Janaan sung by Faheem Abdullah.
Abdul Ahad Zargar	b. 1908	Srinagar	Sufism	Being a disciple of Samad Mir, his expression was also multi-lingual that assimilated Arabic, Sanskrit and Persian languages and brewed them with Kashmiri language.
Dina Nath Wali Almast	1908–2006	Badyar Bala, Srinagar	Progressive movement	His collection of poetry include Bala Yapair (This side of Mountains, 1955) and Sahaavukh Posh (Desert Flowers, 1981).
Abdul Ahad Azad	1909–1948	Rangar, Chadoora, Budgam	Lyricism	He had written the essay Kashmiri zuban aur shairi.
Mir Ghulam Rasool Nazki	1910–1998	Mader, Bandipora	Sufism	His well known works include Namrodnama, a collection of 200 quatrains published in 1964.
Ali Mohammad Gilkar	d. 1976	Nowhatta, Srinagar	Sufism	He was a great spiritual leader and a great Sufi saint, and popular among masses as Woast bab or Dassil bab. He is best known for his book 'Kaleed Ludni'.
Mirza Ghulam Hassan Beg Arif	1910–2005	Anantnag	Progressive movement	Known for his satirical piece Aawaaz-i-dost. He had also translated 100 quatrains of Omar Khayyam, and Rabindranath Tagore's 'Cycle of Spring' into Kashmiri.
Dina Nath Nadim	1916–1988	Habba Kadal, Srinagar	Progressive movement	He had penned the famous folksong 'Bumbro Bumbro'. He had also written the anti-war poem 'Mae Chhum aash paghich'.
Fazil Kashmiri	1916–2004	Srinagar	Progressive movement	As a versatile poet he had proven his command or mastery in all genres of poetry – Ghazal, Nazm, Rubai, Qata, Marsiya, Munajat, Na'at, Manqabat, Leela etc.
Mohiuddin Hajni	1917–1993	Hajin, Bandipora	Progressive movement	His play 'Grees Sund Ghar' is the first play in Kashmiri language. He had translated 'Alif Layla' (One Thousand and One Nights) in Kashmiri. During his career, he criticised the political doctrine of Sheikh Abdullah, 3rd chief ministers and 2nd prime minister of Jammu and Kashmir.
Noor Mohammad Roshan	b. 1919	Khanyar, Srinagar	Progressive movement	He had translated Munshi Premchand's Godaan in Kashmiri.
Lal Aragami	1923–1988	Chattibanday Aragam, Bandipora	Sufism	His well known works include Sareth Rahbar Lobum Moula.
Abdul Khaliq Tak Zainageri	1924–1989	Hardishiva, Zaingeer Sopore	Sufism	It was in 1972 that he laid the foundation of the J & K Yateem Trust. He has also written poems for children, depicting his love for the orphans and the weak.
Sarwananda Koul Premi	1924–1990	Soaf Shalli, Kokernag Anantnag	Progressive movement	Mahjoor gave him the name "Premi" (meaning Lover) because his poetry was full of love for Kashmir.
Amin Kamil	1924–2014	Kaprin, Shopian	Progressive movement	His notable works include the collections Beyi Sui Paan and Padis Pod Tshaayi.
Arjan Dev Majboor	1924–2015	Zainpora, Pulwama	Progressive movement	He had translated Kalidas's Meghadootam into Kashmiri.
Janbaz Kishtwari	1925-1990	Dool Hasti, Chenab Valley, Kishtwar	Progressive movement	He is known for his collection of poetry 'Phalwin Sangar'. He is also known for pioneering the "Chalant" style of music in Kashmiri poetry.
Rehman Rahi	1925–2023	Wazpora, Downtown Srinagar	Progressive movement	His 'Navroz-e-Saba' had won the Sahitya Akademi award, 1961. His other notable work is a poetic collection titled 'Siyah Rood Jaeren Manz'.
Pran Kishore Kaul	1925–present	Srinagar	Modern-age	He had written the screenplay for the popular Doordarshan Television series 'Gul Gulshan Gulfaam'.
Vasudev Reh	b. 1926	Sopore	Progressive movement	He is known for his collection of poetry 'Shab Gardun' (The Night Watchman).
Vishwanath Vishwas	b. 1926	Sopore	Progressive movement	His well known poems include 'Anaady Haanz' (The Foolish Boatman).
Pushkar Bhan	1926–2008	N/A	Progressive movement	As a playwright he had collaborated 3 times with Som Nath Sadhu.
Ali Mohammed Lone	1927–1987	Drogjan, Dal Gate Srinagar	Progressive movement	He was a prominent dramatist of Kashmiri language and had written the plays Te Vyeth Rooz Pakaan, and Suyya.
Ghulam Nabi Nazir	1927–2015	Yaripora, Kulgam	Progressive movement	His well known works include 'Kashir Lukh Baath'. He had also translated Shakespeare's Othello to Kashmiri.
Ghulam Nabi Firaq	1927–2016	Naushera, Srinagar	Progressive movement	Adapted play Doctor Faustus by Christopher Marlowe into Kashmiri language.
Akhtar Mohiuddin	1928–2001	Battamalyun, Srinagar	Progressive movement	He had written the first novel in Kashmiri language, titled Dod Dag (1957), and was a prominent short story writer in Kashmiri.
Ghulam Rasool Santosh	1929–1997	Chinkral, Habba Kadal Srinagar	Kashmir Shaivism	As a poet he had been the recipient of Sahitya Akademi award for his poem Be Soakh Rooh (1978).
Prem Nath Premi	1929-2000	Srinagar	Progressive movement	He was a linguist who wrote in multiple languages including English, Hindi, Urdu, Sanskrit, Persian, and the Kashmiri language. His notable works include the leela (Divine play) dedicated to Goddess Durga titled "Durga Avtaar".
Bansi Nirdosh	1930-2001	Badyar Bala, Srinagar	Progressive movement	He was a prolific writer who wrote in Urdu, Hindi, and Kashmiri. He had written over 100 plays including 'Daenther' (Branch of pomegranate tree) and 'Vaav, Naav te Dariyaav'. As a short story writer, his well-known short stories include- Yutamat Naal Votum Damanas Tal.
Rashid Nazki	1931–2016	Bandipora	Sufism	He was the founding president of Adbee Markaz Kamraz. He had won the Sahitya Akademi award for 'Vahraat' in 1999. He had written the biography of Muhammad in Kashmiri. He had also translated Sir Allama Iqbal's Asrar-i-Khudi to Kashmiri.
Hamidi Kashmiri	1932–2018	Srinagar	Progressive movement	He had won the Sahitya Akademi award for 'Yath Miani Joye' in 2005. He had also won the Padma Shri in 2010.
Moti Lal Kemmu	1933–2018	Srinagar	Progressive movement	Being a multi-faceted artist, he had worked as a choreographer for Dina Nath Nadim's Bombur Yembarzal, and Himal Nagrai.
Naji Munawar	1933–2021	Kaprin, Shopian	Modern-age	Best known for his collection Mwokhta lar, a book of stories for children. Alongside Shafi Shauq, he had compiled the history of Kashmiri literature in a book in the Kashmiri language.
Autar Krishen Rahbar	1934–2020	Fatehkadal, Downtown Srinagar	Modern-age	He was a dramatist, and had written the famous play Badshah.
Zeba Zeenat	1934–present	Nadihal, Bandipora	Sufism	She is a mystic poet whose work is based on self-exploration.
Hari Kishan Kaul	1934–2009	Srinagar	Modern-age	He is a well-known playwright and short story writer in Kashmiri. He is best known for his play Yeli Watan Khur Chu Yevan.
Ghulam Nabi Gauhar	1934–present	Charar-e-Sharief, Budgam	Modern-age	He had written the second novel in Kashmiri language, titled Mujrim (1971).
Muzaffar Aazim	1934–2022	Gotlipora, Tangmarg	Modern-age	His notable works include three poetry books in Kashmiri and one in Urdu in addition to plays Havas ta Haasil and Nai Mout. He created the first Kashmiri Narqalam font and Gulmarg Nastaliq font.
Som Nath Sadhu	1935–1982	N/A	Modern-age	Apart from being a significant playwright, he had also won the Padma Shri (fourth highest Indian civilian award) in 1974.
Taj Begum Renzu	1935–2015	Srinagar	Modern-age	She is the first Kashmiri female fiction writer and journalist.
Ghulam Nabi Tak Naazir	1935-2015	Yaripora, Kulgam	Modern-age	He had won the Sahitya Akademi award for 'Achhre Tsange' in 1991.
Bashir Bhaderwahi	1935–present	Bhaderwah	Modern-age	He had won the Sahitya Akademi award for his literary criticism 'Jamis Ta Kasheeri Manz Kashir Natia Adbuk Tawareekh' in 2015.
Mohammad Yousuf Taing	1935–present	Shopian	Modern-age	His work, Mahjoor Shinasi (A criticism on Mahjoor) won him the Sahitya Akademi Award in 1998.
Makhan Lal Kanwal	1936-2016	Sangrama, Sopore	Modern-age	He had won the Sahitya Akademi award for 'Yath Aangnas Manz' in 2012. His other collection of poetry include "Loluk Aalav", "Douri Nahinjar", "Shehij Send", and "Wath". His notable plays include "Lokchi Kath".
Mushtaq Kashmiri	1936-2022	Kav mohallà, Khanyar, Srinagar	Resistance literature	His book 'Tohfa-e-Shaheed' is written in the memory of his son, Ahmad ul Islam, who was a militant.
Moti Lal Saqi	1936–1999	Mehnoor, Chadora, Budgam	Modern-age	He received the Sahitya Akademi award in 1981 for Mansar.
Sajood Sailani	1936–2020	Nowgam, Srinagar	Modern-age	He served as a member of Sahitya Akademi's advisory board from 1973 to 1977 and in 1990.
Chaman Lal Chaman	1937–1999	N/A	Romanticism	He had represented Kashmir at the National Conference of poets in 1960.
Makhan Lal Pandita	N/A	Poribagh, Krawoora, Shopian	Modern-age	His notable works include "Karna Phur", "Girdhab", "Rambe Ara Bathis Pyeth", "Poat Tshaay", "Barsali", "Yeli Ba Canada Gowus". He is also the writer of the longest novel written in the Kashmiri language titled "Saaz Bonyan Hund" (The Symphony of Chinars).
Hakeem Manzoor	1937-2006	Akhoon Sahib, Gojwara, Srinagar	Modern-age	Though a prominent Urdu writer, he had written some works in Kashmiri language including Mea Chu Vartav Tai (1998) and Dopmai Baale Yaaras (1998).
Ayoub Sabir	1937–present	Bugam, Kulgam	Modern-age	He is a well known Satirist. For his famed book Gulalan Shaadmani, Sabir was awarded children's best literature award by Sahitya Academy New Delhi in 2013.
Mishal Sultanpuri	1937–2020	Sultanpur, Baramulla	Modern-age	In 2009 he got the Sahitya Akademi award for his book Vont on literary criticism.
Marghoob Banihali	1937–2021	Bankoot, Banihal	Modern-age	He had returned his Sahitya Akademi award in 2015, for his Partavistan (1979), a collection of poetry.
Hriday Kaul Bharti	1937–2020	Sopore	Modern-age	He is best known for his contemporary short stories including- Doan athan hinz dastaan.
Rattan Lal Shant	1938–present	Srinagar	Modern-age	He had won the Sahitya Akademi award for his short story 'Tshen' in 2007. He is also the recipient of President's Gold medal and Nehru award.
Bashar Bashir	N/A	N/A	Moden-age	He had won the Sahitya Akademi award for 'Yiman Padan Mye Yetsaar Gotshuy' in 2010.
Ghulam Nabi Khayal	1938–present	Shal mohallà, Srinagar	Modern-age	He became the first Kashmiri writer to return the Sahitya Akademi award in 2015, for his Gashik Minaar (Luminaries), 1975.
Radhey Nath Massarat	1939-2021	Zainpora, Shopian	Modern-age	Massarat mainly wrote free verse portraying the sufferings of the people. One of his well-known poems is "Aesi Von Na Kihin".
Syed Rasool Pampur	1939-2015	Hassenpora, Bijbehara, Anantnag	Modern-age	Pampur's first collection of poetry is "Ba Gyav Kya?" (What Shall I Sing?), and his second collection of poetry is titled "Safed Sangar" (1983). His other collection of poetry is "Khanda" (Laughter) published in 1988.
Ali Mohammad Shahbaz	1939–1996	Shathgund, Handwara	Resistance literature	His literary work pictured and voiced the agony of Kashmir conflict.
Farooq Nazki	1940–present	Bandipora	Modern-age	He is the son of Ghulam Rasool Nazki.
Pyarelal Handoo	1941-2014	Chandapora, Habba Kadal, Srinagar	Modern-age	As a prominent theatre actor he is regarded as the 'Father of Monologues' in Kashmiri theatre. He has directed and produced around 3000 programmes which include a number of short films and documentaries.
Shafi Shaida	1941–2015	Akilmir Khanyar, Srinagar	Modern-age	As a prominent dramatist, he scripted 26 episodes of Habba Khatoon- the first Urdu drama from Kashmir which was broadcast on DD Kaeshur.
Omkar Nath Koul	1941–2018	Kulgam	Modern-age	He was a prominent linguist of Kashmiri language.
Zareef Ahmad Zareef	1943–present	Aali kadal, Downtown Srinagar	Modern-age	He is best known for his satirical poetry and efforts to highlight various social and political problems. He had won the Sahitya Akademi award for his work 'Tchoonch poot' (a compilation of poems and prose for children).
Somnath Zutshi	1944-2014	Srinagar	Modern-age	He had won the Sahitya Akademi award for his short story 'Yeli Fol Gaash' in 2003. He had also written a Kashmiri drama for Radio Kashmir titled 'Viji Vaav'. As a translator he had translated Franz Kafka's The Trial and Nikolai Gogol's The Inspector General to Kashmiri. He was awarded the Soviet Land Nehru award for Gogol's translation in 1974.
Anis Hamadani	N/A	N/A	Modern-age	He is particularly known for his short stories- 'Wajood te Chhai' (Existence and Shadow), 'Radio Aelaana Petha Az Taam', 'Wajoodas Nakha Chhaai', 'Su Yeli Wuchhan Oas', 'Po'z S'ad'ar te Akh Kath' and 'Buth te Zaath'.
Gulshan Majeed	1947–present	Ganderbal	Modern-age	He had written the literary criticism on Wahab Parray, Lassa Khan Fida and Lakhimanjoo Bulbul titled Na'gdi Shqar. He had also translated Albert Camus' 'The Fall' to Kashmiri.
Shahnaz Rasheed	1947–present	Nowpora, Sopore	Modern-age	He released his first book Doad Khatith Guldanan Manz (Pain concealed in flower vases) in 2006, and was highly acclaimed by critics.
Abdul Ahad Hajini	1948–present	Hajin, Bandipora	Modern-age	He had won the Sahitya Akademi award for his collection of short stories 'Akh Yaad Akh Qayamat' in 2019.
M. K. Raina	1948-2026	Srinagar	Modern-age	M. K. Raina has contributed to the Kashmiri language as a lexicographer, editor, writer and translator since 1989. He has written short story collections like Patsch (2004), Pentachord (2005) and Tsók Módúr (2014).
Bimla Raina	N/A	Qarfalli mohalla, Srinagar	Modern-age	Bimla was highly influenced by the poetry of Lal Ded and mainly wrote vaakhs. Her first collection of 298 vaakhs "Reshy Maalyun Myon" was published in 1998. Her second collection of vaakhs "Vyeth Maa Thami" was published in 2002.
Rafiq Raaz	1950–present	Srinagar	Modern-age	He is the author of Arooz Kashir Zaban (Prosody of Kashmiri language).
Ali Mohammad Sheerazi	1950–present	Kralwari, Chadora, Budgam	Modern-age	He is a well known poet. His known books include Tamseel Aadam, Wouth Sangar Fulli, and Yaddi Vitur. Sheerazi is a Sarparstay Aala of Aazad Cultural forum Chadora which was founded by Moti Laal Saqi.
Shafi Shauq	1950–present	Harwan, Srinagar	Modern-age	Shauq received the Padma Shri award in 2026. He is the author of Kaesher Lugaat (Dictionary of Kashmiri language). He translated Leo Tolstoy's short novel 'The Death of Ivan Ilych' to Kashmiri.
Mohi-ud-Din Reshi	1951–present	Srinagar	Modern-age	He won the Sahitya Akademi award for his collection of short stories 'Aina Aatash' in 2013.
Naseem Shafaie	1952–present	Srinagar	Modern-age	She is the first Kashmiri women to win the Sahitya Akademi award for her work 'Na Thsay Na Aks' (Neither Shadow Nor Reflection) in 2009. She also won the Tagore literature award in 2009 for this work.
Basheer Asrar	1953–2021	Malaknag, Anantnag	Modern-age	He is the founder of 'The District Cultural Association Anantnag'
Bashir Dada	1953–present	Anantnag	Modern-age	He is a prominent theatre actor, screenwriter and poet. His notable literary works in Kashmiri language include 'Zarum Na Doorer' and 'Kar Mokli Safar'. He had also represented Kashmir in National Symposium of Poets 2009, Bhubaneshwar with his Kashmiri poem titled 'Yath Varee Andar'.
Wali Mohd Aseer Kashtawari	1954–present	Berwar, Kishtwar	Modern-age	He had won the Sahitya Akademi award for his literary criticism 'Tawazun' in 2021.
Yaqoob Dilkash	1954–2023	Shishgari Mohalla, Khanyar, Srinagar	Modern-age	He was an eminent Radio playwright, director and actor. His notable works include 'Mallekhush watte zaroor', 'Band Makanas Manz', 'Ratte Mongul', 'Zulmaat' etc.
Ghulam Ahmad Najar	1954–present	Najar Mohalla, Tekipora, Lolab Valley, Kupwara	Sufism	He has many Sufism books to his credit, but notably his book "Jaam-i-Arifayan" is the most comprehensive collection.
Sohan Lal Kaul	1955-present	Parnewan, Budgam	Modern-age	He is one of the most significant authors of Kashmiri language and literature. Essentially a novelist, a playwright, short story writer and a critic. His noteworthy novels are "Panien Panien Gunah", "Ded", "Pasiek Dar", and "Yotam Sarie Paeth Gow". In 2026, he authored Kashmir's first queer novel titled "The American Dream".
Piarey Hatash	N/A	Anantnag	Modern-age	He is particularly known for his Nazm 'Aes Bayo Naeb Nishanay Rov' that had featured in the documentary Jashn-e-Azadi: How We Celebrate Freedom (2007) by Sanjay Kak. He has also translated many short stories from Dogri language to Kashmiri.
Shad Ramzan	1956–present	Kulgam	Modern-age	He had won the Sahitya Akademi award for 'Kore Kaakud Gome Pushrith' (2014).
Aadil Mohi-ud-din	N/A	Sumbal, Bandipora	Modern-age	He had received the Sahitya Akademi award for his literary criticism titled- Zol Dith Sadras (2016).
Aziz Hajini	1957–2021	Hajin, Bandipora	Modern-age	He was the former Secretary of Jammu Kashmir Academy of Art Culture and languages (JAACL).
Shamshad Kralwari	N/A	Kralwara, Nagam, Budgam	Modern-age	He is a distinguished Kashmiri poet, broadcaster, and translator. He had served as the former director of Radio Kashmir Srinagar. As a translator, he had done the translation of Fyodor Dostoevsky's 'Crime and Punishment' in Kashmiri titled— Jurm te Saza (2015).
Majrooh Rashid	1958–present	Arwani, Vejibror Anantnag	Modern-age	Being a poet, he also a critic and translator. He has authored the books- 'Asri Kashir Shairi' (1995), 'Zaban Te Adab' (2007), 'Kashiri Shairi Hund Intikhab' (2010) etc. He is also the author of the monographs on Asad Mir and Lassa Khan Fida published by the Sahitya Akademi. As a translator he had translated Franz Kafka's 'The Judgement' into Kashmiri.
Mushtaq Ahmad Mushtaq	1961–present	Budgam	Modern-age	He had won the Sahitya Akademi Award for his collection of short stories 'Aakh' in 2018.
Farooq Fayaz	N/A	N/A	Modern-age	He had won the Sahitya Akademi award for his literary criticism 'Zael Dab' in 2022.
Sajad Inquilabi	1964–present	Khudwani, Kulgam	Modern-age	His debut collection of poetry was 'Poushgound' (Bucket of Flowers). When he wrote this, he was just 14.
Madhosh Balhami	1965–present	Balhama, Pampore Pulwama	Resistance literature	He is particularly known for his recitation of elegies composed for the funerals of militants in Kashmir. On 15 March 2018, he lost his house and thirty years of written poetry to a fire in the middle of a gun battle between Indian Army and Militants.
Gulab Saify	1966–present	Kishtwar	Triyout literature	Being a poet, he is also a critic. He is particularly known as the takhleeqkaar (pioneer) of Triyout genre of literature from Jammu and Kashmir, and the only writer who writes in this genre from the state. His well known works from this genre include 'Lal Chowk', 'Haar' etc. The well known Kashmiri song 'Taqdeer' sung by Ishfaq Kawa has also been penned by him.
Zareefa Jan	1966–present	Poshwari, Sonawari Bandipora	Sufism	Her poetic world is as fascinating as her mystifying appearance. Her poetry treasure includes a few of her notebooks filled with circles. Those circles or codes can be read by her only.
Riyaz Anzoo	N/A	Bijbehara, Anantnag	Modern-age	His notable ghazals include- 'Myon Dill Wadnovthan' and 'Watan Waalyo Watan Wapas Tarakhna'.
Sunita Raina Pandit	1967–present	Anantnag	Modern-age	Her well known works include "T'chhopi Hindi Aalaw" (The Call of Silence). Her other published Kashmiri books are 'Rihij Yaad', 'Suanzal', 'Pott Zooni Vathith', 'Mann Sar Tsyunum', 'Lalli Hindi Maaline Zaayun Lob' and 'Shuri Lyye'.
Haleema Qadri	1972–present	Churmujur, Budgam	Sufism	In 2015, she had self-published her collection of poetry, titled Ishq-e-Nabi.
Arshad Mushtaq	1974–present	Srinagar	Modern-age	He is considered as a prominent director in Kashmiri language theatre. His well known adaptations of foreign plays or literary works include- Su Yee; based on Samuel Beckett's Waiting for Godot, and Aalav; based on John Millington Synge's Riders to the Sea. He wrote his first original play- Be'chus Shahid (I am witness) in remembrance of Agha Shahid Ali.
Shabir Hussain Shabir	1975—present	Khairkoot, Nowgam, Banihal	Modern-age	His collection of poetry include- Gash Paghuk, Warqan Chikhrith Gaash, and Wadi-e-Chenab tehzeeb-o-saqafat.
Nisar Azam	1977–present	Dangiwotsh, Rafiabad Baramulla	Modern-age	He released his first book Patti Leji Zoon Daras (Then the Moon's eyes froze), for which he bagged his first Sahitya Akademi Award in 2011. He has also translated many books and his works have been highly acclaimed by critics.
Nighat Sahiba	1983–present	Anantnag	Modern-age	She had won the Sahitya Akademi Yuva Puraskar for her Zard Paniek Daer (2017).
Shabir Magami	1984–present	Magam, Budgam	Modern-age	Being a poet, he is also a translator and critic. Some of his well known Ghazals that have been sung by Grammy award nominee Qaiser Nizami include- 'Maani Sir Saev Preth Isharan Manz', 'Mae Chu Phairan Choan', 'Phyur Loag Soacha Siparan' etc.
Sofi Ghulam Mohd	1986–present	Charari Sharief	Modern-age	A critic, short-story writer, translator. He is also the author of 'Sadre Tchakis tal', 'Wande Bavath', 'Sari Harf', 'Pragash' etc.
Rumuz-e-Bekhudi	N/A	Srinagar	Modern-age	As soon as she devoted herself to poetry writing, her verses reflected self-reliance, empowerment, and struggle amidst the valley's strife backdrop.
Asif Tariq Bhat	2000–present	Duderhama, Ganderbal	Modern-age	He is the author of Kashmiri novel 'Khawaban Khayalan Manz' (2022).

The use of the Kashmiri language began with the work Mahānaya-Prakāsha by Rājānaka Shiti Kantha (c.1250), and was followed by the poet Lalleshvari or Lal Ded (14th century), who wrote mystical verses in the vaakh or four-line couplet style. Another mystic of her time equally revered in Kashmir and popularly known as Nund Reshi wrote powerful poetry. Later came Habba Khatun (16th century) with her own style. Other major names are Rupa Bhavani (1621–1721), Paramananda (1791–1864), Arnimal (d. 1800), Mahmud Gami (1765–1855), Rasul Mir (d. 1870), Maqbool Shah Kralawari (1820–1877). Also, the Sufi poets like Shamas Faqir, Wahab Khar, Soch Kral, Samad Mir, and Ahad Zargar. Among modern poets are Ghulam Ahmad Mahjoor (1885–1952), Abdul Ahad Azad (1903–1948), and Zinda Kaul (1884–1965).

During the 1950s, a number of well educated youth turned to Kashmiri writing, both poetry and prose, and enriched modern Kashmiri writing by leaps and bounds. Among these writers are Dinanath Nadim (1916–1988), Amin Kamil (1923–2014), Sarwanand Kaol Premi (1924–1990), Rehman Rahi (born 1925), Ghulam Nabi Firaq (1927–2016), Ali Mohammed Lone (1928–1987), Akhtar Mohiuddin (1928–2001), Ali Mohammad Shahbaz, Avtar Krishen Rahbar (born 1933), Sajood Sailani, Som Nath Zutshi, Muzaffar Aazim. Some later day writers are Hari Kishan Kaul, Majrooh Rashid, Rattanlal Shant, Hirdhey Kaul Bharti, Omkar N Koul, Roop Krishen Bhat, Rafiq Raaz, Tariq Shehraz, Shafi Shauq, Showkat Shehri, M.H Zaffar, G.M Azad, Anis Hamdani, Barkat Nida, Shafi Sumbli, Bashar Bashir, Shenaz Rashid, Shabir Ahmad Shabir, Shabir Magami, Tariq Ahmad Tariq, and Moti Lal Kemmu.

Contemporary Kashmiri literature appears in such magazines as "Sheeraza" published by the Jammu & Kashmir Academy of Art, Culture and Languages, "Anhar" published by the Kashmiri Department of the Kashmir University, and an independent magazines/portals like "The Kashmir Tales". "Mountain Ink", Inverse Journal Neab International Kashmiri Magazine published from Boston, Vaakh (published by All India Kashmiri Samaj, Delhi) and Koshur Samachar (published by Kashmiri Sahayak Sammiti, Delhi).

== Ancient writers in Sanskrit ==
- Charaka, c. 300 BC. One of the most important authors in Ayurveda.
- Nagasena, c. 2nd century BC. One of the major figures of Buddhism, his answers to questions about the religion posed by Menander I (Pali: Milinda), the Indo-Greek king of northwestern India (now Pakistan), are recorded in the Milinda Pañha.
- Tisata, c. 500 AD. A medical writer.
- Jaijjata, 5th century, a medical writer and probably the earliest commentator (known) on the Sushruta Samhita, later quoted by Dalhana.
- Vagbhata, c. 7th century. Considered one of the 'trinity' (with Charaka and Sushruta) of Ayurveda.
- Bhamaha, c. 7th century
- Ravigupta, 700–725. "Ravigupta is, perhaps, the earliest among the Buddhist philosophers of Kashmir..."
- Anandavardhana, 820–890
- Vasugupta, 860–925
- Somananda, 875–925
- Vatesvara, b. 880, author of Vaṭeśvara-siddhānta.
- Rudrata, c. 9th century
- Jayanta Bhatta, c. 9th century
- Bhatta Nayaka, c. 9th-10th century, considered by Sheldon Pollock to be the greatest author on aesthetics in the pre-modern period
- Medhātithi, c. 9th-10th century, one of the most influential commentators of the Manusmriti
- Utpaladeva, 900–950
- Abhinavagupta, c. 950–1020
- Vallabhadeva, c. 10th century. Wrote, amongst other works, Raghupanchika, the earliest commentary on the Raghuvamsa of Kalidasa.
- Utpala, c. 10th century. An important mathematician.
- Kshemendra, c. 990–1070
- Kshemaraja, c. late 10th century/early 11th century
- Somadeva, c. 11th century
- Bilhana, c. 11th century
- Kalhana, c. 12th century
- Jalhana, c. 12th century, the author of Mugdhopadesa (not to be confused with Jalhana who commissioned the Suktimuktavali)
- Sarangadeva, c. 13th century. A musicologist, he wrote Sangita Ratnakara, one of the most important text when it comes to Indian music.

== Writers in Persian ==
After Sanskrit and before the coming Urdu, because of the adoration and patronising policy of Persian culture by the Mughals, Persian became the literary language also of the region. Kashmir was very richly represented in that tradition, as already before the end of the 18th century "Muhammad Aslah's tazkira of the Persian-writing poets of Kashmir, written during the reign of the Mughal emperor Muhammad Shah (1131-61/1719-48), alone lists 303 poets". Late scholar from Pakistan, Pir Hassam-ud-Din Rashidi, edited, translated, and enlarged this work later, and had it published by the Iqbal Academy.

The most famous of them was Muhammad Tahir Ghani (d. 1669), better known as Gani Kashmiri, whose poetry was recently translated into English, for the first time, by Mufti Mudasir Farooqi and Nusrat Bazaz as 'The Captured Gazelle' in the world-renowned Penguin Classics list. Ghani influenced many generations of Persian-and Urdu writing poets in South Asia including Mir Taqi Mir, Ghalib and most importantly, Iqbal. Ghani's "forte" lies in creating delightful poetic images, usually by stating an abstract idea in the first hemistich and following it up with a concrete exemplification in the other. He also stands out for his multi-layered poems, which exploit the double meaning of words.

Another name in the field of Persian-language writers from Kashmir is Shaykh Yaqub Sarfi Kashmiri (1521–1595), a 16th-century Sufi poet-philosopher who was internationally acknowledged and who had for students, amongst others, well-known religious scholar Ahmad Sirhindi (more particularly, he taught him hadith) and Persian-language poet Mohsin Fani Kashmiri (d. 1671 or 1672) (himself the teacher of Ghani Kashmiri and author of the pivotal work of comparative religion, the Dabestan-e Mazaheb).

Other of the well-known and influential Persian-language poets of Kashmir would include

- Habibullah Nowshehri (1556–1617)
- Mirza Dirab Big Juya (d. 1707)
- Gani Kashmiri (1630–1669)
- Mirza Beg Akmal Kamil (1644–1718)
- Muhammad Aslam Salim (d. 1718)
- Mulla Muhammad Taufiq (1765)
- Muhammed Azam Didamari (d. 1765)
- Mulla Muhammad Hamid (1848)
- Birbal Kachru Varasta (d. 1865)
- Pandit Taba Ram Turki (1776–1847), who was a celebrity as far as Central Asia.

== Writers in Urdu ==
Despite being a numerically small community, the Kashmiri Pandits are influential in their contribution to Urdu literature. One important early example is Daya Shankar Kaul Nasim (1811–1845), a renowned Urdu poet of the 19th century, and hundreds of others followed his path.

Some eminent Urdu literary personalities of Kashmiri origins (from both the Valley and the diaspora) include (in chronological order):

- Mir Tafazzul Hussain Khan Kashmiri (1727–1800), originally from Kashmir, born in Sialkot where his parents moved and himself based in Lucknow where he served as Prime Minister (or diwan) to the Nawab of Oudh Asaf-ud-Daula thanks his erudition. He was called "khan-e-allama" (the Scholarly Khan) due to his deep scholarship on many subjects but is best known today for having translated Sir Isaac Newton's Philosophiæ Naturalis Principia Mathematica from Latin into Arabic.
- Mufti Sadruddin Khan 'Azurda', 1789–1868, apart from being the Grand Mufti of Delhi, he was also a personal friend to Ghalib (whose own mother was from Kashmir) and himself a poet of note in Urdu as well as in Arabic and Persian. He also wrote a tazkira (biographical anthology of poets).
- Momin Khan Momin, 1801–1852, considered one of the three pillars of the Delhi school of Urdu poetry, with Ghalib and Zauq. Other fields where he was competent included mathematics, geomancy, astrology, chess or music.
- Daya Shankar Kaul Nasim, 1811–1845
- Ratan Nath Dhar Sarshar, 1846–1903
- Muhammad Iqbal, 1877–1938
- Agha Hashar Kashmiri, 1879–1935 (called "the Shakespeare of Urdu" for his works as playwright)
- Brij Narayan Chakbast, 1882–1926
- Aziz Lucknawi, 1882–1935
- Khalifa Abdul Hakim, 1896-1959 (a philosopher who has the honour of writing the only book on the metaphysics of Persian mystical poet Jalaluddin Rumi)
- Patras Bokhari, 1898–1958
- Ghulam Mustafa Tabassum, 1899–1978
- Muhammad Din Taseer, 1902-1950 (short-story writer, literary critic and Iqbal scholar. Father of slain Pakistan's Punjab governor Salman Taseer and first individual from the Sub-continent to get a PhD in English Literature from Cambridge University)
- Shaikh Abdullah, 1905–1982
- Meeraji, 1912–1949
- Saadat Hasan Manto, 1912–1955
- Agha Shorish Kashmiri, 1917–1975
- Syed Akbar Jaipuri (Mujahid-E-Urdu), 1923–1998
- Razia Butt, 1924–2012
- Anwar Shemza, 1928–1985
- Hakeem Manzoor, 1937–2006, prominent urdu writer, poet and administrator.
- Obaidullah Aleem, 1939–2008
- Muhammed Amin Andrabi, 1940–2001, a scholar who belonged to the Traditionalist School of metaphysics, inspired by authors like Ibn Arabi, Muhammad Iqbal, Frithjof Schuon, Seyyed Hossein Nasr and Henry Corbin.
- Allama Mustafa Hussain Ansari, 1945–2006
- Abid Hassan Minto
- Muhammad Asim Butt, novelist, translator and critic.
- Muhammad Younis Butt, writer of the most popular political satire show in Pakistan, Hum Sub Umeed Se Hain
- Rasheed Amjad
- Shahid Nadeem

== Writers in Hindi ==
- Amar Nath Kak
- Chandrakanta (author)
- Omkar N. Koul

== Writers in English ==
- I. K. Taimni
- M. P. Pandit, prolific writer who authored some 150 books and as many articles exposing in English the thought of Sri Aurobindo.
- Chiragh Ali, reformist Islamic scholar
- Taufiq Rafat, called the 'Ezra Pound of Pakistan' for both his innovative writings and his position as one of - if not the - greatest English-language poets of Pakistan.
- Jawaharlal Nehru
- Vijaya Lakshmi Pandit
- Krishna Hutheesing
- Gopi Krishna
- Subhash Kak
- Nayantara Sahgal
- M.J. Akbar
- Hari Kunzru
- Kailas Nath Kaul
- Salman Rushdie
- Agha Shahid Ali
- Mirza Waheed
- Nitasha Kaul
- Basharat Peer
- Adeeba Riyaz
- Khalid Bashir Ahmad

== See also ==
- List of Kashmiri poets
- List of topics on the land and the people of Jammu and Kashmir
- Kashmir Shaivism
- Kashmiriyat
