= Mahmud Gami =

Kashmiri poet

- مَحموٗد گٲمی
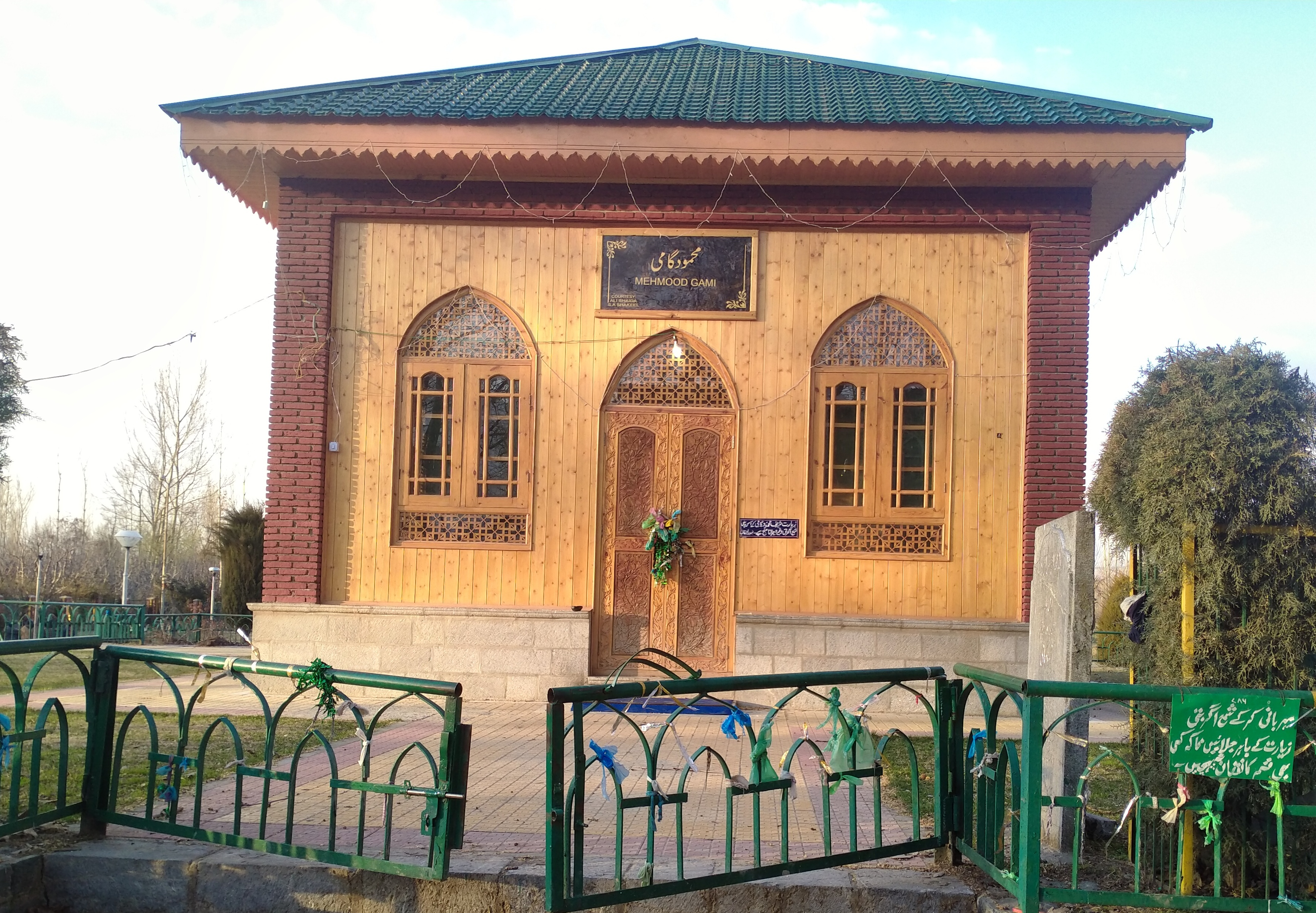
- Mausoleum of Mahmud Gami

Personal life
- Born: c. 1765 Aravaer (now Mahmudabad), Doru Shahabad, Anantnag, Kashmir
- Died: 1855
- Resting place: Mehmood Gami Park, Mahmudabad, Doru Shahabad, Anantnag, Kashmir
- Notable work(s): Lael Majnun, Yusuf-Zuleikha, Shirin-Khusrao, Sheikh Sana'n, Qisa-i-Haroon Rashid, Mansoor Nama, Qisa-i-Sheikh Mansoor, Qisa-i-Mahmud Ghaznavi, Paheel Nama, Yek Hikayat
- Education: Persian literature
- Occupation: Poet

Religious life
- Religion: Islam
- Movement: Sufism, Romanticism

Muslim leader
- Influenced by: Muhammad • Mir Sayyid Ali Hamadani • Jami • Nizami Ganjavi • Habba Khatoon • Nund Rishi • Attar
- Influenced: Mahjoor • Maqbool Shah Kralawari • Rahman Rahi

Mahmud Gami (Kashmiri pronunciation: [mahmuːd̪ ɡəːmiː] was a nineteenth-century Kashmiri poet from Doru Shahabad, Anantnag, Kashmir. Mahmud Gami is one of the most prominent Kashmiri poets of the medieval period. Through his poetic compositions he is well known to introduce Persian forms of Masnavi and Ghazal, to the Kashmiri language. He is popularly known as the Jami of Kashmir.

== Poetry ==
Kulliyat-i-Muhmud Gami (collected works of Mahmud Gami) published by the Jammu and Kashmir Academy of Art, Culture and Languages includes the following:

- Vatsun and Ghazal— 112 in number
- Mathnavi— 10 in number
- Nazm— 19 in number
- Na'at— Eulogies of the Islamic prophet Muhammad
- Persian and Hindi— 27 in number
- Miscellaneous— 5 songs

== Adapted works ==
Many of Mahmud Gami's adapted works have been adapted from Persian literature. Examples are:

- Lael Majnun — based on Laila-Majnoon of Nizami
- Yusuf-Zuleikha — based on the Mathnavi of Abdur-Rehman Jami.
- Shirin-Khusrao — based on the Mathnavi of the same name by Nizami Ganjavi
- Sheikh Sana'n — drawn from the Mathnavi Manteq-ut-Tair of Farid-ud-Din Attar
- Qisa-i-Haroon Rashid
- Mansoor Nama
- Qisa-i-Sheikh Mansoor
- Qisa-i-Mahmud Ghaznavi
- Paheel Nama
- Yek Hikayat

== Bibliography ==
- Kulliyat-i-Muhmud Gami (1977) by Naji Munawar
- Mahmud Gami (1991) by Muzaffar Aazim
- Aslobiyat (Mehmud Gami ta Rasul Mir), Mohammad Shahban Nurpuri, 1997.
- Yusuf's Fragrance: The Poems of Mahmud Gaami (2022) by Mufti Mudasir

=== Translated work ===
- Yusuf-Zulaikha (Latin) [1895] by Karl Friedrich Burkhard published in Zeitschrift der Deuschen Morgan-Landischen Gesellschaft.

== Legacy ==
In 1877, after sketching the royalty of the Kingdom of Jammu and Kashmir, while on his way back, at Thanna Mandi, a place near Rajouri, in the afternoon of 13 June, V. C. Prinsep (1838-1904) met a traveling Kashmiri bard, a singing fakir, who regaled him with Kashmiri songs for hours while they walked. Prinsep made some notes, and later got two of the songs translated.

In his book ‘Imperial India; an artist’s journals’ (1879), V. C. Prinsep writes:

He was a filthy object, the dirtiest of the dirty; but he had the soul of a poet, and as he played his poor four-stringed instrument, he threw his head on one side, and bent over his guitar, much as first-rate performers do at home. He was grateful too, for when I left at 5 a.m., I found him waiting, and he played to me along a couple of miles of road, with his dirty legs keeping time to the twang of his music, and his nose well in the air neither would he leave until I gave hookham or permission.

My good friend Major Henderson [C.S.I., who was political officer in Kashmir, and an excellent linguist.] has sent me translations of two of this poet’s songs. One appears to be well known as the love-song of Mohammed Gami, a Kashmir poet.

[...]

I should like to have imported my poet as he appeared to me in his rags and filth; yet is his love-song much like such as are sung in the drawing-rooms of Belgravia. The second song is another love-song, and the name of the poet is not known.

As is turns out, the second song is from work called "Sheikh Sana’n", a version of which among others was put to Kashmiri verses by Mahmud Gami.

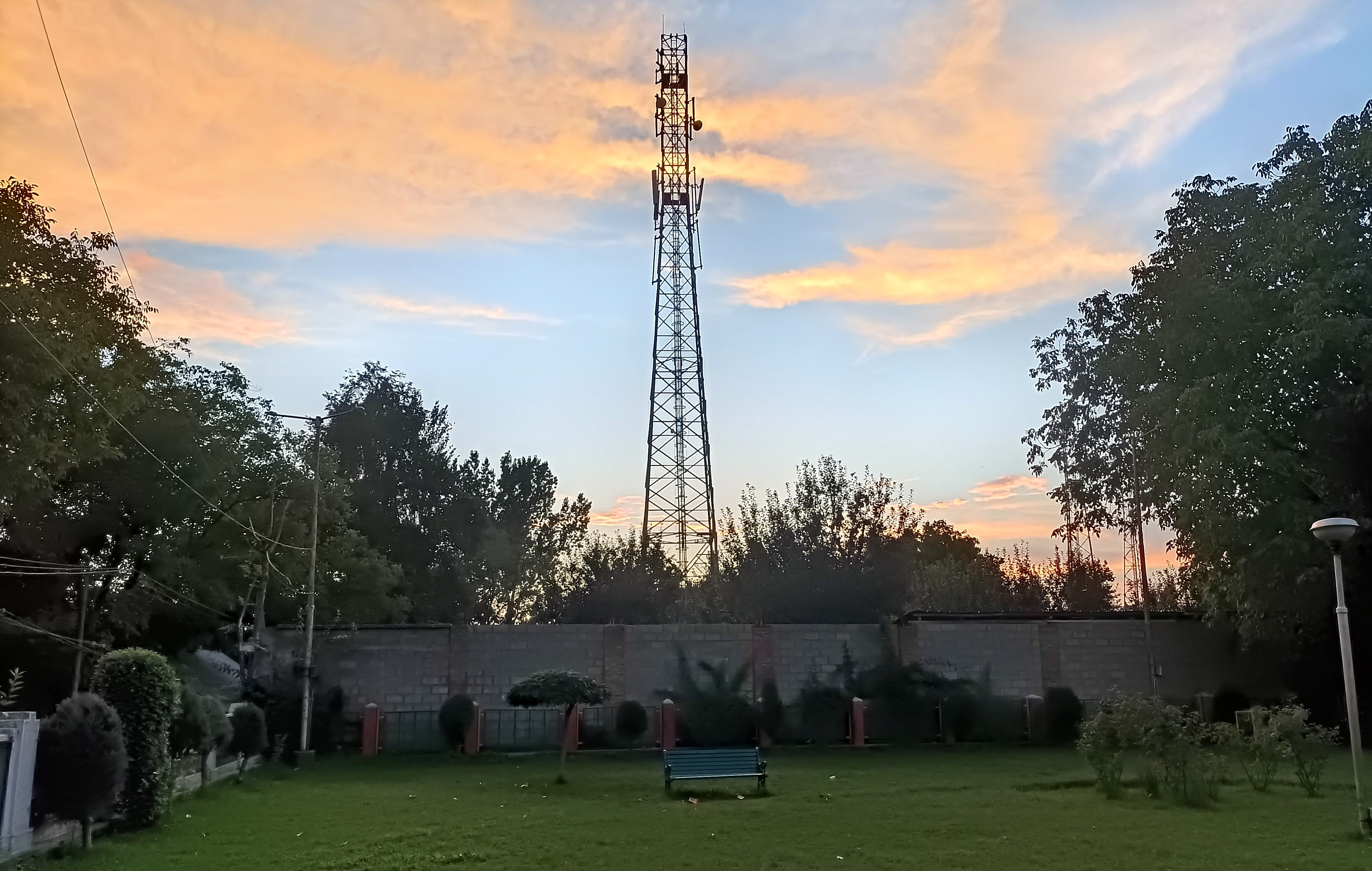
A view of Mahmud Gami park

In August 2022, the Jammu and Kashmir Academy of Art, Culture and Languages, and the union territory's department of tourism, together with the district administration of Anantnag and Mahmud Gami Working Committee, organised a cultural program in Gami's memory at Mahmud Gami park, in Dooru.

== See also ==
- Kashmiri literature
- Rasul Mir
