= Dheeba Nazir =

Indian Kashmiri writer (born 1988)

- Born: 1988 (age 37–38); Srinagar, Jammu and Kashmir, India
- Occupations: Teacher at Delhi Public School, Srinagar; Writer

Dheeba Nazir (born 1988) is a Kashmiri-language writer hailing from Srinagar, Jammu and Kashmir, India. She got Yuva puruskar Sahitya Akademi Award for her book Zareen Zakham.

Dheeba holds post-graduation in Kashmiri literature, Urdu literature, and in education. She also has done her research on Rupa Bhawani (17th-century mystic poet). She is married and has one son and two twin daughters.

== Awards ==
- Sahitya Akademi Award
