= Ghulam Nabi Firaq =

Kashmiri poet, writer, educationist

Professor Ghulam Nabi Firaq
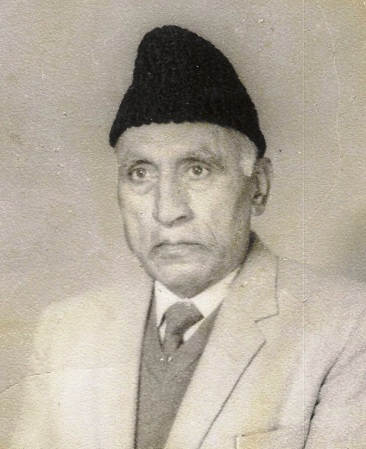
- Professor Ghulam Nabi Firaq
- Born: 15 July 1927 (age 99)
- Died: 17 December 2016 (aged 89); Naushera Srinagar, Kashmir
- Occupations: Philosopher, Poet, essayist, writer, translator, literary critic and educationist

Professor Ghulam Nabi Firaq (15 July 1927 – 17 December 2016) was a Kashmiri poet, writer and an educationist.

As an educationist he tried his best to reach all sections of society to help them in uplifting their educational standards. He was co-founder of Standard Public High School (a group of Educational Institutions), established in 1975.

== Literary work ==
=== Translation and adaptation ===
1. Adapted Play Le Bourgeois gentilhomme (The Bourgeois Gentleman) by Moliere into Kashmiri entitled "Dyar-e-Khowja".
2. Adapted play Doctor Faustus by Christopher Marlowe into Kashmiri language.
3. Has translated number of Literary essays and short stories from English language into his mother tongue- Kashmiri.
4. Has translated scores of poems from English, Urdu, Bengali, French, German, Greek and Persian and some other Indian languages into Kashmiri language.

== Memberships ==
=== Has been ===
1. Member Advisory Board of Cultural Academy, Srinagar (J & K) for Kashmiri
2. Bhartiya Ganpeth, New Delhi
3. Sahitya Akademi, New Delhi
4. Doordarshan Advisory Committee
5. Secretary of Writers'Wing of the Cultural Conference, J & K State
6. Founder Member of Koshur Markaz, J & K State
7. Member of the Kashmiri Language Script Improvement Committee, formed by J & K Government.

=== Honours ===
1. Sadiq (Ex-chief Minister) Memorial Award.
2. Life Achievement Award by J & K Academy of Art, Culture & Languages.
3. By the State Academy of Arts, Culture and Languages in a specially organised programme "Meet the Eminent" in 1995.
4. With "Khilat-i-Hajini" by the Literary organisation of repute-Halq-e-Adab Sonawari.
5. Doordarshan Delhi (National Programme) produced and telecast a special programme on the personality under its special series "Kavi Aur Kavita".
6. Doordarshan Srinagar has produced and telecast number of Programmes on the life and achievements of Prof Firaq from time to time. Besides it has produced, recorded and telecast an Archival programme on the life & achievements of the Poet in 1994.
7. Radio Kashmir Srinagar has produced and broadcast number of programmes on the life and achievements of the poet from time to time. Besides, it has recorded an archival programme on the life and achievements of the personality.
8. Commercial Broadcasting service of All India Radio, Srinagar also produced and broadcast a special programme on the life and achievements of Prof Firaq.

== Publications ==
Has written, broadcast, telecast and published scores of articles and more than one dozen books on Kashmiri Language and Literature. A brief summary of the same is as under:

=== Books published before 1989 ===
1. Yim Sane Aalave (Collection of poems) in collaboration.
2. Vyur: Kashmiri translation of poems of S.Nandan Path in collaboration.Published by Academy of Art, Culture and Languages, Srinagar
3. Nav-Shar-e-Sombrun(edited & compiled) published by University of Kashmir
4. Adbi-Istallah (A dictionary of Literary terms, published by University of Kashmir)
5. Kath Insan-e-Sinz(Story of Man) published by State Board of School Education

=== Books published after 1989 ===
1. Sada-Te-Samandar (Collection of poems) –Sahitya Akademi Award Winner
2. Rang Nazran Hind(Translation of famous poems of English, Urdu, Bengali & Persian) Publisher University of Kashmir
3. Wudav Fikri Hund: Literary Criticism
4. Parnai –Pate (Critical Literary Essays)
5. Su Akh Sada Te- (Poems in Kashmiri)
1. The History of Kasmiri Poem- Vatsun

=== Books under print ===
1. Dazwun Naar (A Long elegy on the death of his spouse)
2. Kher-ul-Bashar(A Collection of Naitya Poems)
3. An Anthology of Poems & Ghazals
4. Dr. Faustus-(Translation)

=== Journals and magazines edited ===
1. The Pratap Magazine of Government S P College Srinagar (Kashmiri Section)--For seventeen years.
2. The Kong Posh(Urdu)--Bimonthly
3. The Koshur Samut Member Editorial Board
4. The Tawi Magazine of G.G.M. Science College Jammu (Urdu Section)

The Jammu and Kashmir Academy of Art, Culture and Languages has published a journal entitled Firaq Number. Academy officials visited him at his residence and presented Sheeraza of his life and works. It has been based on the essays written by different critics and scholars on the life, achievements and critical analysis of the works of Prof. Ghulam Nabi Firaq in the field of language, literature and education.

== See also ==
- List of Sahitya Akademi Award winners for Kashmiri
- Ghulam Nabi Khayal
