= Soch Kral =

Kashmiri Sufi Poet

Sufi; Arif bi'Allah; Kral; Faqeer Soch Kral R.A.
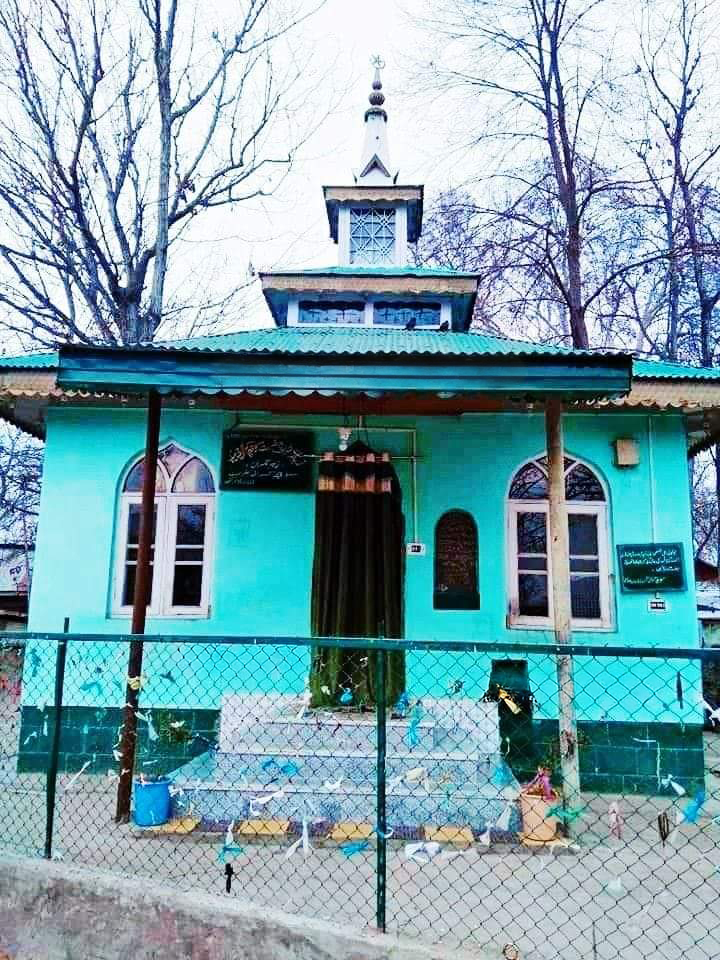
- Shrine of Soch Kral
- Title: Arif bi'Allah (Knower of God)

Personal life
- Born: Ismail; 1782 Yendragam, Pulwama, Jammu and Kashmir.
- Died: 29 November 1854 (aged 71–72)
- Resting place: Pulwama
- Era: Early 19th Century
- Region: Kashmir Valley
- Main interest(s): Sufism, Tasawuf
- Other name: Soch Seab

Religious life
- Religion: Islam
- Denomination: Ishq, (Sufi)

Soch Kral (born Ismail, 1782 – 29 November 1854), was a Kashmiri Sufi poet, and is a Sufi saint. He was born in 1782 in the village of Inder, in present-day Pulwama district, Jammu and Kashmir. He was a potter by profession. He lived a simple life devoted to spirituality, monotheism and mysticism. He was the son of the Sufi poet Arif Kral.

Soch Kral may have migrated to the village of Devsar in the Anantnag district, where his descendants are still living. He married but divorced his wife, and died on 29 November 1854 in Inder. He was a contemporary of Kashmiri Sufi poets such as Mahmud Gami, Wahab Khar, Rahim Saeb Sopori, Karam Buland, and Shah Qalandar. Soch Kral was a disciple of Sufi saint Moomin Sahib of Babgam, Pulwama.

== Published works ==
In 2021, Songs of Soch Kral by Mushtaque B. Barq was published by Kitab Mahal Publishers. The book contains English renderings and interpretations of 23 of Soch Kral's poems, with analysis of their mystical and humanistic themes.

In 2025, Mehfooza Jan, Head of the Department of Kashmiri at the University of Kashmir compiled Soch Kral's poetry into a 234-page book titled Kuliyati Soch Kral, published by Meezan Publishers, Srinagar. The book contains 45 songs, many of which were previously unknown to the public, and includes detailed commentary on his life, poetic style, and spiritual philosophy.

== Legacy ==
According to a blogger on Blogspot.com, Soch Kral used poetry as a tool to enlighten the minds of people, and his work promoted Sufism in Kashmiri poetry.

The Soch Kral Memorial College of Education in Pulwama was named after him.

In about 2009 the state government set aside Rs 50 lakh for the development of a heritage site near the Soch Kral's shrine. By 2012 construction had not started.

In 2016, at Pulwama Degree College, singer Dhananjay Kaul grouped Lal-Ded, Mahjoor, Wahab Khar, and Soch Kral as among the "Sufi greats that Pulwama has produced", and sung their poetry which he set to music.
