= Madhosh Balhami =

Kashmiri poet

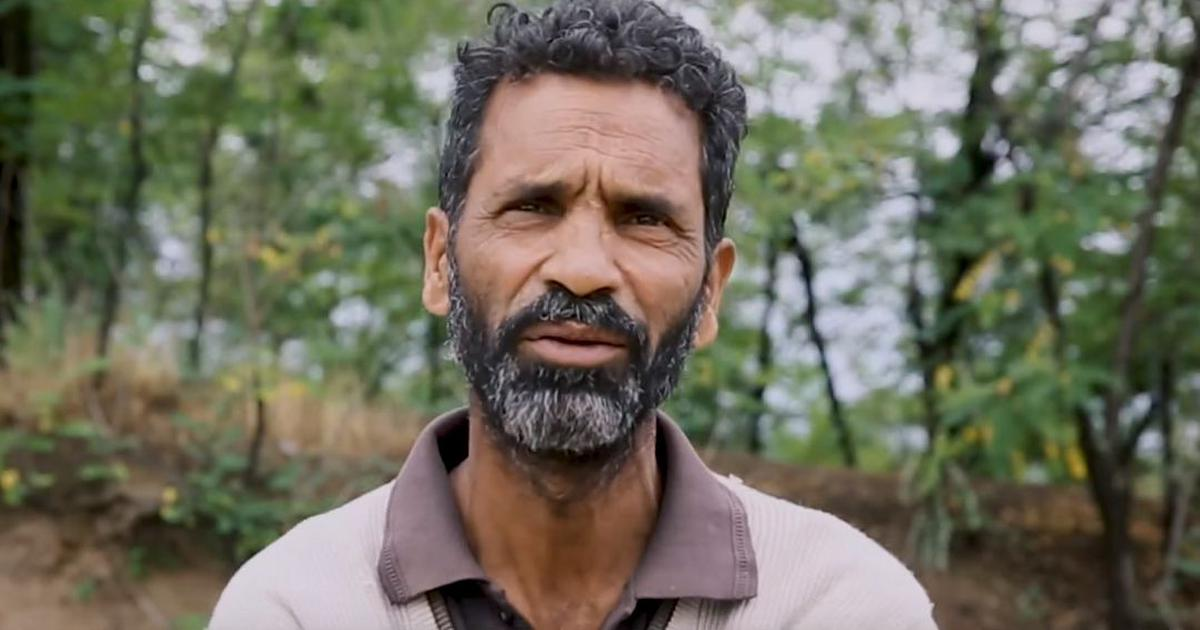
- Born: Ghulam Mohammad Bhat; 1966 (age 59–60); Srinagar, Kashmir
- Occupation: Poet
- Children: 3
- Writing career
- Pen name: Madhosh Balhami
- Notable works: Sadaye Abu Zar, Dard-e-Furqat

Ghulam Mohammad Bhat (born 1966), known by his pen name Madhosh Balhami, is a Kashmiri poet. He started writing poetry following the deaths of his parents, and soon turned to natural, spiritual, and political themes.He is often called "The Poet of Resistance".He is particularly known for his recitation of elegies composed for the funerals of militants in Kashmir. On 15 March 2018, Madhosh Balhami lost his house and thirty years of written poetry to a fire in the middle of a gun battle between Indian soldiers and Rebels.

In 2020, a seven-episode documentary series about his life and poetry, Madhosh Balhami: The Poet of Perseverance, was released on YouTube by Delhi-based filmmakers Mohammad Irfan Dar and Mohammad Gowhar Farooq.

== Early life ==
Balhami grew up in Srinagar and lives close by in a village named Balhama. His father, an illiterate saffron farmer, died in 1981 when he was in college, and his mother followed him a few years later. He read the poetry of 19th and 20th century Urdu poets Mirza Ghalib, Muhammad Iqbal, Faiz Ahmad Faiz, and Shamas Faqir in school. Balhami took to poetry with the grief of his parents' passing. In addition to poetry, he wrote for newspapers and played the harmonium, rubab, and sarangi at bhajans at the village's Bala Devi temple.

== Personal life ==
Madhosh Balhami married in 1983 and is the father of three: two sons and a daughter. His primary income comes from cultivating saffron, but he has also worked as a press secretary for Agha Syed Hassan, a political leader in the Hurriyat Conference. He is a Shia Muslim.

== Poetry ==
=== Poetic practice ===
He grew from writing poetry inspired by love and grief to poems of "spring and summer, spirituality, religion, women’s role in Kashmir’s past, Kashmir and resistance, and the realisation of the importance of human lives and humanity".

He became known in his area as a poet after reciting a long ode praising Zulfikar Ali Bhutto's leadership skills at the protests following his killing by Zia-ul-Haq in 1979. As clashes between militants and the Indian government intensified in the 1990s, he would be called to recite elegies for slain militants. His first elegy was for Hizb-ul-Mujahideen commander Akhtar Abdul Rehman's chaharum (the fourth day after death). He recited his poem at Rehman's house in the presence of mourners. He eventually wrote elegies for militants in Shopian, Pulawama, Pantha Chowk, Khanmoh, Pampore and elsewhere. In response to the growing number of militant deaths, sometimes reaching thirty deaths a day, he wrote a poem dedicated to militants as a group. Written from the perspective of a victim's mother, it became "a sort of martyr's anthem", and was sung by at militant funerals. That poem made Balhami a household name, especially in south Kashmir.

After his imprisonment and torture by the Indian army in 1991, he ceased visiting militant funerals and houses to read elegies and focused on writing poetry on religion, tolerance, and spirituality, though he'd still obliquely reference those involved in the conflict. Part of this turn was fear of reprisal by a government-backed renegade, Ghulam Mohammad Lone (or Papa Kistwari), who lived nearby.

In his 30-year poetic practice, he has refused state patronage, choosing not to be co-opted. He published two books of poetry Sadaye Abu Zar and Dard-e-Furqat in the 2000s.

=== Loss of his poetry ===
On 15 March 2018, his house built by his father in 1967 burned down in a clash between three militants and the government. Before the clash, he said, the militants said they knew they would perish and that his house would be damaged, and that they sought forgiveness. They asked him to leave his house with his family as government troops surrounded them. The militants, belonging to Ansaar Ghazwat-ul-Hind, had been fleeing after an unsuccessful attempt on BJP leader Muhammad Anwar Khan's life.

In the blaze, he lost around 800 pages of his poetry written over 30 years. Among the losses are volumes he had titled Najam-e-Naat, Mankabaat-e-Awliya. He said the rest could have easily formed some six volumes. One in five of his poems could be recovered from his friends. He noted that "losing my jannat (paradise), my world which was my poetry and library, has left a huge scar on my psyche." At the site of his burned-down house, he recited:

Mye wann’te’ kyah khata korum, haq panun mangum agar
Wechaa’n Wechaa’n khand’er banouthan, yi swarg hyu shehar

Translation:

Tell me what crime I commit if I demanded my rights
In a flash of moment this paradise-like city was reduced to rubble

He has since built a one-storey house with financial help from relatives and neighbors in his village.

== Imprisonment ==
He ran for election to the assembly on behalf of the Muslim United Front "to bring about tabdili (change)" in 1987 but lost. His run for election and his elegiac practice began a series of arrests by the Indian government.

In 1991, the day after his elegy at the funeral of Haider Ali, a Hizb-ul-Mimineen militant from Balhami's own village, he was taken by the Indian army to a camp in Khrew. Accused as being a militant sympathizer, the army demanded the location of militants and their weapons. At his refusal to oblige, he was kept in solitary confinement and tortured. He was transferred to Badamibagh cantonment in Srinagar district, a period he calls "the worst time of my life". From there, he was taken to the Joint Interrogation Centre (JIC) in Humhama, Srinagar district. Finally given pen and paper, he started writing and reciting poems to his fellow inmates, most of them captured militants. They had mixed reactions to his work, liking his pro-freedom message but not his questioning of their violent methods. At one point two boys told him he was put on a hit-list for "discouraging our rank-and-file." However, when Balhami sought out two senior Jammu and Kashmir Libration Front members, they reassured him no harm would come to a poet speaking his mind. He resumed his writing and recitation to fellow inmates after that, though he still heard resistance from them about his choice of subjects, such as wanting the return of the Kashmiri Pundits. He spent 11 months in the JIC in Humhama and was allowed to take his writings with him when he was released. Recalling his experience, he says "the sixteen months in jail helped me mature as a poet. I was now critical of everyone including militants. ... I was less emotional as a poet now."

In the middle of 1998, he was arrested again, accused of being part of the militant insurgency, and taken to Cargo in Srinagar. He was beaten at least twice a day for the next 25 days. Then, he was taken to Kathua for nine months and then to Srinagar and Kot Bhalwal in Jammu. After Cargo, he was allowed to write and found an audience for his readings, especially during his imprisonment in Jammu's jails. Balhami spent a total of four years in confinement this time. In this period, he was offered a job as a press secretary by the politician Agha Syed Hasan, who led the party Anjuman-e-Shari Shiyan, part of the Hurriyat Conference. Balhami held this job from April 2001 to March 2018. He was approached to compile a book of his work, but he refused, choosing to wait until "a solution emerges" to the ongoing conflict.
