= Shad Ramzan =

Kashmiri writer, scholar

Professor Shad Ramzaan
- Born: Mohammad Ramzan Shah; 12 April 1956 (age 70); Jammu and Kashmir, India
- Occupations: Writer, scholar
- Writing career
- Language: Kashmiri
- Notable awards: Sahitya Akademi Award

Shad Ramzaan (born Mohammad Ramzan Shah; 12 April 1956) is a Kashmiri writer and scholar. He wrote his first poem at the apparent age of 15. During his career, he wrote numerous poems such as Kore Kakud Pushrith Gome for which he was awarded Sahitya Akademi Award in Kashmiri in 2014.

== Biography ==
He was born on 12 April 1956 to Khair ud Din Mohammad Shah who was a Persian scholar in Kulgam, Jammu and Kashmir.

He wrote on various topics such as Kashmiri language and literature. Some of his books were published by Sahitya Akademi, National Book Trust, and by the Jammu and Kashmir Academy of Art, Culture and Languages. Primarily writes criticism, his research article titled Zulmatus Laal Kya Chhi Tai was published in 2005 and is considered one of the prominent contribution to Kashmiri prose and poetry. His research article titled Sahal Chha Mani Bozun consists of a detailed account of Kashmir language, literature and folklore.

== Controversy ==
University of Kashmi.

== Awards ==
- 2014: Sahitya Akademi Award
- 2009: Sahitya Akademi Translation Prize – for Anhaar Te Aks
