= Bashir Bhadarwahi =

Kashmiri writer, educationist, poet

- Born: Bashir Ahmad Khateeb; 24 January 1935 (age 91); Bhaderwah, Jammu and Kashmir, India
- Education: Master of Arts in Urdu
- Occupations: Writer, educationist, poet
- Writing career
- Language: Kashmiri
- Years active: 1948–present
- Notable works: Jamis Ta Kasheeri Manz Kashir Natia Abduk Tawareekh; Tohfa-e-Azmeen-e-Hijaz; Bhaderwah ki Tareekh-o-Saqafat; Goshan Hind Posh
- Notable awards: Sahitya Akademi Award

Bashir Bhadarwahi (born 24 January 1935; also spelled Bashir Bhaderwahi or Bhadravahi) is an Indian writer, educationist and poet, known for his literary criticisms such as Jamis Ta Kasheeri Manz Kashir Natia Abduk Tawareekh (History of naats in Jammu and Kashmir). The recipient of numerous awards, including Sahitya Akademi Award, he writes in Kashmiri language.

== Early life and education ==
He was born in Bhadarwah, Jammu and Kashmir to a middle-class family. His father served as a school teacher. He did his matriculation from S. A. High School Bhadarwah in 1950. He did his intermediate examination in 1955 after completing a diploma in teaching training. In 1953, he was appointed as a primary school teacher and later was promoted to various academic ranks until he retired as a District Education Officer in 1993 after obtaining a master's degree in Urdu in 1962.

== Career ==
He wrote his first poem on communal violence when he was a student of 8th standard in the early 1948. Later in 1953, he wrote his first ghazal in Kashmiri language when he was serving as a teacher. He also wrote a book on folk music of Doda district which was published by the Jammu and Kashmir Academy of Art, Culture and Languages in 1972. In 1953, he wrote his poetic collection titled Goshan Hind Posh which was published in 1998. After his retirement from the public service, the second edition of the book was published in 2014.

His books such as Bhaderwah ki Tareekh-o-Saqafat are often used by the scholars as a reference work for the Bhadarwah's culture and history. It was published in 2010. His naat collection in Kashmiri language titled Tohfa-e-Azmeen-e-Hijaz was published in 2005.

== Awards ==
In 2015, he was awarded Sahitya Akademi Award winners in Kashmiri for Jamis Ta Kasheeri Manz Kashir Natia Abduk Tawareekh (history of naats in Jammu and Kashmir), a literary criticism about history of naʽats and its tradition in Jammu and Kashmir. He was also awarded Sharaf-e-Kamraz Award in 2014 by Adbee Markaz Kamraz in recognition of his contribution to the literature of Kashmir. He was also awarded by Jammu and Kashmir Academy of Art, Culture and Languages (JKAACL) for his contribution to Kashmiri language and literature. Later in 2007, he was awarded by Jammu and Kashmir Chief Minister Award by the government of Jammu and Kashmir for promoting of education of the state.
