= Rafiq Raaz =

Kashmiri poet, broadcaster

- Born: March 10, 1950 (age 76); Srinagar, Jammu and Kashmir princely state, India
- Education: M.A
- Alma mater: University of Kashmir S. P. College
- Occupations: Poet, Broadcaster
- Parent: Khaja Ali Mohd Shamrock (father)
- Writing career
- Language: Kashmiri, Urdu
- Genres: Ghazal, Qasida
- Notable work: All India Radio Srinagar (director)
- Notable awards: Full list

Rafiq Raaz (born 10 March 1950) is an Indian poet, broadcaster and the former director of All India Radio Srinagar. He primarily writes in Urdu and Kashmiri language. He published his first book titled Nai Che Naalan (Flute is wailing) in 1978, leading him to become the recipient of Sahitya Akademi Award after the book was released to the general public in 1995. Consisting of eighty-three ghazals and one qasida about Nund Rishi, it was later introduced to the Bachelor of Arts courses by the University of Kashmir.

He was among the other writers who helped improve Kashmiri literature in 1950s of what is now called modern Kashmiri literature. In 2015, he featured in Meet the Author Program focused on to promote Urdu and Persian languages in the region. It is organised by the University of Kashmir via its English department.

== Early life and education ==
He was born on 10 March 1950 in Srinagar, Jammu and Kashmir princely state, India (in modern-day Jammu and Kashmir union territory). He was ten years old when his father Khaja Ali Mohd Shamrock permanently relocated to Zaina Kadal and stayed there for over thirty-eight years until he relocated to Bagat Srinagar.

He attended schools in his hometown, and later he attended S. P. College for further studies. He obtained master's degree in Urdu language from the University of Kashmir. In 1975 and 1976, he started his PhD thesis at the same university.

He was later appointed to the post of lecturer at the department of Kashmiri where he taught until he was appointed as a programme executive at the All India Radio Srinagar, and by the latter served as director until he retired in 2010.

== Career ==
During his career, he wrote six books out of two such as Anhar and Nai Che Naalan consisting of one hundred and eight-three ghazals and one qasida. He also wrote 50 to 60 radio plays broadcast by the Radio Kashmir, and has also used to host morning radio programs, including Zoon-e-Dab program, while some programs were aimed at to recite Āyahs (Quranic verses). He also wrote a patriotic song titled Ek Hai Bharat Shresth Bharat (There is no country like India) that was released on Republic Day by the All India Radio.

=== Publications ===
#	Title	Year	Type/Credited as	Note
1	Nuqte Mein Simatti Roshni	1946	Poetry	—N/a
2	Nai Chi Naalan (Flute is wailing)	1978	Book	Consisting eighty-three ghazals and one qasida. The book won two literary honors
3	Anhar	2004	Book	Consisting one hundred ghazals
4	Mishraq	2009	Poetry	—N/a
5	Nakhl-e-Aab	2015	Poetry	—N/a
6	Dustavaiz	—N/a	Poetry	
7	Arooz Kashir Zaban (Prosody of Kashmiri language)	—N/a	Research book	It covers the history of Kashmiri language and ghazals

== Awards and accordion ==
Year	Nominated work	Award	Category	Result	Ref.
1997	Nai Chi Naalan (Flute is wailing)	Sahitya Academy Award	Kashmiri	Won	
—N/a	Nai Chi Naalan (Flute is wailing)	State Award (Note: the award was presented by the government of Jammu and Kashmir, but the award name is not known)	Kashmiri	Won	
2015	In recognition of his contribution to the Kashmiri literature	Sharf-e-Kamraz	Literature	Won	
