= Akhtar Mohiuddin (writer) =

Kashmiri writer from India

- Born: Ghulam Mohiuddin Wani; 17 April 1928; Srinagar, Jammu and Kashmir
- Died: 2001 (aged 72–73)
- Occupations: Kashmiri novelist, playwright and short story writer
- Known for: development of modern Kashmiri literature
- Notable work: Sath Sangar and Sonzal short stories; Doad Dag novel
- Awards: Sahitya Akademi Award (1958) Padma Shri (1968; returned 1984)

Akhtar Mohiuddin (born Ghulam Mohiuddin Wani; 17 April 1928 – 2001), was a Kashmiri novelist, playwright and short story writer, who made significant contribution to the development of modern Kashmiri literature.

== Early life ==
Born in Srinagar, Jammu and Kashmir, his novel, Doad Dag is considered as the first novel written and published in Kashmiri. He received Sahitya Akademi Award in 1958 for his short story collection Sath Sangar.

His early writings were in Urdu. Sath Sangar and Sonzal are his collection of short stories. He also wrote some plays. The depiction of human nature and handling of human nature are the main features of his writings. The Government of India conferred him the Padma Shri in 1968. He returned the Padma Shri in protest against the hanging of Maqbool Bhat, whom he considered the "National Hero of Kashmir".

== See also ==
- List of Sahitya Akademi Award winners for Kashmiri
