= Mohiuddin Hajni =

Kashmiri writer and critic (1917-1993)

Prof. Mohiuddin Hajni
- Ghulam Mohiuddin Hajni
- Born: Ghulam Mohiuddin Hajni; August 21, 1917; Hajin, J&K, British India
- Died: January 21, 1993 (aged 75); Bandipora, J&K, India
- Resting place: Hajin, Bandipora
- Education: S.P College; Aligarh Muslim University
- Occupations: Writer; Poet; Critic; Political activist
- Writing career
- Pen name: Mohiuddin Hajni
- Language: Kashmiri
- Subjects: Language, Art, Literature, Culture, Politics
- Notable awards: Sahitya Akademi Award

Ghulam Mohiuddin Hajni (21 June 1917 – 21 January 1993) was a Kashmiri writer, critic, political activist and teacher. He wrote in regional and foreign languages such as Urdu, Persian, Arabic and primarily in Kashmiri language. In 1970, he became the recipient of Sahitya Akademi Award for his research publication titled Maqalati Hajini.

He translated One Thousand and One Nights (often known as Alif Laila), into Kashmiri language, and sometimes used to wrote radio dramas and poetry. During his career, he criticised the political doctrine of Sheikh Abdullah, 3rd chief ministers and 2nd prime minister of Jammu and Kashmir.

== Education and background ==
He was born on 21 June 1917 at Hajin village of Bandipora district in the princely state of Jammu and Kashmir, within British India. He attended Sopore School and then obtained Bachelor’s degree from Sri Pratap College in Srinagar. He later went to Uttar Pradesh where he obtained master’s degree in Arabic from Aligarh Muslim University. After completing master's, he obtained Bachelor of Laws degree and diploma in Journalism. He also taught at S.P College until he retired from the service.

== Literary work ==
Besides his appearance in Kashmiri and other non-native literatures, he was involved in resistance literature, writing in protest of Dogra rule. He wrote Grees Sund Ghar (Peasant's House), the first resistance radio play written in Kashmiri language, which was published in 1917. Later, it appeared in 1939 in a journal and fifteen years later in a book. The play is also known for its Shakespeare's writing style ever written in Kashmiri literature.

In 1954, he wrote Koshur Reader for the Directorate of School Education. In later years following his 1954 publications, he wrote a monograph titled Wahab Parray, in 1959 which was published by Jammu and Kashmir Art and Cultural Academy. In 1960, he wrote a book titled Kashir Shairi, comprising a collection of Kashmiri poetry published by the Sahitya Akademi. Later in 1961, his another book titled Kashiri Nasrach Kitab was the bestselling book of that time. In 1962, he wrote Gaman Manz Pheeri Pheeri (travelling through the villages) which depicted him as journalist travelling across the Kashmiri villages. In 1967, he wrote a research book titled Maqalat, comprising a collection of essays that revolves around different aspects of Kashmiri literature and language.

=== Work ===
Key
| † | Remarks denote a short description of the work where available. |

| # | Title | Year | Type/Credited as | Remarks |
|---|---|---|---|---|
| 1 | Grees Sund Ghar | 1952 | Radio play | The first play written in Kashmiri literature. The play describes writer's feelings against Dogra dynasty. |
| 2 | Koshur Reader | 1954 | Research | —N/a |
| 3 | Wahab Parray, in 1959 | 1959 | Research | —N/a |
| 4 | Kashir Shairi | 1960 | Poetry | Comprising a collection of Kashmiri poetry |
| 5 | Kashiri Nasrach Kitab | 1961 | Book | Bestselling book during 1960s in Kashmir |
| 6 | Gaman Manz Pheeri Pheeri | 1962 | Book | —N/a |
| 7 | Maqalat | 1967 | Book | Comprising a collection of essays about Kashmiri language and literature. The book won 1970 Sahitya Akademi Award |
| 8 | One Thousand and One Nights | 1969 | Translator | Often known as Alif Laila |
| 9 | Kalam e Assad Parray | —N/a | Book | —N/a |
| 10 | The Quran and the fundamentals of science: A concordance | —N/a | Research book | —N/a |
| 11 | Medieval legacy to Modern Inorganic Chemistry | —N/a | Research book | —N/a |
| 12 | Historical Background of Kashmiri Language | —N/a | Research book | —N/a |

== Political activities ==
During the 1930s, the princely state, in modern-day Jammu and Kashmir union territory witnessed protests against Dogra dynasty. He participated in protests during his school days. He was later arrested and is claimed was "lashed 24 times on his buttocks”. His activities were also reported to Bakshi Ghulam Mohammad, 2nd prime minister of Jammu and Kashmir. The authorities detained him between 1948 and 1965 for his involvement in political activities.

== Death ==
He died on 21 January 1993. He is buried in a cemetery located in his village Hajin, Bandipora. In 2019, the government of Jammu and Kashmir proposed the establishment of two degree colleges in Hajin and Ajas areas and named the two after him.
