= Sajood Sailani =

Kashmiri playwright and cartoonist (1936–2020)

- Born: Ghulam Mohammed Wani; 1936; Jammu and Kashmir, British India
- Died: 17 November 2020 (aged 83–84); Jammu and Kashmir, India
- Resting place: Pandrethan, Nowgam, Srinagar
- Education: Matriculation
- Occupations: Playwright; Painter; Theater artist; Cartoonist; Poet
- Children: Showkat Shehri; Manzoor Ahmad
- Writing career
- Pen name: Sajood Sailani
- Language: Urdu, Kashmiri
- Years active: 70s–2020
- Subjects: Noha, Social reforms
- Notable awards: Full list

Sajood Sailani (born Ghulam Mohammed Wani; 1936 – 17 November 2020) was a Kashmiri playwright, painter, theater artist, cartoonist and a poet. He is primarily recognized for his radio plays written in regional languages. He produced his work in Urdu and Kashmiri languages and wrote about 150 radio plays, 27 stage dramas and 40 comedies throughout his career. In the latter years of his career, he wrote a play titled Kaej Raath, leading him to become the recipient of Sahitya Akademi Award under Kashmiri category in 1994. He also served as a member of Sahitya Akademi's advisory board from 1973 to 1977 and in 1990.

He was born as Ghulam Mohammed Wani around 1936 in Dalgate Srinagar, Jammu and Kashmir. He is survived by three children, including two sons Showkat Shehri (playwright and writer) and Manzoor Ahmad (psychiatrist) and a daughter.

== Biography ==
He played a prominent role in popularizing modern Kashmiri theatre during 70s and 80s when he established Wani Art Gallery. He started his career after being inspired by the All India Radio's night show Hawa Mahal programme. He later recorded nohakhwaani (tragedy of Husayn ibn Ali) at Radio Kashmir Srinagar (in modern-day AIR Srinagar). He also wrote some uncertain scripts of noha depicting battle of Karbala.

He originally started his career when he was studying in 10th class. It is believed that he never attended any college for further studies. He initially started writing short sketch comedies for the All India Radio and later worked for the Radio Kashmir Srinagar where he produced most of his literary work, including prominent dramas such as Kaej Raath (Dumb Night), Gaashe Taaruk (Guiding Star), and Ropye Rood (Money shower). His prominent dramas include Zalur (spider), Vutri binyul (catastrophe), Fundbaz (swindler) and Tentykor (Catgut) among others.

As a painter, he established Wani Art Gallery and subsequently became the recipient of an uncertain cultural award conferred by the government of Jammu and Kashmir's department Cultural Academy in 1970. He is sometimes considered as the only Kashmiri writer till this century who wrote a radio play in Bhojpuri language.

== Awards ==
Year	Award	Nominated work	Result	Note	Ref.
2008	State Cultural Academy Felicitation	—N/a	Won	—N/a	
2008	Writer in Residency Award	—N/a	Won	—N/a	
1998	Best Play Awards	Paar Sung	Won	—N/a	
1994	Sahitya Akademi Award	Kaej Raath	Won	—N/a	
1990	Best Play Awards	Raat-e-Kareel	Won	—N/a	
1990	Akashwani Best Radio Play Award	Kana Pakiir	Won	—N/a	
1980	Best Play Awards	Shuhul Naar	Won	—N/a	
1976	—N/a	Ropye Roodh	Won	—N/a	
1975	Kashmir Theatre Federation Best Decor Award	—N/a	Won	—N/a	
1970	State Cultural Academy Award	Shehjaar	Won	Awarded by the Jammu and Kashmir Academy of Art, Culture and Languages in recognition of his contribution to Kashmiri poetry	

== Death ==
He was suffering from chronic condition for some years and died on 17 November 2020 in Zafran Colony residence of Srinagar. He is buried in Pandrethan, cemetery of Srinagar.
