= Mashal Sultanpuri =

Kashmiri poet, writer, and critic (1937–2020)

- Born: Mohammed Ramzan Bhat; 1937; Baramulla, Jammu and Kashmir
- Died: October 2020 (aged 82–83); Baramulla, Jammu and Kashmir
- Writing career
- Language: Urdu, Kashmiri
- Genres: Ghazal, Quatrain
- Notable awards: Sahitya Akademi Award

Mohammed Ramzan Bhat (1937 – October 2020), known by his pen name as Mashal Sultanpuri, was a Kashmiri poet, writer and critic. He was primarily engaged in writing Kashmiri prose. Prior to his appointment as a patron of Adbee Markaz Kamraz, the oldest literary organization of Jammu and Kashmir, he served as a president of AMK. In 2009, he became the recipient of Sahitya Akademi Award for his literary criticism book titled Vont. He was among the other campaigners who helped Kashmiri literature to be included in curriculum.

== Biography ==
He was born in 1937 as Mohammed Ramzan Bhat in Sultanpur Baramulla. He initially wrote under different pen names but later chose to go with Mashal Sultanpuri. He wrote nineteen poetic books in Urdu and Kashmiri languages. During his school days, he was engaged in copying the poems of famous poets and later published his own poetry collection titled Keh Ghazale at the apparent age of sixteen. The second poetic collection he published in 1966 was Dubrai. In 1974, he published another poetry titled Heevan.

He also translated some uncertain publications of Muhammad Iqbal, Sheikh Sarmad and Shakespeare's Sonnets. Later, he translated August Na, a play by Manoranjan Das originally published in Odia language.
