= Autar Krishen Rahbar =

Kashmiri dramatist, writer (1934-2020)

Autar Krishen Rehbar
- Born: 16 August 1934; Jammu and Kashmir, India
- Died: 30 July 2020 (aged 85); New Delhi, India
- Education: PG
- Occupations: Dramatist, short story writer, literary historian
- Writing career
- Language: Kashmiri
- Notable work: Yeli Parda Woth
- Notable awards: Sahitya Akademi Award

Autar Krishen Rehbar ( 16 August 1934 – 30 July 2020) was an Indian dramatist, short story writer, literary historian and the former deputy director of Radio Kashmir, Srinagar. He wrote several books of short stories such as Talash (Search), and Bi Chus Tsur (I am a Thief).

He originally started his literary career as a teacher at Burn Hall School, and later started working on radio plays.

== Biography ==
He was born in 1933 in Srinagar, Jammu and Kashmir. After obtaining his Post-graduation, he joined Radio Kashmir where he produced dramas. Known for his contribution to Culture of Kashmir and art, his prominent writings included Mukht Lar, which consists history of Kashmiri literature. He also produced a drama titled Badshah which was broadcast several times by the Radio Kashmir.

He produced some prominent programmes such as Raai Traai and Rang Haa His plays such as Reh Te Aab, and Awlaad are considered one of the historical plays in Kashmiri language. He also wrote history of Kashmiri literature titled Kashre Adabich Tereekh (A history of Kashmiri literature).

In 2017, he became the recipient of Sahitya Akademi Award winners in Kashmiri for his short story titled Yeli Parda Woth.

He died on 30 July 2020 in New Delhi after chronic condition.
