= Gani Kashmiri =

17th century Persian-language poet

- Born: Muhammad Tahir Gani Ashai; 1630
- Died: c. 1669 (aged 38–39); Srinagar, Kashmir Subah, Mughal Empire
- Resting place: Rajouri Kadal, Srinagar Jammu and Kashmir
- Occupation: Poet
- Writing career
- Language: Kashmiri, Persian (Note: He also contributed to the development of Urdu and Kashmiri literature, but his most produced work was in Persian language.)
- Period: Mughal Empire
- Genres: Gazal; Rubaʿi; Rekhta

Gani Kashmiri (Note: Also spelled Ghani Kashmiri.) (/ˈɡɑːni kæʃˈmɪəri/ GAH-nee kash-MEER-ee; born Muhammad Tahir Gani Ashai; (Note: Also spelled Mulla Mohammad Tahir Ashai.) c. 1630 – c. 1669), was a Persian-language poet from Kashmir. His uncertain authorship, including gazals and 100,000 verses, consist of some single tazmins, ninety-two rubaʿis, two maṯnavis, and one twenty-eight couplets (Note: "tazmin" and "maṯnavi" are possibly poetic genres or form in Persian, but their status is currently unknown) and some verses in rekhta and Kashmiri. His writings have been reinterpreted by Muhammad Iqbal, Mir Taqi Mir, Saadat Hasan Manto, and by a rebellion Mughal poet, Ghalib, who is believed to have translated around forty of his couplets into Urdu language.

In Kashmiri literature besides Persian and Urdu, he is often recognized one of the greatest poets of the Jammu and Kashmir, particularly in Kashmir Valley, a place he lived his life.

He was born around 1630 as Muhammad Tahir Gani Ashai in Ashai family and lived in Rajouri Kadal, Srinagar. He produced most of his work during the reign of Shah Jahan and Aurangzeb. It is believed he preferably did not complete any nonformal or formal education outside Srinagar, though he received his education from Mohsin Fani, a Persian historian who taught him medicine, literature and philosophy.

== Influences ==
Aurangzeb, the sixth Mughal emperor, who retained the royal position over Indian subcontinent for a period of 49 years, invited him via his governor Saif Khan to his residence to know about his writing style, and asked to recite marsiya for the king.

== Literary work ==
Sometimes, he used to sing besides writing, and during the time, he used to close all doors and leave them open while on the go. His poetry is believed to have strong influences across Afghanistan, Iran, Turan an India. Gani's literary work was covered in a book titled Title The Captured Gazelle: The Poems of Ghani Kashmiri by Mufti Mudasir Farooqi, which was published in 2013. The book includes translation of the Persian poems into English language.

== Death ==
He died around 1669 and is buried near Rajouri Kadal, Srinagar, Jammu and Kashmir.

In 2009, the government of Jammu and Kashmir ordered construction of walls and tomb, however the Srinagar Municipal Corporation was accused for delayed work, leading the construction to complete in a period of one year. The Greater Kashmir argued that involved constructor defaced the tomb in an attempt to complete the signed contract within deadline.

=== Death date ===
Scholars and historians have different opinions about his actual death date. Some scholars said he died at 41, while some argue he lived long.

== Legacy ==
=== Institutions ===
On 30 June 2001, the state-owned agency, Department of Libraries & Research established Gani Memorial Library & Reading Centre, a public library in Srinagar named after Gani. The library was initially set up in a house in 1971 as a reading room for students. However, the project was later shifted to another rented house over dilapidated condition. The new library, which cost ₹41 million, consist a collection of 8000 books and a special Career Corner for the students to prepare for the competitive examinations.

In 2017, the department showcased 700 year old writings of Sanskrit, Persian, and Kashmiri in the library. It also include the handwritten Quran with gold, Bhagavad Gita, and a detailed account of some living creatures in papier-mâché. Some historical books written around 1870 on textile in Kashmiri language, including Luqman's 100 advises to his son were also made available in the library.

=== Places ===
In 2015, the government along with associated state-owned agencies upgraded the Gani Memorial Stadium, a place or venue built and named after Gani Kashmiri in Rajouri Kadal, Srinagar. Later in 2019, the government spent ₹12 million for installing 120 floodlights across the stadium, making it to become the first place in Rajouri Kadal equipped with broad-beamed lights. A hostel for research scholars near Sir Syed Gate at University of Kashmir, Hazratbal is named after Gani Kashmiri as Gani Kashmiri Research Scholars Inn.

== Books ==
- Farooqi, Mufti Mudasir (2013). The Captured Gazelle: The Poems of Ghani Kashmiri. Penguin UK. p. 280. ISBN 978-81-8475-995-2.

== Bibliography ==
- Nahvi Quadri, Dr. Neelofar Naaz. Gani Kashmiri.
- Nahvi Quadri, Dr. Neelofar Naaz. Gani Kashmiri: Hayat Aur Shairi. p. 186.
