= Kurigam =

- Country: India
- Union Territory: Jammu and Kashmir
- District: Anantnag

Languages
  - Official: Kashmiri, Urdu, Hindi, Dogri, English
- Time zone: UTC+5:30 (IST)

Kurigam is a village in the Indian state of Jammu and Kashmir. It is the ward number 1 of main town of Qazigund. It is famous for Sufi saints namely, Hazrat Baba Habib Shah Sahab and Hazrat Baba Mueen shah Sahab. Kurigam is also famous for the kashmiri poet Prakash Ram bhatt River Yethyathur. A shrine is present on the grave of Hazrat Baba Habib Shah Sahab and Hazrat Baba Sa'd Shah Sahab whose shrine is in shampora. The grave of Hazrat Baba Mueen Shah Sahab is without a shrine. Whenever a shrine is built, the next day it collapsed due to some spiritual restrictions as per local narrations but on 23 March 2021 Maulana Hafiz Syed Zahid Hussain marked wooden structure around his blessed grave. Hazrat Baba Habib Shah sahab's is a renowned saint of this area whose Urs is celebrated every year as per Kashmiri calendar which comes in March every year.

Kurigam is the birthplace of Sufi Poet Prakash Ram Bhatt.

== Transport ==
Kurigam is linked to Qazigund town by two roads. Railway station Qazigund was situated in Kurigam. A railway line joins Kurigam to other towns.
