= Maqbool Shah Kralawari =

19th century Kashmiri poet

Peer Maqbool Shah Kralawari (1820–1877) پیر مقبول شاہ کرالہ واری was a poet of the 19th-century Kashmiri literature. Educated in Persian literature and considered among the finest poets of 19th-century Kashmir. His literary genius came to focus through "Gulrez" گلریز (Scattered Flowers), a poem, many claim as finest descriptive poetry of the 19th-century Kashmiri literature.

Abdul Ahad Azad, praises Maqbool Shah and his contribution to Kashmiri poetry :

مقبول اپنے اشعار میں جب تصوف لکھتے ہیں تو بلند پایہ صوفی معلوم ہوتے ہیں۔ جب امیدوآرزو کا پیغام سناتے ہیں تو علامہ اقبال کا جوش بیان یاد آتا ہے۔ مذہبیات کہتے ہیں تو معلوم ہوتا ہے کہ ایک جوشیلا ملا اور بارعب واعظ مسجد کے منبر پر جھوم رہا ہے۔

Mohammad Yousuf Taing collected most part of Maqbool's poetic assets and compiled a book Maqbool Shah Kralwari (2 volumes) 1972, 1978 (Edited)
