= Dinanath Nadim =

Kashmiri poet (1916–1988)

Dinanath Kaul "Nadim" (1916–1988) was a prominent Kashmiri poet of the 20th century. He was born on 18 March 1916 in Srinagar city and with him began an era of modern Kashmiri poetry. He also virtually led the progressive writers movement in Kashmir.

== Literary works ==
Rooted to the soil of Kashmir, Nadim spoke Kashmiri, though he initially wrote in Hindi and Urdu as well. He influenced a large group of poets of his age as well as younger than him.

Nadim also wrote operas like Vitasta (Jhelum River), Safar Taa Shehjaar (The journey and the Shade), Heemaal Taa Naaegrai (Heemaal and Naagraaj), Shuhul Kull (The Shady Tree) and Bombur Taa yamberzal (Bumblebee and the Narcissus Flower). His most popular operatic work was Bombur Taa yamberzal, which was the first opera to be published in Kashmiri. Me Chhum Aash Paghich (I am hopeful of tomorrow) is the most powerful Anti war poem in Kashmiri which Nadim wrote. He received the Soviet Land Nehru Award in 1971 and the Sahitya Natak Academi Award for "Shuhul Kull" in 1986. He died on 7 April 1988.

== See also ==
- List of Sahitya Akademi Award winners for Kashmiri
