= Omkar Nath Koul =

Indian linguist (1934–2018)

- Born: 7 January 1934; Budgam, Jammu and Kashmir, British Empire
- Died: 4 May 2018 (aged 84); New Delhi, India

Academic background
- Education: Kanhaiyalal Maniklal Munshi Institute of Hindi and Linguistics, Agra (PhD); University of Illinois (M.A.)

Academic work
- Discipline: Linguistics
- Sub-discipline: Indian linguistics, Kashmiri language, language teaching, communication, comparative literature

Omkar Nath Koul (7 January 1934 – 4 May 2018) was a Kashmiri linguist. As a researcher, his interests included the areas of linguistics, language education, communications management, and comparative literature. Since the 1970s he has held several academic and administrative positions. In particular, he had been a professor at the LBS National Academy of Administration, Mussoorie, India, and a professor at the Central Institute of Indian Languages, Mysore, India. Koul also served as the director of the Central Institute of Indian Languages from 1999 to 2000. Koul died on 4th May 2018 due to a prolonged illness

== Selected bibliography ==
=== Relating to Kashmir ===
- Koul, Omkar N. (1977). Linguistic Studies in Kashmiri. New Delhi, India: Bahri Publications Pvt. Ltd. ASIN B0000D5O65.
- Koul, Omkar N.; Hook, Peter Edwin, eds. (1984). Aspects of Kashmiri Linguistics. New Delhi, India: Bahri Publications Pvt. Ltd. ASIN B0013ETAYE.
- Koul, Omkar N. (1985). An Intensive Course in Kashmiri. Mysore, India: Central Institute of Indian Languages. ASIN B0006ERSZK.
- Koul, Omkar N. (1992). A Dictionary of Kashmiri Proverbs. New Delhi, India: Indian Institute of Language Studies. ISBN 978-81-85231-20-4.
- Koul, Omkar N. (1995). An Intermediate Course in Kashmiri.
- Koul, Omkar N. (26 December 1996). Kashmiri: A Cognitive-Descriptive Grammar. Routledge. ISBN 978-0-415-05868-1.
- Koul, Omkar N. (2000). Kashmiri Language, Linguistics and Culture: An Annotated Bibliography.
- Koul, Omkar N. (2002). Topics in Kashmiri Linguistics. Creative Books. ISBN 978-81-86318-99-7.
- Koul, Omkar N. (2005). Studies in Kashmiri Linguistics. New Delhi, India: Indian Institute of Language Studies. ISBN 978-81-86323-20-5.
- Koul, Omkar N (January 2006). Modern Kashmiri Grammar. Hyttsville, USA: Dunwoody Press. ISBN 978-1-931546-07-2.
- Koul, Omkar N. (15 December 2006). Spoken Kashmiri: A Language course (2nd ed.). Educa Books. ISBN 978-81-86323-19-9.
- Koul, Omkar N. (2008). Kashmiri Newspaper Reader. Hyattsville, USA: Dunwoody Press. 978-8186323267.

=== Other works ===
- Hassan, Nazir; Koul, Omkar N. (1980). Urdu Phonetic Reader. Mysore, India: Central Institute of Indian Languages.
- Koul, Omkar N. (1983). Language in Education. Harnam Publications.
- Dulai, Narinder K.; Koul, Omkar N. (1980). Punjabi Phonetic Reader. Mysore, India: Central Institute of Indian Languages.
- Koul, Omkar N.; Bala, Madhu (1989). Modes of Address and Pronominal Usage in Punjabi. Mysore, India: Central Institute of Indian Languages.
- Koul, Omkar N. (1982). Topics in Hindi Linguistics. New Delhi, India: Bahri Publications Pvt. Ltd.
- Koul, Omkar N. (1986). Language, Style and Discourse. New Delhi, India: Bahri Publications Pvt. Ltd. ISBN 978-81-7034-064-5.
- Koul, Omkar N., ed. (1994). Language Development and Administration. India: Creative Books.
- Koul, Omkar N. (1994). Effective Communication Skills. India: Creative Books. ISBN 978-81-86318-05-8.
- Koul, Omkar N. (2004). Translation: Issues and Perspectives. India: Creative Books. ISBN 978-81-8043-005-3.
- Koul, Omkar N. (co-author) (2007). Punjabi Newspaper Reader. Hyattsville, USA: Dunwoody Press. ISBN 978-81-86323-27-4.
- Koul, Omkar N. (2008). Modern Hindi Grammar. Hyattsville, USA: Dunwoody Press. ISBN 978-1-931546-06-5.
- Koul, Omkar N (2011). Indo-Aryan Linguistics. Mysore: Central Institute of Indian Languages.
