= Yawan Mats =

Female disciple of Nund Rishi (Kashmir)

- Born: 1400s Kashmir
- Died: Kashmir
- Other name: Shanga Bibi
- Era: Shah Mir era
- Known for: Female disciple of Sheikh Noor-ud-din Wali

Yawan Mats was a female disciple of Sheikh Noor-ud-din Wali of Kashmir. A beautiful dancer, a courtesan, Yawan Mats was famous in the high society of Kashmir at the end of fourteenth and beginning of fifteenth century.

== Her Conversion ==
It is said that there used to be a holy man, a very popular Brahman saint, who used to live in the village of Ishbar, near Nishat. He had a large following of faithful in Kashmir. One day the Sultan of Kashmir (Sikandar, Ali Shah or Budshah - we do not know for sure) showed up at his place. The Brahman refused to see the Sultan. Insulted, the Sultan planned a fitting revenge. A few days later the Sultan sent in the beautiful Yawan Mats. The femme fatale went to see the Brahman as a devotee. Tempted by her looks he was hopelessly smitten. The resulting scandal was used by many Muslims of Kashmir to make fun of their Hindu neighbors about their holy man. It is said that some of the well connected Kashmiri Pandits wanted to use the same tactics on the most prominent Muslim saint of the time, Sheikh Noor-ud-din Wali. They paid Yawan Mats to seduce the Reshi. Yawan Mats tried her charms but it was the charm of the Reshi that won. Yawan Mats gave the life of a society girl and became one of the disciples of the Reshi. The Great Reshi immortalized Yawan Mats in one of his poems "Payekh payas Yawan Matsee" (Yawan Mats you will repent one day).

After her conversion Yawan Mats was given the name Shanga Bibi and she was the only female Mujawirs at Nund Reshi's tomb. She is buried next to Nund Reshi's shrine in Tsaar.
