= Samad Mir =

Mystic sufi poet (1893 – 1959)

Samad Mir (1893 – 9 January 1959) was a Kashmiri Sufi Muslim poet from Kashmir.

== Early life ==
Mir was born in Alam Sahib Narwara, Srinagar, Kashmir. His parents, Khaliq Mir and Noor Khaliq Mir, were dervish followers originally from Nambalhar, a small village in Budgam, Jammu and Kashmir, a northwestern Himalayan state. They moved to Srinagar in search of a livelihood. His father, Khaliq Mir, who was also a Sufi poet, died between 1893 and 1894. Mir had two brothers, Rahim and Mohammad. Rahim remained in Narwara, while Mohammad died in his twenties. Mir was the only one who returned to his native village, nambalhar .

Mir worked as a laborer at the Hari Niwas Palace (commonly known as The Grand Palace) in Srinagar. He had three sons and one daughter.

== Poetry and Sufism ==
Mir was illiterate, having had no formal education. His poetry was transcribed by Ali Shah of Wagar, Budgam.

Mir's poetry was compiled into a collection titled Kulyaat-e-Samad Mir by Moti Lal Saqi. The Jammu and Kashmir Academy of Art, Culture and Languages has published and revised the collection four times. Mir incorporated Sanskrit and Hindi words in his poetry, distinct from other Kashmiri Sufi poets. A monograph on Mir has been published by the Sahitya Akademi, Government of India, in both Urdu and Kashmiri. Mir has written more than 200 poems.

In line with Sufi tradition, Mir's poetry often addresses concepts such as beauty and truth. A common theme is the praise of prophets, wali, and the Sufi saints of Islam.

== Death ==
Mir died on 9 January 1959, at his residence in Nambalhar (also known as Nambalhard). He was buried at Agar, Nambalhar (Budgam district), where a shrine has since been erected in his honor.

== Works ==
- Aknandun ("The Only Son")
- Praran Praran Tarawatiyay
- Islamic Poetry (Na'ats)
