= Chandgam, Pulwama =

Chandgam, Pulwama Babgoom
- Village
- Chandgam Pulwama
- Location in Jammu and Kashmir, India
- Coordinates: 33.8732°N 74.8960°E
- Country: India
- State/Union Territory: Jammu and Kashmir
- District: Pulwama
- Tehsil/Block: Pulwama
- Elevation: 1,588 m (5,210 ft)

Population (2011)
  - Total: 3,031
- Time zone: UTC+5:30 (Indian Standard Time)
- Vehicle registration: JK13

Chandgam (also Known as Babgom) is a village in Pulwama district of Jammu and Kashmir in India. It is located 7 km(5.5 mi ) towards East from District Headquarters Pulwama and 33.3 km(27.5 mi) from State Capital Srinagar.

It is referred as "Babgom" in vernacular due the presence of various saints in the region in the previous century, revered by thousands across the district namely "Zaina bibi", "Moomin saeb" and others. It is flanked by villages Navnagri, Tumlhal, Lassipora, Armulla and Thal-shadipora. Upper karewa (hillock) consists primarily of Apple, Pear, walnut, almond orchards while Tahab-Chakoora-Naina road separates the lower lying fertile lands used primarily for agriculture and settlements. The residential area is divided into many mohallas such as Peer mohalla, Malik mohalla, Hajam mohalla, maqdum mohalla etc. for identification.

The fauna consists of the Himalayan black bear, Wild Foxes and Levantine Viper (gunas) found occasionally in the upper karewas along with domesticated animals. A model school operates in the area.

The major religion in the village is Islam (100%) and primary source of income is agriculture, fruits and small-time business. The village itself is internally demarcated as haer gam and bon gam (upper/lower lying along east -west).

PHC TAHAB is the nearest hospital facility and Govt high school, chandgam is the nearest Educational institution.

In recent years, plans for installing a Fruit Mandi and sicop(small scale industries development cooperation limited)in the region gained traction yet to reach fruition.Tahab-Chakoora-Naina Road is a major interdistrict road junction nearby.
