= Adeeba Riyaz =

Kashmiri Author

- Born: Batengoo, Anantnag
- Citizenship: Indian
- Education: Radiant public school anantnag
- Parent: Riyaz Ahmad Sofi (father)
- Writing career
- Language: English, Kashmiri, Urdu, Hindi.
- Genre: English poetry

Adeeba Riyaz, born in the Anantnag district of Jammu and Kashmir, is an English language poet. She is the youngest author from the Union Territory to publish a book, Zeal of Pen.

== Published work ==
- Zeal Of Pen (2021)
