= Pandit Taba Ram Turki =

Pandit Taba Ram Turki (1776 – 1847 CE, 1833 – 1904 Vikram Samvat) lived at Rainawari, Srinagar and wrote Persian poetry under the pen name (takhalus) of Betab. Betab made an important contribution to Persian poetry and he commanded great respect among the poets of Kashmir of his time. Betab was an exceptional poet whose Persian poetry reached as far as Central Asia. Some critics have rated Betab's works at par with the Shahnama of Firdausi. Betab was also proficient with reading and writing Arabic.

Mulla Mohammad Taufiq Kashmiri, another popular Persian poet of the era who lived near Jama Masjid area of Srinagar and wrote under takhalus Taufiq, was a contemporary of Betab. Betab was a frequent visitor to the Court (Durbar) of Pandit Raja Kak Dar, who was also a gifted poet and wrote under takhalus Farukh.

Betab's comprehensive collection (Diwan) of poems was first published fourteen (14) years after his death in 1861 CE.

- in Kashmiri language Taba is a short name for Aftab (meaning Sun in Persian)

== Origin ==
Betab's ancestors originally hailed from village Turkipora in Rajwar Tehsil of Kupwara district. This village was previously named Trikhapora.

Betab's ancestors relocated to Srinagar during the reign of Budshah. In the next few hundred years, Betab's ancestors moved around to live at various localities of Srinagar before settling at Motiyar Rainawari.

== Occupation ==
After completing his education Betab was appointed as an administrative official (Kardar) at village Breng in Anantnag area of the valley, where he spent most of his service life.

== Compositions ==
Betab composed his writings in the form of masnawis which contain historical details of his times (a masnawi is a long epic poem describing battles fought and past events, and may also include philosophical or ethical themes).

Betab was summoned to Kabul and honoured by the general and wazir of Afghanistan, Prince Mohammad Akbar Khan. Betab praised his patron Mohammad Akbar Khan in the poem Akbar-nama. Akbar Khan was a great lover of fine Arts.

Betab then witnessed the invasion of the Sikh army of Maharaja Ranjit Singh over his native land Kashmir and the defeat of the Afghan governor Muhammad Azim Khan in 1819 CE, which he versified under the title Jang-nama.

After the change of rulers, Betab visited Lahore for a meeting with Maharaja Ranjit Singh. Betab was honoured by Maharaja Ranjit Singh in his Durbar, where he also met the powerful and influential Raja Dina Nath, who was Finance Minister of Maharaja Ranjit Singh. Following his return from Lahore, Betab composed one more masnawi containing historical details like the other two named Ranjit-nama.

== Style ==
On one occasion someone recited Taufiq's verse (sher) - shikasta rangiye man ba tabeeb dar jung ast /ilaje darde saram husne sandali rang ast, which was applauded by all present in the gathering. Pandit Raja Kak Dhar who was present in the gathering threw a challenge: could anyone compose a better sher in the same style and manner? Betab accepted the challenge on the condition that he should be suitably rewarded, and produced a masterpiece, siyah bakhtam wa az bakhte khaesh khursandam /chara ki bakhte man wa zulfe yar hum rang ast.

Pandit Raja Kak Dhar immediately ordered his men to deliver one hundred Kharwars (legacy measure of weight in Kashmir; 1 Kharwar = 177 Pounds or about 80 kg) of paddy to Betab's residence.

== Reviews ==
J.K. Banerji in the book Encyclopaedia of Kashmir wrote "Outstanding among the Hindu Pandits who made important contributions to Persian poetry may be mentioned the name of Pandit Taba Ram Turki 'Betab' whose Jang Nama reached classic heights."

Eminent historian and author Pandit Gwasha Lal Kaul in the same encyclopaedia mentions "Jang Nama by Taba Ram Turki stands on the same footing as Shah Nama of Firdausi".

Eminent Kashmiri politician, scholar and author Prem Nath Bazaz in the book Inside Kashmir[12] states "Pandit Taba Ram Turki 'Betab' (1840 A.D.) whose Jang Nama stands on par with Shah Nama of Firdausi lived during the time of the Sikhs".

Betab's Masnawis are prescribed for postgraduate studies in the University of Tehran.
