= Muzaffar Aazim =

Kashmiri-American poet

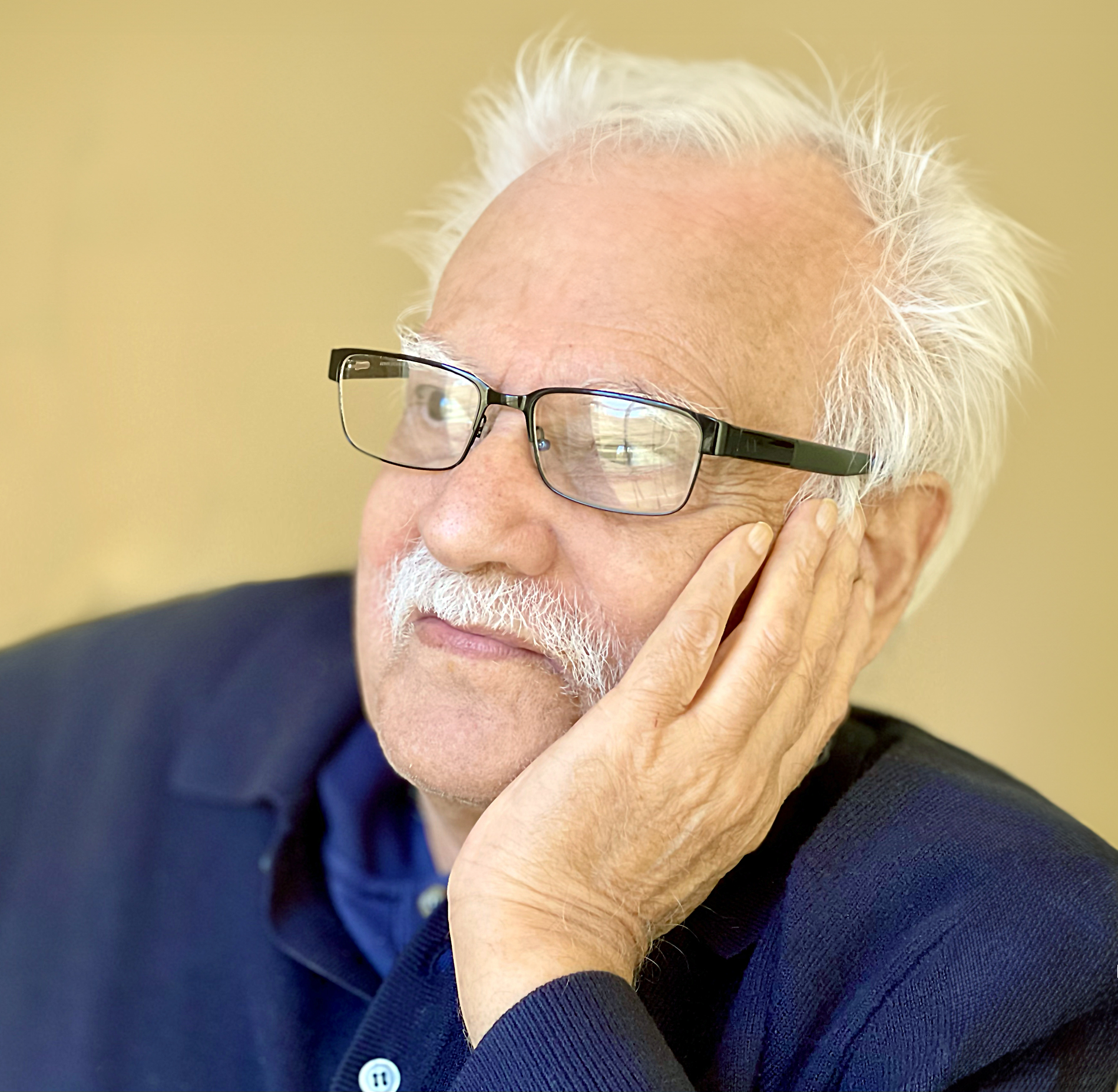
- Born: Mohammad Muzaffar Mir; April 29, 1934; Tangmarg, Jammu & Kashmir, British India
- Died: July 8, 2022 (aged 88); Woodbridge, Virginia, USA
- Citizenship: Kashmiri-American
- Occupations: Poet, Writer, Director Sericulture
- Notable work: Poetry collections: Zolana (1963), Mani-Kaman (1974), Saze-Salasil (2005), Harf Dai (2007), Translations: War & Peace (1977), Wuthering Heights (1987), ‘Iyaruingam’ Awami Raj (1988) Mahmud Gami (Makers of Indian Literature), (1991) ‘Yak Rang’ poems of Anwar War Anwar (2012) Drama: Nai-Mout, Srinagar Door Darshan; Hawas ta Haasil, Radio Kashmir Created the first Kashmiri Narqalam font and Gulmarg Nastalik font
- Movement: Progressive Writers Movement, Modernism
- Awards: Academy of Art, Culture and Languages, Kashmir; Soviet Land Nehru Award,1978

Muzaffar Aazim was a Kashmiri-American poet and a writer of the Kashmiri language

== Early life and career ==
Muzaffar Aazim was born in 1934 in picturesque hillside Tangmarg town located along Himalaya mountains in erstwhile Jammu & Kashmir State of India. He graduated from Sri Pratap College and briefly taught at Amar Singh College. He later became the Director of Sericulture in Kashmir, a position that enabled him to travel widely.

== Kashmiri font and script promotion ==
He was instrumental in promoting Kashmiri poetry and language in digital media, partly by creating the first Kashmiri Narqalam font and Gulmarg Nastalik font. In collaboration with other language experts, he pushed for improvement in Unicode to better represent Kashmiri language. This enables almost seven million Kashmiri speaking population worldwide to write in their chosen language.

== Literary works ==
Aazim started writing poetry at the age of 10 and published his first Kashmiri poetry book Zolana (The Fetters) in 1963. His contemporary, noted Kashmir poet Rahman Rahi, writing about this book comments that “The chief quality that distinguishes Aazim from almost all other poets of his age is his dexterity as a craftsman, a quality which can be appreciated in his ghazals”. His second Kashmiri poetry book was Manikaman (The Desire). His other poetry books include Saze-Salasil (The Rhythm of the Chains) in Urdu and Haraf Dai (Two and a Half Words) in Kashmiri. He authored Mahmud Gami, (Makers of Indian Literature) published by Sahitya Akademi. He compiled a comprehensive review on "Experiments in Modern Kashmiri Poetry" in Indian Literature, also published by Sahitya Akademi.

He published ‘Yak Rang’, a popular collection of unpublished poems by mystic Kashmiri poet Anwar War Anwar (1873-1905). He has appeared multiple times on television to discuss poetry, literature, and life. He has written several plays for All India Radio Srinagar including Havas ta Haasil (Longing and Gain), and for Doordarshan TV including Nai Mout (The Flute Fakir). He started abstract digital art in 2014. This became his main, and a popular, outlet of creative expression in the later years of his life.

== Translations ==
Muzaffar Aazim translated many classics into Kashmiri including Tolstoy’s War & Peace published by Cultural Academy. He also translated Emily Bronte’s Wuthering Heights, and Awami Raj, originally written as Iyaruingam (Peoples Rule) in Assamese by B.K. Bhattacharya and published by Sahitya Akademi.

== Popular songs ==
Muzaffar Aazim wrote many melodious Kashmiri songs that are mostly played on All India Radio Srinagar and quickly became favorites. "Asi bor wizi wizi" was adopted by the University of Kashmir as an anthem for 3 years. ‘Yina sa cheshman’, a song he dedicated to his wife became a classic. Other songs include ‘Jigar zakhmi’ and ‘Yena zulfow chanew’, both still very popular.

== Awards and honors ==
Muzaffar Aazim received the best book award for two of his Kashmiri poetry collections ‘Zolana’ and ‘Manikaman’ by Jammu & Kashmir Academy of Art, Culture & Languages. He was awarded Soviet Land Nehru Award for translating ‘War & Peace. He also received a ‘Dastar Bandi’ by Jammu and Kashmir Academy of Art, Culture and Languages.

== Death ==
Muzaffar Aazim died on July 8, 2022, in Woodbridge, Virginia.

== See also ==
- Literature of Kashmir
