= Vatsun =

Literary form in Kashmiri language

Vatsun (/ˈvætʃən/, Kashmiri: [vat͡sun]) is a Kashmiri literary form derived from Sanskrit Vachan meaning "word/speech". This is because it has no particular pattern of versification or rhyme scheme. The metres and rhyme schemes of vatsun are varied, but generally each unit is a stanza of three lines followed by a refrain (vooj).

In poetry, it is a popular age-old folk-form dating back to the 14th century, when Lal Ded and Sheikh-ul-Alam (alias Nund Rishi) wrote in the Kashmiri language the devotional poetry depicting their mystic experiences, love for God, love for others, and folk dancing.

Vatsun bears a resemblance to Urdu lyric. Vatsun is also similar to the iambic pentameter of the Western world.

== Notable Vatsun poets ==
- Lal Ded (1320–1392)
- Nund Rishi (1377–1438)
- Habba Khatoon (1554–1609)
- Arnimal (1737–1778)
- Dina Nath Nadim (1916–1988)

== See also ==
- ghazal
- Iambic Pentameter
