= Rupa Bhawani =

Indian Kashmiri writer (c. 1620 – c. 1720)

Mata Rupa Bhawani (c. 1621 – c. 1721 birth name: Alakheswari ) was a Kashmiri poet. Bhawani was a 17th-century Hindu saint who lived in present-day Kashmir.

== Early life ==
She was the daughter of Pandit Madhav Joo Dhar, a resident of Khankah-i-Shokta, Nawakadal (now Srinagar), in the early 17th century. He introduced her to the practices of yoga.

Oral and written legend has it that Madhav Joo Dhar was an ardent devotee of Mata Sharika (Kali). He visited her temple daily at Hari Parvat to pray and asked for a daughter. Bhawani was born to Joo's wife on Poornamashi in the month of Zyeth (Jyeshta) in 1621. The exact year of her birth varies in a different account between 1620 and 1624. Bhawani followed her father in pursuit of God and spirituality.

== Career ==
Even after her marriage at an early age, she often visited Hari Parvat to perform her Sadhana at midnight. This raised questions about her, as a woman out on her own. Her mother-in-law and husband mistreated her. Ultimately, she left her in-law's house in the pursuit of God.

Bhawani performed her Sadhana in solitude at Chashme Shahbi, Manigam, at Ganderbal district in J&K Lar and Vaskura. These places, including her birthplace at Safa Kadal, are now famous as Ropa Bhawani Asthapanas.

Mata Rupa Bhawani died on maag gat’tu pachh satam in 1721 AD. This day became known as Sahib Saptami and is observed by Hindus in Kashmir.
