= Wahab Khar =

Kashmiri Sufi poet, metaphysist, saint

- عبدُل وہاب کھار
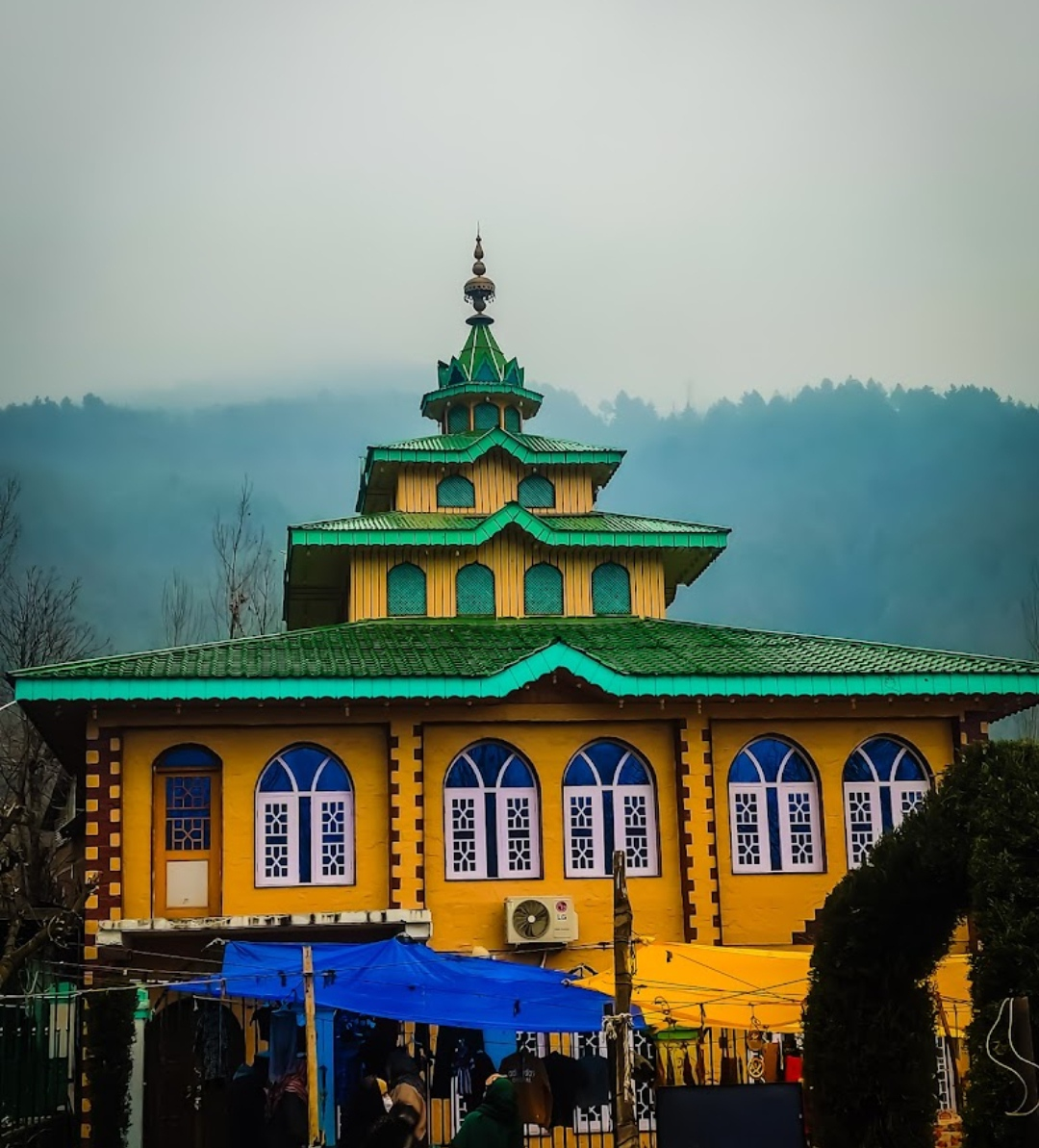
- Born: Abdul Wahab Khar c. 1842; Jammu and Kashmir princely state (in modern-day Jammu and Kashmir) (Note: none of the added sources have mentioned the subject's birth place. Since the subject was a Kashmiri poet, which indicates that his birth place "Jammu and Kashmir princely state")
- Died: 13 April 1912; Jammu and Kashmir (Note: His shrine is located in Pampore town and it appears that he might have died in the same area, though none of the added sources have mentioned that.)
- Resting place: Vostur van shaar shali Pampore
- Occupation: Farmer
- Writing career
- Language: Kashmiri
- Period: 19th century To 20th century
- Subject: Sufism

Abdul Wahab Khar (c. 1842 – c. 1912), also appears as Wahab Khar, was the 19th-century Kashmiri Sufi mystic poet and saint. He is sometimes referred to as "scholar" & "metaphysist" for his contribution to the literature & Tasawuf. He was actively engaged in writing Sufi devotional poems and used to attend musical gatherings throughout his life. From the poetry's perspective, he is primarily known for his devotional poetic book titled Verses of Wahab Khar, comprising Kashmiri language poems which was later published by the Kashmir Jay Kay Books in 2007.

== Biography ==
Wahab was born around 1842. However, some news media have cited his birth as 1910. He had not received any formal education, but was believed to have psychological abilities and conceptual approach such as moral reasoning. After covering Sufism in his poetry, he was then regarded as a saint, and his Urs (death anniversary) is celebrated every year in the month of April inside the premises of his dargah (Sufi shrine) at Pampore, Jammu and Kashmir. Besides Sufi Muslims, his shrine is frequently visited by the devotees from the different religious, including Christians, Sikhs and Hindus.

Wahab is claimed to "sprung out a hot water spring amid a forest on his own". The spring he sprung out still flows in the Kashmir Valley.
