= Rehman Rahi =

Kashmiri poet (1925–2023)

Rahman Rahi
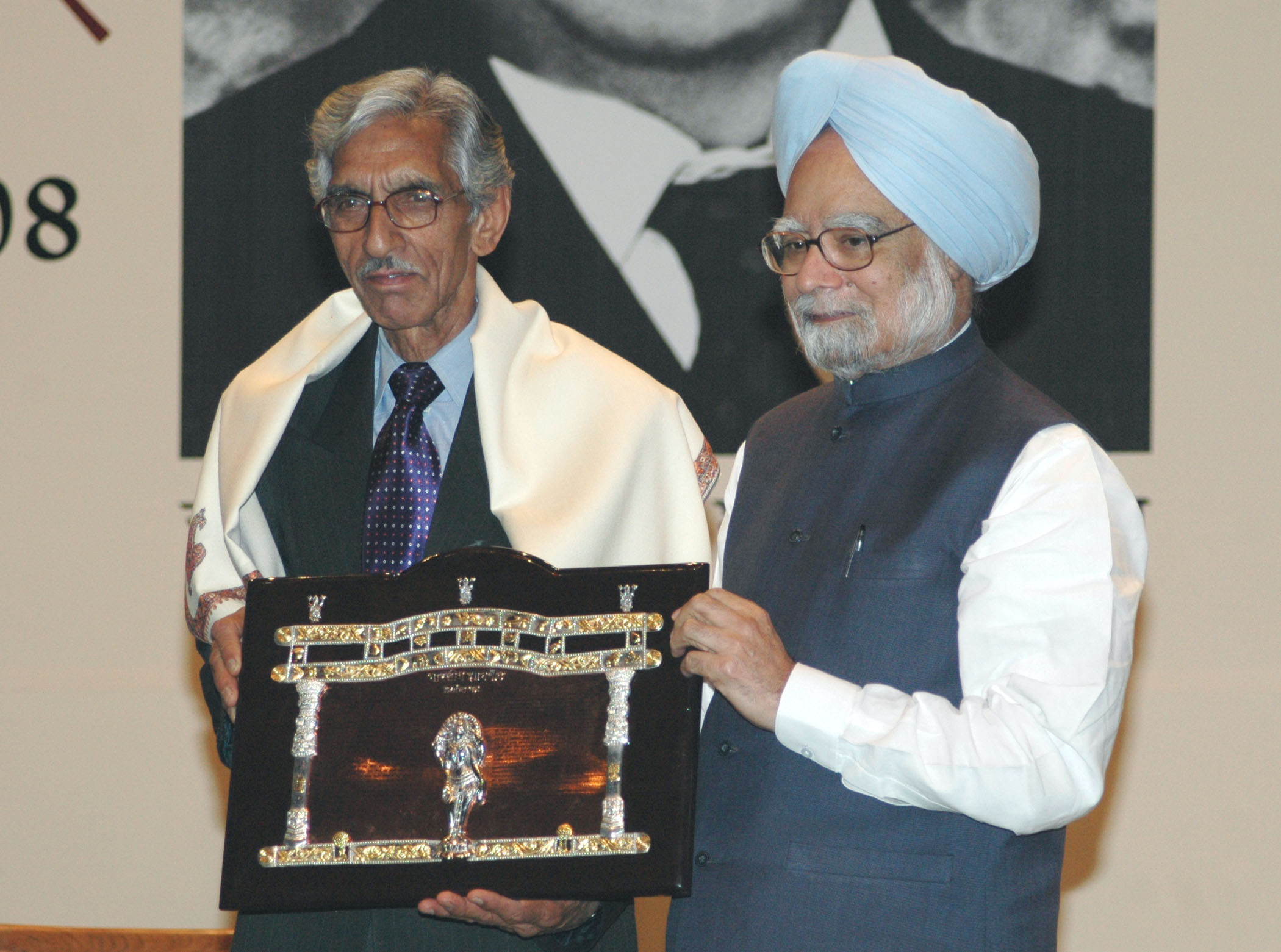
- Rahman Rahi receiving Jnanpith Award in New Delhi
- Born: Abdur Rahman Rahi; 6 May 1925; Srinagar, Jammu and Kashmir, British Raj
- Died: 9 January 2023 (aged 97); Srinagar, Jammu and Kashmir, India
- Occupations: Poet, translator, critic
- Awards: Sahitya Akademi Award and Padma Shri (2000); Jnanpith Award (2004)

Abdur Rehman Rahi (Kashmiri: رَحمان راہی; 6 May 1925 – 9 January 2023) was a Kashmiri poet, translator and critic. He was awarded the Indian Sahitya Akademi Award in 1961 for his poetry collection Nawroz-i-Saba, the Padma Shri in 2000, and India's highest literary award, the Jnanpith Award (for the year 2004) in 2007. He is the first Kashmiri writer to be awarded the Jnanpith, India's highest literary award for his poetic collection Siyah Rood Jaeren Manz (In Black Drizzle). He was honoured with Sahitya Akademi Fellowship in 2000 by Sahitya Akademi, New Delhi.

== Life and career ==
Born in 1925, Rehman Rahi began his career as a clerk in the Public Works Department of the Government for few months in 1948 and was associated with the Progressive Writers' Association, of which he became the General Secretary. He also edited a few issues of Kwang Posh, the literary journal of the Progressive Writer's Association. He was later a sub-editor in the Urdu daily Khidmat. He did an M.A. in Persian (1952) and in English (1962) from Jammu and Kashmir University where he taught Persian. He was on the editorial board of the Urdu daily Aajkal in Delhi from 1953 to 1955. He was also associated with the Cultural wing of the communist Party of Kashmir during his student days. As translator he did translation of Baba Farid's Sufi poetry to Kashmiri from the original Punjabi. Camus and Sartre are some visible effects on his poems while Dina Nath Naadim's influence on his poetry is also visible especially in earlier works.

Rahi died on 9 January 2023, at the age of 97.

== Published works ==
Rahi's major works include:

- Sana-Wani Saaz (poems) (1952)
- Sukhok Soda (poems)
- Kalam-e-Rahi (poems)
- Nawroz-i-Saba (poems) (1958)
- Kahwat (literary criticism)
- Kashir Shara Sombran
- Azich Kashir Shayiri
- Kashir Naghmati Shayiri
- Baba Fareed (translation)
- Saba Moallaqat
- Farmove Zartushtadia
