= Shamas Faqir =

Kashmiri Sufi poet and mystic (1839–1916)

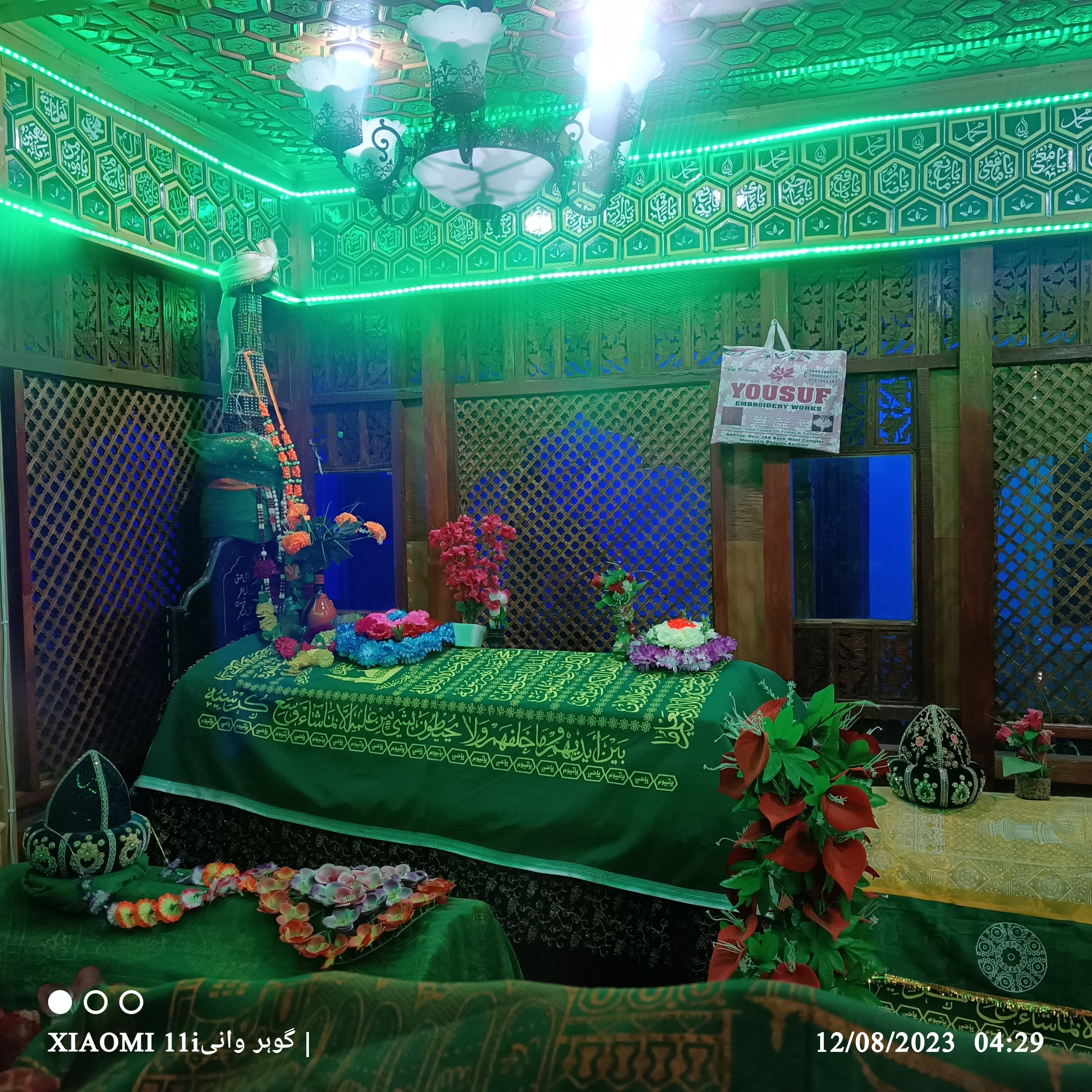
- Faqir's tomb

Personal life
- Born: Mohammad Sidiq Sheikh; 1843 Chinkral Mohalla, near Habba Kadal, Srinagar, Kashmir
- Died: 1901 (aged 57–58)
- Resting place: Braripora (Shamasabad), Khansahib, Budgam, Kashmir
- Era: 19th century
- Region: Jammu and Kashmir
- Main interest(s): Sufism, Tasawwuf
- Notable work: Merajnama
- Other names: Shamas Seab, Shah Shamas
- Occupation: Sufi poet

Religious life
- Religion: Islam
- Denomination: Ishq (Sufi)
- Tariqa: Qadiriyya

Muslim leader
- Influenced by: Mohammad Na‘īm, Rasūl Shāh Hākih-Tsr

Muhammad Sidiq Bhat (1839–1916), better known as Shamas Faqir (Kashmiri: شَمَس فَقیٖر or Shams Faqīr was a 19th-century Kashmiri Sufi poet, mystic, and follower of the Qadiriyya Sufi order. He is regarded as one of the most influential voices in Kashmiri devotional poetry.

== Early life ==
Mohammad Sidiq Sheikh (also referred to as Mohammad Sidiq Bhat) was born in 1843 into a humble family in Chinkral Mohalla, Habba Kadal, Srinagar.

== Spiritual journey ==
Shamas Faqir became a disciple of various Sufi saints including Souch Maliar, Abdul Rehman of Barzulla, Atiq-Ullah of Gulab Bagh, Mohammad Jammal, and Rasool Saeb.

At the age of 25, he left for Amritsar, Punjab, where he studied under the Sufi saint Rasūl Shāh Hākih-Tsr. After returning to Kashmir, he lived in Anantnag, married, and later returned to his ancestral home in Srinagar. He then entered a prolonged meditative retreat in a cave in Qazi Bagh, Budgam, where he remained in solitude for six months before settling in Braripora, now known as Shamasabad, in the Khansahib area of Budgam.

== Poetic style and symbolism ==
His poem Merajnama describes Prophet Muhammad’s celestial ascent (Mi‘raj), a symbol of spiritual elevation and union. His use of metaphor—such as rivers, lamps, dust, and wine—aligns with traditional Sufi symbolic language.

== Cultural context ==
Shamas Faqir emerged from a rich spiritual landscape where the Rishi and Sufi traditions intermingled. Kashmir’s devotional culture, marked by saints such as Lal Ded and Nund Rishi, deeply influenced his thought. His poetry reflects this syncretism—drawing from Hindu mysticism, Islamic philosophy, and indigenous Kashmiri values like simplicity and universal brotherhood.

== Scholarly attention and translations ==
In contemporary scholarship, Shamas Faqir has been the subject of academic work highlighting the spiritual and literary dimensions of Kashmiri Sufi poetry. Dr. Saltanat Farooq, in her translations of his verses, situates his work within a global Sufi literary framework, bringing attention to Kashmir’s overlooked mystical literature.
