= List of Kashmiri people =

This is an incomplete list of notable persons of Kashmiri origin.

== Activists ==
- Ataullah Shah Bukhari, Indian freedom struggle activist.
- Parveena Ahanger, co-founder and chairman of the Association of Parents of Disappeared Persons (APDP), nominated for a Nobel Peace Prize in 2005.
- Parvez Imroz, Kashmiri human rights lawyer and a civil rights activist.
- Mushtaq Pahalgami, Social Activist, Environmentalist, President Himalayan Welfare Organization, Pahalgam
- Khurram Parvez, Kashmiri human rights activist.
- Sanaullah Amritsari, Indian freedom struggle activist and co-founder of Jamia Millia Islamia
- Shehla Rashid, Political and civil rights activist.
- Ayub Thakur, (1948 – 2004) Kashmiri political activist and founder of London-based World Kashmir Freedom Movement (WKFM).

== Administrators, diplomats, bankers and jurists ==
- Amitabh Mattoo (1962– ), Vice Chancellor, Jammu University, thinker & writer, Padma Shri awardee
- Bakshi Ghulam Mohammad, Prime Minister Jammu and Kashmir 1953 to 1964.
- Baseer Ahmad Khan (1958- ), Advisor to Governor and Former Divisional Commissioner Kashmir.
- Birbal Dhar (early 19th century), invited Maharaja Ranjit Singh to Kashmir
- Braj Kumar Nehru (1909–2001), ambassador of India to the United States (1961–1968) and Governor of Assam (1968–1973)
- Durga Prasad Dhar (1918–1975), ambassador of India to the Soviet Union, and politician
- Farah Pandith (1969– ), U.S. State Department Special Representative
- Farooq Abdullah, former Cabinet Minister and Former Chief Minister of Jammu and Kashmir
- Farooq Khan, ex IPS, credited with creating JKP SOG.
- Ghulam Nabi Azad (1949 born), politician and former CM of Jammu and Kashmir.
- Haidar Malik, Kashmiri administrator of the Mughals
- Haji Gokool Meah, industrialist and businessman in Trinidad and Tobago
- M. L. Madan, Veterinarian, Scientist, Administrator.
- Masood Khan, Career Diplomat and President of Azad Jammu & Kashmir[
- Markandey Katju, (1946-), Former Judge at the Supreme Court of India
- Masud Choudhary (1944–2022), Prominent educator, social reformer and former administrator vice-chancellor.
- Mehraj Mattoo (1961– ), British Investment Banker, Economist, Harvard Fellow
- Mirza Pandit Dhar, Kashmiri during the rule of Azim Khan
- Mohan Lal (1812–1877), diplomat in the First Anglo-Afghan War, and writer
- Neel Kashkari (1973– ), Interim Assistant Secretary of the Treasury for Financial Stability in the US Treasury
- P. K. Kaul (1929–2007), ambassador of India to the United States (1986–1989)
- Purushottam Narayan Haksar (1913–1998), political strategist
- Rafiq Ahmad Pampori (born 1956), Islamic scholar, author and the former Principal of the Government Medical College, Srinagar.
- Rameshwar Nath Kao (1918–2002), first chief of the Research and Analysis Wing, India's intelligence agency (from 1969 to 1977)
- Sameera Fazili, Kashmiri American attorney and community development finance expert who is a deputy director of the National Economic Council in the Biden administration.
- Satish Dhawan ISRO chief
- Shah Faesal IAS topper (2009), youth icon, politician
- Sheikh Abdullah (5 December 1905 – 8 September 1982), Leader of the National Conference, Prime Minister of the state of Jammu and Kashmir after its accession to India in 1947.
- T.N. Kaul (1913–2000), ambassador of India to USA (1973–1976), Soviet Union & Iran. Foreign Secretary, Indian Ministry of External Affairs.
- V. N. Kaul Comptroller and Auditor General of India (2002–2008).
- Tej Bahadur Sapru (1875–1949), lawyer, political and social leader during the British Raj
- Triloki Nath Khoshoo (1927–2002), secretary of the Department of Environment in the Indira Gandhi Government, and environmentalist
- Vijaya Lakshmi Pandit (1900–1990), ambassador of India to the United States (1949–1952), President of the United Nations General Assembly (1953), politician, sister of Jawaharlal Nehru
- Zafar Choudhary Journalist, author, policy analyst, and practitioner of peace-building.
- Zaffar Iqbal Manhas writer, poet, social activist and Pahari politician hailing from Jammu and Kashmir.

== Armed forces ==
- Brij Mohan Kaul, commanded the Indian forces in the Sino-Indian War
- Colonel Anil Kaul, VrC, Indian Army
- Mahendra Nath Mulla
- Mohammed Amin Naik, Major General Indian Army
- Mushaf Ali Mir, Air Chief Marshal (1947–2003) Chief of the Air Staff of the Pakistan Air Force (2000–2003)
- S. K. Kaul (1934– ), Air Chief Marshal of the Indian Air Force, former Chief of Air Staff (1993–1995)
- Tahir Rafique Butt, Air Chief Marshal is the current Chief of the Air Staff of Pakistan Air Force (2012 -)
- Tapishwar Narain Raina (1921–1980), [Chief of Army Staff of the Indian Army (1975–1978)

== Authors and poets ==
- Abdul Ahad Azad, Kashmiri poet
- Agha Shahid Ali, (1949–2001) Poet
- Amin Kamil (1924–2014), Kashmiri poet & short story writer
- Ata ul Haq Qasmi, Urdu-language Poet, playwright and columnist.
- Basharat Peer (1977– ), author
- Bhamaha Poet of kavyalankara
- Bilhana, 11th century poet
- Chandrakanta (1938– ), novelist and short story writer
- Dina Nath Walli alias Al-mast Kashmiri (1908–2006), poet as well as renowned water color artist
- Fazil Kashmiri (1916–2004) poet and lyricist, involved in Arabic, English, Persian, Urdu and particularly in Kashmiri literature
- Gani Kashmiri (c. 1630 – c. 1669), 17th-century Persian-language poet
- Ghulam Ahmad Mahjoor (1885–1952), poet, better known by the pen name Mahjoor
- Ghulam Nabi Firaq (1922-), poet, writer and educationist
- Habba Khatun 16th century poet, known as Zoon (the Moon) because of her immense beauty
- Haidar Malik (fl.1621 CE) Kashmiri administrator of the Mughals, known for writing Tarikh-i-Kashmir
- Hakeem Manzoor (1937–2006) an Urdu writer, poet & administrator. He has written more than 15 books including Na Tamaam, Barf Ruton Ki Aag and Lahu Lamas Chinar.
- Hanifa Deen, Australian writer winner of New South Wales Premier's Literary Awards — Ethnic Affairs Commission Award of 1996.
- Hari Kunzru (1969– ), British novelist of Kashmiri descent
- Javaid Rahi (1970) Tribal researcher of national repute working on tribal Gujjar culture.
- Khalid Hasan (1935–2009) writer, senior Pakistani journalist and diplomat.
- Krishna Hutheesing (1907–1967), author, and sister of Jawaharlal Nehru
- Madhosh Balhami, (1966-), poet known for his elegies for dead militants
- Mahmud Gami (1765–1855), composed a version of the story of Yusuf and Zulaikha
- Manju Kak, short story writer
- Maqbool Shah Kralawari (1820–1876), lyricist
- Marghoob Banihali, Kashmiri poet from Banihal, Kashmir.
- Meeraji (1912–1949) Urdu poet, lived the life of a bohemian and worked only intermittently
- Mirza Waheed British Novelist born and raised in Kashmir.
- Mohi ud-Din Miskin (d.1921), poet and writer, wrote a history of Kashmir 'Tarikh-i-Kabir'
- Mohiuddin Hajni (1917–1993) writer, critic, political activist and teacher.
- Momin Khan Momin (1800–1851) poet known for his Urdu ghazals
- Moti Lal Kemmu (1933– ), playwright
- Muhammad Din Fauq (1877–1945) writer and first journalist of Kashmir.
- Muhammad Iqbal (1877–1938) Muslim poet and philosopher. Commonly referred to as Allama Iqbal
- Mullah Nadiri (fl.1420 CE) Kashmiri poet of Persian-language, known for writing Tarikh-i-Kashmir
- Naseem Shafaie (b.1952), Kashmiri-language poet.
- Nayantara Sahgal (1927– ), Indo-Anglian writer, novelist
- Nyla Ali Khan, Professor, writer, granddaughter of Sheikh Abdullah.
- Pamposh Bhat, (1958– ), author and environmentalist.
- Predhuman K Joseph Dhar, author, social worker and a writer
- Rahul Pandita, Kashmiri author and journalist.
- Rasul Mir, also known as the John Keats of Kashmir.
- Rehman Rahi, Kashmiri poet
- Rudrata poet
- S.L. Sadhu (1917–2012), Scholar, Professor, poet, writer, folklorist and Historian
- Saadat Hasan Manto (1912–1955), short story writer, member Progressive Writers' Movement
- Salman Rushdie (1947– ), British-Indian novelist and essayist
- Santha Rama Rau (1923– 2009), travel writer
- Sheikh Showkat Hussain (1954– ), author and political analyst
- Tanha Ansari (1914 – 1969), poet
- Vishnu Sharma author of panchtantra
- Zareef Ahmad Zareef (b.1943), poet, writer, social activist and environmentalist, best known for his satirical poetry and efforts to highlight various social and political problems.
- Zinda Kaul (1884–1965), poet, also known as Masterji
- Zulfiqar Naqvi Urdu poet and English lecturer, from Mendhar Tehsil, Jammu and Kashmir

== Businesspeople and industrialists ==
- Farooq Kathwari (born 1944), American businessman, CEO of Ethan Allen
- Gokool, (Haji Gokool Meah) Trinidadian and Tobagonian industrialist, philanthropist, and cinema magnate
- Jamim Shah, Nepali businessman, known as Cable King of Nepal

== Philosophers and historians ==
- Abhinavagupta, (ca. 950–1020), Kashmiri philosopher, mystic and aesthetician
- Ahmad Hasan Dani (1920–2009), intellectual, archaeologist, historian, linguist
- Anandavardhana (820–890), philosopher and author of the Dhvanyaloka
- Bhaskara, writer on the Kashmir Shaivism
- Bhatta Kallata, a Shaivite thinker
- Gopi Krishna (1903–1980), writer and mystic
- Hassan Khoyihami (c. 1832–1898) historian, poet and scholar
- Jonaraja (15th century), historian and poet
- Kalhana (12th century), historian and author of Rajatarangini
- Kalidasa (most likely 5CE) classic Sanskrit author
- Kshemaraja (10th century), philosopher and a disciple of Abhinavagupta
- Kumarajiva (4th n 5 century CE), Buddhist scholar in China
- Lalleshwari (1320–1392), saint-poet
- Muhammed Azam Didamari (1691–1765), historian and author of Waqiat-i-Kashmir
- Prajna Bhatta (16th century), historian
- Prem Nath Bazaz Kashmiri politician, scholar and author
- Shrivara (15th century), historian
- Somananda (875–925) a teacher of Kashmir Shaivism
- Subhash Kak (1947– ), writer, philosopher, and computer scientist
- Utpaladeva, a teacher of Kashmir Shaivism
- Vasugupta (860–925), author of the Shiva Sutras of Vasugupta

== Politicians ==
- Abdul Ghani Lone (1932–2002), lawyer, politician and founder of the People's Conference
- Abid Hassan Minto Pakistani lawyer and politician
- Agha Shorish Kashmiri scholar, writer, debater, and leader of the Majlis-e-Ahrar-ul-Islam, figure of the freedom movement of undivided India
- Aga Syed Ruhullah Mehdi, Indian politician, Member of Parliament, Lok Sabha
- Asiya Andrabi (1963), Chief Of Dukhtaran-e-Millat, Kashmiri separatist leader
- Attique Ahmed Khan President and Prime Minister of Azad Jammu & Kashmir
- Bakshi Ghulam Mohammad (1907–1972), Prime Minister of Jammu and Kashmir (1953–1963)
- Begum Akbar Jehan Abdullah, Politician, wife of Sheikh Abdullah
- Birbal Dhar leader in the Kashmiri resistance to Afghan rule in the early 19th century
- Birbal also Maheshdas Bhat (1528–1586), the Grand Vizier (Wazīr-e Azam) of the Mughal court in the administration of Emperor Akbar
- Deepa Kaul (1944– ), former minister, social worker and human rights defender
- Firdous Tak, former Member of Legislative Council
- G. M. Saroori former minister of Jammu and Kashmir for mechanical engineering and Road and building (R&B)
- G. N. Ratanpuri (1954–), Member of Parliament (Rajya Sabha) from J&K National Conference
- Ghulam Ahmad Ashai, educator, reformer, a founder of the University of Kashmir
- Ghulam Mohammad Sadiq, Prime Minister of Jammu and Kashmir (1964–1965), Chief Minister of Jammu and Kashmir (1965–1971)
- Ghulam Mohammad Shah (1920–2009)), Chief Minister of Jammu and Kashmir (1984–1986)
- Ghulam Nabi Azad (1949– ), former Chief Minister of Jammu and Kashmir
- Hina Pervaiz Butt, Pakistani politician and MLA.
- Indira Gandhi (1917–1984), Prime Minister of India, daughter of Jawaharlal Nehru
- Ishaq Dar, Federal Minister of Pakistan
- Jawaharlal Nehru (1889–1964), first Prime Minister of independent India
- Kailash Nath Katju (1887–1968), freedom fighter, lawyer, participated in INA trials, former governor, chief minister of several Indian states, cabinet minister under Jawaharlal Nehru
- Khalid Ibrahim Khan, Politician
- Col. Khan Muhammad Khan, member of the Jammu & Kashmir Assembly from 1934 to 1946. Chairman War Council of Azad Jammu & Kashmir in 1947 and then member Defence Council.
- Khan Muhammad Khan of Mong
- Khawaja Asif MNA Sailkot PML-N
- Khawaja Saad Rafique Pakistani Minister of Railways
- Khurshid Hasan Khurshid, First elected President of Azad Kashmir (1924–1988)
- Khwaja Shams-ud-Din (1922–1999), Prime Minister of Jammu and Kashmir (1963–1964)
- Kiran Imran Dar, MNA of National Assembly of Pakistan
- Maqbool Bhat (1938–1984), co-founder of the JKLF Party
- Masarat Alam Bhat, Separatist leader
- Mazhar Ali Azhar (1895–1974) one of founders, leader of Majlis-e-Ahrar-ul-Islam, political figure in the history of Sub-Continent
- Mehbooba Mufti (1959– ), female politician, member of the 14th Lok Sabha. Mirza Mehboob Beg succeeded her and got elected to the 15th Lok Sabha.
- Mirza Afzal Beg (d.1982) was the first Deputy Chief Minister of Jammu and Kashmir and was the Founder of All Jammu and Kashmir Plebiscite Front.
- Mirza Mehboob Beg (1949-), former Lok Sabha member for Anantnag and Cabinet Minister in the Jammu and Kashmir Legislative Assembly twice and Jammu and Kashmir Legislative Council once.
- Mohammad Farooq Shah (1944–1990), Mirwaiz of Kashmir, chairman of the Aawami Action Committee
- Mohammad Shafi Qureshi, (1929– ), former governor of Bihar and of Madhya Pradesh, State Railway Minister
- Mohammad Yasin, British Labour Party politician serving as the Member of Parliament
- Motilal Nehru (1861–1931), Indian independence activist, president of the Indian National Congress
- Mufti Mohammad Sayeed (1936– 2016), Chief Minister of Jammu and Kashmir (2002–2005)
- Muhammad Abdul Qayyum Khan President and Prime minister of Azad Jammu & Kashmir
- Muhammad Yusuf Shah (1894–1968), politician, Mirwaiz of Kashmir, twice President of Azad Kashmir.
- Muzaffar Hussain Baig (1946– ), Deputy Chief Minister, Finance Minister, Law Minister, Tourism Minister of Jammu & Kashmir (2002–2008)
- Nasir Aslam Wani, Provincial President JKNC and former Home Minister of Jammu & Kashmir
- Nawaz Sharif (1949– ), former Prime Minister of Pakistan
- Nazir Ahmed, Baron Ahmed (born 1957) is a member of the House of Lords of the United Kingdom. He was created a life peer on the recommendation of Prime Minister Tony Blair in 1998.
- Neel Kashkari (1973- ), American banker and politician
- Omar Abdullah (1970– ), Chief Minister Jammu And Kashmir, member of the 14th Lok Sabha, son of Farooq Abdullah
- Peer Mohammed Hussain (1941- ), former Minister of State Jammu and Kashmir and founding member of Jammu and Kashmir People's Democratic Party.
- Qurban Hussain (born 27 March 1956 in Kotli, Azad Kashmir) is a British–Pakistani Liberal Democrat politician and life peer.
- Rajiv Gandhi (1944–1991), Prime Minister of India, son of Indira Gandhi, grandson of Jawaharlal Nehru
- Ram Chandra Kak (1893–1983), Prime Minister of Jammu and Kashmir during 1945–47 and an archaeologist
- Sadiq Ali (1952– ), politician, poet, writer, and environmentalist
- Saifuddin Kitchlew (1888–1963), freedom fighter and politician
- Saifuddin Soz (1937– ), long-time member of the Parliament of India, former Union Minister of Environment & Forests, former Minister of Water Resources, President JKPCC
- Sakina Itoo, former minister of social welfare and tourism department.
- Sardar Ibrahim Khan, (1915 – 2003), founder and first President of Azad Jammu & Kashmir
- Shabana Mahmood, British Labour Party politician and barrister. Member of Parliament (MP) for Birmingham.
- Shabir Shah (1953– ), Founder of the Jammu & Kashmir Democratic Freedom Party. Known as Nelson Mandela of Indian Administered Kashmir
- Shehbaz Sharif, Prime Minister of Pakistan.
- Sheikh Abdullah (1905–1982), Prime Minister of Jammu and Kashmir (1948–1953), Chief Minister of Jammu and Kashmir (1975–1977, 1977–1982)
- Sheikh Rasheed Ahmad Ex Federal Information Minister Pakistan
- Sheila Kaul (1915– ), former Indian governor and cabinet minister, social reformer, and educationist
- Sher Ahmed Khan, Guerrilla fighter and also served as the President of Azad Kashmir
- Syed Ali Shah Geelani (1929– ) Member Jamait-e-Islami, Founder and Chairman of Tehreek-e-Hurriyat J&K, Chairman All Parties Hurriyat Conference
- Syed Mir Qasim, Chief Minister of Jammu and Kashmir (1971–1975)
- Usman Dar, politician of PTI from Sialkote
- Vijaya Lakshmi Pandit (1900–1990) Indian diplomat and politician. Sister of Jawaharlal Nehru
- Zarah Sultana British Labour Party politician who and the Member of Parliament

== Royalty ==
- Alauddin Shah, 4th Sultan of Kashmir
- Ali Shah Chak, 21st Sultan of Kashmir
- Ali Shah Miri, 8th Sultan of Kashmir
- Avantivarman, King of Kashmir
- Didda, Ruler of Kashmir
- Durlabhaka-Pratapaditya II
- Ashoka,king of Gonanda dynasty
- Durlabhavardhana, founder of Karkota dynasty
- Fateh Shah Miri, 13th Sultan of Kashmir
- Ghazi Shah Chak, founder of Chak Dynasty, 19th Sultan of Kashmir
- Habba Khatoon, Queen Consort of Kashmir
- Haider Shah Miri, 10th Sultan of Kashmir
- Husain Shah Chak, 20th Sultan of Kashmir
- Jamshid Shah Miri, 3rd Sultan of Kashmir
- Kota Rani, was the last ruler of the Hindu Lohara dynasty
- Lalitaditya Muktapida, emperor of Kashmir (724–760)
- Lohar Khan, 24th Sultan of Kashmir
- Muhammad Shah Mir, 12th Sultan of Kashmir, had five separate reigns from 1484 to 1537
- Qutbu'd-Din Shah, 6th Sultan of Kashmir
- Sankaravarman, King of Kashmir
- Sayyid Mubarak, 23rd Sultan of Kashmir
- Shah Mir, founder of Shah Mir Dynasty
- Shihabu'd-Din Shah, 5th Sultan of Kashmir
- Sikandar Shah Miri, 7th Sultan of Kashmir
- Taj Khatoon, Empress consort as wife of Zayn al-Abidin the Great
- Virendra Mohan Dar, Jagirdar of Dar (Akhnoor) under the Durrani Empire
- Yakub Shah Chak, 25th Sultan of Kashmir
- Yousuf Shah Chak, 22nd Sultan of Kashmir
- Zayn al-Abidin the Great, 9th Sultan of Kashmir

== Saints, mystics and philosophers ==
- Baba Shadi Shaheed, a Sufi Saint
- Bhagwan Gopinath, a mystic and saint
- Bhai Almast, a Udasi mystic and saint
- Bhai Balu Hasna, a Udasi mystic and saint
- Bhatta Kallata, Shaivite scholar
- Habibullah Nowshehri, a Sufi poet, mystic, known by his pen name 'Hubbi'
- Hamza Makhdoom, a Sufi mystic, scholar and spiritual teacher
- Haneef ud-Din, Sufi of Rishi order
- Kashyapa, one of the Saptarishis
- Lal Ded, a Shaivite saint
- Lala Aragami, Sufi poet and spiritual teacher
- Mian Muhammad Bakhsh, a Sufi saint and poet
- Mirza Kamil Badakhshi, 17th-century Kashmiri Sufi Poet and writer of Turkic-Central Asian ancestry.
- Naseeb ud-Din, Sufi poet and writer of Suhrawardiyya order
- Rahim Sopori, Sufi saint and poet of Qadiriyyah order
- Resh Mir Sàeb, venerated saint of Rishi order
- Rupa Bhawani, a mystic and saint
- Samad Mir, Sufi poet
- Shamas Faqir, 19th-century Sufi poet, mystic of the Qadiriyya Sufi order
- Sheikh Noor-ud-din Wali, a Sufi saint who belonged to the Rishi order
- Somananda, Shaivite mystic and saint
- Swami Lakshman Joo, a scholar of Kashmir Shaivism
- Wahab Khar, Sufi poet and saint
- Yaqub Sarfi, a Muslim polymath

== Scholars and educationists ==
- Ahmad Hasan Dani (1920–2009), Pakistani intellectual, archaeologist, historian, and prolific linguist
- Aga Syed Yousuf, (1904–1982) was a Kashmiri religious scholar and leader of Shia Muslims. He founded the influential Anjuman-e-Sharie organization.
- Ali Mohammad Jan (1914–1988), popularly known as Dr. Ali Jan, was a Kashmiri physician renowned for his exceptional diagnostic skills and compassionate patient care.
- Balajinnatha Pandita (1916–2007), Sanskrit scholar, expert on Kashmir Shaivism
- Braj Kachru (1932– ), researcher in English linguistics
- Charaka medicinal science scholar
- Hakeem Ali Mohammad (1906–1987), Unani Medicine scholar, physician expert on Unani Medicine
- Ismat Beg mathematician, known for his work on Multiple-criteria decision analysis, and fixed point (mathematics).
- Jaishree Odin, post-modern literary theorist, professor of Interdisciplinary Studies at the University of Hawaii
- Kailas Nath Kaul (1905–1983), botanist, agricultural scientist, agronomist, and educationist
- Khalil Al-Qari (1939–2018), Sheikh of the Imams of the two holy Mosques, known for founding the modern Quranic renaissance and pioneering the Hijazi school in reciting the Quran
- Mohammad Yousuf Taing (b.1935), a researcher, scholar, critic, writer, politician and historian, also biographer of Sheikh Abdullah.
- Mulla Kabir Kashmiri, 15th-century scholar and rector of Zayn al-Abidin's Dar-ul-Ulum in Nowshera, Srinagar.
- Nyla Ali Khan, Professor, writer, granddaughter of Sheikh Abdullah.
- Nazir Ahmad Qasmi (1 June 1965 –), Grand Mufti of the Darul Uloom Raheemiyyah in Kashmir.
- Omkar N. Koul (1941–2019), researcher in linguistics, language education, communication, and comparative literature
- Patañjali, compiler of the Yoga Sūtras, a collection of aphorisms on Yoga practice
- Rahmatullah Mir Qasmi, Islamic scholar and founder of Darul Uloom Raheemiyyah
- Ravinder Kumar (1933–2001), historian
- Salman Rushdie - Fiction writer and academic
- Samsar Chand Kaul (1883–1977), teacher, author and ornithologist of Kashmir
- Sushruta medical science
- Vatesvara scholar of trigonometry
- Vijay Vaishnavi - Researcher and scholar in the computer information systems field

== Separatist leaders and militants ==
- Afzal Guru, convict in 2001 Delhi parliament attack
- Amanullah Khan (JKLF) co- founder of JKLF
- Ashfaq Majeed Wani
- Ashiq Hussain Faktoo, Pro-Pakistan militant leader
- Ashraf Sehrai Former Chairman of Hurrirat Conference
- Asiya Andrabi
- Burhan Wani, former commander and militant of Hizbul Mujahideen
- Farooq Ahmed Dar, former militant and current chairman of Jammu Kashmir Liberation Front
- Masarat Alam
- Maqbool Bhat, co-founder of Jammu Kashmir Liberation Front
- Mirwaiz Umar Farooq, Spiritual leaders of Kashmiri people and chairman of Hurriyat conference.
- Mukhtar Ahmed Waza, Executive Member of Hurriyat Conference
- Abdul Gani Lone, Kashmiri separatist leader.
- Mohammad Abbas Ansari, a Kashmiri separatist, ex-chairman of the All Parties Hurriyat Conference
- Muhammad Ahsan Dar, founder and ex Commander of Hizbul Mujahideen
- Syed Ali Shah Geelani
- Sayeed Salahudeen, the head of Hizb-ul-Mujahideen, pro-Pakistan Kashmiri separatist militant organisation operating in Kashmir.
- Yasin Malik, president of the Jammu Kashmir Liberation Front
- Zakir Rashid Bhat, commander of Ansar Ghazwat-ul-Hind

== Sportspeople ==
- Abid Nabi, (1985- ), once regarded as fastest bowler in India
- Amjad Khan, (21 August 1966) Kashmiri-born-American former cricketer.
- Aadil Manzoor Peer, International ice stock sport Athlete.
- Adil Rashid, English Cricketer
- Adil Nabi, Footballer
- Afaq Raheem, a first-class cricketer
- Aleem Dar, International cricket Umpire
- Amad Butt, Pakistani Cricketer
- Asif Dar, boxer
- Awais Zia, Pakistani Cricketer.
- Haroon Rasheed Dar (1953– ), former Pakistani cricketer.
- Ikram Butt first Muslim and South Asian to play rugby for England.
- Imran Arif Pakistani-born English first-class cricketer
- Imtiaz Abbasi Pakistani born Emirati international cricketer
- Inam Butt Wrestler, gold medalist for Pakistan at Commonwealth Games 2010 and 2018
- Iqra Rasool (2000-), cricketer
- Mehrajuddin Wadoo (1984– ), member of the India national football team and East Bengal FC
- Moeen Ali English Cricketer
- Munir Dar, Member of Pakistan National hockey Team
- Nauman Anwar Pakistani Cricketer
- Nida Dar, Pakistani cricketer
- Nooh Dastgir Butt, weightlifter, Gold medalist for Pakistan at Commonwealth Games 2022
- Parvez Rasool (1989 -) first Kashmiri cricketer to play for India national cricket team
- Salman Butt former Pakistan test captain
- Sana Mir (1986– ), female Pakistani cricketer and captain of the Pakistan women's team
- Sikandar Raza Pakistani-Zimbabwean Cricketer
- Suresh Raina, cricketer
- Tabarak Dar Pakistani-born cricketer who played for Hong Kong
- The Great Gama, wrestler
- Umran Malik Indian cricketer
- Usman Khawaja, Pakistani-Australian cricketer
- Usama Mir Pakistani cricketer
- Vivek Razdan (1967– ), member of the Indian Cricket Team
- Yahya Butt (1962–2022), Pakistani bodybuilder, 3 times Gold Medallist at Mr. Asia bodybuilding championship]

== Visual and performing artists ==
- Aamir Bashir, actor
- Abhay Sopori, Santoor player, composer & musician
- Abid Kashmiri, actor
- Aditya Dhar, director
- Ahad Raza Mir, Pakistani actor
- Ali Azmat, Musician
- Alia Bhatt, actress, singer, producer & entrepreneur
- Alla Rakha, actor
- Angira Dhar, actress
- Anupam Kher, actor
- Anwar Shemza (1928–1985) artist and writer in Pakistan, later in UK. Published Urdu novels, poetry and plays
- Asrar (musician), singer-songwriter
- Asif Raza Mir, Pakistani actor
- Bansi Kaul, theater director
- Bhajan Sopori, Santoor player
- D.K. Sapru (1916–1979), actor
- Emmad Irfani, model/actor
- Farhan Saeed, actor
- Ghulam Hassan Sofi (1932–2009) singer and harmonium player
- Ghulam Mohammad Saznawaz, proponent of Kashmiri SufiMusic
- Ghulam Nabi Sheikh, singer and composer
- Ghulam Rasool Santosh (1929–1997), painter
- Hina Khan, television & film actress
- Ilyas Kashmiri, actor
- Iqbal Kashmiri, film director
- Iqbal Khan, actor
- Katrina Kaif actress
- Kshmr Indian American DJ with Kashmiri ethnicity
- Khalid Abbas Dar, artist
- Khawaja Khurshid Anwar (1912–1984) filmmaker, writer, director and composer
- Kiran Kumar, actor
- Kunal Khemu, actor
- Leenesh Mattoo, actor
- Malika Pukhraj (1912–2004), highly popular Ghazal and folk singer in Pakistan
- Mani Kaul (1950–2011), Film Maker
- Manohar Kaul, painter
- MC Kash Kashmiri hip hop artist
- Mekaal Hasan, Pakistani musician and record producer
- Mir Sarwar, Bollywood actor
- Mohit Raina, actor
- Mohit Suri, film director
- Moonis Shah, visual artist
- Muhammad Younis Butt Pakistani screenwriter
- Muneeb Butt, Pakistani actor
- Mushtaq Kak (1961– ), theatre director
- Omkar Nath Dhar (Jeevan), actor
- Jaan Nissar Lone, Bollywood Composer, director & singer
- Osman Khalid Butt, actor
- Pran Kishore, Kashmiri drama writer
- Priya Raina, actor, singer, voice artist
- Priti Sapru, actor
- Pushkar Bhan, Padamashree, a radio actor & drama writer
- Qazi Touqeer (1985– ), singer in Kashmiri and Hindi languages
- Raj Begum, singer
- Raj Zutshi, Bollywood & TV Actor
- Ratan Parimoo (1936– ), art historian and painter
- Reyhna Malhotra, actress
- Samina Peerzada, Pakistani television and film actress, director
- Sandeepa Dhar, actor
- Sanjay Suri, actor
- Śārṅgadeva 13th century, Musicologist, also known as Father of Indian Music
- Shaheer Sheikh, actor from Bhaderwah, Doda District of J&K
- Soni Razdan TV actor and director
- Shadi Lal Koul (1954–2020), Kashmiri actor
- Vibha Saraf Singer

== Journalists ==
- Aamir Peerzada, award-winning journalist and documentary filmmaker.
- Aarti Tikoo Singh, assistant editor in The Times of India, conflict and international affairs writer and former reporter
- Altaf Qadri, Photojournalist working with the Associated Press
- Gharida Farooqi, television host and anchorperson.
- Hamid Mir, award-winning journalist, columnist and an author.
- Kamran Yousuf, Freelance Kashmiri photojournalist
- Nidhi Razdan, award-winning television journalist.
- Qazi Shibli, journalist and editor of The Kashmiryat.
- Masrat Zahra, freelance Kashmiri photojournalist.
- Rahul Pandita, Kashmiri author and journalist.
- Sajjad Haider, journalist and editor of Kashmir Observer.
- Shujaat Bukhari (25 February 1968 – 14 June 2018), veteran Kashmiri journalist and the founding editor of Rising Kashmir
- Yusuf Jameel Veteran Kashmiri journalist known for his coverage of Kashmir conflict.

== Other ==
- Atiqullah Shah, acting Mirwaiz during 1950s, former President of Anjuman Nusrat-ul-Islam
- Faizan Arif, J&K's first recognized independent weatherman, columnist, and founder of Kashmir Weather.
- Ghulam Rasool Khan (born 1955), artisan, master craftsman

== See also ==
- List of people from Jammu and Kashmir
