= List of people from Jammu and Kashmir =

List of Some famous personalities from Jammu and Kashmir

This is the list of notable people from Jammu and Kashmir.

== Academics, science and technology ==
- G. M. Bhat, geologist and professor
- Tirath Das Dogra former director, AIIMS, New Delhi, 2007-9, Forensic expert
- Ved Kumari Ghai, Padma Shri and Nari Shakti Puraskar recipient, Sanskrit Scholar and social worker
- Lalit Gupta, art historian
- Subhash Kak, American computer scientist
- Vijay Mahajan, American marketing professor from Jammu
- Amitabh Mattoo, thinker and professor
- Anusha Shah, civil engineer
- Vishwamurti Shastri, Sanskrit scholar
- Sudhir Kumar Sopory former Vice Chancellor JNU Delhi
- Sonam Wangchuk, engineer, innovator and education reformist

== Administration and police ==
- Masud Choudhary, ex IPS officer
- Shah Faesal, first IAS topper from Kashmir
- V. N. Kaul, Comptroller and Auditor General of India, Padma Bhushan
- Abdul Rashid Khan, IPS, Ex Inspector General of Police and Member State Human Rights Commission.
- Farooq Khan, ex IPS, politician, advisor
- Kewal Kumar Sharma, ex IAS officer and advisor to Governor
- Shesh Paul Vaid, IPS officer

== Visual artists ==
- Ghulam Rasool Santosh, painter
- Dina Nath Walli, painter

== Musicians ==
- MC Kash, rapper
- KRSNA, rapper and actor
- Kshmr, electronic dance music artist
- Baabarr Mudacer, rapper
- Malika Pukhraj, singer
- Alla Rakha, musician
- Vibha Saraf, singer
- Shivkumar Sharma, musician
- Bhajan Sopori, musician

== Medicine ==
Hakeem Ali Mohammad Unani Physician.

== Defence forces ==
- Ajay Singh Jasrotia, Sena Medal recipient, Kargil War
- Chewang Rinchen, double MVC recipient
- Bana Singh, PVC recipient
- General Bikram Singh, ex Chief of Army Staff
- Rajinder Singh, first MVC recipient
- Nirmal Chander Vij, ex Chief of Army Staff
- Nazir Ahmad Wani, Ashoka Chakra recipient

== Film, stage and television people ==
- Anjali Abrol, film actress
- Raj Singh Arora, television actor
- Aamir Bashir, actor
- Praneet Bhat, actor
- Rahul Bhat, actor
- Vidhu Vinod Chopra
- Aditya Dhar, film director and lyricist
- Sandeepa Dhar, actress
- Zain Khan Durrani actor, poet
- Sana Dua, model
- Aly Goni, television actor
- Sidhant Gupta, actor
- Vidyut Jamwal, actor
- Jeevan, actor
- Mushtaq Kak, actor and theatre director
- Sanjay Kak, documentary filmmaker
- Siddharth Kak, television producer and presenter
- Ekta Kaul, television actress
- Kanchi Kaul, actress
- Sumit Kaul, actor
- Hina Khan, television actress
- Mohammed Iqbal Khan, actor
- Mushtaq Khan actor, writer, producer
- Kunal Khemu, actor
- Anupam Kher, actor
- Kiran Kumar, actor
- Raaj Kumar, film actor
- Reyhna Malhotra, television actress
- Leenesh Mattoo, television actor
- Wasim Mushtaq, television actor
- Om Prakash, character actor
- Abrar Qazi, actor
- K. K. Raina, actor, director
- M. K. Raina, actor, theatre director
- Mohit Raina, actor
- RJ Rafiq Radio Jockey, EMCEE, Actor
- Priya Raina, actor, singer, voice artist
- Mukesh Rishi, actor
- Vineet Raina, actor
- K. L. Saigal, singer and actor
- Tej Sapru, actor
- Mir Sarwar, actor, former model
- Loveleen Kaur Sasan, television serial actress
- Mir Sarwar, actor
- Nitin Sharma, model
- Shaheer Sheikh, television actor
- Sunder, actor
- Sanjay Suri, actor
- Qazi Touqeer, singer
- Zaira Wasim, former film actress
- Rajendranath Zutshi, film actor

== Journalism and media ==
- Shujaat Bukhari
- Sajjad Haider, journalist and editor of the Kashmir Observer
- Yusuf Jameel, veteran Kashmiri journalist, known for his coverage of Kashmir conflict
- Altaf Qadri, photojournalist working with the Associated Press
- Nidhi Razdan, newscaster
- Qazi Shibli, journalist and editor of The Kashmiryat
- Asif Sultan, journalist and editor in chief of the Kashmir Narrator
- Kamran Yousuf, photojournalist
- Masrat Zahra, freelance photojournalist

== Law and justice ==
- Adarsh Sein Anand, ex Chief Justice of India
- Parvez Imroz, human rights activist and lawyer
- Mehr Chand Mahajan, ex Chief Justice of India
- Bilal Nazki, ex Chief Justice of Orissa and Chairman of Human Rights Commission of Bihar
- T. S. Thakur, ex Chief Justice of India

== Literature ==
- Javaid Rahi Researcher, poet and critic
- Agha Shahid Ali, poet and finalist for National Book Award of United States in 2001
- Rafiq Anjum, poet, researcher, poet og Gojri and Urdu
- Rehman Rahi Kashmiri poet, and critic
- Bashir Bhadarwahi, writer, educationist, poet
- Moti Lal Kemmu, Kashmiri writer and social worker
- Habba Khatun, 16th-century poet, known as "Nightingale of Kashmir"
- Lalleshwari, poet-saint
- Hakeem Manzoor, writer, poet
- Farooq Nazki, poet, broadcaster and media personality
- Basharat Peer, author and scriptwriter
- Padma Sachdev, poet, novelist, first modern women poet of Dogri language
- Ali Mohammad Shahbaz, writer, poet
- Deen Bandhu Sharma, writer
- Nilamber Dev Sharma, first publication in English about Dogri literature
- Ram Nath Shastri, known as "Father of Dogri" as he brought Dogri language at national level, Dogri poet
- Jitendra Udhampuri, writer

== Politics ==
- Farooq Abdullah, former Chief Minister of Jammu and Kashmir
- Omar Abdullah, current Chief Minister of Jammu and Kashmir
- Sheikh Abdullah, former Chief Minister of Jammu and Kashmir.
- Ghulam Nabi Azad, former Chief Minister of Jammu and Kashmir
- Mirza Afzal Beg (d.1982) was the first Deputy Chief Minister of Jammu and Kashmir
- Surinder Kumar Choudhary, is the Current and first Deputy Chief Minister of Jammu and Kashmir UT
- Mirza Mehboob Beg (1949-), politician. He is Former Member of Parliament from Anantnag
- Altaf Bukhari, former Finance Minister of Jammu and Kashmir
- Abdul Rashid Dar Chairman of J&K Legislative Council and MLA, MLC
- Prem Nath Dogra, founder of Praja Parishad Party
- Shah Faesal, Independent politician, founder of Jammu and Kashmir Peoples Movement.
- Peer Mohammed Hussain, former Minister of State and co founder of Jammu and Kashmir Peoples Democratic Party
- Sakina Itoo, former Social Welfare And Tourism Minister of Jammu and Kashmir
- Wali Mohammad Itoo, former Speaker of J&K Legislative Assembly
- Mohammad Aslam Kohli, political leader
- Aga Syed Ruhullah Mehdi, Member Parliament Sringar, Ex Minster of JK legislative assembly, Ex MLA Budgam
- Bakshi Ghulam Mohammad, former Prime Minister of Jammu and Kashmir
- Mehbooba Mufti, former Chief Minister of Jammu and Kashmir
- Syed Mir Qasim, former Chief Minister of Jammu and Kashmir
- G. M. Saroori, former MLA
- Mufti Mohammad Sayeed, former Chief Minister of Jammu and Kashmir. and former Home Minister of India
- Sunil Sharma, former MLA
- Karan Singh, ex Sadar-e-Raiyasat
- Firdous Tak, former MLC

== Religion ==
- Banda Singh Bahadur
- Alhaj Ghulam Qadir Ganipuri
- Rahmatullah Mir Qasmi
- Showkat Ahmed Shah
- Mohammad Anwar Shopiani
- Faizul Waheed

== Royalty ==
- Zayn al-Abidin the Great, Sultan
- Ghazi Shah Chak, Sultan
- Yousuf Shah Chak, Sultan
- Habba Khatoon, Queen Consort
- Shah Mir, Sultan
- Sikandar Shah Miri, Sultan
- Gulab Singh, Maharaja
- Virendra Mohan Dar, Maharaja
- Hari Singh, Maharaja
- Karan Singh, Maharaja
- Pratap Singh, Maharaja
- Ranbir Singh, Maharaja

== Social activists ==
- Parveena Ahanger, cofounder and chairman of the Association of Parents of Disappeared Persons (APDP)
- Mushtaq Pahalgami, social activist, environmentalist

== Sports ==
- Ishfaq Ahmed, Indian football team
- Danish Farooq Bhat, Indian footballer plays as midfielder for real Kashmir team
- Manzoor Dar, Indian cricketer
- Gul Dev, Winter Olympian
- Nadeem Iqbal, Winter Olympian
- Ranveer Jamwal, mountaineer, climbed Everest 3 times, has climbed the highest peaks of all 7 continents
- Shubham Khajuria, cricketer
- Arif Khan, Winter Olympian
- Umran Malik, J&K cricketer, played IPL through Sunrisers Hyderabad
- Mithun Manhas, Indian Premier League player
- Aadil Manzoor Peer, international ice stock sport athlete, web developer
- Samay Raina, chess player, YouTuber, streamer
- Iqra Rasool, Indian cricketer
- Parvez Rasool, first J&K cricketer to represent India in International cricket
- Rasikh Salam, Indian Premier League player
- Abdul Samad, J&K cricketer, played IPL through Sunrisers Hyderabad
- Mohammad Sarfaraz, international ice stock sport athlete
- Chain Singh, J&K's first Olympian, Asian Games 2014 Bronze Medal winner in shooting
- Mehrajuddin Wadoo, Indian Football team

== Other ==
- Faizan Arif, J&K's first recognized independent weatherman, columnist, and founder of Kashmir Weather.

== See also ==
- List of Kashmiri people
- List of Indians by state
