= Pandita =

Paṇḍita (Hindi: paṇḍit; Malaysian and Indonesian Malay: pendeta; Mongol: bandida; Javanese: pandhita, pêndhita, pêndheta, (pandito, pendito, pendeto); Tibetan: khepa; Wyl: mkhas pa), a Sanskrit word meaning learned master, may refer to:

== Titles ==
- Pandita (Buddhism), a Buddhist teacher skilled in five sciences
  - Agga Maha Pandita, an honorific title used in Theravada Buddhism
- Pandit, the Hindi variant, a broad term for teacher in the ancient and contemporary Indian context
- Pandita (Islam), a term for Muslim ritual specialists in the Philippines and classic Indonesia
- The Reverend, a title that translates as pendeta in Indonesian

== People ==
- Balajinnatha Pandita (1916–2007), Sanskrit scholar
- Gadadhara Pandita, an associate of Hindu social reformer Chaitanya Mahaprabhu
- Lakshmana Pandita, 15th century Indian medical author
- Pandita Ramabai (1858–1922), Indian social reformer
- Sakya Pandita (1182–1251), 13th-century Tibetan Buddhist scholar
- Sayadaw U Pandita (1921–2016), Burmese Theravada master
- Zaya Pandita (1599–1662), Buddhist missionary priest and the most prominent Oirat Buddhist scholar

== Other uses ==
- Pandita (butterfly), a brush-footed butterfly of tribe Limenitidini

== See also ==
- Pandit (disambiguation)
