= Mushtaq Pahalgami =

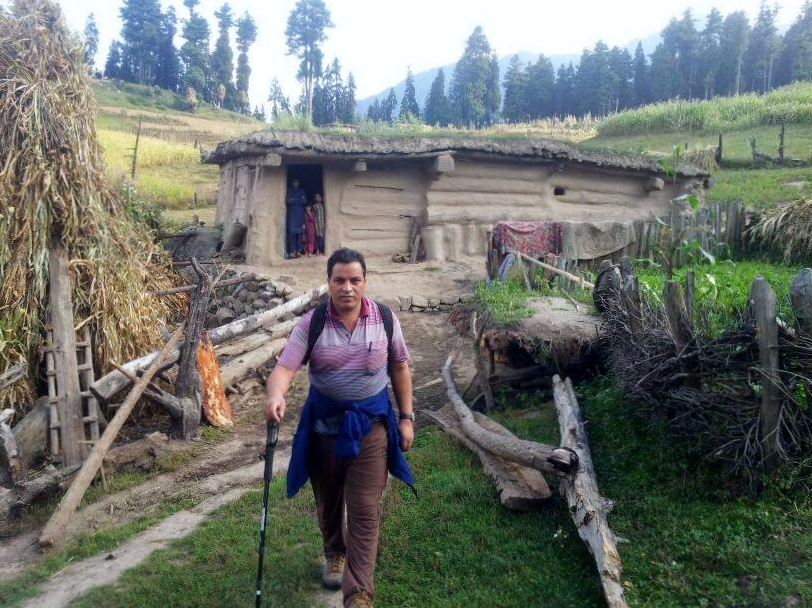
- Born: 1 March 1979 (age 47); Pahalgam, J&K
- Known for: J&K, Right to Information, 2009 Right to Public Services legislation, J&K, PSGA, 2011 Environmentalism
- Parent(s): Taja Begum (mother); Mohammad Jabar Magrey (father)

Mushtaq Ahmad Magrey, also known as Mushtaq Pahalgami (born 1979), is a social activist, environmentalist and president of Himalayan Welfare Organization. He hails from Pahalgam town of Anantnag of Jammu and Kashmir. He has been honoured with several national awards by various authorities, including the Ministry of Tourism working for the cause of education, public health and environmental conservation in Pahalgam, Kashmir. He is also one of the earliest promoters of 'green-trek' in the region with the purpose of inculcating environmental social responsibility & a sense of moral social duty among the youth, and has been raising his voice against the encroachment of wildlife areas by influential people in Pahalgam.

== Career ==
Mushtaq Pahalgami has worked closely with many other environmental and social activists in the region. Pahalgami is founder and president of the NGO Himalayan Welfare Organization, Pahalgam (HWO), committed to service in the areas of health care, environmental protection and conservation, tourism, education, poverty reduction and alleviation human rights, and preservation of the famous Kolahoi Glacier, Lidder and Sind Rivers.

Pahalgami also works with trade unions and social organizations like President at Pahalgam Hotel and Guest House Association, Pahalgam Travel and Tour Operators Union, Pahalgam Tent Union, and Adventure Tour Operators Association Pahalgam . He and his team at HWO are known in the region for organizing free medical camps, educational conferences, environment preservation and awareness programmes, seminars and symposiums about the right to Information public education and health care, drug deaddiction, animal rights, sanitation and hygiene apart from ongoing flood relief operations after the recent floods in the valley.

Pahalgami has campaigned for environmental conservation in the Himalayan region, particularly in and around Pahalgam, compelling exploitative forest, timber and land interests to retreat from most parts of the region through a long and sustained legal battle and RTI crusade against illegal occupation of forest land, hunting of wild animals, felling of trees and smuggling of timber. HWO has also organised over 100 hundreds of camps and information campaigns to promote and ensure conservation of the natural ecosystems of the Lidder and Sind rivers as well as the Kolhoi Glacier.

== Social Campaigns ==
Pahalgami and his team at the HWO have filed hundreds of Right to Information Act RTI and Public Service Guarantee Act PSGA applications and cases, particularly concerning land grabbing, illegal construction and illegal land-use in and around Pahalgam; ensuring implementation of the 2008 J&K High-court order staying all construction and repair in the region. This has resulted in positive interventions and more than two hundred notices served in various cases, to the Department of Social Welfare, Ministry of Tourism, Department of Education, Department of Consumer Affairs, Department of Public Distribution, rural Development, Ministry of Environment, Forest Department, Integrated Child development project; GOI, and State Assembly Secretariat, among others.

Mushtaq Pahalgami's sustained efforts at inculcating a culture of rational critique and inquiry among the youth, have also strengthened the citizens' movement in the region. His persistent efforts in questioning the state-machinery's inefficacy has given much-needed impetus to the state's anti-corruption movement.

Pahalgami has been pursuing the welfare of his local environment in his capacities and has been vocal about the encroachment of forests by hotels & resorts and the rising pressure on wildlife, sometimes bearing physical assault for his intentions, yet organising clean-up treks against the use of plastic in his village. He has been pro-active in guiding the public attention towards a sustainable maintenance of the tourist spots in the area, and has raised the issues pertaining to the upkeep of tourists sites, like the inconvenience caused by the defunct street lights to tourists in night hours, unsettling of debris caused by burning of 3 buildings since 7 years, negligence towards significant water leakages in the area, etc.

== See also ==
- Attacks on RTI activists in India
- Jammu and Kashmir Right to Information Act, 2009
- List of Kashmiri People
- List of people from Jammu and Kashmir
- Right of Children to Free and Compulsory Education Act
- United Nations Environment Organization
