= Pandit (disambiguation) =

Pandit or pundit is a scholar or expert, especially of traditional Indian law, philosophy, or music.

Pandit or pundit may also refer to:

- Jawaharlal Nehru, India's first and longest-serving prime minister
- Pundit (explorer), a 19th-century term to denote native surveyors who explored regions to the north of India for the British Empire
- Pundit, an expert or opinion-leader who analyzes events in an area of expertise in the popular media
- Pandit (surname), Indian surname
- PANDIT (database), a biological database covering protein domains
- Inspector Pandit, a fictional police officer in the 2003 Indian film Maqbool, based on one of the Weird Sisters in Macbeth

== See also ==
- Kashmiri Pandits, a Hindu population in Kashmir, India
- Pandita (disambiguation)
- Pantulu (disambiguation), an Indian name, variant of Pandit
