= Sonali Gupta =

Indian anthropological archaeologist

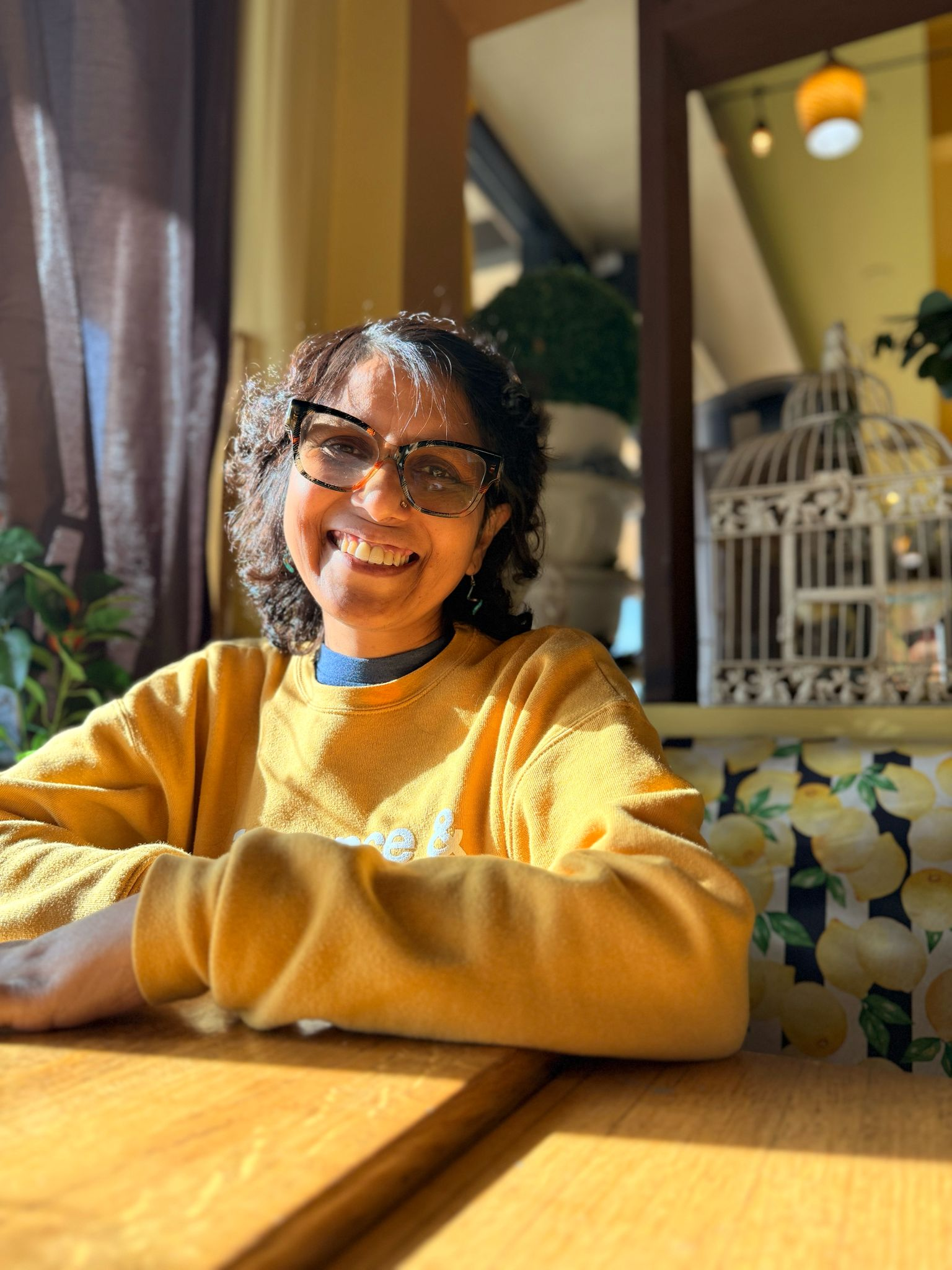
- Born: 5 May 1975 (age 51)
- Education: PhD from University of California, Los Angeles; M.A. in Archaeology from University of California, Los Angeles; LL.B. from Faculty of Law, Delhi University; M.A. History from Department of History, Delhi University; B.A. (Hons) History from Hansarj College, Delhi University
- Occupations: Anthropological archaeologist, Egyptologist, lawyer, cultural conservationist
- Known for: Founder-director of the Himalayan Institute of Cultural and Heritage Studies (India) and the Himalayan Conservation and Preservation Society (United States)
- Website: https://hichs.org/ https://hcpsusa.org/

Sonali Gupta (born 5 May 1975), also known as Sonali Gupta-Agarwal, is an Indian anthropological archaeologist, Egyptologist, and lawyer. She is noted for her efforts in creating knowledge and dialogue around the cultural, historical, and natural heritage of the Himalayas. She is the founder-director of the Himalayan Institute of Cultural and Heritage Studies.

== Personal life ==
Gupta's mother belonged to Sirmaur (Himachal Pradesh) and father to Jammu and Kashmir. Her father was a diplomat in the Indian Foreign Service. She is married and is a cancer survivor.

== Education ==
Gupta obtained a BA (Hons) in History from Hansraj College, Delhi University; an MA in History from the Department of History, Delhi University, and an LL.B. from the Faculty of Law, Delhi University. Later, she earned an MA in Archaeology from the University of California, Los Angeles (UCLA), and then a PhD (2015) from the Cotsen Institute of Archeology at UCLA, specialising in Egyptian archaeology.

== Legal and academic career ==
Gupta practiced as a criminal lawyer in India for four years and then worked at the Los Angeles District Attorney’s office.

She taught at UCLA for eight years.

In 2011-12, she was awarded the Lewis and Clark Fund for Exploration and Field Research by the American Philosophical Society for her research in Upper Egypt.

At UCLA, after her PhD, she was awarded the Dean's Lecturership in Social Research, following which she was appointed as Director of Public Research at the Cotsen Institute.

Additionally, Gupta was a visiting professor at the National Museum Institute, New Delhi.

== Himalayan Institute for Cultural and Heritage Studies ==
Gupta founded the Himalayan Institute for Cultural and Heritage Studies (HICHS) in Kullu in 2020, which she shifted to Dhami near Shimla in 2022. The goal of this non-profit organisation is to develop a knowledge hub dedicated to Himalayan studies, in research, scholarship, and art. HICHS conducts field schools in archaeological and anthropological methods in the Kullu valley and other parts of Himachal Pradesh. The organisation also offers online courses on themes such as 'Tantra in the Western Himalayas', 'Building memory through landscape and architecture', and 'Understanding crisis, conservation, and Anthropocene in the Western Himalayas'. In addition, HICHS periodically also hosts online talks on Zoom by Himalaya-focused scholars and artists from many fields. By January 2025, HICHS had conducted seven field schools and over 225 online talks, the recordings of which are available for free on Youtube. Among others, the talks include ones by Raaja Bhasin, William Sax, Ed Douglas, Ian Baker, Kevin Bubriski, Manju Kak, Anjali Kapila, and Siddharth Pandey.

From time to time, HICHS has also organised events on Himalayan cultural heritage and conservation in collaboration with local colleges in Himachal Pradesh, as well as for sale of gift items made from environmentally-friendly techniques and recycled products.

== Other works ==
- In the United States, Gupta is also the founder-director of the Himalayan Conservation and Preservation Society (HCPS), which seeks to fund and collaborate with HICHS in its Himalayan projects.
- In 2012, Gupta was the ethnoarchaeology consultant for an ethnoarchaeological survey conducted by the Kerala Historical Research Council in collaboration with the British Museum. The theme was the pottery traditions of the Pattanam region in Kerala, India.
- In 2017, Gupta and Sonam Spalzin from the Archaeological Survey of India organized a day-long seminar in Leh, Ladakh, in honour of the German author and photographer Peter van Ham, for his three decades of research and contributions on the Western Himalayas.
- In the early 2020s, Gupta was the cultural resource specialist for the City of Santa Monica's Airport Conversion Project. Her work included research and landmark nominations of several sites, including 1925 Broadway, Palisades Park, Topanga State Park, and Zephyr Dogtown Boys Project.
- She serves as a consultant to Communitology, a US-based women-owned consulting firm.
- Gupta has also provided expert opinion on women, architecture, and water utilisation in the Western Himalayas.
- Gupta has written several feature articles for The Tribune on Himalayan religions and cultural histories.

== Bibliography ==
- Gupta, Sonali. “Pottery from Kamrej Excavations”: Journal of Indian Ocean Archaeology 1 (2004): 34-66.
- Gupta, Sonali, Rohini Pandey. "Iron working in and around Kamrej”. Journal of Indian Ocean Archaeology 1 (2004): 88-92
- Garge, Tejas, Anuja Geetali, S.P. Gupta, Sonali Gupta. “Antiquities from Kamrej Excavations-2003". Journal of Indian Ocean Archaeology 1 (2004): 67-77.
- Gupta, Swaraj P., Sunil Gupta, Tejas Garge, Rohini Pandey, Anuja Geetali, and Sonali Gupta. "On the fast track of the Periplus: Excavations at Kamrej, 2003." Journal of Indian Ocean Archaeology 1 (2004): 9-33.
- Gupta-Agarwal, Sonali. "The final curtain call: the abandonment of Karanis in light of Late Roman amphorae." Coptica 11 (2011): 61-76.
- Gupta-agarwal, Sonali. "Cultural Transmission and consumer demand: a case study using ceramics from Karanis, Egypt". In Natalia Poulou-Papadimitriou, Eleni Nodarou and Vassilis Kilikoglou (eds.) Late Roman Coarse Wares, Cooking Wares and Amphorae in the Mediterranean. Archaeology and archaeometry. The Mediterranean: a market without frontiers. British Archaeological Reports (BAR) S2616, 2014. ISBN 9781407312514.
- Gupta-Agarwal, Sonali. Understanding transmission of skill as influencing continuity or change through locally manufactured utilitarian ware at Greco Roman Karanis. University of California, Los Angeles, 2015.
