= Pandit (surname) =

Pandit or Pandith is an Indian and Nepalese Brahmin surname.

== Usage ==
When prefixed to a name, it denotes a scholar, for example, Pandita Ramabai or Pandit Nehru. A Hindu priest is also respectfully called Pandit ji.

== Film ==
- Anand Pandit, Indian film producer
- Ashoke Pandit (born 1966), Indian filmmaker and social activist
- Chetan Pandit, Bollywood actor
- Gaurie Pandit Dwivedi (born 1982), Indian actress
- Jatin Pandit, Bollywood film composer
- Kalpana Pandit (born 1967), Indian film actress, model, and emergency physician
- Radhika Pandit (born 1984), Indian actress
- Ridhima Pandit (born 1990), Indian actress and model
- Santhosh Pandit (born 1973), Malayalam film actor, singer
- Shiv Panditt (born 1984), Indian actor
- Shraddha Pandit (born 1982), Indian playback singer
- Shweta Pandit (born 1986), Indian actress and singer
- Sulakshana Pandit (1954–2025), Indian actress and singer
- Surbir Pandit, Nepalese actor
- Tejaswini Pandit (born 1990), Indian actress
- Vijayta Pandit (born 1967), Indian actress
- Yash Pandit (born 1981), Bollywood actor

== Sports ==
- Arjun Pandit (athlete) (born 1959), Nepalese marathon runner
- Chandrakant Pandit (born 1961), Indian cricketer
- Krishna Pandit (born 1998), Indian footballer
- Nitin Pandit (born 1975), Indian cricketer
- Ravinder Pandit (born 1959), Indian cricketer
- Rohan Pandit (born 1981), Indian cricketer
- Ronak Pandit (born 1985), Indian shooter
- Shobha Pandit (born 1956), Indian cricketer

== Other ==
- Agam Manohar Pandit (born 1981), Indian cricketer and entrepreneur
- Balraj Pandit, Indian playwright in Hindi and Punjabi
- Bansi Pandit (born 1942), Indian writer and speaker on Hinduism
- Devaki Pandit (born 1965), Indian playback singer
- Farah Pandith (born 1968), American academic
- Korla Pandit (1921–1998), American musician, composer and TV personality
- Lal Babu Pandit, Nepalese politician
- M. P. Pandit (1918–1993), Indian spiritualist, teacher and Sanskrit scholar
- Nin Pandit, British civil servant
- Rahul Pandit (born 1956), Indian physicist
- Rajani Pandit (born 1962), Indian private investigator
- Sarat Chandra Pandit (1879–1968), commonly known as 'Dada Thakur' — Indian columnist and satirist
- Vijaya Lakshmi Pandit (1900–1990), Indian diplomat and politician
- Vikram Pandit (born 1957), Indian-American banker
- Yadav Pandit, Nepalese research scholar

== See also ==
- Pandita (disambiguation)
- Bhat

== Sources ==
- Brower, Barbara; Johnston, Barbara Rose (2016). Disappearing Peoples?: Indigenous Groups and Ethnic Minorities in South and Central Asia. Routledge. ISBN 9781315430393.
