= Pantulu =

Pantulu (lit. 'pandit') means Guru in the South Indian language Telugu, and may refer to:

- Tanguturi Prakasam Pantulu (1872–1957), Indian politician and Freedom Fighter and the first Chief Minister of Andhra Pradesh
- Kasinadhuni Nageswara Rao (died 1938), better known as Nageswara Rao Pantulu, Indian journalist, nationalist and politician
- Gidugu Venkata Ramamurthy (1863-1940), better known as 'Gidugu Ramamurthy Pantulu', Telugu writer and linguist
- Nyapati Subba Rao Pantulu (1856–1941), Indian politician and social activist
- Kandukuri Veeresalingam Pantulu (1848–1919), Indian social reformer and writer

== See also ==
- Pandit (disambiguation)
