= Zareef Ahmad Zareef =

Indian Kashmiri writer

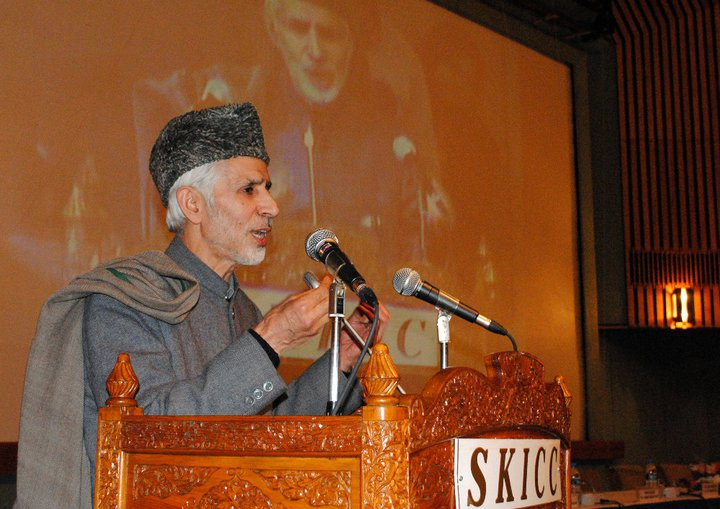
Zareef Ahmad Zareef

Zareef Ahmad Zareef (born 17 April 1943) is a Kashmiri poet, writer, social activist and environmentalist. He is best known for his satirical poetry and efforts to highlight various social and political problems. He is involved in the preservation of the environment, culture and heritage of Kashmir.

== Early life and education ==
Zareef Ahmed Zareef was born as Zareef Ahmed Shah in 1943, in the downtown city of Srinagar (Aali Kadal) to Ghulam Mohi-ud-Din. His father owned an embroidery workshop, in a locality that was also a hub for Hakims, Sufis, poets, traders, and merchants. As a child, Zareef held the Sufi saint Khawja Habibullah Ataar in great esteem, and still visits his mausoleum regularly to pay obeisance. Zareef received his education from Islamia High School, Rajouri Kadal. He was an enthusiast and a regular face in seminars, symposiums, debates, and annual events throughout his formative years. He received guidance from his teachers and noted writer - especially Sattar Shahid - and eventually found himself uttering lines expressing personal feelings and thoughts on stage. He soon developed the ambition to become a poet.

== Influence ==
As stated by Zareef numerous times, it was Ghulam Ahmed Mir Abid, a lesser known writer was the one who showed Zareef how to use his own imaginative powers and fine-tuned his writing aptitude. Hakeem Manzoor, an eminent Urdu writer, introduced Zareef to the great beauty of verse and the profoundness of literature.

== Career ==
=== Government Service ===
In 1968, Zareef was appointed as a scriptwriter in the Department of Information. While serving in the cultural unit of the Department of Information he remained active in organizing public shows, dramas, mushairas and features. He retired from the department as an assistant cultural officer.

=== Writing ===
After retirement, Zareef started his life as a poet, with Kashmiri being the medium. Much of the poetry portrays social evils, and Zareef aims to raise public awareness in order to address these issues. Imbalances in society, the plight of the weaker sections, and environmental filth have been some main themes of his writing.

== Published works ==
Zareef has authored six (6) books:

- Khabar Togme Wanun, 2007 (a compilation of essays reflecting eclectic issues and problems of our society)
- Taaran Garee, 2012 (a compilation of satirical poems)
- Kath cha Taeti, 2014 (a compilation of social, political, and cultural essays)
- T'choenche poot, 2016 (a compilation of poems and prose for kids)
- Buzeiy ne kaensi zaeree, 2019 (a compilation of satirical poems)
- Jyoi roazi pakaan, 2023 (a collection of research essays)

== Other activities ==
After retirement from government service, Zareef's services have been utilized in numerous public, social, and literary fields. He has been selected/chosen as:

- Chairman, Ahad Zargar Memorial Research Foundation, Kashmir.
- Chairman, Valley Citizens Council, Kashmir (an organization looking after the common problems of the people).
- Writer and Member, Rajeev Gandhi Foundation, Kashmir Syllabus Committee.

== Awards and appreciation ==
- Zareef has been awarded and appreciated for his works in different social, cultural, environmental and literary fields by various associations and organizations:
- Sahitya Academy Award, for his book "T'choenche poot"
- Ahad Zargar Memorial Award in 2010, for prominent works in the literary field.
- He was also given the Green Citizen Award in 2011 by Rahim Greens (a member of the International Association for voluntary effort) for his contribution to protecting the environment of Kashmir.
