= Santosh =

Santosh (Sanskrit: संतोष), also spelled as Santhosh, is a given name in India and Nepal, usually masculine, sometimes feminine. The name means "Satisfaction" or "Happiness".

== Notable people with the given name Santosh, male ==
- Santosh Bagrodia, former MP, politician representing INC
- Santosh Anand, Sealing Expert and Researcher
- Santosh Bhattacharyya (1924–2011), Bengali scholar
- Santosh Chandra Bhattacharyya (1915–1971), lecturer
- Santosh Dutta, Bengali actor
- Santhosh Echikkanam, contemporary short story writer from Kerala
- Santosh Gangwar (born 1948), Indian politician representing BJP, former MP
- Santhosh George Kulangara (born 1971), cinematographer and travel writer
- Santhosh Jogi (died 2010), Malayalam film actor and singer
- Santosh Joshi (born 1960), classical vocalist and instrumentalist
- Santosh Juvekar, Marathi film, television and stage actor
- Santosh Kashyap (born 1966), football coach
- Santosh Kumar (1925–1982), name by which the Pakistani film actor Syed Musa Raza was popularly known as
- Santosh Kumar Ghosh (1920–1985), Bengali writer and journalist
- Santosh Kumar Gupta (1936–1991), former Indian Navy admiral, recipient of Maha Vir Chakra
- Santosh Kumar Shukla, social worker, represented INC
- Santosh Lad (born 1975), politician representing INC, MLA from Karnataka
- Santosh Madhavan (born 1960), Godman from Kerala serving prison sentence for crimes committed
- Santosh Marray, Assistant Bishop of the Episcopal Diocese of Alabama
- Santosh Mohan Dev (born 1934), political leader, represents INC, former MPs
- Santhosh Narayanan (born 1983), Tamil film composer and musician
- Santhosh Pandit, Malayalam film actor
- Santosh Rana, politician, general secretary of Provisional Central Committee, CPI (ML), and former MLA
- Santosh Rana (CPI), politician representing CPI, former MLA
- Santosh Sahukhala (born 1988), Nepali international football player
- Santosh Saroj, Bollywood screenwriter
- Santosh Shah, Masterchef contestant
- Santosh Sivan (born 1964), cinematographer and film director from Kerala
- Santosh Srinivas, film director
- Santosh Thundiyil, cinematographer from Kerala
- Santosh Vempala (born 1971), computer scientist
- Anop Santosh (born 1991), Pakistani cricket player
- D. Santosh (born 1976), film and theatre actor from Mumbai
- Ghulam Rasool Santosh (1929–1997), Kashmiri painter
- Kolli Santosh Ravindranath (born 1983), screenwriter and director of Telugu and Kannada films
- N. Santosh Hegde (born 1940), Indian jurist, former Supreme Court justice
- Sanigaram Santosh Reddy (born 1942), political leader, former MLA
- T. V. Santhosh (born 1968), artist
- V. Santhosh Kumar (born 1991), amateur boxer

== Notable people with the given name Santosh, female ==
- Santosh Chowdhary (born 1944), member of Lok Sabha, politician representing INC
- Arunadhati Santosh Ghosh (born 1960), former cricketer
- Santosh Yadav (born 1967), Indian mountaineer
- Santosh Saini, fictional title character of the movie Santosh (2024 film)
