= Darul Uloom Raheemiyyah =

Islamic madrasa in Kashmir

- Other names: Raheemi Seat of Learning
- Type: Islamic university
- Established: 1979 (47 years ago)
- Founders: Mohammad Rahmatullah Mir Qasmi
- Rector: Mohammad Rahmatullah Mir Qasmi
- Location: Bandipore, Jammu and Kashmir, India
- Website: raheemiyyah.com

Darul Uloom Raheemiyyah (Kashmiri: دارُ العلوٗم رَحیمیَہ and Urdu: دار العلوم رحیمیہ) is an Islamic seminary in Bandipore, Jammu and Kashmir. It was established in 1979 by Mohammad Rahmatullah Mir Qasmi, an alumnus of Darul Uloom Deoband. It is regarded as the biggest Islamic seminary of Kashmir.

== History ==
Darul Uloom Raheemiyyah was established by Rahmatullah Mir Qasmi in 1979. It follows the methodology of Darul Uloom Deoband.

== Faculty ==
- Nazir Ahmad Qasmi, Grand Mufti of Darul Uloom Raheemiyyah is one of the founding members of All India Muslim Personal Law Board. His fiqhi answers appear regularly on the Friday issue of Kashmir Uzma, a sister project of Greater Kashmir.
- Mufti Mohammad Ishaq Nazki, author of Hamare Pyare Makki Aaqa.
