= Nyla Ali Khan =

Indian academic

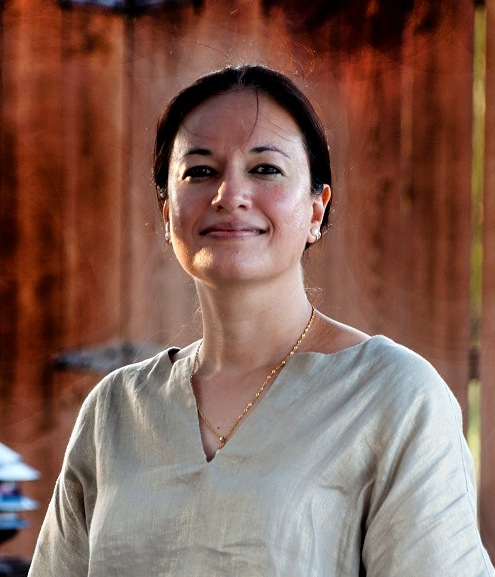
- Born: 28 April 1972 (age 54); New Delhi, India

Academic work
- Era: Modern
- Notable works: The Fiction of Nationality in an Era of Transnationalism; Islam, Women, and Violence in Kashmir: Between Indian and Pakistan

Nyla Ali Khan is an adjunct professor at Oklahoma City Community College. She is a former Visiting Professor at the University of Oklahoma, Norman, and former Associate Professor at the University of Nebraska-Kearney. She is the author of four books, and several articles that focus on the political issues and strife of her homeland, Jammu and Kashmir, India. She is the granddaughter of Sheikh Abdullah.

== Biography ==
Khan was born in New Delhi, India. Her family is based in Jammu and Kashmir, India, and she was raised there in the Kashmir Valley located in the foothills of the Himalayas. Her mother, Suraiya Abdullah Ali, is a retired professor of literature, and her father, Mohammad Ali Matto, was a retired physician. She is the only child of Suraiya Abdullah Ali and Mohammad Ali Matto—and the granddaughter of Sheikh Abdullah. As per her grandfather's biography, her great great grandfather was a Sapru (Brahmin) who converted to Islam in the 19th century. She did her master's degree in English at the University of Oklahoma, focusing on postcolonial literature and theory and obtained her Ph.D. at the same institution.

In May 2015, Khan was the first Kashmiri woman to be nominated and accepted as a member of the advisory council for the Oklahoma Commission on the Status of Women. The council serves "as a resource and clearinghouse for research and information on issues related to women and gender bias, to act as an advisory entity on equity issues to state agencies, communities, organizations and businesses of the state, and to establish recommendations for action to improve the quality of life for Oklahoma women, children and families."

Of her notable grandfather, Khan stated in a 2010 interview that she prefers not to simply live in his shadow but to "stand up for myself and be taken seriously ... express my anger without being labeled an 'Islamic militant' ... [and] legitimately question things I don't understand".

== Publications ==
=== Books ===
In her first book, The Fiction of Nationality in an Era of Transnationalism, she "examines the writings of V.S. Naipaul, Salman Rushdie, Amitav Ghosh, and Anita Desai, all four living abroad to explain the aberrant behaviour of emigres from the Indian subcontinent to explain why they support religious fundamentalist groups in India, Pakistan and Bangladesh." In doing so, she strives to provide an objective view of how transnationalism can distort impressions of reality. In reviewing her book, Khushwant Singh notes that the transnational subjects examined by Dr. Khan "having settled abroad, [...] develop an exaggerated sense of belonging, swallow fabricated history of their glorious pasts and despite having no intention of returning to the lands of their nativity give emotional and monetary support to subversive elements."

- Review by Steven Salaita

In her second book, Islam, Women, and Violence in Kashmir: Between Indian and Pakistan, she examines women in Islam in "the first th[o]rough study of the tragedy of Kashmir done by a Kashmiri woman." "Khan uses the analytical tools of postmodern, feminist criticism to understand and highlight the role--passive and active--that women have played in Kashmir's history, ranging from the 14th century Lal Ded, a mystic poet who laid the foundations of Kashmir's syncretic culture, to the present day Parveena Ahangar who represents the Association of the Parents of the Disappeared People." Interspersed within are oral histories from women who serve to defend Kashmir from invasion, women who had previously been long ignored.

- Review by Brian Hull in Genre Vol. 46, No. 1, Spring 2013, 103–108.
- Review by the University of Nebraska Kearney.
- Review by Amitabh Mattoo in India Today, 22 January 2010
- Review by Jaskiran Mathur in Journal of International Women's Studies Vol. 11 #1 November 2009, 328–332.
- Review by Dr. Mustafa Kamal, "Of women, politics and Kashmiriyat" in Kashmir Times, Srinagar, Monday, 9 November 2009, 3–4.
- Review by Seema Kazi in Conveyor, November 2009, 61–63

She undertakes the role of editor in a third book, The Parchment of Kashmir: History, Society, and Polity. The book presents a collection of essays by Kashmiri academics who are "well-known, well-established, and well-respected within Kashmiri society", but who haven't had much opportunity to reach an audience outside of Kashmir and outside of South Asia.

- Review by Hari Jaisingh in Book Bazaar, 5 May 2013, 1–2.
- Review by David Taylor in Pakistaniaat: A Journal of Pakistan Studies, Vol. 5, No. 2 (2013), 137–8.
- Review by John C Hawley in Journal of Postcolonial Writing, 23 October 2013.

Her fourth book, The Life of a Kashmiri Woman: Dialectic of Resistance and Accommodation examines the life of her grandmother, Akbar Jehan "paint[ing] a loving and personal picture of a powerful woman whose role and actions gave Kashmir a model for women's political action in the critical period before and after the partition of India in 1947."

- Review by Ellora Puri in The Book Review Literary Trust, 12 December 2014.
- Review by Rehka Chowdhary in Oxford Islamic Studies Online, 19 April 2015.

She has recently been working as an editor for a publication on the region of Jammu and Kashmir with Oxford Islamic Studies Online, which has been recruiting guest editors for projects that examine the "politics, religious practices, economics, women's and minorities' rights, geography, arts and culture, [and] major figures" of various Islamic regions. They will be including a featured article by her and plan to expand upon their partnership to provide additional materials to promote education and scholarship about the region.

Khan's latest book, Sheikh Mohammad Abdullah's Reflections on Kashmir, is a compendium of the speeches and interviews of Sheikh Mohammad Abdullah, who reigned as prime minister of the State of Jammu and Kashmir from 1948 to 1953, and who was a large presence on the political landscape of India for fifty years. The volume is designed to enable a student of South Asian politics, and the politics of Kashmir in particular, to analyze the ways in which experiences have been constructed historically and have changed over time.

=== Book chapters ===
- "The Land of Lalla-Ded: Negation of 'Kashmiriyat' and Immiseration of the Kashmiri Woman." Contesting Nation: Gendered Violence in South Asia. Notes on the Postcolonial Present. Ed. Angana Chatterji and Lubna Nazir Chaudhry. New Delhi: Zubaan Books, 2010.
- "Citizenship in a Transnational Age: Culture and Politics in Amitav Ghosh's The Shadow Lines." In Amitav Ghosh's The Shadow Lines: A Critical Companion. Ed. Murari Prasad. Delhi: Pencraft International, 2007. Forthcoming.
