= Nazir Ahmad Qasmi =

Kashmiri Mufti

Mufti Nazir Ahmad Qasmi
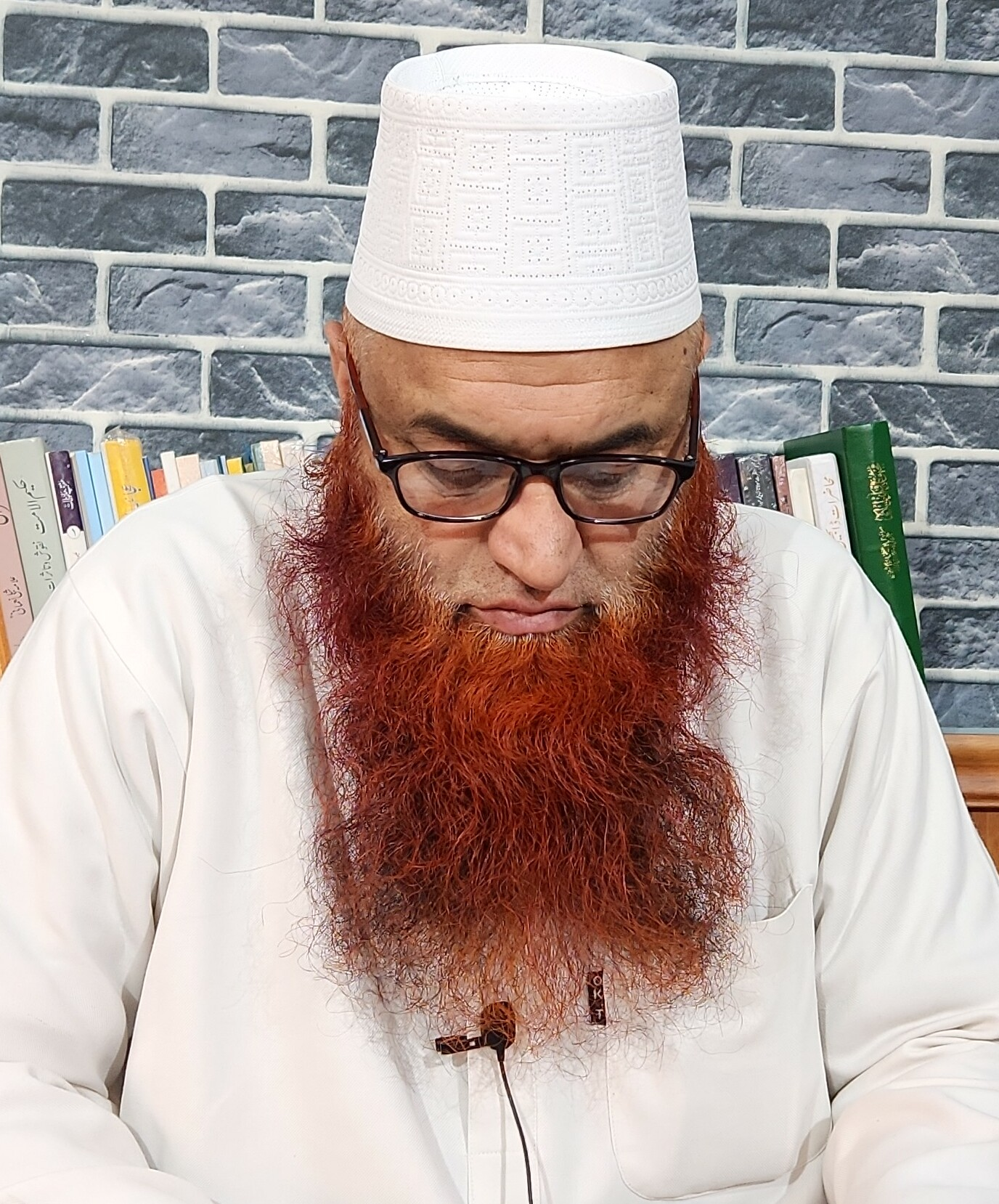
- Qasmi in March 2023

Sadr Mufti of Darul Uloom Raheemiyyah

Personal life
- Born: 20 June 1964 (age 61) Bunjwah, Kishtwar
- Education: Darul Uloom Deoband

Religious life
- Religion: Islam
- Denomination: Sunni
- Jurisprudence: Hanafi
- Movement: Deoband

Nazir Ahmad Qasmi (born 20 June 1964) is a Kashmiri Sunni Islamic scholar and jurist who serves as the Sadr Mufti of Darul Uloom Raheemiyyah. He is an alumnus of Darul Uloom Deoband and the Imārat-e-Sharia; and a member of the All India Muslim Personal Law Board and general secretary of the Majlis-e-Fiqhi, Jammu and Kashmir.

Qasmi's works include Mirzaiyat ka radd - Usūl awr Tarīqa-e-Behs and Islam awr AIDS se tahaffuz ka tarīqa. His religious edicts appear regularly in the Friday edition of Kashmir Uzma.

== Biography ==
Nazir Ahmad Qasmi was born on 20 June 1964 in Bunjwah, Kishtwar. He memorized the Quran at Madrasa Asghria in Deoband and studied primary books of Arabic language at Madrasa Khādim al-Ulūm in Muzaffarnagar. He graduated from Darul Uloom Deoband in the traditional dars-e-nizami course in 1404 A.H and then studied ifta for one year. Qasmi specialized in Islamic law at Imārat-e-Sharia in Patna. His teachers include Abdul Haq Azmi, Saeed Ahmad Palanpuri and Riyasat Ali Bijnori.

After completing his studies, Qasmi began teaching at Darul Uloom Raheemiyyah. At the Raheemiyyah seminary, he serves as the Head Mufti and Shaykh al-Hadith (senior hadith professor). He is a founding member of All India Muslim Personal Law Board and general secretary of Majlis-e-Fiqhi, Jammu and Kashmir. His fiqhi answers appear regularly in the Friday issue of Kashmir Uzma, a sister project of Greater Kashmir.

== Legal rulings ==
In July 2017, speaking in "Conservation of Environment and role of religion", a two-days conference organized by the Central University of Kashmir, Qasmi said, that, "Conservation and preservation of water and other natural resources is a religious obligation for all mankind and not complying is a violation against the compassion of the Creator." Concerning Urdu language, Qasmi rules that, "To learn, write, and gain expertise in Urdu language is a religious obligation upon the Muslims living here (Kashmir)".

== Literary works ==
Qasmi's books include:

- Mirza Qadiyani ke Jhūt
- Mirza Qadiyani na Mehdi na Masīh
- Mirzaiyat ka radd - Usūl awr Tarīqa-e-Behs
- Islam awr AIDS se tahaffuz ka tarīqa
