= Ravinder Pandit =

Indian cricketer

Personal information
- Born: 10 August 1959 (age 67); Srinagar, Jammu and Kashmir, India
- Batting: Right-handed
- Bowling: Right-arm medium-pace

Domestic team information
- Years: Team
- 1978-79 to 1987-88: Jammu and Kashmir

Career statistics
Competition	First-class	List A
Matches	26	3
Runs scored	1179	65
Batting average	26.20	21.66
100s/50s	2/6	0/0
Top score	158	32
Balls bowled	2311	6
Wickets	56	0
Bowling average	27.23	–
5 wickets in innings	2	–
10 wickets in match	1	n/a
Best bowling	8/33	–
Catches/stumpings	11/–	2/–
- Source: Cricinfo, 14 November 2020

Ravinder Pandit (born 10 August 1959) is a former Indian cricketer who played first-class cricket for Jammu and Kashmir from 1978 to 1987.

== Career ==
Pandit had one outstanding match, in the Ranji Trophy in 1986-87. Captaining Jammu and Kashmir against Services, he took 5 for 44 and 8 for 33 with his medium-paced bowling, and scored 158 opening the batting, to lead Jammu and Kashmir to a nine-wicket victory. His 8 for 33 is still the best innings bowling analysis for Jammu and Kashmir, and his 13 for 77 is still the best match analysis. In his second-last first-class match a year later, still captaining the team, he scored 30 and 119 to avert defeat in the match against Haryana.

In 2006 he was one of 23 former Jammu and Kashmir players to be included in a pension scheme run by the Board of Control for Cricket in India.
