= Tanha Ansari =

Kashmiri poet, teacher (1914-1969)

- Born: Hassan Ali Ansari; 1914; Jammu and Kashmir, British India
- Died: 1969 (aged 54–55); Delina BaramullaJammu and Kashmir, India
- Resting place: Delina Baramulla
- Education: BA
- Occupations: Poet, Teacher
- Relatives: Nishat Ansari (brother)
- Writing career
- Pen name: Tanha Ansari
- Language: Urdu; Kashmiri; Persian; Arabic
- Years active: 1932–1969
- Subjects: Politics, Education

Tanha Ansari (born Hassan Ali Ansari; 1914 – 1969) was a Kashmiri poet and school teacher. He wrote in Urdu, Kashmiri, Arabic and Persian languages. He is primarily known for his rebellion poetry against Dogra rule in Jammu and Kashmir princely state, however his work went unnoticed until 1947. After the partition of the Indian subcontinent, he actively participated in Kashmir freedom movement through his writings.

In 1960, he became the recipient of an uncertain National award for the best teacher of the Jammu and Kashmir. It was presented by the former Indian president, Sarvepalli Radhakrishnan. He also worked for local newspapers such as Kehkashaan, Kong Posh, Gulrez, Al-Irshaad, Hamara Adab, Aajkal and Taameer.

== Early life and education ==
He was born in Jammu and Kashmir, British India. His parents belonged to Lucknow. They went to Kashmir when Maharaja Gulab Singh visited the Kashmir Valley. His parents later moved to Magam, Gulmarg. In 1910, his family migrated to Baramulla where he spent his life. He did his Bachelor of Arts and then an uncertain degree in Persian and Urdu. After completing his education, he was posted as a school teacher in Sopore and was later promoted to the rank of headmaster.

== Career ==
He started his literary career in 1932 with Urdu poetry. As a school teacher, he wrote a book titled Taleem-U-Zabaan for teachers which was later introduced to the syllabus of Bachelor of Education and Doctor of Education courses in Jammu and Kashmir. He wrote a Kashmiri poetic book titled Furaat for which the government of Jammu and Kashmir awarded him an uncertain award. His Urdu poetry books such as Shabnamistan which along with Furaat was published posthumously in 1971 and 1972 by his brother.
