= Lalit Gupta =

Indian art historian

Dr. Lalit Gupta
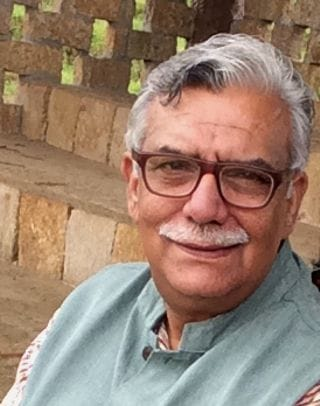
- Born: 29 August 1953 (age 73); Lakhan Pur, Jammu, Jammu and Kashmir
- Education: PHD University of Jammu

Dr. Lalit Gupta (born 29 August 1953 at Lakhan Pur, Jammu) is an Indian art historian, columnist, actor and film maker. He is an authority on Art History, remained head of Art History and Aesthetics wing in State Institute of Music and Fine Arts located in Jammu for three decades. He has remained associated with the prestigious projects that document the heritage, paintings and sculptures of Jammu and Kashmir, and he has created a rare archive of photos and slides of important monuments and art works from all three regions of the erstwhile state viz., Ladakh, Kashmir and Jammu.

Dr. Gupta completed his Ph.D. degree from the University of Jammu, on Buddhist art in 2009. He regularly presents papers in national and international academic seminars, conferences on various areas related to heritage, culture, literature and history of art. He has been associated with various television channels and has directed more than 50 short films, documentaries on various aspects of Art, Culture and Language.

As an actor, he has participated in more than 50 full-length plays being produced by different institutions including Jammu and Kashmir Academy of Art, Culture and Languages. As a script writer he has written a number of popular serials and TV documentaries for Doordarshan on different aspects of Dogra Heritage. He is a popular columnist of state and working for the largest daily newspaper Daily Excelsior being published from Jammu since 1965.

== Other works ==
He is a foudning member of reputed NGOs of Jammu and Kashmir including Preserve Art Treasures and Heritage, Friends of Ladakh and Indian Society for Buddhist Studies.

== Contributions ==
Engaged by Shri Mata Vaishno Devi Shrine Board to prepare a concept design for setting up Dogra Heritage Centre and Museum Jammu. He has also worked for Photo Documentation of Ancient Art, a high-profile project funded by Jammu and Kashmir Academy of Art, Culture and Languages. He also curated a contemporary art exhibition, ‘March 99’ for Amar Mahal Museum and Library, Jammu.

== Memberships ==
He is a member of the Board of Studies, Faculty of Music and Fine Arts, Board of Studies, Centre for Museology, Faculty of Music and Fine Arts University of Jammu.
