= Moonis Shah =

Kashmiri visual artist (born 1992)

Moonis Ahmad Shah
- Born: 31 January 1992 (age 34); Srinagar, Kashmir
- Education: United Nations Madanjeet Institute of South Asian Arts; University of Melbourne
- Known for: Visual art
- Website: www.moonisshah.com

Moonis Ahmad Shah (born 31 January 1992) is a Kashmiri visual artist who lives and works between Kashmir and Melbourne. He has been recognised with the Foundation for Indian Contemporary Art's Emerging Artist Award (2017) and inclusion in Forbes India's 30 Under 30 list. In 2026, Shah was awarded the Connect India dual artistic residency by Arts at CERN and Pro Helvetia. The programme involves research split between CERN's particle physics laboratories in Geneva and the International Centre for Theoretical Sciences (ICTS) in Bengaluru, where his work focuses on the intersection of scientific thresholds, data, and visual language.

== Early life and education ==
Shah was born in Srinagar, Kashmir. He graduated with a Bachelor of Fine Arts (Digital Arts) as a United Nations Madanjeet Institute of South Asian Arts scholar. He later received a VCA Access Mentorship Program at the University of Melbourne and was a doctoral candidate at that university. He completed his doctoral research at the University of Melbourne in 2022 and was a fellow at the Akademie Schloss Solitude between 2023 and 2024. During his doctoral studies he explored ideas of the "anarchic archive" and presented a completion exhibition titled Anarchic Archive: the spectres of inconsistency.

== Work and ideas ==
=== Archival practice ===
Shah's research centres on the politics of archives. In a 2020 interview in Stir magazine, he explained that growing up in Kashmir during periods of socio‑political turmoil shaped his interest in how archives are used as instruments of control. He uses an interdisciplinary approach that blends historical documents, artificial intelligence and satire. His project The Birds Are Coming (2017) imagines a fictional archive of birds accused of espionage; light boxes and an interactive web archive present mug‑shots and investigation reports of these "avian agents". The work comments on the surveillance of people in Kashmir, turning birds into metaphors for people detained or killed at borders.

Shah often re‑engineers archival tools through technology. In one of this projects he employed machine‑learning algorithms to create portraits of soldiers based on oral histories from Europe. In another project, Almost Entirely Sisyphus, he transformed a typewriter, historically a "bureaucratic object of recording," into a machine that signifies "the impossibility of registering disappearance" by typing names of the disappeared without paper. A 2021 Live Mint profile described how he uses photogrammetry and 3D scanning to transform discarded psychiatric instruments from Srinagar and Melbourne into reproducible objects, turning them into "memory collectors". He also reverse‑engineers archives to resist state power; in the same article he stated that he uses the archive as a tool to make visible what has been suppressed by organised knowledge.

=== Voids and gathering ===
Shah frequently explores the interconnected themes of the void and the act of gathering. He argues art should focus on "articulating voids, and the excesses of a state", making visible what has been left in the margins. As a direct response to this, he is preoccupied with the "provocation of gatherings", which he describes as an "important ontological event". For Ahmad, this act of gathering can be conceptual such as in his work that "gathers" the names of the disappeared or political, serving as a powerful method to articulate "what has been made invisible".

== Notable works ==
- The Birds Are Coming Archive (2017) – shown in various galleries across the world and reviewed in Frieze magazine. The installation features light boxes presenting a fictional archive of birds accused of espionage and comments on surveillance in Kashmir.
- Almost Entirely Sisyphus (2021) – a kinetic sculpture comprising a "ghost" typewriter mounted on a red velvet shelf. The typewriter, driven by servo motors and computer code, continuously types the names of people who have disappeared in conflicts, yet the absence of paper means the names leave no physical record. The autonomous memory machine transforms a bureaucratic device into a counter‑monument, memorialising the impossibility of commemoration for the disappeared.
- Accidental, Miraculous Everyday from that Heaven (2021) – a work responding to state of exception in Kashmir. It "reconstructs the imagery of people from difficult places. The human body(ies) merges and blurs as the artist plays with the technique of photogrammetry to thread a collection of two-dimensional images into three-dimensional. The video underscores the impossibility of a seamless run of the images to trace the indexical occurrence of the void. For the artist, it turns into a metaphorical representation of the silence and being silenced a plea to mine their history." In an interview with Live Mint, Shah said he stitched together the "new everyday‑ness" through photogrammetry and video projection.
- Telegrams to Bollywood from a Mad Landscape Scout (2019) – a series of works in which a fictional "landscape scout" from Kashmir, sent to Switzerland to find substitute filming locations after the 1990s insurgency, mails telegrams back home that are returned due to missing addresses. Arushi Vats, explains that the work's use of Arabic, Persian, and English words, along with markings of ink and tea, creates an "illegible journey". This journey explores the violence of empire and the "modern impulse to conquer and annex" natural landscapes. The reviewer suggests the artwork reveals that "hysteria" is not on the edge but at the "heart of reason". It hints at the paradox of animism and how the "onslaught on history" leaves no psyche intact, causing language and form to disintegrate. Najrin, an art critic and a writer based in Delhi notes that the tattered telegrams, covered in dense calligraphic marks, form a para‑archive that exposes how Kashmir's history of conflict is erased from mainstream narratives and highlights "political illegibilities".
- Birds that walk on earth have eyes on the sky – II (2024) – exhibited in the London show (Un)Layering the Future Past of South Asia: Young Artists' Voices at SOAS Gallery. A Stir opinion piece described Shah as a Kashmiri artist and noted that the exhibition showcased works spanning photography, sound art, performance, interactive art and installation.
- Sonic Specters of a Gathering, a publication produced during his fellowship at Akademie Schloss Solitude, challenged the Western understandings of time. They used the mythical bird Lal Muni, which sings in dissent against a king, as a metaphor for sonic markers that resist being contained. This concept of "sonic specters" allows them to explore how sounds from the past can manifest and haunt the present. A key technical and conceptual element of the project is the use of a recurrent neural network machine-learning algorithm. The artists fed this algorithm with protest soundscapes, which included both human and natural sounds. By converting this data into text characters, the algorithm was able to "speculate on new de-sonified data". This new data was then re-sonified, producing outputs like abstract poetry, data visualizations, and new soundscapes.

== Group shows and collaborations ==
In 2021 he took part in In Search of New Names, a learning‑lab initiative by Experimenter Gallery, where his video work addressed Indo‑Pak territorial politics. The following year he participated in Okkoota's Ghosts, organised by Arts House in Melbourne. The exhibition essay noted that he and Phuong Ngo used kinetic sculptures to highlight "hauntings of gaps and absences in our historical memory". In 2025 he was among 26 South Asian artists featured in a London exhibition exploring shared histories and resilience.

== Awards and recognition ==
In 2017 Shah was selected for the Emerging Artist Award by the Foundation for Indian Contemporary Art. In 2021 he was highlighted by Forbes India in its 30 Under 30 list; the magazine noted that the 28‑year‑old artist was born in Srinagar and uses multidisciplinary materials including text, mass media and programming languages to question the constitution and form of institutional history.

== Personal life ==
He lives and works between Kashmir and Melbourne.
