= Baabarr Mudacer =

Kashmiri musical artist

Babar Mudacer
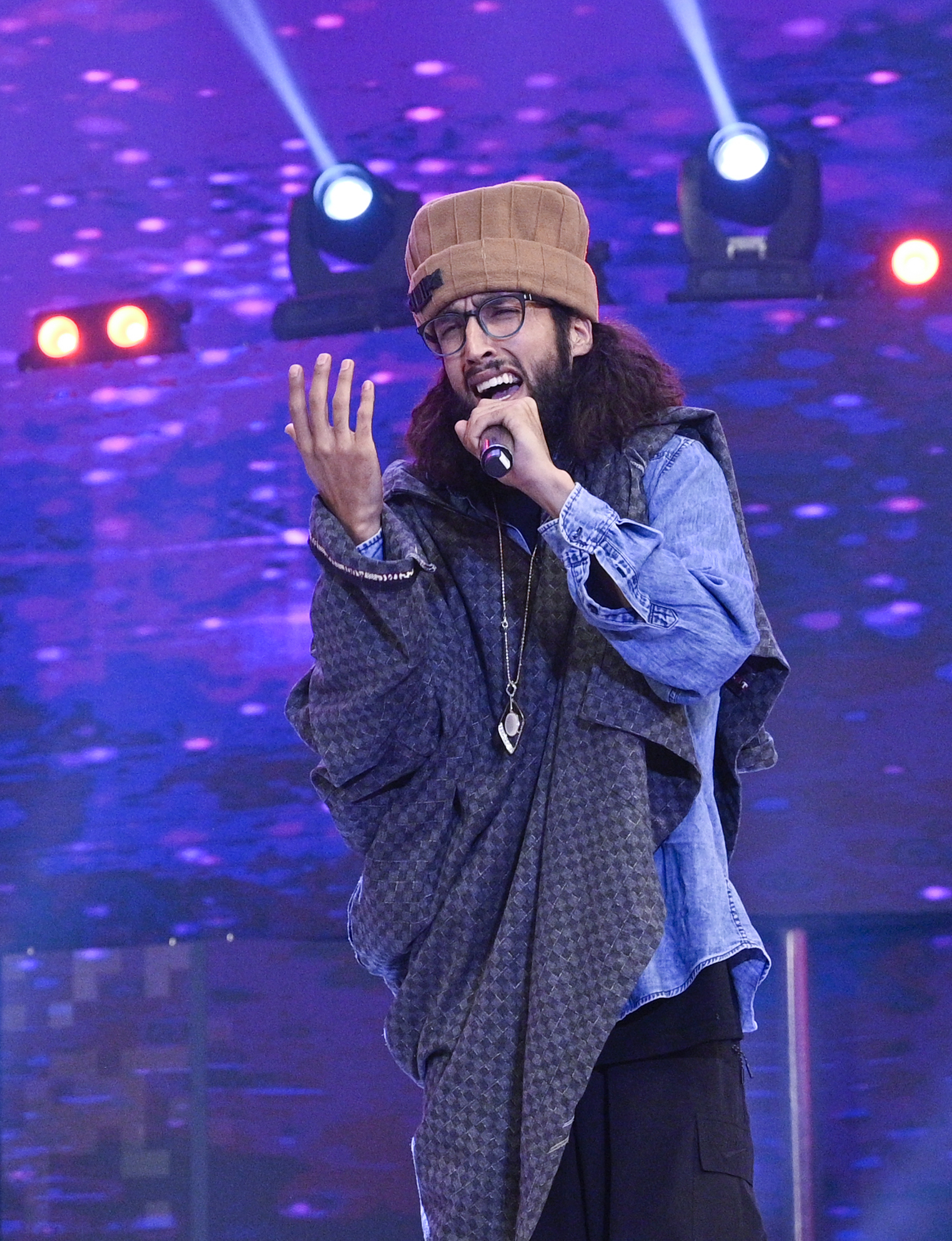

Background information
- Born: Mudasir Hassan; 1995 (age 30–31); Bandipore, Jammu and Kashmir, India
- Genres: Classical music, Rap, Hip hop
- Occupations: Singer, rapper, music producer, lyricist
- Instruments: Vocals, guitar
- Years active: 2018–present

Mudasir Hassan known as Baabarr Mudacer (born 1995) is an Indian rapper from Bandipore, Jammu and Kashmir, India. He is known for his charity works from music.

== Early life ==
Baabarr was born in 1995 in Dachigam area of Bandipore district of Jammu and Kashmir. His father Ghulam Hassan Dar works in a sawmill and his mother Gulshan Ara is a housewife. He completed his middles studies from Eaglet's Public School Bandipora and later from Nadim Memorial Boys' Higher Secondary school Bandipora.

== Career ==
In 2012, after dropping studies, he started his career as a rapper. In 2018, he released his debut "Gah Choun Pewaan" which was written by Habba Khatoon.

He owns a registered brand KashGraph, which also provides assistance to students for competitive exams as KashGraph Online Academy.

After eight years of gap from studies in 2019, he joined college for bachelor's degree. As of 2022, he performed on stage across India at various occasions.

== Music career ==
Mudacer has released a diverse range of songs since his debut in 2018. His discography includes hits such as "Gah Choun Pewaan" (2018), "Zindagi Roshit" (2019), "Haqiqat" (with Abid Wani) (2020), "Dariyaa" (2020), "Khoof" (2021), "Taqdeer" (feat. Ziea Aalam) (2021), and "Peero" (2022).

== Discography ==
This list includes songs performed by him:

1. Gah Choun Pewaan (2018)
2. Yaad (2019)
3. Haqiqat (with Abid Wani) (2020)
4. Dariyaa (2020)
5. Zindagi Roshit (2019)
6. Bella Ciao (feat. Azhar Lone) (2020)
7. Khoof (2021)
8. Toofaan (2021)
9. Taqdeer (feat. Ziea Aalam) (2021)
10. Lost Kashmir Culture (2021)
11. Inj Vichre (2021)
12. Peero (2022)
13. Yateem (2022)
14. Hangaam (2022)
15. Gham-e-Ashiqui (2022)
16. Toofaan 2 (2022)
