= Lakshmana Pandita =

Author

Lakshmana Pandita was the author of Vaidyarajavallabha (also known as Vaidyavallabha), a Sanskrit book on Ayurveda written during the Vijayanagara Empire in the 15th Century. He was a Paramacharya of King Bukka II.

His other popular work is YogaCandrika, a treatise on Ayurvedic medicine.
