= Jammu and Kashmir Right to Information Act, 2009 =

Indian subnational legislation

Jammu and Kashmir State Legislature
- Long title: An Act to provide for setting out the regime of right to information for the people of the State to secure access to information under the control of public authorities in order to promote transparency and accountability in the working of every public authority, the constitution of a State Information Commission and for matters connected therewith or incidental thereto.
- Citation: Act No. VIII of 2009
- Territorial extent: State of Jammu and Kashmir
- Enacted by: Jammu and Kashmir State Legislature
- Enacted: 20-03-2009
- Assented to: 20-03-2009
- Commenced: 20-03-2009

Legislative history
- First reading: Mushtaq Reshi

Repealed by
- Jammu and Kashmir Reorganisation Act, 2019
- Status: Repealed

The Jammu and Kashmir Right to Information Act, 2009 came into force on 20 March 2009, repealing and replacing the erstwhile Jammu and Kashmir Right to Information Act, 2004 and the Jammu and Kashmir Right to Information (Amendment) Act, 2008. The Act is based closely upon the Central Right to Information Act, 2005. Like all RTI legislation, it is intended to provide citizens of the state of Jammu and Kashmir with a legal mandate mechanism for obtaining government records.

== History ==
=== J&K RTI Act 2004 ===
The Jammu & Kashmir Right to Information Act, 2004, was enacted on 7 January 2004. The Rules to the Act were issued on 30 June 2005.

The enactment of this Act came within the larger context of the Right to Information movement in India, which resulted in the passage of several state-level RTI Acts across India, including Tamil Nadu (1997), Goa (1997), Rajasthan (2000), Karnataka (2000), Delhi (2001), Maharashtra (2002), Madhya Pradesh (2003), Assam (2002) and Jammu and Kashmir (2004). The movement culminated in the passage of the (Central) Right to Information Act, 2005, which was partially intended to supersede the various state-level Acts. Furthermore, the (Central) RTI Act, 2005 enshrines stronger provisions than those seen in the individual state-level Acts.

As such, the (Central) RTI Act, 2005 applies to the Union Government of India and all of its states and territories, but not to the state of Jammu & Kashmir. Jammu & Kashmir is accorded special provisions under Article 370 of the Constitution of India, which exempts most legislation passed in the Parliament of India from automatically applying to the state of Jammu & Kashmir. Instead, under the Constitution of Jammu & Kashmir, the state's own Legislative Assembly has the option of (a) voting to "extend" a Union Act to its own state using a special legislative procedure, (b) voting to enact a state-specific law of its own using the traditional state-level drafting process, or (c) simply ignoring the Union Act altogether.

=== J&K RTI Amendment Act 2008 ===
Despite several years of lobbying by citizens' groups, the government of Jammu & Kashmir opted not to extend the Central Right to Information Act, 2005 to J&K. Consequently, residents of J&K seeking information from their state government used the older and weaker Jammu & Kashmir Right to Information Act, 2004.

In, September 2007, the government passed the Jammu & Kashmir Right to Information (Amendment) Act, which was duly notified in the Jammu & Kashmir gazette in January 2008. The Amendment Act, 2008 includes several amendments to the original 2004 act to bring it closer in-line with the (Central) RTI Act, 2005, though it has been criticized by citizen's groups for "watering down" its key provisions. The Amendment Act, 2008 was technically "in force" but was never implemented in spirit. The Rules to the Amendment Act were never issued, and the crucial Jammu & Kashmir State Information Commission stipulated in the Act was never constituted and appointed.

=== Present act ===
In December 2008, the National Conference party led by Omar Abdullah announced that a new RTI Act was among their "election manifesto" goals. The National Conference was elected to power and Omar Abdullah became the state's Chief Minister. A draft bill was tabled on 7 March 2009, and passed by the Legislative Assembly and the Legislative Council by 12 March 2009. The Act was gazetted (came into force) on 20 March 2009. The Rules to the Act were gazetted on 6 June 2009. The government is appointing Public Information Officers (PIOs) and Assistant Public Information Officers (APIOs).
