= Baseer Ahmad Khan =

Indian civil servant

Advisor to Lieutenant Governor of Jammu and Kashmir
- In office 15 March 2020 – 5 October 2021
- Governor: G. C. Murmu; Manoj Sinha
- Preceded by: position established
- Succeeded by: vacant

Divisional Commissioner Kashmir
- In office 29 July 2016 – 15 May 2020
- Chief Minister: Mufti Muhammad Sayeed; Mehbooba Mufti
- Preceded by: Asgar Hassan Samoon
- Succeeded by: P K Pole

Personal details
- Born: 2 June 1959 (age 67) Jammu and Kashmir
- Education: B.Sc
- Occupation: IAS officer, Speaker, author

Baseer Ahmad Khan is a Jammu and Kashmir Administrative Service officer and inducted to Indian Administrative Service (IAS) in 2000. On the 15th March 2020, he was appointed as an Advisor to Lieutenant Governor of Jammu and Kashmir G. C. Murmu in 2020 and Continued to Manoj Sinha. Before advisor he served as a Divisional Commissioner (Kashmir).

== Background ==
In 2009, when he was Deputy Commissioner, Baramulla, he was an accused in the Gulmarg Land Scam. Khan was Deputy Commissioner Srinagar district between December 2011 and March 2013. He was Divisional Commissioner, Kashmir, when he attained the age of superannuation on 30 June 2019; however the government extended his service by a year, but before his term was due to end, he was made the fourth advisor to the Lieutenant Governor of Jammu and Kashmir, G. C. Murmu in March 2020. As advisor he manages the portfolios of "Power development Department, Rural Development and Panchayati Raj, Culture, Tourism and Floriculture " among other things.
