= Ghulam Rasool Khan =

Kashmiri artisan (born 1955)

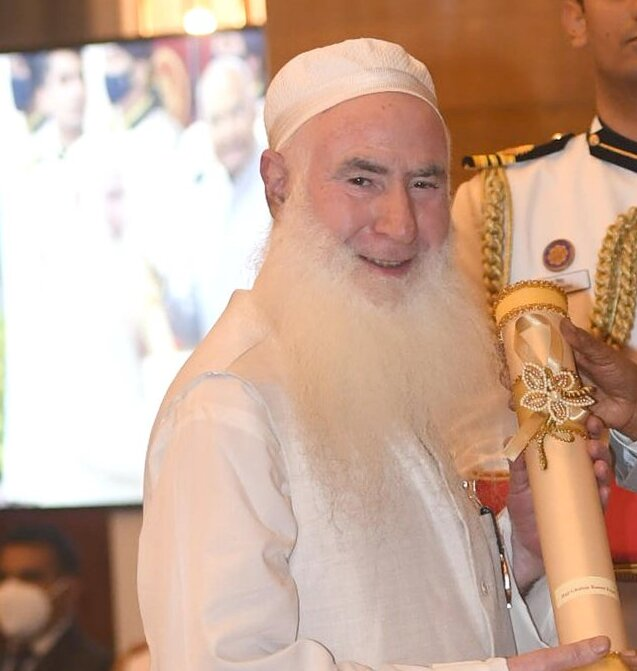
- Born: 1955 (age 70–71); Srinagar, Jammu and Kashmir, India
- Occupation: Shawl artisan
- Known for: Kani shawl weaving
- Awards: Padma Shri (2021)

Haji Ghulam Rasool Khan (born 1955) is an Indian artisan and master craftsman from Srinagar, Jammu and Kashmir, known for his efforts in reviving the traditional Kashmiri art forms of Jamawar patchwork and Kani shawl weaving. As the Chairman of the J&K Art & Craft Development Society, he has become an advocate for artisan welfare and the preservation of Kashmir’s cultural heritage. In 2021, he was awarded with the Padma Shri, India’s fourth-highest civilian award, for his contributions to the arts.

== Early life ==
Haji Ghulam Rasool Khan was born in 1955 in Amda Kadal, one of Srinagar’s oldest neighborhoods. Growing up in a region steeped in the tradition of Kashmiri craftsmanship, he was exposed to the intricate techniques of textile arts from a young age. The Jamawar patchwork, a craft with roots tracing back to the 14th century and attributed to the Sufi saint Mir Syed Ali Hamadani, was a significant part of his early influences.

In 1989, Khan suffered a severe motorcycle accident in Delhi, which resulted in significant injuries and a prolonged recovery period. During this time, confined to his home in Srinagar, he rekindled his connection with the Jamawar patchwork, a craft that had been largely forgotten due to the rise of mass-produced textiles. This period of adversity marked a turning point, as Khan dedicated himself to mastering and reviving this art form.

== Career ==
Revival of Jamawar Patchwork

Following his recovery, Khan transformed his modest home in Amda Kadal into a workshop dedicated to the preservation of Jamawar patchwork. This craft, characterized by intricate paisley and floral motifs on fine pashmina or silk, involves meticulous handwork and techniques such as Sozni and Kani embroidery. Khan’s work is notable for its reliance on memory and skill rather than templates, reflecting the traditional methods passed down through generations.

By the 1990s, the rise of machine-made shawls had threatened the survival of authentic Jamawar, which requires weeks or months of labor-intensive work. Khan’s commitment to working "the old way, thread by thread" helped preserve this heritage craft. His efforts gained global recognition, with his patchwork pieces earning acclaim for their artistry and cultural significance.

Kani Shawl Restoration

In addition to Jamawar patchwork, Khan played a pivotal role in restoring the art of Kani shawl weaving, another traditional Kashmiri craft known for its tapestry-like patterns created using small wooden bobbins. His work in this area further solidified his reputation as a guardian of Kashmir’s textile heritage.

Advocacy and Mentorship

As Chairman of the J&K Art & Craft Development Society, Khan has been a vocal advocate for the welfare of artisans in Jammu and Kashmir. He has trained a new generation of craftsmen, emphasising patience and precision in an era dominated by mechanised production. His mentorship has ensured the continuation of these traditional techniques, fostering a renewed appreciation for Kashmiri craftsmanship.

== Recognition ==
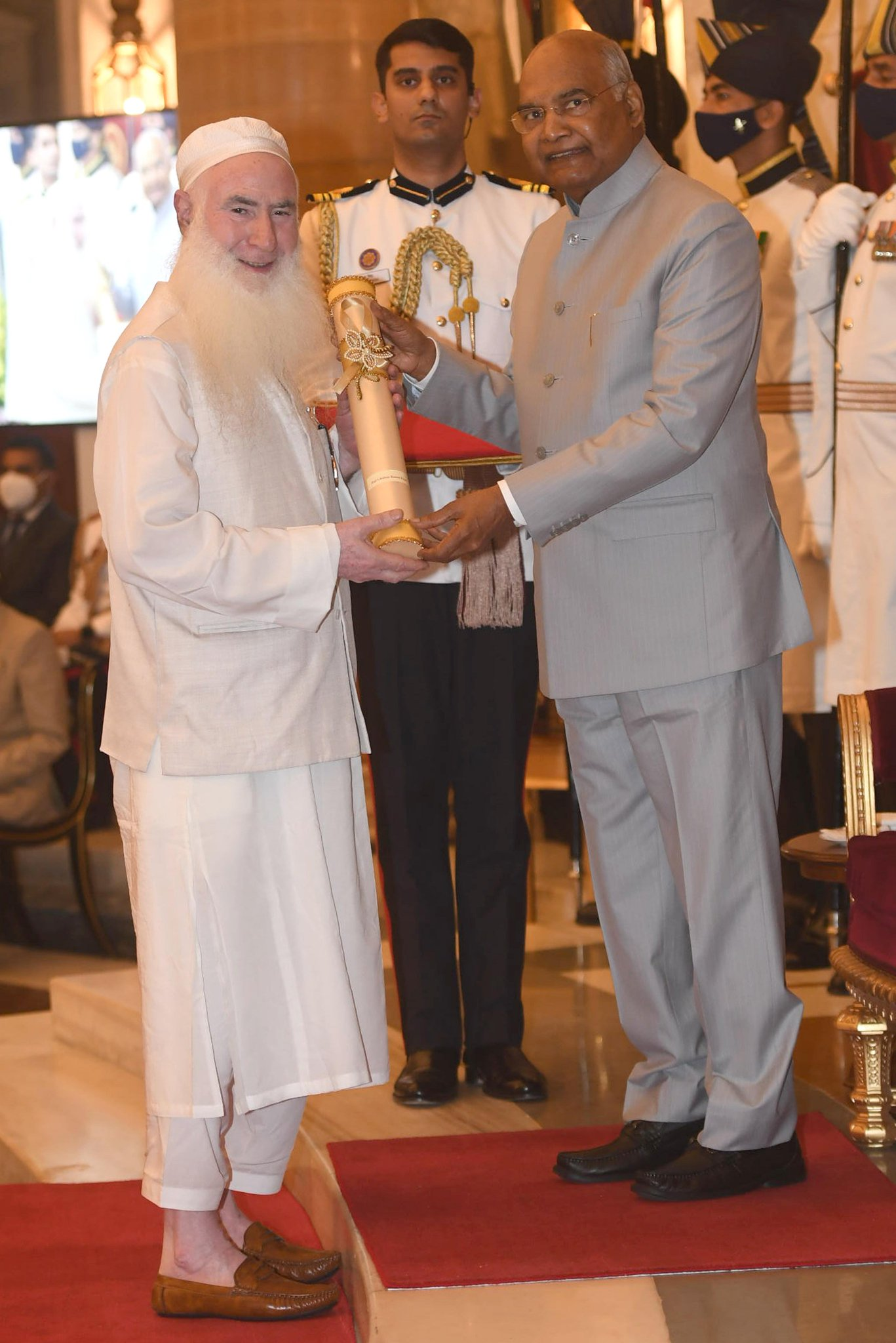
President Kovind presents Padma Shri to Haji Ghulam Rasool Khan for Art.

Khan’s contributions to the preservation of Kashmiri arts were recognized in 2021 when he was awarded the Padma Shri by President Ram Nath Kovind. The award celebrated his role as a "renowned artist and master craftsman" who revived the "innovative art of patchwork" and restored the Kani shawl tradition.

His work has been praised by public figures, including Union Minister Piyush Goyal, who described Khan’s efforts as a "fitting tribute" to the legacy of Kashmiri shawl weaving.
