= Yahya Butt =

Pakistani bodybuilder (born c. 1961–2022)

Yahya Butt یحییٰ بٹ
- ♂ Professional bodybuilder
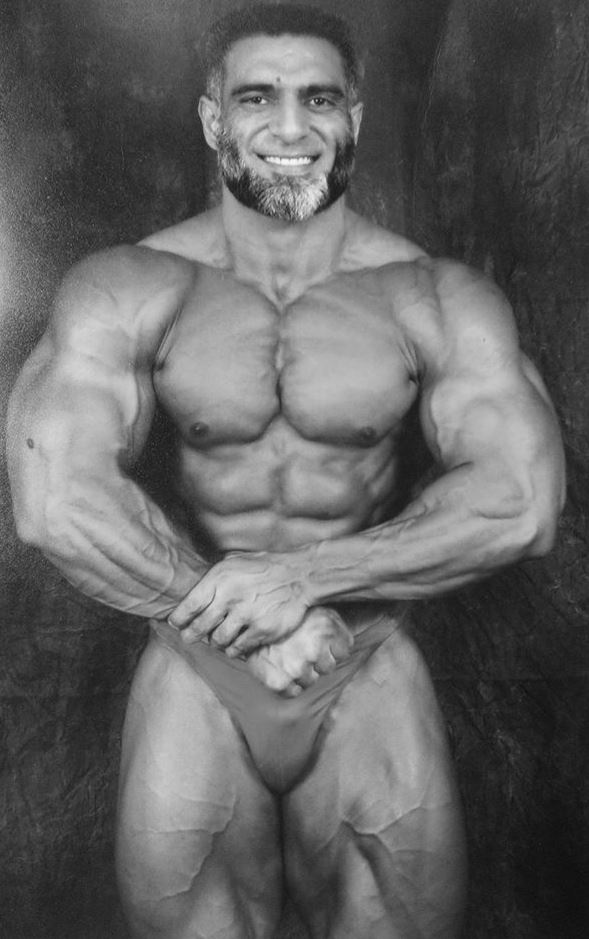
- Yahya Butt after Mr Pakistan Olympia 2001

Personal info
- Born: Muhammad Yahya Butt; 23 April 1965; Gujranwala, Punjab, Pakistan
- Died: 6 February 2022 (aged 56); Gujranwala, Punjab, Pakistan

Best statistics
- Contest weight: 194 pounds (88 kg)
- Height: 5 ft 9 in (175 cm)
- Off-season weight: 260 pounds (118 kg)

Professional (Pro) career
- Pro-debut: Jr Mr. Asia; 1985
- Best win: Mr. Asia (1989, 1990, 1994) Mr . Pakistan (1986) Mr. Pakistan's Olympia (1992-2004)
- Pro years: 1990-2004

Competition record

BodyBuilding

International achievements
1st	1994	Mr. Asia
1st	1990	Mr. Asia
1st	1985	Jr Mr. Asia
2nd	1989	Mr. Asia

National achievements
1st	1986	Mr. Pakistan
1st	1992	Mr. Olympia Pakistan
1st	1995	Mr. Olympia Pakistan
1st	1998	Mr. Olympia Pakistan
1st	2001	Mr. Olympia Pakistan
1st	2004	Mr. Olympia Pakistan

Yahya Bhat/Butt an ethnic kashmiri(23 April 1965 – 6 February 2022) was a leading bodybuilder in Pakistan. He won the Asian Gold Medal three times. He was also the chairman of Punjab Bodybuilding Association. Butt succumbed to bowel cancer and died on 6 February 2022 at a local hospital in Lahore.

Bhat had won the Mr. Pakistan Olympia title five times and represented Pakistan four times in the Mr. Universe competitions. Butt won the Mr. Asia title in 1994. Yahya Butt was also a Certified Trainer from Gold's Gym California, USA. He was a police officer in the Punjab Police. Yahya had retired to divert his attention to bodybuilding. He ran his own gym and ran a sports manufacturing company to manufacture gym equipment.

== Personal life and death ==
Butt died on 6 February 2022 at a local hospital in Lahore. He contracted COVID-19 in 2020 and, after recovering from it, was diagnosed with colon cancer.

Provincial Sports Minister Rai Taimoor Khan expressed grief over his demise and said that Yahya Butt's bodybuilding services could never be forgotten.
