= Samsar Chand Kaul =

Samsar Chand Kaul (Koul) (1883–1977), lovingly known as Sem Kak, was a teacher, collector, writer and naturalist from Kashmir. He taught Geography and Persian at the Tyndale Biscoe School in Srinagar, Kashmir and wrote several books. He travelled across the world with Britishers and was an avid collector of traditional attires, eggshells and bird nests from across the world.

His books include Beautiful Valleys of Kashmir & Ladakh (at least 3 editions), Birds of Kashmir and Srinagar & Its Environs in the 1940s.

Kaul hailed from Rainawari in Srinagar, Kashmir.
