= Prajna Bhatta =

Indian historian

Prajna Bhatta was a historian who wrote Rajvalipataka. It gives a historical account of Kashmir from the time of Zayn al-Abidin to the time of its incorporation in the dominions of the Mughal emperor Akbar in 1586.
