= Showkat Ahmed Shah =

Showket Ahmed Shah President of Jamiat-e-Ahle Hadith, J&K
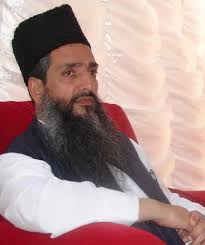

Personal life
- Born: 1955
- Died: 8 April 2011 (aged 55–56) Maisuma, Srinagar, Kashmir
- Cause of death: Explosion
- Occupation: Islamic scholar

Religious life
- Religion: Islam
- Denomination: Salafi

Shaheed Showket Ahmed Shah (Arabic: شهيد شوكت احمد شاه الكشميري ) was an Islamic cleric and leader of the Jammu and Kashmir branch of the Jamiat Ahle Hadith organisation. He was killed in an IED explosion in the Maisuma area in Srinagar of Kashmir, on 8 April 2011. Eight people were accused of his murder, one of whom was killed shortly afterwards; six others were acquitted in December 2020, with the court recommending the same be done for the remaining man. Shah's family rejected the court's verdict, questioning the reliability of the police and state prosecution services.
