= Kewal Kumar Sharma =

Retired Indian Administrative Service officer

Kewal Kumar Sharma (KK Sharma) is a 1983-batch retired Indian Administrative Service (IAS) officer of Arunachal Pradesh, Goa, Mizoram and Union Territories (AGMUT) cadre. In November 2018, he was appointed as advisor to the governor of Jammu and Kashmir, Satya Pal Malik. Following the creation of the union territory of Jammu and Kashmir, he was appointed advisor to lieutenant governors Girish Chandra Murmu and Manoj Sinha. In February 2020, he was appointed as the chairperson of the JK Board of Technical Education. On October 30, 2020, he resigned as advisor to the lieutenant governor and was appointed election commissioner of the union territory. Sharma has also served as advisor to the administrator od Chandigarh, chief secretary of Goa and Delhi after which he moved to the Union HRD Ministry where he served as Secretary Higher Education, Govt. of India.

== Background ==
Sharma hails from Billawar sub-division of district Kathua in Jammu and Kashmir.
