= Baljinath Pandit =

Indian scholar of Shaivism (1916–2007)

Baljinath Pandit (1916–2007) was a Sanskrit scholar and authority on Kashmir Shaivism.

He obtained his Ph.D. at Punjab University and was professor of Sanskrit and Philosophy at Himachal Pradesh University. He was honored for his work by the President of India, and was also on the Muktabodha Indological Research Institute Academic Council.

In 1999 he was on the panel of "Seminar on Kashmir Shaivaism". He died on 7 September 2007.

== Works ==
- Amr̥tavāgbhava; Balajinnātha Paṇḍita (2020) [1963 or 1964]. Sarvatantrasvatantra Mahāmahima-Ācārya Śrīmadamr̥tavāgbhavapraṇītaṃ Śrīsañjīvanīdarśanam (in Sanskrit). Bharatapuram: Miśra Govindaḥ. OCLC 22989210.
- Vālmīki; Prakāś Rām Kurẏgāmẏ; Balajinnātha Paṇḍita (1965). Kāśur Rāmāyan : yaʼanẏ Rāmuʻh tsarẏat tuʼh Lavuʼh kōś tsarẏat (in Kashmiri). Srīnagar: Jammūn̲ va Kaśmīr Akādmī āf Ārṭ and Kalcar ainḍ Lēngvējiz. OCLC 20814965.
- Kāśmīra-Śaiva-Darśana (in Hindi). 1973. OCLC 69323300.
- Aspects of Kashmir Śaivism. Utpal Publications. 1977. OCLC 7905752.
- Vaishṇavī Devī rahasya. Tryambaka Prakāśana. 1983. OCLC 22909119.
- B.N. Pandit. (1989). History of Kashmir Shaivism. Utpal Publications. ISBN 81-85217-01-7.
- Abhinavagupta, Rājānaka; Balajinnātha Paṇḍita (1991). Essence of the exact reality, or, Paramarthasara of Abhinavagupta. New Delhi: Munshiram Manoharlal Publishers. OCLC 49324375.
- B.N. Pandit = Svātantryadarpaṇaḥ : abhinavamadvaitaśaivasastrapathyapustakam-Angalavyakhyayuktam / granthakaro Balajinnātha Paṇḍitaḥ. (1993). Mirror of Self-Supremacy or Svatantrya Darpana. Munshiram Manoharlal Publishers. ISBN 81-215-0559-3.
- B. N. Pandit (1997). Specific Principles of Kashmir Saivism. Munshiram Manoharlal. ISBN 81-215-0729-4.
- translation; commentary by B.N. Pandit; edited by Lise F. Vail. (2004). Isvarpratyabhijna Karika of Utpaladeva: Verses on the Recognition of the Lord, a translation and commentary. Muktabodha Indological Research Institute, Motilal Banarsidass Publishers. ISBN 81-208-1785-0.
- Osnovʹi kashmirskogo shivaizma (in Russian). Moskva, Russia: Profit Stail. 2004. OCLC 61751808.

== Articles ==
- Sahib Kaul's Flash of Self-Realization, Koshur Samachar, Kashmir News Network
