= Rahmatullah Mir Qasmi =

Kashmiri Islamic Scholar

Mawlānā Rahmatullah Mir Qasmi

Rector of Darul Uloom Raheemiyyah
- Preceded by: "office established"

Personal life
- Born: 22 July 1957 (age 69)
- Education: Darul Uloom Deoband

Religious life
- Religion: Islam
- Founder of: Darul Uloom Raheemiyyah

Muslim leader
- Disciple of: Mahmood Hasan Gangohi

Rahmatullah Mir Qasmi (born 22 July 1957) is a Kashmiri Islamic scholar, founder and rector of Darul Uloom Raheemiyyah, one of the largest Islamic seminaries in Kashmir. He is a senior member of the managing committee of Darul Uloom Deoband, founding member of All India Muslim Personal Law Board and a member of the working body of Jamiat Ulama-e-Hind.

== Biography ==
Rahmatullah Mir Qasmi was born on 22 July 1957. He graduated from the Darul Uloom Deoband in 1978. He is an authorized disciple of Mahmood Hasan Gangohi in Tasawwuf. He established Darul Uloom Raheemiyyah, one of the largest Islamic madrasa in Bandipore, Kashmir in 1979. The seminary follows the methodology of Darul Uloom Deoband. He is a founding member of All India Muslim Personal Law Board and a senior member of the managing committee of Darul Uloom Deoband. He is also a member of the working committee of Jamiat Ulama-e-Hind.

== Views ==
In 2018, disagreeing with the J&K State Board of Madrasa Education Act, Qasmi said that, "We know how government interference deteriorated those religious institutions which are affiliated with Waqf." He also said that giving authorization to the boards to take control of accounts in these Madrasas will lead to malpractice in utilization of funds donated by people towards these institutions.

== Literary works ==
Qasmi’s books include:

- Immodesty in Islamic Perspective
- Unexpected Disaster
- Sailab! Aazmaish ya Azab (English: Flood! Test or Torment)
- Mazureen Ke Liye Kursi Par Namaz (English: Prayer on Chair for the Handicaps).
- Aazmin-e-Haramayn Sharifayn Ki Khidmat mai Hadya
- Ulama-e-Kiram awr Aulia-e-Izam Ki Touheen Se Bachiye (English: Don't Defame Scholars and Awliya).
- Khutbat-e-Iman (English: The Speeches of Faith)
- RahmatoN Ka Maheena, Zaruri Masail awr Guzarishat (English: The Month of Mercy, Important Questions and Their Answers).
- Ulama-e-Deoband and their love for Rasulullah
