= Hakeem Ali Mohammad =

Indian Unani physician (1906–1988)

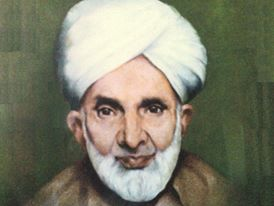
- Born: 13 June 1906; Zaina Kadal, Srinagar, Jammu and Kashmir (princely state)
- Died: 13 February 1988 (aged 81); Gojwara, Srinagar, Jammu and Kashmir (princely state)
- Resting place: Bahu-u-Din Sahib, Srinagar, Jammu and Kashmir (princely state)
- Occupation: Unani Physician
- Known for: Unani Medicine Practitioner
- Spouse: Sidiqa Begum
- Children: Hakeem Muhammad Amin, Hakeem Muhammad Tahir, Hakeem Manzoor and five daughters
- Parent: Hakeem Habib-Ullah

Hakeem Ali Mohammad (1906-1988) was an Unani physician in Srinagar, Jammu and Kashmir, India.

== Early life and education ==
Hakeem Ali Muhammad (حکیم علی محمد) was born in Zaina Kadal, Jammu and Kashmir into a family with a strong tradition in Unani medicine. His father was also a renowned Unani physician. He was a descendant of Hakeem Abdur Rehman, tracing his lineage back to Sheikh Hamza. Originally part of the Kashmiri Pandit Raina family, his ancestors embraced Islam through the influence of Mir Syed Ali Hamadani.

Hakeem Ali Muhammad was married to Sidiqa Begum, and together they had three sons and five daughters. His sons Hakeem Muhammad Tahir and Hakeem Manzoor held high-ranking positions in the Jammu and Kashmir state administration and were also recognized literary figures.

== Career ==
Hakeem Ali Muhammad received his formal education under the guidance of Moulvi Mohammad Hassan Taqi and others, while his Unani medical training was imparted by his father, Hakeem Habib-Ullah. After completing his studies in Unani medicine, he began his practice in Zaina Kadal before eventually settling in Gojwara, where he resided for the rest of his life. Over the years, he gained prominence and served as the president of the Jammu and Kashmir Tibbiya Conference, a regional chapter of the All India Tibbiya Conference. His deep spiritual quest led him to travel extensively, and he remained a devoted Sufi, maintaining a humble and low-profile existence.

== Other activities ==
In 1975, he performed Hajj and subsequently embraced a life of tarik (renunciation). He was closely associated with the revered Sufi saint of Kashmir, Mirak Shah Sahab of Shalimar. In his early years, he held the position of Afsar-e-Mohalla in Zaina Kadal and, post-1947, briefly served as the Emergency Officer (Halqa Kawdara) during Sheikh Mohammad Abdullah's emergency administration. However, his spiritual inclinations eventually distanced him from politics, leading him to fully immerse himself in a life dedicated to Sufism.

== Death ==
Hakeem Ali Muhammad died in Gojwara after a brief illness in February 1988. He was laid to rest in his ancestral graveyard near the Bahu-Din Sahib shrine.
