= Manju Kak =

Indian writer

- Occupations: Writer, filmmaker

Manju Kak is an Indian writer, critic, and an art and cultural historian. She is particularly known for her work on the cultural history of Kumaon and the western Himalayas.

== Education and career ==
Kak did her schooling from a boarding school in Nainital. She has a PhD in Art History from the National Museum, New Delhi, and has been a teacher and visiting professor of art history, literature and cultural studies, in Delhi, the UK, and Hong Kong (Centre for Nehru Studies & Academy of Third World Studies, Jamia Millia Islamia; National Museum Institute, New Delhi; St. Stephen's College & Open Learning University, Hong Kong; St. Columba's School, New Delhi). She has been a recipient of the Hawthornden and Charles Wallace & Ministry of Culture fellowships.

She has worked as a consultant with the Ministry of Culture (50th Anniversary Celebrations) (1997–98); and INTACH, COHANDS ( Handicraft Board). Currently she is Member in Charge in the all India Women's Conference (AIWC) established in 1927, and Trustee of the Lal Bahadur Shastri Memorial Trust. She has served on various NGO committees.

She has also been a volunteer engaged in development issues and women's organizations. She is married to Siddharth Kak, a retired Indian Revenue Service (IRS) officer, and the couple have two sons and five granddaughters.

== Creative output ==
=== Writings ===
Kak's fiction, essays, critical reviews, and articles have appeared in newspapers, journals, anthologies and magazines in India and abroad since 1990. These include The Hindu, Women's Press, The Times of India, The Westview Press, Katha Prize Stories, Kali for Women, Mail Today, Toronto Review, Hong Kong Standard, Arts of Asia, Little Magazine and Canadian Feminist Studies Journal.

=== Exhibitions ===
Kak has been particularly drawn to Himalayan culture, and has researched and curated ethnographic exhibitions on the same. These include 'A Craftsman and his Craft: Iconography of Woodcarvings of Kumaon' (1998); The Uttarakhand Development Report—Handicrafts (2003) 'N. Roerich, Painter of the Himalayas — the Roerich Peace Pact & Banner of Peace' (2009); Kashmiri Pandits, A Vintage Album: The Making of Modern India (2013).

=== Documentary ===
She also directed a documentary film They who walked Mountains (2001), about the erstwhile salt routes from present-day Uttarakhand (India) to western Tibet.

=== Paintings ===
As a painter, Kak had a show titled Ranikhet State of Mind (2016). Some of her art works are in private and public collections in India and Hong Kong.

== Awards ==
- 1990: Award at "Asian Voices in English" sponsored by the British Council and Hong Kong University, (Hong Kong) for "When I Return".
- 1992: The Katha Award for "Blessed are my Sons", India.
- 1995: Senior Fellowship from the Department of Culture, Government of India,
- 1995: Charles Wallace-British Council Award, at the University of Stirling, UK.
- 2003: Hawthornden Fellowship by the Heinz Foundation at Edinburgh, Scotland.

== Publications ==
- First Light in Colonelpura
- Requiem for an unsung revolutionary and other stories
- Nicholas Roerich: Painter of the Himalayas — Legacy & Quest (2013)
- Whose Media — a Woman’s Space
- Just One Life and Other Stories
- In the Shadow of the Devi, Kumaon: of a Land, a People, a Craft (2018)
