= Firdous Tak =

Indian politician

Additional Spokesperson of Jammu and Kashmir Peoples Democratic Party
- Incumbent
- Assumed office 2022
- Lieutenant Governor: Manoj Sinha
- President: Mehbooba Mufti

Member of Legislative Council
- In office 3 March 2015 – 16 March 2019
- Governor: N.N Vohra, Satya Pal Malik
- Constituency: Kishtwar

President of J&K Water Sports Association
- In office 2015–2021

Personal details
- Born: Firdous Ahmed Tak; 1977 (age 48–49) Kishtwar, Jammu and Kashmir, India
- Party: Jammu and Kashmir Peoples Democratic Party

Firdous Ahmed Tak (born 1977) is an Indian lawyer, journalist, author, and politician from the Kishtwar district of Jammu and Kashmir and member of People's Democratic Party. He was elected as member of legislative council from 2015 to 2019. He remained president of Jammu and Kashmir Water Sports Association from 2015 to 2021. He also served as J&K Waqf Board member from 2015 to 2019.

== Career ==
Firdous Tak has worked as a journalist with Los Angeles Times and as of 2022, he is the resident editor of Greater Kashmir. He is also a columnist at Indian Express.

On 3 March 2015, Tak was elected as Member of Legislative Council during PDP-BJP alliance. He was also appointed president of J&K Water Sports Association in the same year.
