= G. R. Santosh =

Indian painter (1929–1997)

Ghulam Rasool Santosh (1929 – March 10, 1997), also known as G. R. Santosh, was a Kashmiri painter and poet. He was best known for his themes inspired by Kashmir Shaivism. In 1979, he became the recipient of Sahitya Akademi Award for his poem titled Be Soakh Rooh.

== Early life ==
He was born Ghulam Rasool in a Kashmiri Muslim family of modest means in the Chinkral Mohalla habba kadal neighborhood of old Srinagar. He dropped out of school after his father's death and took up odd jobs like writing, painting signboards, weaving silk and whitewashing walls. In 1954 he won a scholarship to study fine arts under a celebrated Indian painter, N. S. Bendre in the faculty of Arts, at Maharaja Sayajirao University of Baroda, in the state of Baroda, in the state of Gujarat, in western India.

Around the same time, he did what was considered unusual and unacceptable in conservative Kashmiri society - he married his childhood sweetheart, Santosh, who was a Kashmiri Pandit, and also assumed her name.

== Career ==
In the early 1960s, Santosh studied Tantric (mystical) art and Kashmir Shaivism. In 1964 he adopted this style to create some of the best examples of modern Tantric paintings. His paintings are known for the vibrancy of colors, neat lines, spiritual energy and sensuousness. His paintings have been exhibited in notable international shows including the Tenth São Paulo Art Biennial, 1969 and the 'Neo-Tantra: Contemporary Indian Art Inspired by Tradition' exhibition at University of California, Los Angeles, 1985.

== Death ==
He died on March 10, 1997, in New Delhi, India. He was survived by his wife, a son and a daughter.
