= Hakeem Manzoor =

Historian, poet, author from India (1937-2006)

Hakeem Muhammad Manzoor
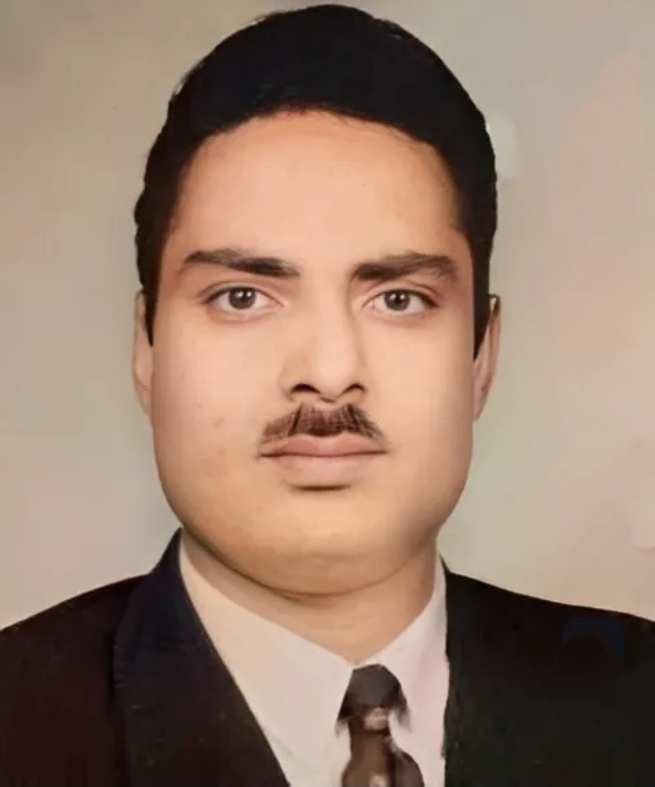
- Born: 17 January 1937, Srinagar Indian Administered Jammu & Kashmir.
- Died: 21 December 2006, New Delhi.
- Resting place: Ancestral graveyard, Bahu-u-Din Sahib, Srinagar, Jammu & Kashmir.
- Education: Master's in Arts.
- Alma mater: S.P college, Aligarh Muslim University.
- Occupations: Administrator, Poet and Writer.
- Notable work: Na Tamaam, Barf Ruton Ki Aag, Lahu Lamas Chinar, Khushboo Ka Naam Naya, Sukhan Barf Zaar, Shiar Aasman, Subah Shafaq tilavat,Barf Aftaab, Kallam Zubaan Shigaaf.(Urdu) Mea chu Vartan tai, Dopmai Balle Yaras (Kashmiri). Iqbal Ek Tazkira (Prose).
- Spouse: Gowhar Manzoor.
- Children: Hakeem Aafaq Manzoor
- Parent(s): Hakeem Ali Mohammad, Sidiqa Begum.
- Relatives: Hakeem Muhammad Tahir

Hakeem Manzoor(حکیم منظور) (17 January 1937 – 21 December 2006). In the latter half of the 20th century, Hakeem Manzoor stood out as one of the most prominent and influential figures in the realm of Urdu language and literature in Kashmir. Possessing a broad and progressive cultural outlook and an extraordinary creative intellect, Manzoor embodied many dimensions, he was a gifted orator, a profound scholar, a connoisseur of aesthetics, and an exceptional administrator.

Hakeem Manzoor was a historian, poet, author, and an accomplished civil servant who made contributions to the administration and literary landscape of Jammu and Kashmir (princely state). Born into a family with a rich intellectual and cultural heritage, he developed a deep love for literature and history from an early age. His keen interest in poetry and prose was nurtured by the vibrant literary environment around him, and his academic brilliance set him apart as a scholar of great depth. Throughout his life, he remained dedicated to the pursuit of knowledge, blending his administrative expertise with a passion for writing, leaving behind a legacy of profound influence in both governance and literature.

== Early life and education ==
Born on 17 January 1937 in Akhoon Sahib, Gojwara, a historical neighbourhood of Srinagar, Jammu and Kashmir (princely state), he received his early education at Islamia High School, Rajouri Kadal, where he was mentored by some of the most respected and dedicated teachers of the time, such as Maulvi Nooruddin, Maulvi Ghulam Nabi Mubaraki, Saaduddin Chishti, Mufti Jalaluddin (son of the noted Kashmiri historian Mufti Saadat of Nowhatta), Ghulam Muhammad Shahdar, Mahmood Wafai, Muhammad Hasan Mahab (the then headmaster), and Pandit Arjun Nath.

He later graduated from Sri Pratap College, Srinagar, where he continued to be inspired by eminent scholars and professors including Prof. Abdul Ahad Rafiq, Maulvi Noor-u-Din, Prof. Ghayas-u-Din, Prof. Jiya Lal Koul (who was the principal as well), Prof. Mohammad Tayyib Shah Siddiqui, and Prof. Mohi-u-din Hajni. However, the most profound influence in his life was his mother, whose wisdom, resilience, and unwavering support deeply shaped his values and intellectual growth. Although he initially pursued science, his enduring passion for literature, history, and philosophy eventually led him to earn a master's degree in arts from Aligarh Muslim University.

Captivated by Urdu poetry, his literary journey began in 1955, with his early compositions appearing in college and literary magazines. Despite the dominant waves of Progressivism and Modernism that swept through the literary landscape of the time, Hakeem Manzoor maintained a firm individuality, preserving a distinct poetic voice that remained uninfluenced by prevailing trends and his poetry mostly focused on Kashmir. His unquenchable thirst for knowledge and wide-ranging intellectual curiosity laid the groundwork for his multifaceted contributions to administration, literature, and journalism.

== Career ==
Manzoor joined Jammu and Kashmir Administrative Service (JKAS) civil administration and excelled in various capacities, earning a reputation as a highly efficient and capable officer. Over his career, he served as the Custodian of Evacuees Property - Jammu, Assistant Commissioner, Secretary, Jammu Development Authority (JDA), Resident Commissioner Government of Jammu & Kashmir, New Delhi, Additional Secretary/Director of Agriculture Department Government of Jammu & Kashmir, Director School Education Kashmir and later as Deputy Commissioner Baramulla. His exceptional leadership, administrative acumen, and commitment to public service earned him immense respect among colleagues and the community. He was known for his integrity, visionary approach, and ability to implement impactful policies that brought positive change. His contributions to governance and public welfare left a lasting legacy, making him one of the most respected officers of his time.

In addition to serving in various governmental roles in Jammu & Kashmir (princely state), Hakeem Manzoor was deeply involved with several esteemed literary institutions. Notably, he served as the President of Bazm Farogh-e-Urdu Jammu for 15 years. His literary affiliations also included roles as Vice President of the All India Urdu Writers and Editors Forum, Vice President of the Association for Development of Urdu Hind (Jammu), Convenor of the All-India Urdu-Hindi Sangam (Kashmir), President of the Jammu & Kashmir Writers Council, President of the Association of Poets (Srinagar), Secretary of Arbab-e-Zoaq (Srinagar)and President Writers Guild (Srinagar).

== Published works ==
Beyond his administrative tenure, Manzoor emerged as a prominent figure in urdu literature, leaving a mark through his contributions. Writing under the pen name Hakeem Manzoor, he established a distinct literary identity within the rich cultural tapestry of Jammu & Kashmir (princely state) and earned admiration across the broader Indian subcontinent. A gifted poet, he began his creative journey in 1964, displaying an extraordinary command over poetry, couplets, and ghazals. Although well-versed in various forms of writing, his true passion always lay in poetry. His poetic works resonated widely within the urdu literary sphere, receiving critical acclaim and a devoted readership. Esteemed poets and critics like Raj Narayan Raz, Mazhar Imam, Arsh Sahbai, Zubair Rizvi, and Shamsur Rahman Faruqi. recognized and lauded his exceptional artistry, acknowledging him as a uniquely creative and influential voice in contemporary urdu poetry.

Manzoor’s poetry was known for its distinctive style, evocative imagery, and profound depth. His ability to weave emotions with eloquent expressions captivated audiences, leaving them mesmerized by his masterful use of words and themes. His poetic compositions reflected a rare blend of classical finesse and modern sensibilities, employing innovative techniques, striking metaphors, and powerful similes. His works beautifully portrayed the essence of Kashmir, its culture, and the complexities of Kashmiri society, resonating deeply with readers.

Hakeem Manzoor’s poetry draws on the natural landscape and cultural heritage of Kashmir, rendering his work both a celebration and a preservation of its composite heritage. His use of culturally resonant symbols -Chinar (Platanus orientalis), Saffron, Apple, Deodar (Cedrus deodara) and the flowing waters of iconic rivers and lakes like Jhelum River, Dal Lake, Wular and Aharbal - transcends mere imagery, becoming a conduit for ecological awareness and traditional continuity.

گہری ہوئی ہیں اور بھی ڈل کی خموشیاں جہلم پہ جو رواں تھی، وہ گفتار سوگئی	The silences of Dal have deepened even more, That flowing speech upon the Jhelum-has fallen asleep.

He captures the essence of Kashmir's natural beauty while highlighting aesthetical elements like the Sheen (snow), Kanger, Walnut (akhrot), Noon chai (salted tea) and Almond (badam).

تازہ دم نمکین چائے، کانگڑی ہستی ہوئی برفِ گل بو پہنچے، پھر مُدعا کیا پوچھنا	Fresh and lively salted tea, a smiling kangri in hand, When the scent of snow-kissed blossoms arrives-what more could one ask for.

رنگین تتلیوں کے پروں کی کہانیاں بادام چشم ، سیب شفق کی محبتیں	Stories of the colorful wings of butterflies, Love of almond eyes and apple-blush evenings.

These symbols serve not merely as poetic devices but as a call for eco-consciousness, urging readers to preserve the 'culture and identity' nurtured by the Sufi and Rishi traditions. Manzoor emerges as a true companion of nature, seamlessly weaving together the threads of environment and heritage. His verses reflect a profound understanding that nature and culture are intrinsically connected where the ruin of one leads to the withering of the other. At the heart of his work lies a deep reverence for the cultural and spiritual history of Jammu and Kashmir (princely state), especially the legacy of its Sufis. Hakeem Manzoor was a torchbearer of timeless values and was deeply respected by the public for his integrity, foresight, enlightened conscience, scholarly demeanour, humility, and moral uprightness. He remained indifferent to superficial fame and material recognition, never viewing poetry as a means of livelihood but rather as a sacred mode of expression. His unwavering principles often came at a personal cost, yet he stood firm in his convictions, never compromising on his ideals or the dignity of his craft.

Several of Hakeem Manzoor’s poetry collections have been published over the years, each reflecting his literary brilliance and unique voice. His acclaimed works in urdu poetry include Na Tamaam (1977), Lahu Lamas Chinar (1982), Barf Rutun ki Aag (1990), Khushboo Ka Naam Naya (1991), Phool Shafaq Aangan Ke (1993), Shair Aasmaan (1997), Subah Shafaq Tilavat (1998), Barf Aftaab (2000), Sukkhan Barf Zaad (2003), and Kallam Zubaan Shigaaf (2005). In Kashmiri, his poetic contributions include Mea Chu Vartav Tai (1998) and Dopmai Baale Yaaras (1998). His work in prose features Iqbal Ek Tazkira, along with an unpublished manuscript titled The Land of Apples. Through his poetry, Hakeem Manzoor not only celebrated the cultural richness of Kashmir but also brought a fresh, vivid style that established him as one of the most distinguished poets of his time.

== Other activities ==
In addition to being a distinguished poet and accomplished administrator, Hakeem Manzoor made a lasting impact in the field of journalism after voluntarily retiring from government service. He founded Khabar-o-Nazar, a trilingual weekly newspaper, publishing consistently without interruption, for the final 11 years of his life. Among Urdu dailies and weeklies in Kashmir, Khabar-o-Nazar stood out second perhaps only to Aina, in gaining recognition beyond the region and earning a respected place in the broader Urdu-speaking world. The newspaper not only mirrored the political landscape of Kashmir but also became a powerful voice for its literary and social consciousness. Hakeem Manzoor used the platform of print media to give voice to the concerns and struggles of the Kashmiri people. His fearless, thought-provoking writings tackled vital social, political, and economic issues, earning him widespread respect in journalistic circles across Jammu and Kashmir (princely state). One of the newspaper’s most notable features was a dedicated page for Kashmiri language and literature, a single page that arguably did more to promote Kashmiri literary heritage than many voluminous journals published in the language. Admired for his integrity, depth, and unwavering commitment to truth, Manzoor consistently used his pen to advocate for justice, equality, and the preservation of Kashmir’s rich cultural identity. His contributions to journalism remain an integral part of his legacy, continuing to inspire future generations of writers, poets, and journalists.

== Awards and appreciation ==
Hakeem Manzoor's remarkable contributions to poetry and literature left a lasting impact on the cultural outlook. His work resonated across linguistic and regional boundaries, earning widespread appreciation for its depth, elegance and cultural significance. His works beautifully captured the essence of Kashmiri philosophy, history and the socio-political landscape, resonating with readers across generations. Through his poetry, he expressed profound emotions, patriotism and the struggles of his people, leaving a lasting impact on the literary world. In recognition of his literary legacy, several esteemed institutions honoured him, including the University of Kashmir, which dedicated a commemorative day in his memory. Over the years, he was also the recipient of numerous prestigious honours and awards notably from the Jammu and Kashmir Academy of Art, Culture and Languages, West Bengal Urdu Academy, Uttar Pradesh Urdu Academy, Mard-e- Baramulla and posthumously, Mehjoor Foundation.

== Death ==
After a brief illness, Manzoor died on 21 December 2006 in New Delhi. He was laid to rest in his ancestral graveyard near Bahu-din Sahib, beside his parents. His legacy continues to inspire both the literary and administrative spheres of Jammu and Kashmir.
