= Media in Jammu and Kashmir =

Media in the Indian-administered region of Jammu and Kashmir

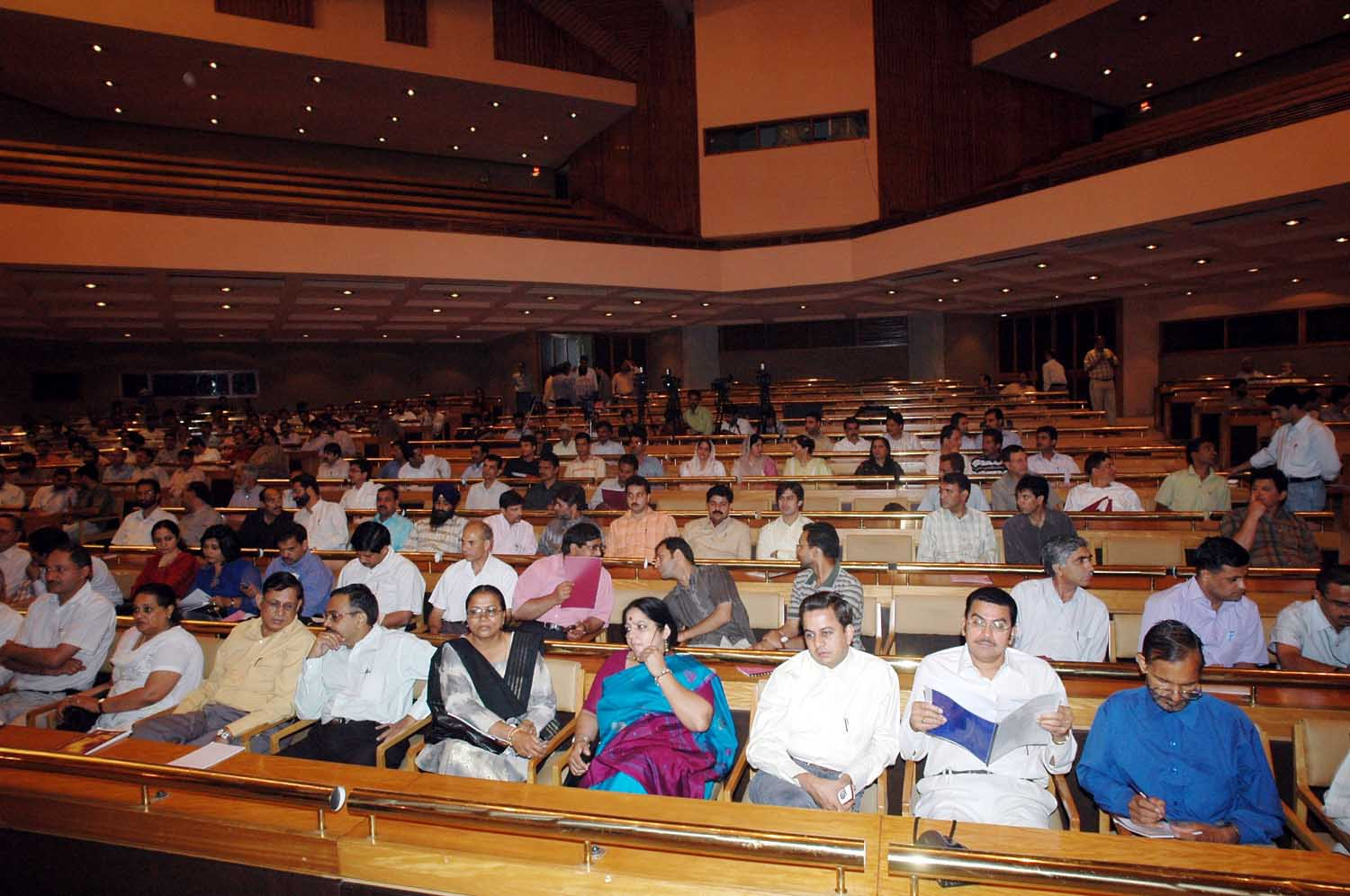
- Media Editors' Conference at Srinagar
- Type: Media
- Region served: Jammu and Kashmir (union territory)
- Official language: Kashmiri, Dogri, Punjabi, Pahari, Gojri, Urdu, Hindi, English, Bhaderwahi, Sarazi
- Print Media: Daily Excelsior; Greater Kashmir; Rising Kashmir; kashmir Pen
- Electronic Media: DD Kashir; Radio Sharda; Red FM 93.5
- Digital Media: The Dispatch; The Kashmir Walla; The Kashmiriyat; The Chenab Times; kashmir Pen

Media in Jammu and Kashmir comprises print, broadcast, and digital media serving the union territory of Jammu and Kashmir. The region's media landscape reflects its linguistic, cultural and geographic diversity, with publications and broadcasters operating in languages including Kashmiri, Urdu, Dogri, Gojri, Pahari, Punjabi, Hindi and English.

Media in Jammu and Kashmir has evolved from the establishment of printing presses during the Dogra period to a diverse ecosystem of newspapers, radio stations, television channels and digital news platforms. The sector has also been shaped by the political and security situation in the region, including periods of censorship, restrictions on communication and debates surrounding press freedom.

In addition to news media, Jammu and Kashmir has a significant literary and publishing tradition, with books and periodicals documenting the region's history, culture, literature and contemporary affairs.

== History ==
=== Early years ===
The development of media in Jammu and Kashmir began with the introduction of printing technology during the 19th century. In 1858, during Dogra rule, the Vidya Vilas Press was established in Jammu for the printing of official documents and government publications. The introduction of the printing press marked an important stage in the development of communication and publishing in the region.

Over time, the growth of newspapers, magazines and publishing houses contributed to the emergence of a regional public sphere, with publications appearing in multiple languages and serving diverse communities across Jammu and Kashmir.

=== Conflict and media ===
The Kashmir conflict has significantly influenced media practices and institutions in Jammu and Kashmir. Journalists and media organisations have operated under challenging conditions, including restrictions on reporting, communication disruptions and security concerns. Media coverage of political developments and conflict-related issues has frequently been the subject of debate among journalists, policymakers and civil society groups.

== Types of media ==
=== Print media ===
Print media has historically played a central role in the dissemination of news and public information in Jammu and Kashmir. Newspapers and magazines published from the region have served as important sources of political, social and cultural reporting.

Prominent publications include Greater Kashmir, Rising Kashmir, Kashmir Observer, Kashmir Times, Daily Excelsior, The Kashmir Magazine and Kashmir Pen. These publications cover regional, national and international affairs and contribute to public discourse within the union territory.

Major newspapers and periodicals published in Jammu and Kashmir include Greater Kashmir, Kashmir Observer, Rising Kashmir, Kashmir Times, Daily Excelsior, Early Times, Srinagar Jang, Aftab, The Northlines, Elite Kashmir, Kashmir Monitor and Indian Times.

=== News agencies ===
Several news agencies operate in Jammu and Kashmir and provide news coverage to newspapers, broadcasters and digital media platforms. These include Kashmir News Service (KNS), Kashmir News Bureau (KNB), Kashmir News Observer (KNO), Global News Service (GNS), Current News Service (CNS), Only Kashmir and Asian News International.

According to a 2017 report by the Press Council of India titled Media and Media Scenario of J&K, 467 newspapers and periodicals approved by the Government of Jammu and Kashmir were eligible to receive government advertisements, of which 146 were empanelled with the Directorate of Advertising and Visual Publicity (DAVP).

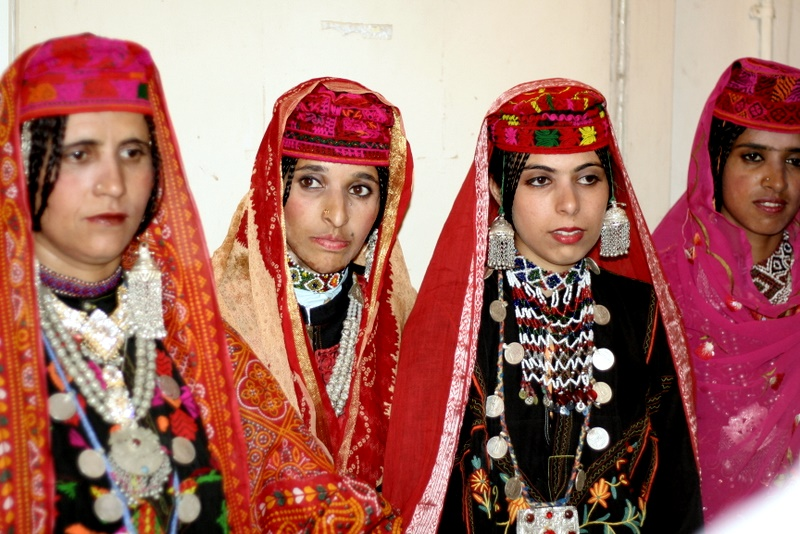
Gojri folk singers

=== Broadcast media ===
Broadcast media has played an important role in the dissemination of news, public information and cultural programming in Jammu and Kashmir. Radio, in particular, has historically been one of the most accessible forms of mass communication in the region.

Radio Kashmir, operated by All India Radio, has long served as a major broadcaster of news and cultural programming. In addition to state-run broadcasters, private FM stations and community radio initiatives have contributed to the region's broadcasting landscape.

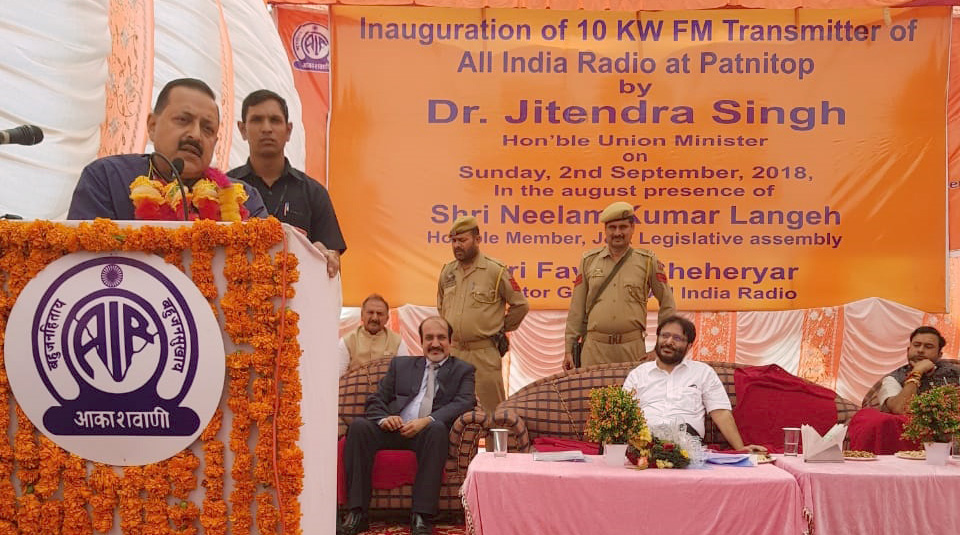
All India Radio programme at Patnitop

Radio stations operating in Jammu and Kashmir include AIR Srinagar, AIR Jammu and Radio Sharda. Radio Jammu Kashmir was the first broadcasting centre in the region and began operations on 1 December 1947.

Radio Sharda, a community radio service established for the Kashmiri Pandit diaspora, was founded by Ramesh Hangloo.

Private FM broadcasters such as FM Tadka 95.0, BIG FM 92.7, Radio Mirchi and Red FM 93.5 have expanded radio broadcasting in urban centres including Jammu and Srinagar.

=== Television ===
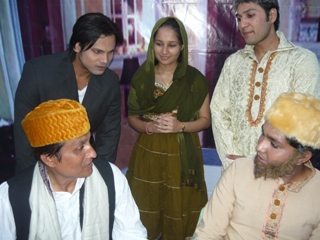
Scene from the television play Aatish-e-Kashmir

Television broadcasting in Jammu and Kashmir includes both public and private channels. DD Kashir, operated by Doordarshan, is the principal Kashmiri-language television channel and broadcasts news, cultural programmes and entertainment content across the region.

One of its most widely viewed programmes was Kus Bani Koshur Karorpaet, a Kashmiri-language quiz show inspired by the format of Who Wants to Be a Millionaire?.

Private television broadcasters have also expanded their presence in the region. Channels such as News18 Urdu and Gulistan News provide news and current affairs programming to audiences in Jammu and Kashmir.

=== Cinema and music ===
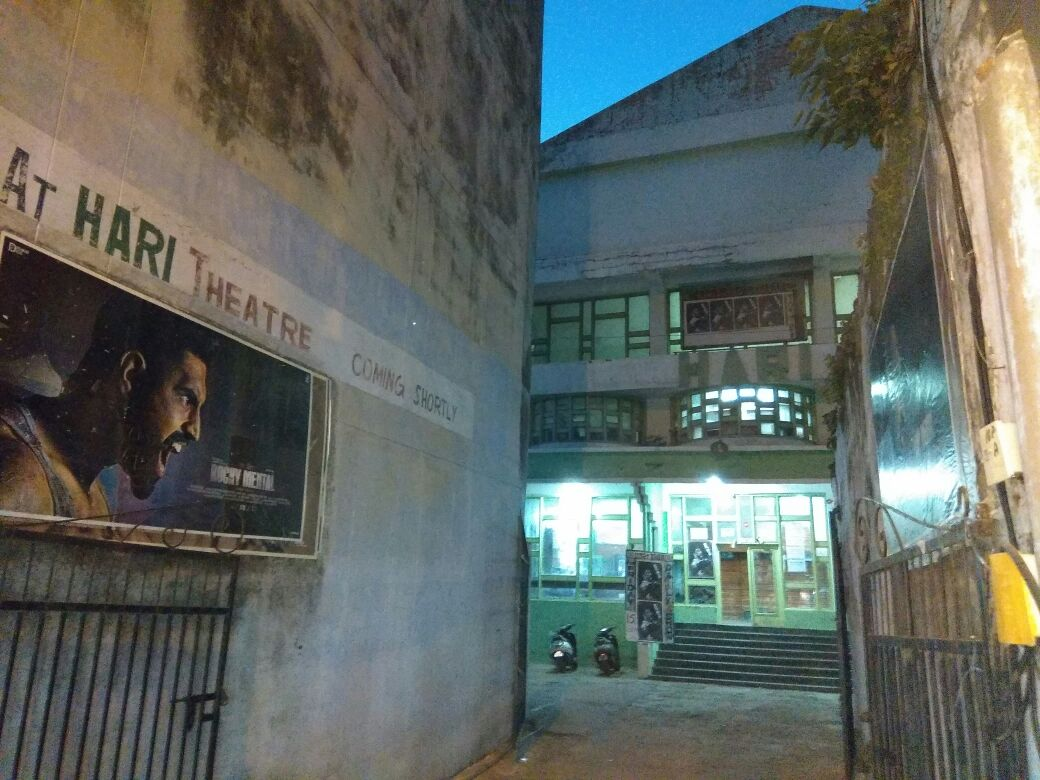
Hari Theatre in Jammu

Cinema and music have long been important components of the cultural landscape of Jammu and Kashmir. The region has produced distinct traditions of Kashmiri cinema and Dogri cinema, while its music industry encompasses a variety of folk, devotional and contemporary genres.

A number of cultural institutions and music labels have contributed to the preservation and promotion of regional music traditions, including the Jammu and Kashmir Academy of Art, Culture and Languages (JKAACL), Music Tape Industry (MTI) Studios and regional divisions of national music companies.

Traditional musical forms of the region include Chakri, Henzae, Wanvun, Ladishah, Bacha Nagma, Dumhal, Dogri folk music and Gojri music. Prominent performers associated with the region include Raj Begum, Vibha Saraf, Qazi Touqeer, Shameem Dev Azad, MC Kash and other artists who have contributed to the preservation and development of regional musical traditions.

The Kashmir conflict had a significant impact on the cinema industry in the region. Following the outbreak of insurgency in 1989, most cinema halls in the Kashmir Valley ceased operations. Several theatres were either abandoned or repurposed for security-related uses during the conflict.

Attempts to revive cinema culture in the Valley gained momentum during the late 2010s. During the Kashmir World Film Festival in 2017, political leaders and members of the film community renewed discussions regarding the reopening of cinema halls in Kashmir.

By 2020, efforts were underway to establish Kashmir's first multiplex in Srinagar, reflecting broader attempts to revive film exhibition in the region.

=== Digital media ===
The growth of internet access and digital communication technologies has transformed the media landscape of Jammu and Kashmir. Online news platforms, social media networks and independent digital publications have expanded access to information beyond traditional print and broadcast media.

A number of digital news organisations operate in the region, including Free Press Kashmir, The Dispatch, The Kashmir Walla, The Kashmiriyat, The Kashmir Pulse, Kashmir News Service, and The Chenab Times. These platforms publish reporting on politics, society, culture, environment and regional affairs, often serving audiences within and outside Jammu and Kashmir.

Digital journalism has also contributed to the expansion of multilingual media in the region. Several platforms publish content in regional and minority languages in addition to English and Urdu. The Chenab Times has received national attention for publishing news content in endangered regional languages such as Bhaderwahi and Sarazi, with commentators describing the initiative as an effort to support language preservation through journalism.

Independent digital media outlets have increasingly become part of discussions concerning press freedom, media regulation and online censorship in Jammu and Kashmir. Several organisations, including The Kashmir Walla, The Kashmiriyat and The Chenab Times, have attracted national and international attention in connection with debates surrounding restrictions on digital journalism and freedom of expression in the region.

Social media platforms have also emerged as significant sources of information. Accounts and services such as Kashmir Weather have gained substantial public audiences by providing weather updates, emergency information and public-interest announcements.

== Freedom of press ==
Press freedom in Jammu and Kashmir has been a subject of debate among journalists, media organisations, governments and civil society groups. Reporting in the region has often been shaped by political instability, security concerns, communication restrictions and competing narratives surrounding the Kashmir conflict.

Journalists and media organisations have periodically reported legal, administrative and logistical challenges affecting their work. Press freedom groups have also documented concerns relating to censorship, communication restrictions, intimidation and the detention of journalists.

=== Media issues in Jammu and Kashmir ===
According to reports by press freedom organisations and media watchdogs, journalists working in Jammu and Kashmir have faced a range of challenges, including restrictions on movement, communication disruptions, threats from militant groups and scrutiny from state authorities.

Since 1990, at least 19 journalists have been killed in Jammu and Kashmir, making it one of the most challenging environments for media practitioners in South Asia.

=== Media coverage of the Kashmir conflict ===
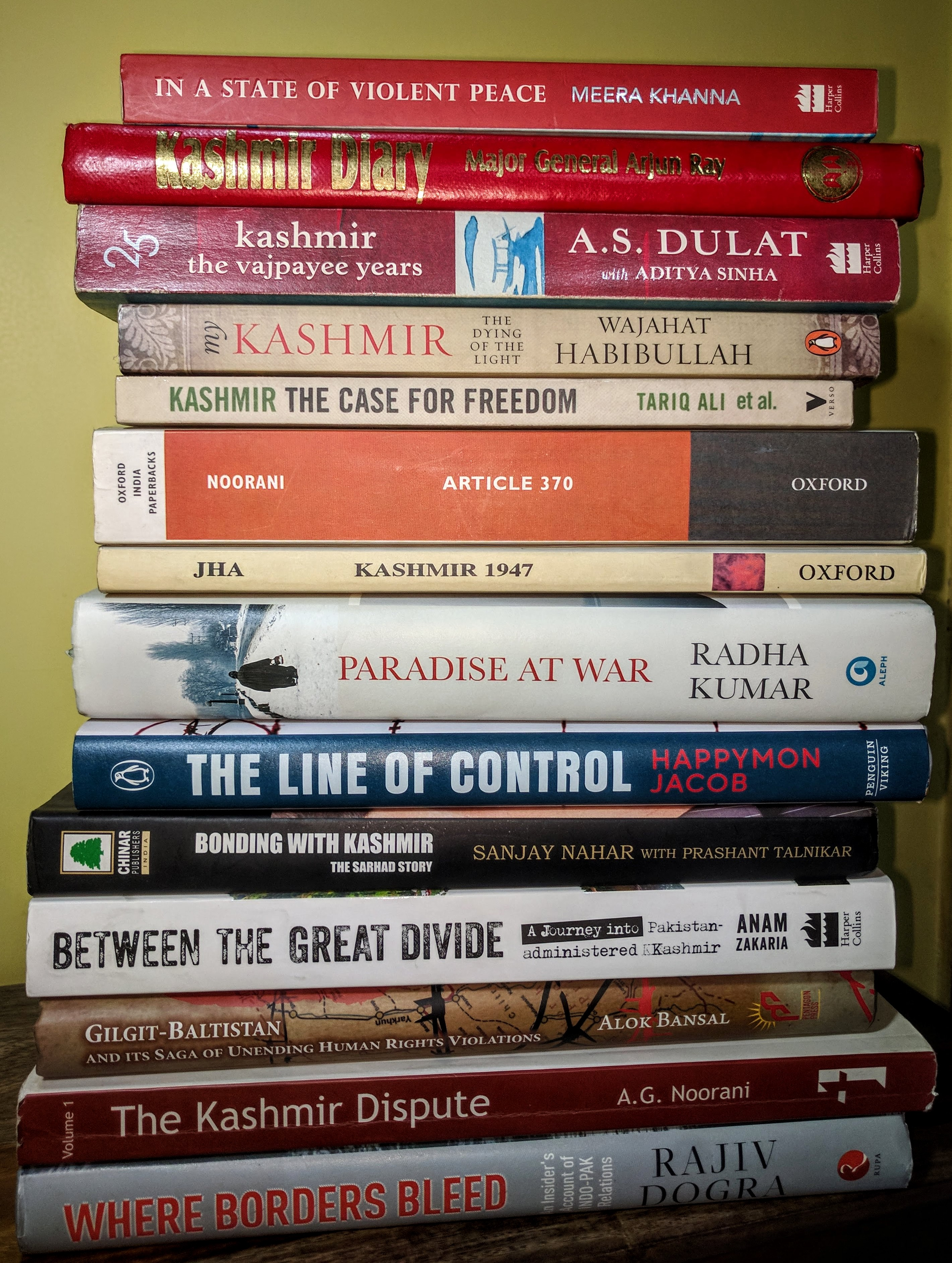
A collection of books on Kashmir by various authors

The media coverage of the Kashmir conflict has been the subject of academic and professional scrutiny. Scholars have examined how newspapers and broadcasters in India and Pakistan have reported on developments in the region and how competing national narratives have influenced coverage.

A study by Chindu Sreedharan found a predominance of what the author described as "anti-peace news" in coverage of Kashmir by sections of the Indian and Pakistani press, arguing that reporting was frequently influenced by official narratives and political considerations.

A study published in the Pakistan Journal of History and Culture concluded that newspapers in both India and Pakistan frequently framed the Kashmir issue in ways that reflected the foreign policy positions of their respective states.

Research has also examined media coverage of major events in the region. A Reuters Institute Fellowship paper analysing coverage of the 2014 Kashmir floods concluded that reporting by several New Delhi-based media organisations disproportionately focused on the role of the Indian armed forces, while comparatively limited attention was given to the role of local volunteers and community-led relief efforts.

=== Attacks on journalists in the Kashmir conflict ===
Since the beginning of the insurgency in 1990, numerous journalists have been killed, injured or threatened while carrying out their work in Jammu and Kashmir.

Among the most notable cases was the killing of Lassa Kaul, director of Srinagar Doordarshan, in 1990.

Other journalists killed during the conflict include Ghulam Muhammad Lone, Asiya Jeelani, Pradeep Bhatia and Shujaat Bukhari.

According to the Government of India, investment in public broadcasting infrastructure, including Doordarshan and All India Radio, was intended in part to strengthen information dissemination and counter misinformation relating to the conflict.

=== Media censorship ===
Media censorship and restrictions on communication have been recurring issues in Jammu and Kashmir. Journalists, media organisations and press freedom groups have periodically raised concerns regarding newspaper bans, content restrictions, communication blackouts and regulatory measures affecting news coverage.

In 2016, newspaper publication was temporarily suspended in Kashmir for three days following unrest in the region.

In 2017, the Ministry of Electronics and Information Technology requested the blocking of certain content on Twitter under Section 69A of the Information Technology Act.

A 2017 report by the Press Council of India described journalists in Kashmir as operating in an environment shaped by pressure from both state and non-state actors. The report noted that journalists often faced accusations from opposing sides of the conflict regarding their reporting.

Following the revocation of Article 370 in 2019, several press freedom organisations raised concerns about communication restrictions and limitations on journalistic access in the region.

The Jammu and Kashmir Media Policy 2020 was criticised by media organisations and commentators who argued that some provisions could expand government influence over information flows and media regulation.

In August 2023, access to the independent news outlet The Kashmir Walla and its social media accounts was blocked, attracting criticism from press freedom organisations and international media groups.

In November 2024, legal threats issued against The Chenab Times over its reporting on the detention of an environmental activist drew criticism from press freedom organisations including the Committee to Protect Journalists and DIGIPUB News India Foundation. The incident received coverage in national media and became part of broader discussions regarding press freedom and digital journalism in Jammu and Kashmir.

=== Internet shutdowns and communication restrictions ===
Jammu and Kashmir has experienced some of the highest numbers of internet shutdowns in India. Communication restrictions have frequently been imposed during periods of political unrest, security operations and major political developments.

Following the revocation of Article 370 in 2019, internet services were suspended across the region. Journalists and media organisations faced significant challenges in reporting due to limited access to communication infrastructure and the establishment of government-operated media facilitation centres.

High-speed mobile internet services were restored across Jammu and Kashmir in February 2021 after prolonged restrictions.

=== Arrest of journalists ===
The arrest and detention of journalists in Jammu and Kashmir has been a recurring concern for press freedom organisations, particularly in relation to the use of security legislation such as the Unlawful Activities (Prevention) Act (UAPA) and the Public Safety Act (PSA). Several journalists have been detained, arrested or investigated in connection with their reporting on political and security-related developments in the region.

Kamran Yousuf, a freelance photojournalist, was arrested by the National Investigation Agency (NIA) in September 2017 and was released on bail in March 2018.

Among the most widely reported cases was that of Asif Sultan, assistant editor of Kashmir Narrator, who was arrested in 2018 and subsequently detained under both the UAPA and PSA.

Other journalists whose detentions attracted attention from domestic and international press freedom organisations include Qazi Shibli, editor of The Kashmiriyat; Sajad Gul, a reporter associated with The Kashmir Walla, whose detention under the PSA was later quashed by the High Court; and journalist and human rights activist Irfan Mehraj, who was arrested by the NIA in 2023 under charges including the UAPA.

Press freedom organisations including the Committee to Protect Journalists, Amnesty International and other advocacy groups have expressed concern over the detention of journalists in the region and the implications of such actions for freedom of expression and media independence.

=== Assaults on journalists ===
Journalists in Jammu and Kashmir have also reported instances of physical assault, intimidation and interference while covering protests, security operations and public events.

In March 2020, video journalists Qayoom Khan and Qisar Mir alleged that they were detained by police in Pulwama and temporarily deprived of their equipment while performing their professional duties.

In May 2020, journalist Umer Rashid and a colleague alleged that they were assaulted by police personnel in south Kashmir while returning from Srinagar. The incident was condemned by local journalist associations and civil society groups.

=== Books ===
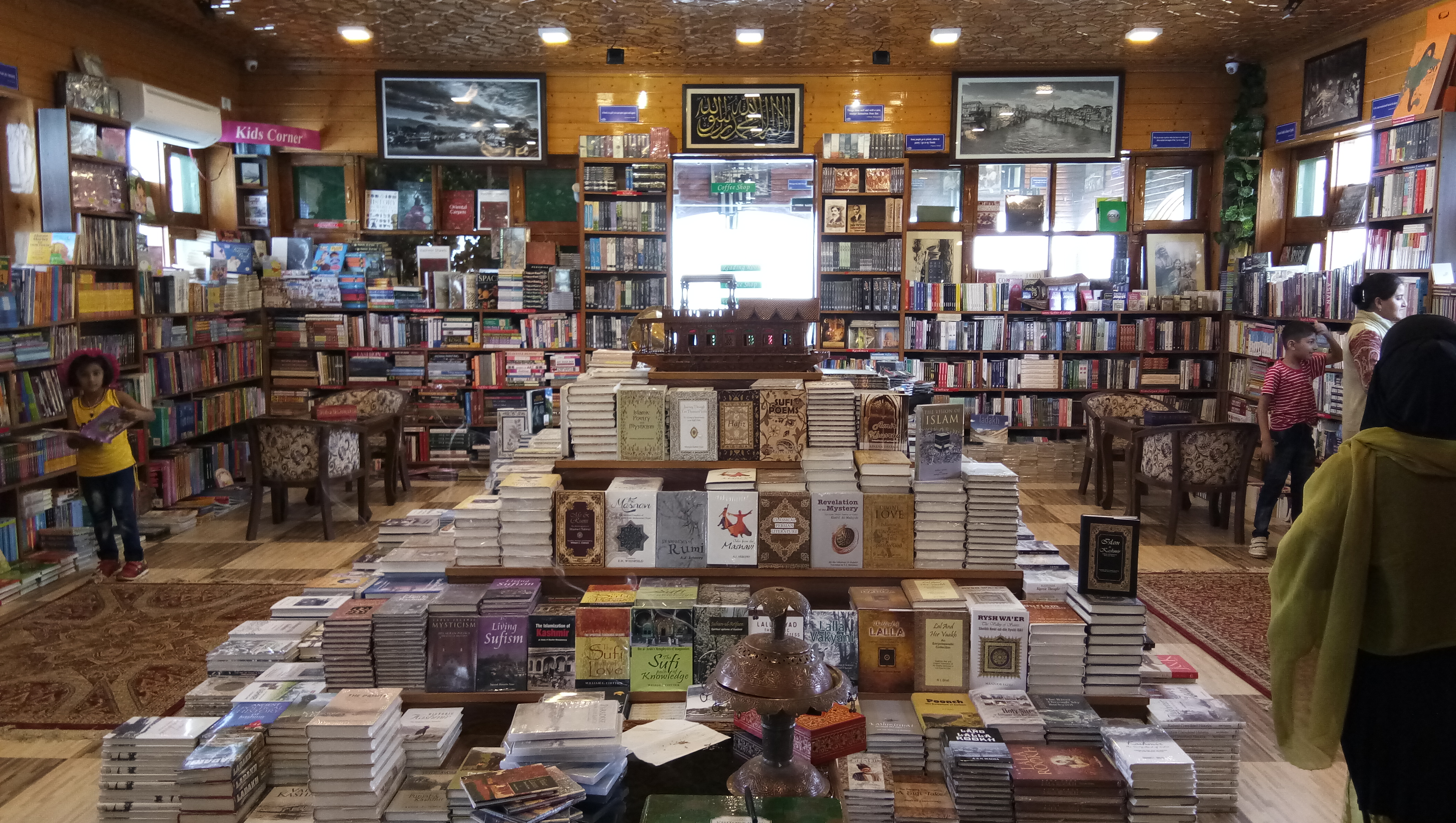
Gulshan Books cafe situated on the Dal Lake

Publishing and literary culture form an important component of the media landscape of Jammu and Kashmir. Writers, publishers and literary organisations have produced works documenting the region's history, politics, folklore, culture and social life.

Literary festivals and book-related cultural events are regularly organised in the region. Yayavar, held in the Jammu Division, is among the literary festivals dedicated to promoting reading, writing and cultural exchange.

Gulshan Books, located on Dal Lake in Srinagar, has been described as the only bookshop-library situated on a lake in Jammu and Kashmir.

Notable literary figures associated with Jammu and Kashmir include Mahjoor, Amin Kamil, Ghulam Nabi Gowhar, Shahnaz Bashir, Ghulam Nabi Firaq, Akhtar Mohiuddin, Jitendra Udhampuri and Champa Sharma.

=== Notable journalists ===
Jammu and Kashmir has produced a number of prominent journalists and media professionals whose work has influenced reporting on the region at local, national and international levels.

==== List of notable journalists ====
- Shujaat Bukhari
- Sajjad Haider
- Yusuf Jameel
- Altaf Qadri
- Nidhi Razdan
- Qazi Shibli
- Asif Sultan
- Masrat Zahra
