= Champa Sharma =

Dogri author

Prof. Champa Sharma is a noted Dogri author and poet known for her contributions to the promotion and preservation of Dogri language in Jammu and Kashmir as well as other Dogri speaking regions of Himachal Pradesh.

== Early life and education ==
Prof. Champa Sharma was born in Daghore, Samba District of Jammu and Kashmir in a Brahmin family. She has graduated in B.Ed. in 1962, M.A (Sanskrit) in 1964 and Ph.D (Sanskrit) in 1975 from University of Jammu. She has also graduated with M.A in Dogri language (Shiromani) in 1977. After teaching at a private college (Republic Academy) and later as an ad-hoc lecturer in Sanskrit at Government Women's College, Gandhi Nagar in 1969 in the initial part of her career, she taught at the Post Graduate Department of Sanskrit at University of Jammu in 1975 for a period of 5 years before joining Dogri Research Centre as a Senior Fellow and Director. While being associated with the Dogri Research Centre, Prof. Champa Sharma worked on securing a full-fledged Post Graduate Department status for Dogri language at University of Jammu and was appointed in 1983 as the first Head of Department of Dogri at University of Jammu.

== Literary career ==
Prof. Champa Sharma has authored 18 original works along with several translation works from languages ranging from Sanskrit to English and Hindi into Dogri. Many of her works have been translated into other languages namely English, Hindi, Punjabi, Santali, Manipuri, Kashmiri and Thai.

=== Original works ===
1. Dogri Kavya Charcha (1969)
2. Ik Jhaank (1976) - (essays on folk literature)
3. Duggar Dharti (1979) - (poetry)
4. Duggar Da Lok-Jivan (1985) - (folk-lore)
5. Anuvad Vigyan (Co-author) (1985)
6. Gurhe Dhundhle Chehare (1988) - (literary sketches in prose)
7. Kavya Shastra Te Dogri Kavya Sameeksha (1988) - (literary criticism)
8. Raghunath Singh Samyal (Monograph in Hindi)
9. Je Jeende Ji Surag Dikhana (1991) - (Dogri songs)
10. Jammu Ke Pramukh Parv-Teohar Aur Mele
11. Saak Sunna Preet Pittal (1996) - (short stories)
12. Shodh Prabandh
13. Nihaalap (2002) - (Dogri ghazals)
14. Cheten Di Rohl (2004) - (long Dogri poems)
15. Gadeerna (2007) - (Dogri poetry)
16. Prof. Ved Kumari Ghai (2011) (Monograph in Dogri)
17. Saanjh Bhyal - (Dogri poetry)
18. Soch Sadhana - (prose - analytical articles on literature)

=== Translations ===
1. From Sanskrit into Dorgi: "Katha Saritsagar" of Somdatt of Kashmir, Part-3 published by Jammu and Kashmir Academy of Art, Culture and Languages
2. From English into Dogri: "Duaari Kabootaren Di", novel named "The Flight of the Pigeons" written by Ruskin Bond, published by Sahitya Akademi, New Delhi.
3. From Hindi into Dogri: Ram Krishna Vachnamritsaar (in press)
4. From English into Dogri: "Swami Vivekanand Hundi Saral Jeevan Yatra te Unde Updesh", originally titled "Simple life of Swami Vivekananda and his teachings"
5. From Sanskrit into Dogri: Commentary of Acharya Mummat's "Kavyaprakash" completed under major research project of University Grants Commission (to be published)
6. From English into Dogri: "The Monk Who Sold His Ferrari" by Robin Sharma, published by Jammu and Kashmir Academy of Art, Culture and Languages with the title in Dogri "Sanyasi Jinn Apni Ferrari Bechi Ditti"

=== Books compiled and edited ===
1. Ajkani Dogri Kavita Part 2 published by Sahitya Akademi, New Delhi
2. Life & Works of Krishan Smailpuri published by Jammu and Kashmir Academy of Art, Culture and Languages
3. Hirkhi Tandaan published by Dogri Sanstha, Jammu
4. Bhasha Vigyan Te Dogri
5. Dogri Bal Geet published by Jammu and Kashmir Academy of Art, Culture and Languages in collaboration with CIIL, Mysore
6. Dogri Shodh - Vol. I, II, III, IV, V
7. Hindi - Dogri and Dogri - Hindi Dictionary of Synonyms (to be published)

== Awards and recognitions ==
She was awarded the Sahitya Akademi award by Sahitya Akademi, New Delhi for her original poetry work, "Cheten Di Rhol" in 2008. Other awards and recognitions include:

1. Diwanini Vidyawati Dogra Award, 1992
2. Bakshi Ghulam Mohammed Memorial Award, 1996
3. Dogri Sanstha Golden Jubilee Samman, 1995
4. Jammu and Kashmir Accession Golden Jubilee Award, 1997
5. NSS Award, 1995
6. Dogri Sahitya Rattan Award, 2000
7. Rashtriya Hindi Sevi Sahasrabdi Samman (Gold Medal & Certificate), 2000
8. Plaque of Honour by Jammu and Kashmir Academy of Art, Culture and Languages, 2001
9. Sadiq Memorial Award, 2008
10. Award of Honour by Post Graduate Department of Punjabi, University of Jammu, 2002
11. Kali Veer Memorial Trust Award, 2004
12. Jammu and Kashmir State Award, 2006
13. Dogra Rattan Award, 2006
14. Lifetime Achievement Award, Dogri Sanstha, 2012
15. Lifetime Achievement Award, MIER, Jammu

Prof. Champa Sharma has recently translated the best selling English book, The Monk Who Sold His Ferrari written by Robin Sharma in Dogri language. A book review of her Dogri translated work was published in the English daily newspaper published out of Jammu, The Daily Excelsior, authored by Sh. O.P Sharma on 21 August 2016

Prof. Champa Sharma was nominated in August 2017 to be the Dogri representative on the Central Committee of Jammu and Kashmir Academy of Arts, Culture and Languages.
