= Zafar Choudhary =

Indian journalist and author

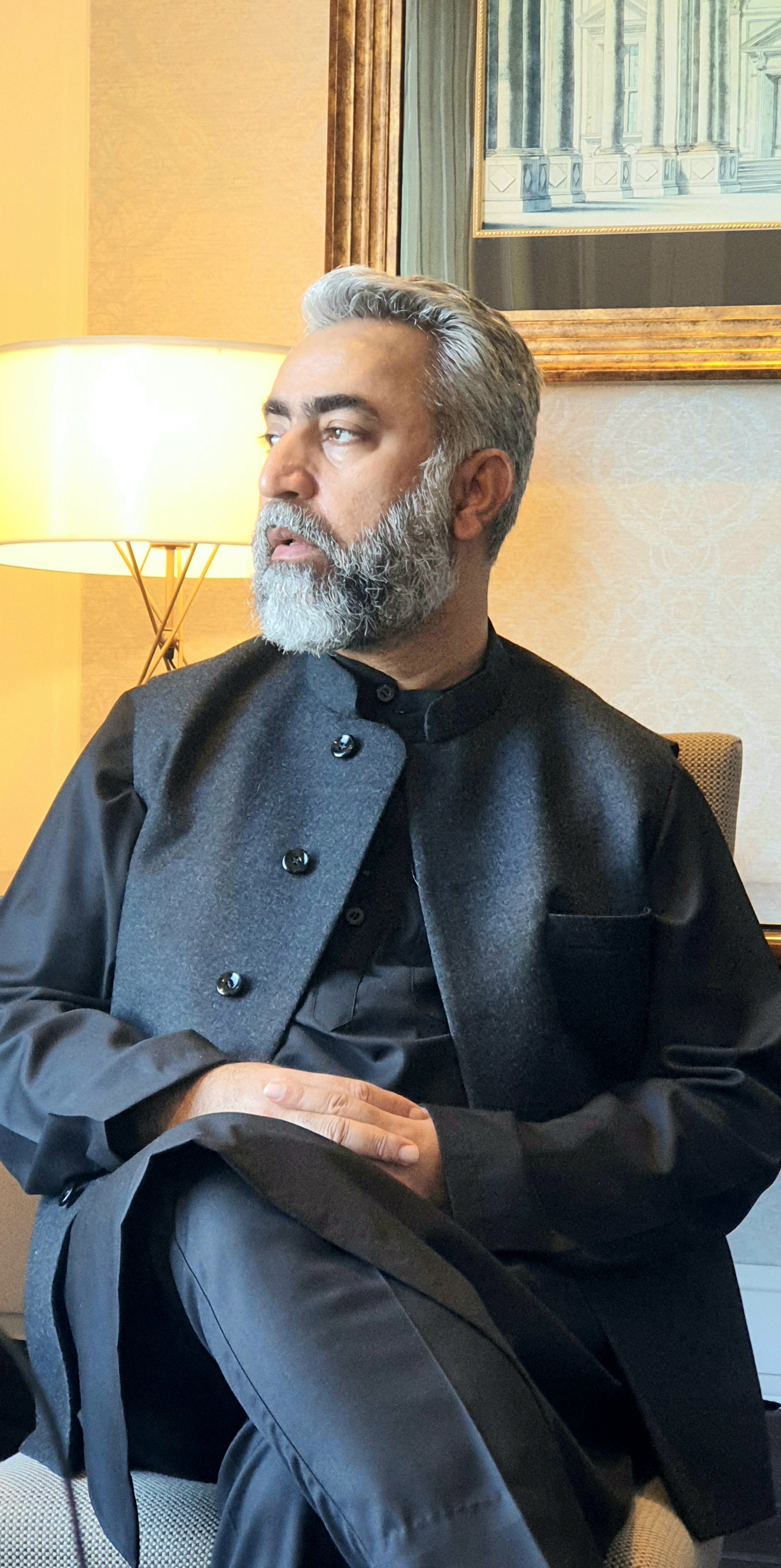
- Born: 9 February 1975 (age 51); Rajouri, Jammu and Kashmir, India
- Education: London School of Economics
- Occupation: Journalist
- Spouse: Irm Baig
- Relatives: Shahid Iqbal Choudhary (brother) Javaid Iqbal Choudhary, Senator (brother)
- Writing career
- Notable awards: Awarded by Jammu and Kashmir Government in 2017
- Website: www.thedispatch.in

Zafar Choudhary (Urdu: ظفر چودھری) is an Indian journalist, author, policy analyst, and practitioner of peace-building. He is the founding editor-in-chief of The Dispatch, an Indian online news, opinion, and analysis portal centered in Jammu & Kashmir. He received his education at the London School of Economics and Political Science and is an Asia Society Fellow (2012). He is a member of Editors Guild of India, a national organization of editors and journalists. He was born in the remote village Rehan in the district Rajouri, Jammu and Kashmir in 1975. An expert on Jammu and Kashmir affairs, Choudhary has been widely recognized and interviewed by the international and national press on Jammu and Kashmir affairs, India–Pakistan relations, national security and geopolitics.

== India–Pakistan Track II relations ==
Choudhary is a well-known figure in the India–Pakistan Track II dialogue, where he focuses on peacebuilding in Jammu and Kashmir. He has worked with Conciliation Resources (London) since 2008 on a comprehensive India–Pakistan initiatives to build peace in the region. He has collaborated closely with government officials, political and civil society actors on both sides of the Line of Control to establish institutes such as the Joint Chamber of Commerce and Industry and the Consortium of Vice-Chancellors, which draw members from both sides of the India-Pakistan divide in Kashmir. Zafar Choudhary is founder member of the Sulah Dialogue Process, a high level Track II dialogue initiative between India and Pakistan. Other members of the group include former chiefs of intelligence, military generals and diplomats -one each from Indian and Pakistani side

== Professional associations ==
Choudhary has also been associated with the Royal United Services Institute, United Kingdom Pugwash Conferences on Science and World Affairs, U.S. Institute of Peace, Berghof Foundation (Berlin), IPCS (Siem Reap, Cambodia), United Services Institute in New Delhi, the Institute of Peace and Conflict Studies in New Delhi, the WISCOMP in New Delhi and a number of other think tanks and universities in India and abroad and was a part of the deliberations going on the issue of Jammu and Kashmir.

== Career ==
He is the founding editor of Epilogue, a Jammu-based English news magazine published in India. Presently, he is editor in chief and the Founder of The Dispatch, an Indian online digital news service supplemented by channels on YouTube and Facebook to disseminate and distribute rich news content. He also writes occasionally for The Hindu, Rising Kashmir and other newspapers.

== Kashmir Conflict and Muslims of Jammu ==
Choudhary's book, titled Kashmir Conflict and Muslims of Jammu, (2015) addresses a historical gap in scholarship on Jammu and Kashmir. The story of the Muslims of Jammu, their political views, and their pro-India outlook, was not known before this book was published. In an interview to Daily O of the India Today group, Choudhary said, the Muslims of Jammu are lost in oblivion. Jammu and Kashmir's leading English daily newspaper Daily Excelsior termed the book a "masterly narrative of Kashmir conflict and identity profile of Jammu Muslims". The Friday Times of Lahore said "Zafar's book in itself is the first of its kind, as successive historians only made passing references to the Jammu massacre. Its launch kick-started a fresh debate around the subject". In an article titled "Of the 'Other' and 'Outsider', India's leading English daily The Hindu said, "Choudhary's is an important work which will, I hope, help in addressing the impressions of Muslims of Jammu division that they are taken for granted, that the government of India, and the world, seeking to bring to final resolution the conflicts that have plagued the state of J&K over the last century, seek primarily to determine simply the views of different sections of the community residents in Kashmir."

== Rewards and recognition ==
Choudhary won the State Award from the Government of Jammu and Kashmir in 2017 for his contribution in the field of journalism. He has also been awarded by a number of universities, NGOs for his outstanding work in the field of journalism and research.

== See also ==
- Shahid Iqbal Choudhary
- Shujaat Bukhari
- Muzamil Jaleel
- Javaid Rahi
