= Z. G. Muhammad =

Indian writer

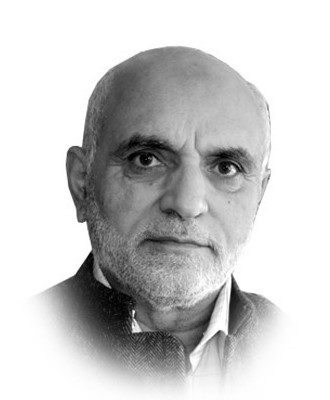
- Zahid G M
- Born: Zahid G Muhammad; Nowhatta, Jammu & Kashmir, India
- Education: Islamia High School
- Alma mater: Islamia College; IIMC Jammu
- Occupations: Writer and columninst
- Writing career
- Pen name: Zahid G Muhammad
- Period: 1946–present
- Genres: Political history, nostalgia

Z. G. Muhammad is an Indian author, writer and columnist based in Srinagar.

== Early life, writings and education ==
Zahid G. Muhammad was born in Nowhatta in the Srinagar district of Jammu and Kashmir, India into a Kashmiri Muslim family. After graduating from Islamia High School, he obtained a Bachelor of Science degree and a Master of Arts degree in English literature from the Islamia College of Science and Commerce of Kashmir University, followed by a course in mass communication from the Indian Institute of Mass Communication in Jammu. Currently, he is an editor of Peace Watch Kashmir, a journal dedicated to peace in South Asia, and was a regular columnist for Greater Kashmir, Srinagar till 2019.

The author has contributed articles on politics literature, culture, and history in various newspapers like; The Statesman, the Onlooker, Bombay, the Sunday Calcutta, The Free Press Journal, Kashmir Times, Journal of Peace Studies, New Delhi, The News, The Post, The Pakistan Observer, The Washington Post, Tehran Times, The Arab News, and the Urdu Times.

== As columnist ==
During 1982–1990, he wrote a weekly column for the Press Asia International, New Delhi, and reviewed books on Kashmir history, literature and politics.

Zahid worked as executive editor, for Kashmir Observer between 1997 and 2004.

He contributed a permanent column Punchline on politics, culture and literature for the Greater Kashmir between 1988 and 1995. Also, he also wrote a permanent column, The Media-line on print and electronic media in the Greater Kashmir. Then later in March 2006, he resumed writing a weekly political column Punchline in the Greater Kashmir till 2019.

=== "Nostalgia" Column in Greater Kashmir ===
Zahid G. Muhammad is widely recognized for his prominent weekly column titled "Nostalgia," which was published in the Srinagar-based English daily newspaper Greater Kashmir. The column focused extensively on the sociopolitical history, cultural heritage, and collective memory of the Kashmir Valley, with a specific emphasis on Shaher-e-Khas (Downtown Srinagar).

The column was highly well received by readers and the region's literary community, frequently praised as a very good and vital contribution to preserving the oral and unwritten history of Kashmir. Critics and academics have noted that his articles successfully functioned as a time capsule, capturing the lost cultural heritage and political vibrancy of the city and vividly transporting readers down memory lane.

Zahid G Muhammad's extensive writings for the "Nostalgia" column eventually laid the groundwork for several of his published books. Selected works authored by Muhammad that draw heavily from these themes include:

- The Icons of Kashmir Identity (2007)
- Srinagar: My City, My Dreamland (2011)
- Srinagar: The City of Resistance and Culture: Story of Downtown Boy (2016)

Muhammad continuously wrote the column for many years, cementing his role as a local historian, before he stopped contributing to it in 2019.

Zahid G Muhammad wrote many short stories in Kashmiri and English. He also produced and wrote documentaries for Doordarshan Kashir.

Some prominent ones were:

- New tracts (a 5 episode documentary on economic treasures of Jammu and Kashmir).
- Unity is diversity (a ten-episode documentary on different ethnic groups of J&K).
- Reshi Tradition of Kashmir (six-episode documentary on the patron saint of Kashmir: Sheikh Noor-u-Din – Reshi tradition).
- 'Literary Legacy of Kashmir' (a six-episode documentary on the literary history of Kashmir).
- 'Hamare Sufi Shaer' (a ten episode documentary on Sufi Poets of Kashmir).
- Boatman of Kashmir (a two-episode documentary on the anthropological study of boatman of Kashmir for Doordarshan national network).
- Monuments of Kashmir (Documentary for Doordarshan National network in English).
- 'Nagama-Firdous' (a musical program).
- 'Poets of Kashmir' (From Mahjoor to Rehman Rahi) in 2001.
- Qaiser Mirza – Journalist with a difference (Documentary).

== Books ==
- Can National Conference Survive? 1978.
- The Cindering Chinars, a collection of English short stories on Kashmir Struggle For Freedom 1996.
- The Icons of Kashmir Identity Published By Gulshan Publishers 2007
- Kashmir in War and Diplomacy Published by Gulshan Publishers 2007.
- Living Uncertainties: Kashmir, Problem and People.
- Srinagar – My City My Dreamland.
- Kashmir Story – Hope & Despair.
- Kashmir Changing Shades.

== Awards ==
- 2012 29th Ahad Zargar Award for Contribution to the Heritage Literature of Kashmir.
- 2008 Gulshan Publication Award.
