= M. L. Kotru =

Indian journalist and editor of The Statesman

- Born: 1934; Srinagar, Jammu and Kashmir, India
- Died: 25 September 2025 (aged 90–91); Gurgaon, Haryana, India
- Occupations: Journalist, newspaper editor
- Known for: Editor of The Statesman, Delhi; Diplomatic Correspondent of The Statesman
- Awards: Watumull Award (1959)

M. L. Kotru (1934 – 25 September 2025) was an Indian journalist and newspaper editor. He was the editor of The Statesman in Delhi. He won the Watumull Award in 1959, presented by Prime Minister Jawaharlal Nehru.

== Career ==
Kotru was born in 1934 in Srinagar, Kashmir. He graduated from S. P. College, Srinagar, and moved to Delhi. He worked for Sunday Mail and ANI before joining The Statesman. At The Statesman, he was Diplomatic Correspondent for many years. He later became News Editor in Delhi, and in the mid-1980s he became the Delhi editor. He was also the India correspondent of The Sunday Times of London. He wrote for The Statesman until 2013, and for newspapers in Kashmir, including Daily Excelsior and Greater Kashmir. He was one of the oldest members of the Press Club of India, its 45th member. He served as its secretary-general and was elected its president.

== Books ==
Books by M. L. Kotru
Book	Details
The Kashmir Story	Published in 1994
Asia '72: Official Guide	Co-written with Benoy Sarkar

== Award ==
In 1959, he won the Watumull Award for his series "The Other Side" in The Statesman. Prime Minister Jawaharlal Nehru presented the award to him.

== Death ==
He died on 25 September 2025 at his home in Gurgaon, aged 91. Prime Minister Narendra Modi condoled his death, calling it an irreparable loss. The Press Club of India said he had mentored generations of journalists during a career of nearly six decades.
