= Faizan Arif =

Kashmiri weather forecaster

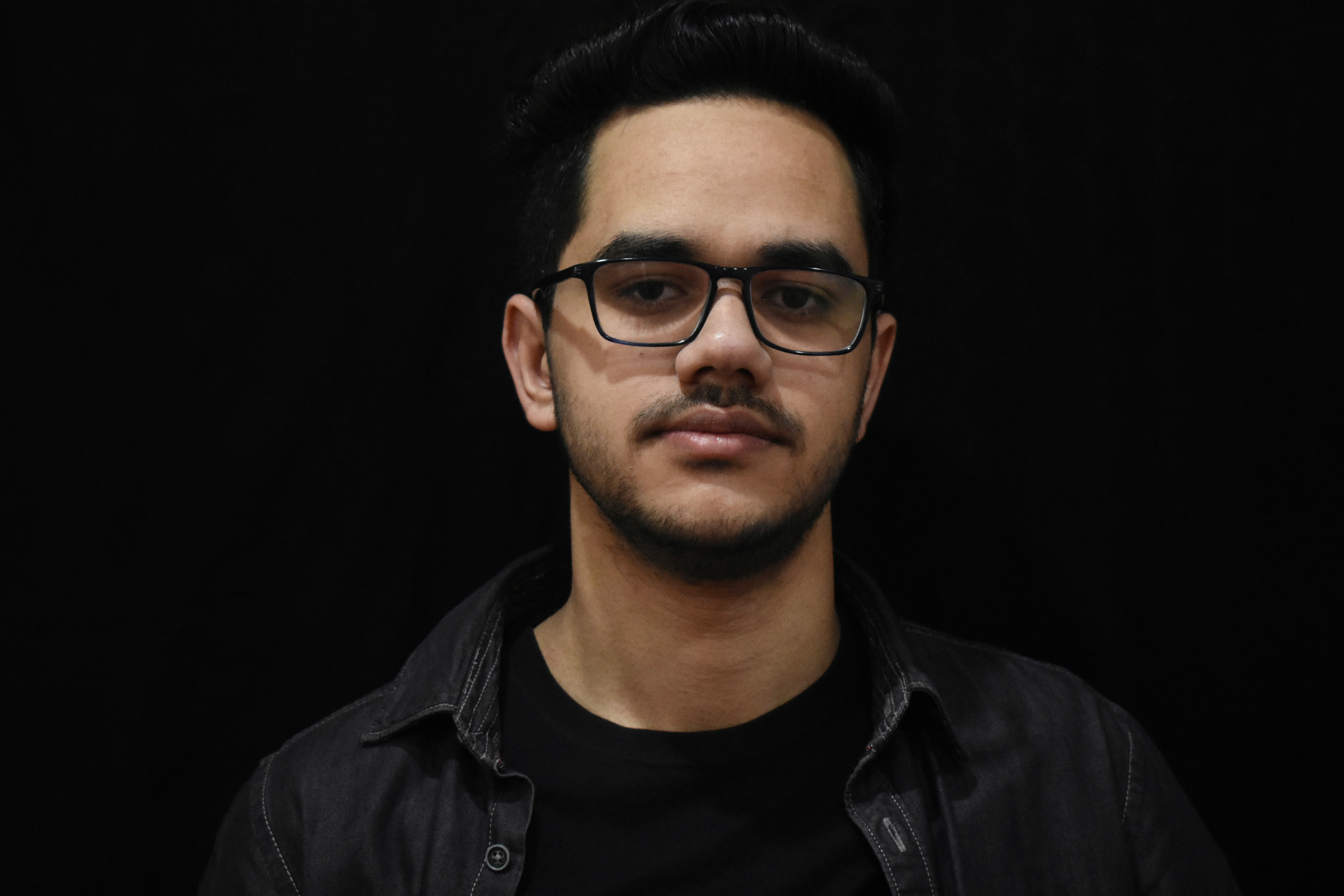

Personal details
- Born: 20 April 2001 (age 25) Srinagar, Jammu and Kashmir
- Relations: Misbah Arif Keng (Sibling)
- Parent(s): Arif Jeelani Keng; Muneera Tabasum
- Education: M.Sc. Applied Physics & Masters in Journalism and Mass Communication
- Alma mater: R.P. School Alamdar Colony, Green Valley Educational Institute, Amity University Uttar Pradesh
- Occupation: Student, Independent weather forecaster and analyst
- Website: https://twitter.com/Kashmir_Weather

Faizan Arif, professionally known through 'KASHMIR WEATHER' social media handles, is an independent weather forecaster and columnist based in Jammu and Kashmir (union territory), India. Widely recognized for his expertise, he provides weather services to media companies, agencies, and agricultural sectors. He has been interviewed by several radio stations, newspapers, and TV channels, including Hindustan Times, The Times of India, The Hindu, Zee News, and WION for his skills and work. He is a columnist for the Kashmir Observer, a prominent newspaper in Jammu and Kashmir, and writes for Outlook India. His views on weather & climate change have been quoted by BBC and Voice of America, the oldest and largest U.S.-funded international broadcaster.

== Life and career ==
Faizan is a weather forecaster from Srinagar, Jammu and Kashmir. He began his career in 2017 through an Instagram account where he provided weather forecasts. Since then, he expanded his reach to other social media platforms such as Twitter, Facebook, Telegram and YouTube. He completed his schooling up to the 10th class at R.P. School Alamdar Colony Srinagar, and pursued his higher secondary studies at Green Valley Educational Institute in Srinagar. He attained a Bachelor of Science (Honors) degree in Physics at the Amity University Uttar Pradesh. And later, completed an M.Sc. Applied Physics degree from the same University. Faizan gained recognition after being interviewed by various local Kashmiri newspapers such as The Kashmir Monitor, Greater Kashmir, Rising Kashmir, and Kashmir Life. He was subsequently interviewed by The Citizen, India's first independent online daily. After appearing on radio stations such as 95 fm Tadka, Red fm 93.5 and Radio Mirchi, Faizan's recognition increased, and he started receiving attention from national newspapers, portals, and news channels such as Hindustan Times, The Times of India, The Hindu, India Times, Zee News, Wion News, Good News Today and ETV Bharat. Faizan's weather forecasts mainly cover the Jammu and Kashmir regions and are published in various state newspapers and media groups. He has earned the nickname "weather spotter" of Kashmir for his accurate weather predictions, as recognized by Hindustan Times.

In November 2020, he released a long-range weather forecast for Jammu and Kashmir for winter 2020–2021, the first for the Union Territory. His weather analysis are being shared by Press Trust of India, The Indian Express, India TV, Live Hindustan, and other media houses. Besides BBC, The Third Pole, Voice of America, Mongabay, The Quint, and News9Live, he has been quoted in dozens of other publications. The World Meteorological Organization honored him with an honorable mention for its WMO 2022 calendar competition. At present, he works as a weather columnist for Kashmir Observer. He also writes articles for Outlook India on an occasional basis.
