= Shakeel Ahmad Bhat =

Kashmiri activist

- Born: c. 1979; Jammu and Kashmir, India
- Occupation: Kashmiri activist
- Known for: Muslim Rage Boy internet meme

Shakeel Ahmad Bhat is a Kashmiri activist and former militant who has become a minor internet celebrity. In 2007, close-up images of him participating in protests in Srinagar were published in various international media outlets and became the basis of an internet meme, with several bloggers popularly nicknaming him Islamic Rage Boy. He has been written about in newspapers including the Times of India, Middle East Times, France 24, and The Sunday Mail.

== Biography ==
Bhat was born into a Sufi Muslim family in Jammu and Kashmir, India, sometime in the late 1970s. His father was associated with Jammu and Kashmir Plebiscite Front. In interviews given to different news outlets, Bhat has alleged that his sister Sharifa died as a result of injuries sustained from violence by police during a police raid on his home. The year of the police raid and her death, her age, and the exact cause of her death are uncertain, with various versions in media. (Note: According to Patrick French, a British writer who interviewed him in 2007, his home was raided sometime following the beginning of the insurgency in Jammu and Kashmir, where his 18 year old sister was thrown out of a window. She broke her spine as a result and died four years later at the age of 22. According to Free Press Kashmir, which interviewed him in 2021, his sister was thrown down a flight of stairs in 1986 when she was 12, becoming bed-ridden as a result, and died in 1992 at the age of 18. According to a 2011 Hindustan Times story, his sister died in 1994 after suffering a heart attack during a police raid at the age of 14.) Bhat dropped out of school as a teenager, and in 1991, at the age of 13, he joined a pro-Pakistan militant group called Al-Umar-Mujahideen, which he remained part of until his arrest in 1994. He was arrested and spent three years in prison, during which he was tortured and subjected to electric shocks. A nail was driven through his jaw. He remained under police surveillance after his release. An injury to his right arm as a result of the torture had left him unable to lift anything, and he has relied on his brothers to support him since then, saying he feels as if he is 110 years old. He lives in Srinagar, where he began participating in demonstrations in 1997. Due to his angry look, he was often photographed by journalists. He took part in protests against the Indian Army, Israel, Pope Benedict XVI, Salman Rushdie, and the cartoons caricaturing Muhammad.

Speaking to The Guardian about his photograph becoming viral on the internet, he said:

I am not happy with people joking about me or making me into a cartoon, but I have more important things to think about. My protests are for those Muslims who cannot go out onto the streets to cry out against injustice. This is my duty and I believe Allah has decided this for me.

According to Free Press Kashmir, by 2021 he had "intermittently spent 24 years and 4 months" in different prisons across India and had 276 FIRs against him. He married in 2020.

== In popular culture ==
He was featured in numerous blogs and articles by Christopher Hitchens, Kathleen Parker, Michelle Malkin, and others. On various blogs, he was photoshopped as Aerosmith singer Steven Tyler or as an opera singer. His picture has also been printed on T-shirts, posters, mouse pads, and beer mugs.

== See also ==
- Islam
- List of Internet phenomena
