= Early Times (disambiguation) =

Early Times is a brand of whiskey produced by the Sazerac company.

Early Times may also refer to:

- Early Times (newspaper), Indian English-language daily newspaper published from Jammu in the Indian union territory of Jammu and Kashmir
- Early Tymes, compilation album consisting of demos by Harry Nilsson
