= Ghulam Rasool Nazki =

Kashmiri poet, writer, broadcaster

- میر غلام رسول نازکی
- Mir Ghulam Rasool Nazki
- Born: Mir Ghulam Rasool Nazki; March 16, 1910; Jammu and Kashmir princely state, British India
- Died: April 16, 1998 (aged 88); Jammu and Kashmir, India
- Resting place: Malkha Cemetery, Srinagar
- Education: Islamia College of Science and Commerce, Srinagar
- Occupations: Poet; Writer; Broadcaster; Teacher
- Children: Farooq Nazki; Bilal Nazki; Ayaz Rasool Nazki
- Writing career
- Language: Urdu, Persian, Arabic, Kashmiri
- Genres: Rubaʿi; Gazal; Satire
- Subjects: Aesthetics, Spiritualism, Ethics
- Notable awards: Sahitya Akademi Award

Mir Ghulam Rasool Nazki (16 March 1910 – 16 April 1998), also spelled Meer Ghulam Rasul Naazki, was a Kashmiri poet, writer, broadcaster, and teacher. He wrote books, including poetry in regional and foreign languages such as Urdu, Persian, Arabic and later work in Kashmiri language. The recipient of Sahitya Akademi Award for Awaz-e-dost, a Kashmiri poetry, he is also credited as the "first Kashmiri writer" to write in Rupublic of India after independence, and the first poet to resuscitate quatrain poetic form in Kashmiri literature, which originally began during the period of thirteen and fourteenth century poets such as Lal Ded and Nund Reshi.

He wrote poetry on various subjects and in poetic genres such as rubaʿi, spiritualism, moral philosophy, gazals, aesthetics and in satirical genre.

== Early life and education ==
He was born to Mir Ghulam Mustafa on 16 March 1910 in a spiritualism family. He received his initial schooling from his father Mir Ghulam Mustafa. At early age, he completed traditional education in religious texts, Persian and in Arabic, and later completed his intermediate schooling from a school at Bandipore. He later did his matriculation from the Islamia College of Science and Commerce, Srinagar.

After completing his education, he was appointed as a language teacher at a primary school in Kupwara district when he was sixteen. After serving in education department, he joined Radio Kashmir Jammu in 1948 as an announcer, and later joined the All India Radio until he retired from radio broadcasting service in 1966.

== Literary career ==
He began writing around 1928 while serving as a teacher at Kupwara district. The first Urdu classical poetry he came across was Aab-e hayat by Muhammad Husain Azad, and later he started writing verse poetic compositions in Urdu language which was first published in Urdu magazines such as Kaleem and Adb-e-Lateef, 1930s literary magazines edited by Josh Malihabadi and other literary figures of that time. His poetry titled Ek Andhi Ladki Ki Dua is recognized one of the prominent writings in Jammu and Kashmir.

He wrote his first volume of Urdu poetry titled Deedai Tar in 1948, leading him to become the first writer of Kashmir to write after independence. He later wrote Chirageraah and Mataifaqeer Urdu poetries. He also wrote a book on Gani Kashmiri's verses and a monograph on Dinanath Nadim, 9th century's Kashmiri poet. In the later years, he wrote poetry in Kashmiri language, including Nimrudnama, Awaze Dost and Kaweyenewol.

== Awards and accordion ==
In 1987, he became the recipient of Sahitya Akademi Award, a literary honour in India, for his poetry titled Awaz-e-dost. He, according to Mohammad Yousuf Taing was referred to as "Jamiulkamalat". (Note: It translates as "the multidimensional achiever")

== Death ==
Nazki was suffering from colorectal cancer, and was asked to for medical treatment. He refused to treat his disease and died on 16 April 1998 in Srinagar, Jammu and Kashmir. He is buried in Malkha Cemetery near Kathi Darwaza in Srinagar.
