= Kamran Yousuf =

Kashmiri Journalist

- Born: 26 January 1995; Pulwama, Jammu and Kashmir, India
- Occupation: Multimedia journalist

Kamran Yusuf, also known as Kamran Yousuf (born 26 January 1995) is a Kashmiri multimedia journalist. As of 2022, Kamran is a staffer at NewsClick. He also works as a freelance multimedia journalist for various international organisations. In 2017, he was booked under UAPA and lodged at Tihar Jail. Many organisations including Committee to Protect Journalists, the International Federation of Journalists, Amnesty International and more issued statements for his immediate release. He got bail after six months and was discharged from all the charges on 16 March 2022 by Delhi court.

He was arrested by the National Investigation Agency (NIA), India's federal anti-terror organisation, on 5 September 2017 and was released on bail on 14 March 2018 from Tihar Jail, New Delhi. His detention was questioned at a national level by various bodies such as the Press Council of India, the Kashmir Editors Guild and Kashmir Young Journalists Association as well at an international level by Committee to Protect Journalists, the International Federation of Journalists and Amnesty International which all issued statements for his immediate release.

== Career ==
Kamran has worked as a freelance photojournalist with Greater Kashmir, Kashmir valley's largest circulated English daily. His photographs have also featured in Kashmir Times and Kashmir Uzma. He has worked as a reporter and stringer for two Urdu television channels, Chandigarh-based channel Gulistan News and Hyderabad-based news channel Musnif TV. As of 2022, he is the staffer of NewsClick and also work as freelance photojournalist with various International media outlets.

== Arrest and controversy ==
The National Investigation Agency (NIA) first registered a case related to terror and terror funding in Jammu and Kashmir in May 2017 and the first raids and arrests soon followed. During the course of investigation the NIA teams conducted searches at various locations and seized incriminating documents and electronic devices. Hundreds of witnesses were questioned.

Freelance photojournalist Kamran Yousuf was detained without charge by the NIA in September 2017 and was booked by the agency on 18 January in a chargesheet. He was part of 11 others listed in the chargesheet which accused him being a "stone-pelter" and for -

"conspiring to wage war against the Government of India" by carrying out "terrorist and secessionist activities" in Jammu and Kashmir

The NIA chargesheet also accuses Kamran Yousuf of -

forming strategies and action plans to launch violent protests and communicate the same to the masses in the form of 'protest calendars' released through newspapers, social media and religious leaders, creating an atmosphere of terror and fear in the state of Jammu and Kashmir.

The NIA has also accused Kamran of neglecting his moral duty of covering the government's developmental programs such as skill-building workshops and blood donation drives. This is the first time the NIA has arrested people allegedly involved in stone-pelting incidents.

=== Timeline ===
- 4 September 2017 - Yousuf was at a makeshift office of local journalists in Pulwama town when he received a phone call from the local police station. Yousuf was kept there overnight and taken to Srinagar the next day.
- 5 September 2017 - He was arrested in Srinagar allegedly on the grounds of "stone-pelting" and "systematically circulating videos and photos of militants to incite youth".
- 6 September 2017 - A March 2017 report by Greater Kashmir mentioned "GK lensman Kamran Yusuf" being thrashed by security forces in Pulwama was edited to make it merely "photojournalist Kamran Yusuf". The report was taken down from the Greater Kashmir website after his arrest. This action caused sharp reactions from the journalist community in Kashmir. Junaid Bhat, Greater Kashmir's photographer in north Kashmir, publicly dissociated himself from the newspaper.
- 7 September 2017 - Journalists from South Kashmir held a protest demonstration. The protesting journalists carried banners of "Kamran Yusuf is a Journalist, not a stone pelter", and "Free Kamran Yousuf".
- 9 September 2017 - Kashmir TV Journalists Guild, Kashmir Journalist Core, Kashmir Video Journalists Association and Kashmir Press Photographers Association issued a joint statement requesting NIA to come clear on the charges for which Kamran Yusuf was charged.
- 11 September 2017 - Committee to Protect Journalists Deputy Executive Director Robert Mahoney from New York issues statement, "Authorities should immediately release Kamran Yousuf," and that "Indian authorities must stop trying to crush the independent press in the Jammu and Kashmir region." Union Home Minister Rajnath Singh also assured help in the case of photojournalist Kamran Yousuf arrested by National Investigation Agency (NIA).
- 12 September 2017 - Kashmir Editors Guild (KEG) expressed serious concern over the continuous detention of freelance photographer Kamran Yusuf.
- 13 September 2017 - The International Federation of Journalists (IFJ) releases demand of immediate release of the Kamran Yusuf.
- 14 September 2017 - Press Council of India issues statement "viewed the incident with concern and taken the suo-motu cognizance of the matter" and that the matter is prima facie concerned with the freedom of press in the country.
- 27 October 2017 - The Modi government's special envoy to Kashmir, Dineshwar Sharma met the family of incarcerated photojournalist Kamran Yousuf in Kashmir.
- 6 December 2017 - An NIA court extends the detention period of photojournalist Kamran Yusuf from 90 days to 180 days. The 90-day custody ended on 4 December. The court extended the judicial custody till 3 January 2018.
- 16 December 2017 - Kamran's case was discussed in the court in New Delhi. Kamran's lawyer argued that Kamran was in fact present at the places where stone pelting took place, as a journalist, and had submitted and pitched those photographs to organisations he freelanced for. Kamran's lawyer went on to present more than a hundred pictures taken by Kamran, on record before the court, to show that he was not only covering the stone pelting events, but also events including army, police and state government events and visits of foreign delegates. For some of these events he had been issued a 'media pass' as well.
- 18 January 2018 - In a fresh chargesheet Kamran Yusuf is listed as a "stone-pelter" and is accused of "conspiring to wage war against the Government of India" by carrying out "terrorist and secessionist activities" in Jammu and Kashmir.
- 19 January 2018 - Committee to Protect Journalists Asia Program Coordinator Steven Butler issues statement, "Kamran Yousuf has already unjustly spent four months in jail and should be released immediately."
- 26 January 2018 - Pakistani journalists organised a protest demonstration in Islamabad outside the National Press Club (NPC) for the immediate release of Kamran Yusuf who is in custody in Tihar Jail, Delhi.
- 16 February 2018 - Committee to Protect Journalists makes another statement to immediately drop charges against Kamran Yusuf and criticizes NIA for trying to define who and who is not a journalist.
- 24 February 2018 - People’s Democratic Party, Youth Wing President, Waheed Para appeals Chief Minister, Mehbooba Mufti for photojournalist, Kamran Yousuf’s amnesty under amnesty policy announced for youth endorsed by Government of India.
- 1 March 2018 - National Investigation Agency Court once again reserves its order on the bail plea of freelance photojournalist Kamran Yousuf. Additional Sessions Judge, Tarun Sherawat reserved the order for 7 March after hearing arguments from Yousuf’s side and that of the NIA.
- 7 March 2018 - The defence counsel, Warisha Farasat uses the Truecaller app to argue for the bail of the defendant, Kamran Yousuf, perhaps the first time the app has been cited in a bail hearing in court.
- 11 March 2018 - Chief Minister Mehbooba Mufti asks Home Minister Rajnath Singh to intervene into Kashmiri photojournalist Kamran Yousuf’s case so that his life isn’t ruined.
- 12 March 2018 - Kamran Yousuf granted bail. NIA has opposed the bail plea.
- 14 March 2018 - Kamran Yousuf released from Tihar Jail, New Delhi, on bail. NIA opposed bail.
- On 17 February 2020, a nocturnal raid took place by Jammu and Kashmir Police on Kamran Yousuf and police took Kamran into custody over the identification of a twitter user, Kamran Manzoor. Police were alleging that Yousuf was behind the Twitter account. But after failing to find any clue regarding the allegations against Yousuf, he was freed.
- 16 March 2022: The Delhi court discharged three people, including Kamran Yousuf, as the court said that the charges against them had insufficient evidence. CPJ welcomed the NIA court’s judgement for acquitting Yousuf.

== Personal life ==
Kamran Yusuf was born on 26 January 1994 in Pulwama, Kashmir. He is an alumnus of Government Degree College Pulwama. Kamran dropped out of college in 2014 and took to photojournalism, gradually becoming a well-known name within the journalist fraternity of not only Pulwama but across the Kashmir valley as well.

Kamran was just two years old when his parents separated, and his mother Rubeena Akhtar shifted into her father's house. Kamran's parents got divorced a couple of years later. Rubeena Akhtar took up work as a teacher-cum-clerk at a local private school Tahab village of Pulwama district to support her son and herself. Kamran Yusuf's grandfather, Mohammad Yousuf Ganai is a retired political science lecturer. Kamran's family has been associated with the Jamaat-e-Islami.

== See also ==
- Kashmir Conflict
- Freedom of the press
