= Who Will Cry When You Die =

1999 book by Robin Sharma

Who Will Cry When Your Die?
- Author: Robin Sharma
- Language: English
- Series: The Monk Who Sold His Ferrari
- Genre: personality development
- Published: 1999
- Publisher: JAICO BOOKS
- Website: www.robinsharma.com

Who Will Cry When You Die is a book written by the Canadian Indian writer Robin Sharma. The book was first published in 1999. This was the third book written by the author in the series The Monk Who Sold His Ferrari.

== Synopsis ==
The book is divided into four chapters. Each chapter offers solutions and suggestions to face some of the difficult problems of life and develop one's personality and personal skills. Some of the suggestions mentioned in this book are— carrying goal cards, learning from good movies, seeing a day as an entire life, learning how to walk, importance of planting trees etc.
