= The 5am Club =

2018 self-help book by Robin Sharma

The 5 am Club: Own Your Morning, Elevate Your Life
- Author: Robin Sharma
- Language: English
- Publisher: Harper Collins Publishers
- Publication date: December 4, 2018
- ISBN: 978-1-443-45663-0

The 5 AM Club: Own Your Morning, Elevate Your Life is a self-help book by Robin Sharma, a writer and motivational speaker. The book is a fictitious story about morning routine and its effect to change lives for the better. It follows the narrative of an artist and entrepreneur who bond with a billionaire who teaches them about his secret to success.

== Summary ==
The story presents a fictional narrative centered around three main characters: an entrepreneur facing burnout, an artist seeking creative rejuvenation, and a billionaire who guides them all through the story. The story unfolds as the billionaire, a student of a famed speaker known as the Spellbinder, invites the two protagonists to join him on a journey of personal transformation through a structured morning routine.

The book's central concept is that waking up at 5:00 A.M. can significantly enhance personal and professional outcomes, as well as giving club members the personal time they may not receive by waking up at the same time as others. The billionaire attributes his success to the early morning routine taught to him by the Spellbinder, emphasizing how the practice helped improve his creativity, energy levels, and productivity. The book introduces a time management method referred to as the "20/20/20 Formula," which divides the first hour of the day into three 20-minute segments: exercise, reflection, and learning.

The story is partly set in Mauritius. The narrative uses storytelling with life lessons and practical strategies aimed at fostering discipline, self-mastery, and peak performance. Although framed in a fictional format, The 5 AM Club conveys principles of time management, habit formation, and personal growth rooted in Sharma's broader teachings on leadership and self-development.

== Author ==
Robin Sharma is a Canadian writer, best known for his The Monk Who Sold His Ferrari book series. Sharma worked as a litigation lawyer until age 25, when he self-published MegaLiving (1994), a book on stress management and spirituality. He initially also self-published The Monk Who Sold His Ferrari, which was then picked up for wider distribution by HarperCollins. Sharma has published 12 other books, and founded the training company Sharma Leadership International.

== Publication ==
The book was published in December 4, 2018 by HarperCollins Publishers.
