= Shahid Iqbal Choudhary =

Indian Administrative Service officer from Jammu and Kashmir

- Shahid Iqbal receiving Prime Minister’s Award for Excellence in Public Administration from Prime Minister of India Narendra Modi

Commissioner/ Secretary to the Government,
- In office March 2021 – Present

Deputy Commissioner of Srinagar Government of Jammu and Kashmir
- In office February 2019 – March 2021

Personal details
- Born: 5 March 1981, Rajouri, Jammu & Kashmir India
- Relations: Dr Mehak Shahid (Wife), Shamim Akhter (Mother), Zafar Choudhary (Brother) Javaid Iqbal (politician) (Brother), Dr Shagufta Choudhary (Sister)
- Education: B.V.Sc & A.H; MSc Natural Resource Management
- Alma mater: Sher-e-Kashmir University of Agricultural Sciences and Technology of Jammu
- Occupation: Bureaucrat
- Known for: Work in the Administrative Service.
- Employer: Government of India
- Organization: Government of Jammu and Kashmir

Shahid Iqbal Choudhary is a 2009 batch Indian Administrative Service officer from Jammu and Kashmir cadre and the current Secretary/Commissioner, Youth Services and Sports Department, Jammu & Kashmir. He secured an All India Rank 51 in the UPSC's Civil Services Examination for the year 2008. Shahid was the first Muslim from Jammu region and first Gurjar from J&K to get into Indian Administrative Service as a direct recruit from IAS.

== Early life and education ==
Shahid Iqbal Choudhary was born into a Muslim Gujjar family in Rehan village, Rajouri, and completed his early schooling in his native village. He earned his B.V.Sc & AH degree from Jammu, followed by a Master's in Natural Resource Management from FRI Deemed University, Dehradun. In 2023, Dr. Choudhary studied Public Policy and Leadership at the University of Oxford, UK, and also completed an executive course in Environment and Sustainability at the London School of Economics. He is a distinguished World Bank Scholar and Fulbright Fellow.

== Career ==
Shahid did his graduation in B.V.Sc & A.H from Sher-e-Kashmir University of Agricultural Sciences and Technology of Jammu and post graduation in MSc Natural Resource Management from FRI University, Dehradhun. Soon after completing post graduation, he qualified for Indian Forest Service in 2005 and served as forest officer in Kashmir Valley. In the year of 2008 he appeared for UPSC and qualified with a rank of 51.Presently serving as Secretary to the Government, Youth Services and Sports Department, J&K Government. He also served as Secretary to the Government, Department of Science And Technology, J&K Government, Secretary, Department of Rural Development and Panchayati Raj (Local Self- Government)|Secretary, Tribal Affairs, J&K Government| CEO Mission Youth J&K| MD Skill Development | Livelihood initiatives, Jammu and Kashmir. He served as District Development Commissioner/District Magistrate (DM), Srinagar, Additional Secretary in Chief Minister Office J&K/ Director Information &PR and Managing Director J&K Tourism Development Corporation, DM Rajouri, DM Bandipora, DM Leh, DM Udhampur, DM Kathua, DM Reasi, Additional Secretary Planning & Development, Special Officer Relief & Reconstruction Leh and SDM Nowshera.

Dr Shahid is an international resource person on mobile indigenous people/ transhumance and migration. He is also a part of the Working Group for the International Year of Rangelands and Pastoralists, organized by the United Nations. He represented the government at Albania^^ (2021), Italy^^^ (2022) and Ethiopia ^^^^(2021) for collaboration of Migratory Indigenous People/ Pastoralists.

== Awards and recognition ==
Shahid Choudhary received the Prime Minister's Award for Excellence in Public Administration 2023 for his outstanding contribution as CEO Mission Youth in Kashmir and the Prime Minister's Award for his contribution "Project Rahat" in 2018 besides the following coveted recognitions:-

1. National Award for Best Electoral conduct from Election Commission of India
2. National Awards for e-Governance presented by Ministry of Personnel, Government of India
3. Prime Minister's Awards for Excellence in Public Administration 2015
4. National Award on women empowerment from Prime Minister Narendra Modi in the category "Enabling Girl Child Education" on International Women Day 2018.
5. National Award for exceptional contribution in Education sector - 2019.
