= Early Times (newspaper) =

English-language daily newspaper

- Front Page of Early Times (14 January 2022)
- Type: Daily newspaper
- Format: Broadsheet
- Owner: Manish Gupta
- Founder: Bansi Lal Gupta
- Editor: Munish Gupta
- Founded: July 24, 2002
- Language: English
- Headquarters: Jammu, Jammu and Kashmir, India
- City: Jammu
- Country: India
- RNI: JKENG/2002/7815
- Website: earlytimes.in epaper.earlytimes.in

Early Times is an English-language daily newspaper published from Jammu in the Indian union territory of Jammu and Kashmir. It was established on 24 July 2002. The newspaper maintains multiple editions covering districts such as Jammu, Srinagar, Leh, Anantnag, Baramulla, Udhampur, and Kargil.

Early Times is registered with the Registrar of Newspapers for India (RNI) under title code JKENG/2002/7815.

It has received government advertisements from the central government, and is listed among newspapers empanelled by the Department of Information and Public Relations, Jammu and Kashmir (via the PIB Jammu & Kashmir media list). The newspaper has been cited in legal proceedings and referenced by other regional and national outlets.

In 2016, the Directorate of School Education in Kashmir suspended two government teachers who had been moonlighting as journalists for Early Times, as part of a broader crackdown on civil servants working simultaneously in J&K's media organisations.

In 2018, Asif Iqbal Naik, a reporter with Early Times, published a report alleging custodial torture of a Kishtwar resident by police. Following publication, the police registered an FIR against Naik in May 2018. The Jammu and Kashmir High Court subsequently quashed the FIR, observing that the manner in which it was lodged reflected mala fide intent and described it as a "unique method of silencing the journalist" and an attack on press freedom. The court held that publishing a news item based on statements from identifiable sources does not constitute an offence.

In 2019, the Jammu and Kashmir Public Service Commission issued an official rejoinder in response to a report published by Early Times regarding the conduct of the KCS Mains examination, contesting the factual claims made in the newspaper's coverage.

In 2021, editor Manish Gupta testified before a Press Council of India fact-finding committee that government advertisements to Early Times were suspended for three days following its report that the J&K Shrine Board and its website had become non-functional. The PCI committee, formed on a complaint by former Chief Minister Mehbooba Mufti, found that the J&K Information Department had suspended advertisements to 26 publications in the Jammu region without ascribing reasons.

The DIPR itself conceded before the FFC that advertising had been withdrawn from Early Times on the basis of a recommendation by the Deputy Director Information (PR), Jammu, vide a letter dated 26 August 2021, following complaints registered of "harassment, abuse and torture" against the publication. Gupta further testified that Principal Secretary Niteshwar Kumar, who also served as Shrine Board CEO, was behind the drive to throttle the newspaper, and that the administration had faced discrimination in advertising for over a year, with pressure being exerted on newspapers not to cover issues such as early elections.

In October 2025, during a session of the Jammu and Kashmir Legislative Assembly, ruling National Conference MLA Tanvir Sadiq specifically named Early Times alongside Greater Kashmir and Kashmir Times as newspapers that had been denied government advertisements without stated reasons for six to seven years, describing the practice as a direct assault on press freedom. The debate saw members across party lines, including from the PDP and CPIM, call for a transparent media advertisement policy in J&K.
