= Islamia College of Science and Commerce, Srinagar =

College in Srinagar, Jammu & Kashmir

- Motto: Lead Kindly Light
- Type: State Autonomous College
- Established: 1961
- Chairman: LG of UT J&K Manoj Sinha
- Principal: Prof.(Dr.) Aijaz Ahmad Hakak
- Faculty: 80
- Students: 2520
- Undergraduates: 2400
- Postgraduates: 120
- Location: Srinagar, Jammu and Kashmir, India; 34°06′17″N 74°48′36″E
- Campus: Islamic architecture 12.17 acres (0.0493 km^{2}) Total: 12.17 acres (0.0493 km^{2})
- Language: Koshur, English, Urdu
- Nickname: Islamia College
- Website: www.islamiacollege.edu.in

The Islamia College of Science and Commerce, Srinagar (commonly referred to as Islamia College or ICSC) is a University Grants Commission Autonomous College, and accredited as A grade by National Assessment and Accreditation Council, in the state of Jammu and Kashmir, located on a 12.17-acre (0.0493 km^{2}) campus in Hawal Srinagar.

It is affiliated to University of Kashmir. It has the distinction to be the first college in Jammu and Kashmir to take the lead in incorporating the CBCS (choice based Credit system) from the year 2015.

== Establishment ==
The Government of Jammu and Kashmir established this Institute in 1961 during the Prime-ministership of Bakshi Ghulam Mohammad as an Autonomous Educational Institute.

== Courses ==
=== Under Graduate (UG) courses ===
- Bachelor of Computer Application BCA
- Bachelor of Business Administration (BBA)
- Bachelor of Commerce (Honours) B.Com
- Bachelor of Information Technology BSc IT
- Bachelor of Science (Medical) BSc
- Bachelor of Science (Non Medical) BSc
- Bachelor of Science (Bio-Technology) BSc
- Bachelor of Science (Bio-Chemistry) BSc
- Bachelor of Science (Electronics) BSc
- Bachelor of Arts (Economics) B.A.
- Bachelor of Science (Zoology) BSc
- Bachelor of Science (Nano-Science & Nano Technology) BSc
- Bachelor of Science (Botany) BSc
- Bachelor of Science (Chemistry) BSc

=== Post Graduate (PG) courses ===
- Master of Computer Applications MCA
- Master of Commerce MCom
- Master of Arts (English)
- Master of Business Administration MBA
- Master of Science (Botany). MSc
- Master of Science (Chemistry) MSc
- Master of Science (Zoology) MSc
- Mathematics MSc

=== Integrated Post Graduate (I-PG) courses ===
- Master of Science (Botany) MSc
- Master of Science (Chemistry) MSc
- Master of Science (Zoology) MSc

== Awards and achievements ==
The National Assessment and Accreditation Council, Bangalore (NAAC) has accredited the college at A level grade in its Certificate issued on 12 September 2017; the Institutional score being 3.27 CGPA, the highest rated college in J&K. It was accredited as the College for Potential Excellence by the University Grants Commission (India) in April 2010.

Adventures Activities

The college has also Mountaineering & Trekking Club which is affiliated with The Jammu & Kashmir Mountaineering and Trekking Association. The students of the college keenly participate in the activities held by the Club. The college adventure club is headed by Dr. Altaf Ur Rehman and Aga Syed Ashtar, Jasim Ali, Syed Kumail Madni were the leads of the Islamia College Mountaineering & Trekking Club.

== Notable alumni ==
- MC Kash - Rapper
- Ashiq Hussain Faktoo - Scholar
- Fareed Parbati - Indian Poet
- Z. G. Muhammad - Writer
- Ghulam Rasool Nazki - Poet
- Abrar Qazi - Indian Actor
