= Ashok Sodhi =

Indian photojournalist

- अशोक सोढ़ी
- Born: 21 September 1963; Jammu region
- Died: 11 May 2008 (aged 44); Samba district, Jammu and Kashmir, India
- Cause of death: Gunshot (killed in crossfire while covering an armed encounter)
- Occupation: Photojournalist
- Employer: Daily Excelsior
- Known for: Photojournalism covering conflict and events in Jammu & Kashmir
- Awards: Ashok Sodhi Memorial Photography Award (established in his memory)

Ashok Sodhi (21 September 1963 – 11 May 2008) was an Indian photojournalist who died in the line of duty in Jammu & Kashmir.

== Career ==
Ashok Sodhi worked as a senior photographer for the English-language daily newspaper Daily Excelsior in Jammu.

== Death ==
On 11 May 2008, during an armed encounter between militants and security forces in the Samba district of Jammu (near the Indo-Pakistan border), Sodhi was covering the scene when a bullet fired amid the gun-battle struck and killed him.

He is survived by his wife and a daughter.

== Legacy ==
In 2015, the Press Club of Jammu instituted the Ashok Sodhi Memorial Award for photography, to honour his memory and encourage professionalism among photojournalists in the region.
