= Ayaz Rasool Nazki =

Indian author (born 1951)

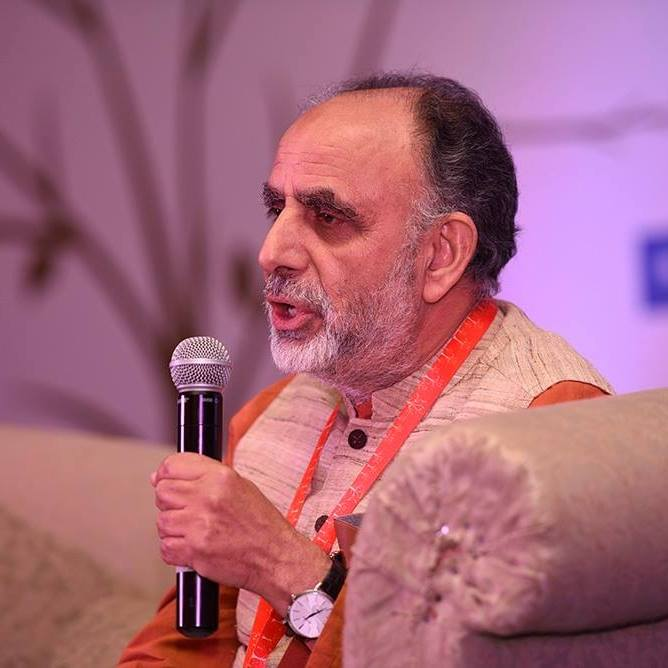
- Born: 19 May 1951 (age 75); Srinagar, Jammu and Kashmir
- Occupations: Educator, poet, writer, painter
- Parent: Ghulam Rasool Nazki (father)
- Writing career
- Language: Urdu, Persian, Arabic, Kashmiri

Ayaz Rasool Nazki (born 25 May 1951) is an Indian author, painter, and educator. He has written books in Kashmiri on poetry, prose, novel, and biographical account. He also writes in English and Urdu.

He is the former regional director of the Jammu & Kashmir chapter of the Indian Council for Cultural Relations.

Recently his new book 'Barf Pighalne Tak' translated from Urdu to Hindi, has been published by Rajmangal Prakashan, India.

== Life ==
Born in a Syed family of Jammu and Kashmir Ayaz Rasool Nazki's father, Ghulam Rasool Nazki was also a Kashmiri poet, writer, broadcaster, and teacher. He wrote books, including poetry in regional and foreign languages such as Urdu, Persian, Arabic and later work in Kashmiri language.

He is thought to be the first person from the Indian-administered Kashmir to have visited the Sharada Peeth.

== Awards ==
Nazki is the recipient of the Sadiq Memorial Award, 2004, Shiksha Ratna Award, 2003, Robe of Honour by Jammu University, 2008, Bakhshi Memorial Award 2017 for his literary contributions.

== Position held ==
Nazki was the founder Registrar of Baba Ghulam Shah Badshah University which is located in the border district of Rajouri, 150 Miles from Jammu the winter capital of Jammu and Kashmir. He also worked as Registrar, Sher-e-Kashmir University of Agricultural Sciences and Technology of Kashmir a national level agricultural university located in R S PURA, Jammu, Jammu and Kashmir, India
