= AIR Srinagar =

All India Radio Srinagar
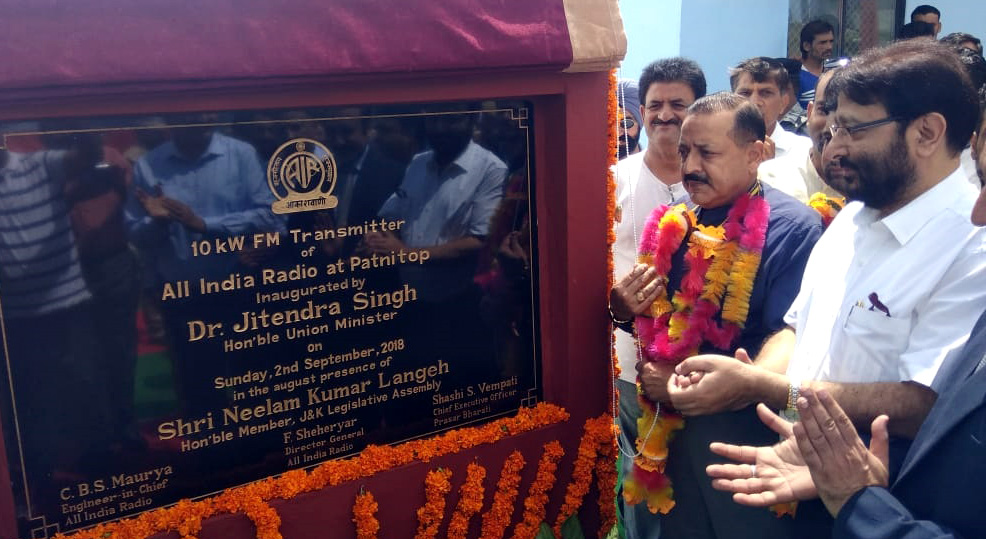
- Srinagar; India
- Broadcast area: India
- Frequencies: 1116 KHz MW; 102.6 MHz FM; 103.5 MHz FM
- Branding: AIR Srinagar

Programming
- Languages: Kashmiri; Urdu; Hindi

Ownership
- Owner: Prasar Bharati
- Operator: All India Radio
- Sister stations: AIR Jammu

History
- Former names: Radio Kashmir Srinagar

Technical information
- Transmitter coordinates: 34°04′22″N 74°49′46″E

Links
- Webcast: AIR Srinagar Live
- Website: allindiaradio.gov.in

All India Radio Srinagar (AIR Srinagar also cashed Akashvani Srinagar) is a public radio station operating in Srinagar, Jammu and Kashmir, India solely owned by Government of India's Public Service Broadcaster Prasar Bharati All India Radio Srinagar broadcasts in Kashmiri, Urdu and Hindi languages. Formerly known as Radio Kashmir Srinagar, it was renamed as AIR Srinagar following the Jammu and Kashmir Reorganisation Act, 2019. It is one of public stations in the union territory alongside AIR Jammu and AIR Leh. All India Radio Jammu broadcasts in Dogri, Urdu and Hindi.

== History ==
It was established on 1 July 1948 when Sheikh Abdullah, the then Prime Minister of Jammu and Kashmir, inaugurated the Radio Kashmir Srinagar station near the Tourist Reception Centre in Srinagar. Its broadcasting station is still located in Srinagar near Zero or Abdullah Bridge. J.N. Zutshi was the first Director General of Radio Kashmir. He was also the Secretary to Information & Broadcasting to J&K Government. Ghulam Mohi-ud-Din was the first head of the station. Radio Kashmir Srinagar became most popular when Pushkar Bhan's Zoon Dab was aired for more than nineteen years from the Radio Kashmir station, and became a usual medium of entertainment for the people who used to listen the Radio Kashmir 24/7.

== Crisis ==
After 1953 when Kashmir's political power began to change, observers say that Radio Kashmir Srinagar, shortly after its establishment, came under the control of All India Radio to counter the Radio Azad Kashmir. Observers also say that both these stations were used to counter programmes aired by each other. When the Azad Radio Kashmir used to air Zarb e qaleem, it was countered by Srinagar station's Jawabi hamla.

== Contribution ==
All India Radio Srinagar has contributed a lot towards the traditional music of Kashmir. It became home of people like Ghulam Hassan Sofi, who used to sing Kashmir's traditional songs which provided relief to the disturbed minds of Kashmiri people. All India Radio Srinagar also aired Kailash Mehra's collection which people liked most. Janbaaz Kishtwari (Ghulam Nabi Doolwal) was one of the noted artist who showed his talent through All India Radio Srinagar. Nowadays his daughter Jahan Ara Janbaz reaches her fans through All India Radio Srinagar. All India Radio Srinagar is believed to be the only medium which is broadcasting the audio of Kashmiri traditional songs, thus keeping Kashmiri musical tradition alive and contributing towards the Kashmiri society.

=== Floods of 2014 ===
During floods in Srinagar in September 2014 All India Radio Srinagar (then Radio Kashmir Srinagar) station was only medium of communication between flood affected victims and the then Chief Minister of State Omar Abdullah led government who also reached to affected through Radio Kashmir. Even after the flood wiped the Doordarshan Kendra Srinagar which led to wind up its broadcast, just next door to it, Radio Kashmir Station survived much more than any other radio or Internet service. Radio station in floods started Short Message Service so affected people could be rescued while its building was itself submerged. Finally the flood reached the first floor where in studios were affected and radio too closed its broadcast and announcer promised to restore the service as soon as possible. Later news and interaction programmes were aired from makeshift transmitting station on Shankaracharya Hill. RKS started a Helpline on 4 September 2014 when south kashmir started submerging. It was initiated and started by Mr Shamshad Kralawari, Head Commercial Broadcasting Service. Once RKS itself was under water the program staff climbed on to Shankracharya Hill and continued Helpline with bare minimum resources.

== News ==
Radio Kashmir's news section holds a responsibility whenever political crisis appear, or some other violences appeared during Kashmir conflict. Shehar Been is among top of the news program broadcast by Radio Kashmir Srinagar. However, at peak of militancy inside Kashmir, the officials and newscasters of sister department of Prasar Bharti newsroom reportedly received death threats so for some time news was aired from Delhi for Radio Kashmir, it was like this "ye radio kashmir hai ab ap sunye nayi delhi se khabrein".

== Religious contribution ==
AIR Srinagar also serves in the holy months of Muslims by producing such programs related to particular holy months like Muharram and for Ramadan. AIR Srinagar aired in 1980's the voice of Mirza Abdul Ghani Beigh, the prominent Kashmiri Noha reciter and writer. The audience belonging to Shia community thronged at public spots or wherever radios found, across the valley to wait for the programme of such religious Nauhakhan. AIR Srinagar broadcasts necessary announcements related to different sects living in Kashmir, including special updates for Shri Amarnathji Yatra.

== See also ==
- Radio Sharda
- AIR FM Gold
- BIG FM 92.7
- Red FM
- Vividh Bharati
- All India Radio
- DD Kashir
- DD Urdu
