= Bilal Nazki =

Indian judge

Justice Bilal Nazki
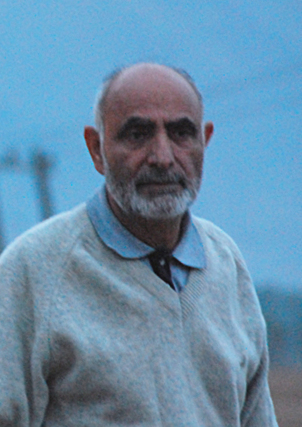

23rd Chief Justice of Odisha High Court
- In office 14 November 2009 – 17 November 2009
- Preceded by: B. S. Chauhan
- Succeeded by: Venkate Gopala Gowda

Personal details
- Born: Bilal Nazki; 18 November 1947 (age 78) Srinagar, Jammu and Kashmir, India
- Parent: Ghulam Rasool Nazki (father)

Justice Bilal Nazki (born 18 November 1947) is an Indian jurist. He is a former Chief Justice of Orissa High Court and served as a judge in the High Courts of Jammu & Kashmir, Andhra Pradesh and Bombay. He has also served as the Chairman of the Jammu & Kashmir State Human Rights Commission and the Human Rights Commission of Bihar. He also headed the committee set up by the Government of India to review the functioning of the Haj Committee of India and its state units.

== Career ==
Bilal Nazki was born on 18 November 1947 in Srinagar, Jammu and Kashmir, India into a Kashmiri Muslim family and was educated at the Aligarh Muslim University. He was one of eight children and his father, Ghulam Rasool Nazki — a broadcaster, poet and literary figure who won the Sahitya Akademi Award in 1987 — had moved from Bandipora to Srinagar in the year of Bilal's birth.

After graduation he joined the Bar in Srinagar and practised in various courts, while also spending some time as a lecturer of the Kashmir University. He worked as an advisor to the state government on various matters and was a member of the Delimitation Commission, which was concerned with electoral matters. Nazki was appointed Deputy Advocate-General of Jammu and Kashmir in 1986 and promoted to Advocate-General in January 1992. In 1991, while serving as an advocate and during a period of considerable instability in the state, he was kidnapped by an unidentified militant group but managed to escape his captors, who shot him five times as he did so. He ran 5 kilometres (3.1 mi) or 6 kilometres (3.7 mi) to a hospital.

He became an Additional Judge in the Jammu and Kashmir High Court in January 1995 and was made a Permanent Judge in December.

In October 1997 he was transferred to the High Court of Andhra Pradesh. While based there, he twice served as Acting Chief Justice — between April and November 2005, and November 2007 to January 2008. During his time in Andhra Pradesh he held various other posts while continuing to perform his duties in court:

- Twice President of the Andhra Pradesh State Judicial Academy
- Chairperson of the Andhra Pradesh High Court Legal Services Committee
- Chancellor of National Academy of Legal Studies & Research University (NALSAR), Hyderabad
- Twice the Enquiry Judge of Coal Mine Accidents
- Executive Chairman of Andhra Pradesh State Legal Services Authority.

Nazki moved to the Bombay High Court in January 2008. He moved from Bombay to become Chief Justice of Orissa High Court on 14 November 2009 and retired from there. In retirement, Nazki has commented on the nature of legal judgements, saying that "One [type] may be great for legal and academic purposes. There is another which may not lay down any theory but will wipe the tears of an aggrieved person." He placed his own actions in the latter group.
