= Sajjad Haider =

Kashmiri journalist (born 1966)

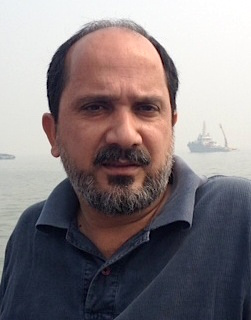
- Sajjad Haider
- Born: 21 October 1966 (age 59); Srinagar, Jammu and Kashmir, India
- Occupation: Journalist
- Known for: Editor-in-Chief Kashmir Observer Newspaper
- Relatives: Mustafa Hussain Ansari (Father); Masroor Abbas Ansari (cousin)

Sajjad Haider (Kashmiri: سجاد حيدرانصارى; born 1966) is an Indian journalist and media personality from Jammu and Kashmir who has been in the field of journalism since the 1990s. He is also publisher and editor-in-chief of the Kashmir Observer, a daily newspaper being published from Srinagar since 1996.

== Early life ==
Born in Srinagar on 21 October 1966, Haider studied engineering in Chennai, and subsequently studied journalism at Tehran University. During the 1990 Gulf War, he covered the conflict for various media outlets including the Tehran Times. He subsequently took up an assignment for National Iranian Radio and Television in New Delhi and moved back to Kashmir in 1994. He contributed to various international media organizations including BBC online, Deutsche Welle, IRNA and IRIB from Kashmir.

== Journalism in a Conflict Zone ==
In 1997 Sajjad Haider founded the daily Kashmir Observer of which he became the chief editor. Faced with a challenge to bring out a daily newspaper in the conflict ridden zone Sajjad Haider navigated through the difficult period overcoming the logistical nightmares and misplaced perceptions

== Awards and recognition ==
As an expert on South Asian and Middle Eastern affairs, he has been invited to global events including the ones organized by the Arab Thought Foundation in Dubai and the World Editors Forum in Gothenburg. His views have been aired internationally by Al-Jazeera, the BBC, CBC, the Voice of America and published extensively in international journals.

In 2006, Mr. Haider was awarded the prestigious Chevening Fellowship by Great Britain. He studied at the Centre for Security & Diplomacy, Birmingham University and undertook extensive study tour of various European institutions including NATO and EU Commissions in Belgium, Luxembourg and Ireland.

In 2014 Sajjad Haider joined Trans Asia News Service as editor-in-chief. Trans Asia News is the first news service from India that provides news and analysis from an Asian perspective to the world. Coverage area spans from Pacific to Mediterranean. However special interest areas remain countries straddling ancient Silk Route.

In 2017 Sajjad Haider was elected as vice president of Kashmir Editors Guild, a representative body of leading Kashmir based newspapers.

In 2018 Sajjad Haider was awarded Award for Excellence by Asian Arab Chamber of Commerce. The award citation mentions Haider's "outstanding contribution in building trust among Arab and Asian countries especially through platforms like Trans Asia News."

Sajjad Haider was unanimously elected as President of Kashmir Editors Guild (KEG) in 2020.

Haider articulated challenges faced by the Kashmir media in various interviews.
