= Qazi Shibli =

Kashmiri journalist

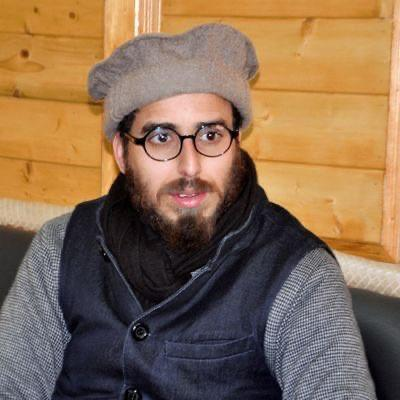
- Born: Anantnag, Jammu and Kashmir
- Occupation: Journalist
- Organization: The Kashmiriyat

Qazi Shibli is a Kashmiri journalist and editor of The Kashmiriyat, a digital newspaper covering general, political and human rights news from Jammu and Kashmir. In December 2019, Shibli's detainment ranked fifth on Time's list of "10 most urgent threats to press freedom."

== Early life ==
Qazi Shibli was born in Anantnag, Jammu and Kashmir, India.

== Work ==
Shibli began his career in 2018 and was pursuing his studies simultaneously at the University of Bangalore.

His work has been published in various international publications. His stories have been nominated for international awards. The Kashmiriyat, the online news website, he ran after having interned with several news outlets in Delhi and Bangalore has become a symbol of free press and has been voicing the ordinary Kashmiris when the space for media continues to shrink. Though The Kashmiriyat published a weekly newspaper, however, the lack of resources has stopped the public distribution of the same.

Broke the narrative on the eviction Drive Launched against the Indigenous Gujjar and Bakerwal Community with his video story. In Search of Home Questioned the fake Encounter in Shopian, One day after the Encounter in Amshipura Shopian, Kashmir on 18 July 2020.

Reported on the retribution faced by the Families of Militants in Kashmir.

Worked Intensively on the two siblings who went missing in Delhi and helped the families trace the duo from Kulgam Kashmir.

== Awards ==
Shibli won the annual Kamaran International Award for Journalism in 2022. He was nominated for the award in April by George Henton, a British journalist and documentary filmmaker, Asos Hardi, a Kurdish and Iraqi journalist, and Emily Garthwaite, a British journalist.

Shibli was also nominated in December 2022 for the Fetisov Journalism Award and in June 2023, he was declared a finalist among the top 15 journalists in the world by One Young World.

== Arrests ==
On 27 July 2019, he was arrested by Jammu and Kashmir police and held in custody at Saddar police station in Anantnag district. He was questioned about his article and subsequent ones on the deployment of new Indian troops in the region. Shibli was detained under the recently published Public Safety Act, which allowed the arrest of people older than sixteen years old for a period of two years. On 5 August, when a media shutdown in Jammu and Kashmir was imposed as a consequence of the abrogation of constitutional provisions granting special autonomy to Jammu and Kashmir, his family lost contact with Shibli. They only learned of his whereabouts only after more than 2 months in custody, when he had already been transferred to a prison in Uttar Pradesh. It was later revealed that Shibli was charged with accusations including "waging war against the Union of India," "creating fear and panic among common people," being "deeply involved in disrupting the peaceful atmosphere," and seeking "to motivate the people to work for seceding the state of Jammu and Kashmir from the union of India" on 8 August, leading to charges of pro-independence activity. On 9 August he was transferred to Bareilly District Prison in Uttar Pradesh, 1,300 km from his hometown. In December, Time reported on his case as one of the "10 Most Urgent Press Freedom Threats". The Committee to Protect Journalists, an international organization that defends journalists' rights, also reported on Shibli's arrest and campaigned online for the charges against him to be dropped. On 13 April 2020, he was released from prison and went back to his hometown of Anantnag in Kashmir.

On 30 July 2020, he was summoned by Jammu and Kashmir Cyber Police to appear the next day at Srinagar Police Station. On 31 July 2020, he was transferred to Shergarh Police Station. On 2 August 2020, people from across the world and from different backgrounds took to Twitter to condemn Shibli's detention. On 3 August 2020, he was transferred to Srinagar Central Prison. He has been booked under 107 CRPC, a section for Security for keeping the peace in other cases. After eighteen days, on 17 August, he was released.

On August 05, 2020, his house was raided for several hours and several gadgets were confiscated. The houses of his close relatives who live in the same town were also raided, as per CPJ.

In November 2022, his house was raided again by the State Investigating Agency of the Police.
