= Ghulam Hassan Sofi =

Indian singer (1932–2009)

Ghulam Hassan Sofi (1932, Srinagar - 2009, Srinagar) was a singer and harmonium player of traditional music of Kashmir, India.

Sofi began his career from Radio Kashmir, local station of All India Radio, in the early 1950s. He also sang for the station Doordarshan Kendra Srinagar, and for the Cultural Academy, besides being part of the staff in the Song and Drama Division from 1967 to 1994. Sofi, who also performed in other states of India, received the lifetime award from the Union Information Ministry and the Sheikh Mohammad Abdullah award from the State Government in 2006. Sofi sang the lyrics of the noted Kashmiri poets Ghulam Ahmad Mehjoor, Abdul Ahad Azad, Wahab Khar, Rasool Mir and Rajab Hamid. His own compositions often dwelt on spiritual and mystical themes.
