= The Chenab Times =

Indian news organization

- Formation: 2017; 9 years ago
- Founder: Anzer Ayoob
- Staff: 15-16 volunteers (2022)

The Chenab Times is an Indian news organization founded in 2017 by Anzer Ayoob.

== History ==
The Chenab Times was established as a news website in 2017 by Anzer Ayoob. It derives its name from the Chenab River that runs through the Chenab Valley. It initially published content in Urdu and English.

Since 2021, The Chenab Times has reported in the Bhaderwahi and Sarazi languages in addition to Urdu. According to Ayoob, "We started this initiative to preserve our languages because people have almost forgotten them." As of 2022, it was planning to expand into other languages, including Kishtwari and Pogali, and to publish a print edition.

In November 2024, The Chenab Times reported on the detention of civic and environmental activist Rehamatullah. The Jammu and Kashmir government threatened legal action against The Times for its reporting. The threat received condemnation from the Committee to Protect Journalists (CPJ) and the DIGIPUB News India Foundation. The Times defended its reporting.

In January 2025, The Chenab Times's Kashmiri X account was suspended. The Times subsequently filed a grievance with X.

In 2026, The Times was listed as an organization on the United Nations Office for Disaster Risk Reduction's (UNDRR) PreventionWeb platform, which catalogs organizations and knowledge related to disaster risk reduction.

== Operation ==
As of 2022, the website's news team consisted of 15 to 16 volunteers. The website primarily relies on advertising revenue to pay its volunteers. Its managing editor is photojournalist Raja Irfan. It primarily reports on developmental issues affecting the Chenab Valley. Ayoob has said the Times is heavily reliant on social media.
