= The Kashmiriyat =

News website

- Website type: News website
- Available in: English
- Headquarters: Jammu and Kashmir, India
- Area served: Worldwide
- Owner: Independent
- Founder: Qazi Shibli
- Editor: Qazi Shibli
- Website: thekashmiriyat.co.uk
- Launched: 2017
- Content license: Copyrighted content

The Kashmiriyat is an independent digital media organization based in the Kashmir Valley, headquartered in Anantnag, Jammu and Kashmir. It was founded by Qazi Shibli.

== History ==
The Kashmiriyat was started in September 2017 as an online media organization focused on journalism from Jammu and Kashmir.

In 2018, the outlet reported that its office had been attacked by unidentified persons. In 2019, its editor Shibli was arrested in connection with coverage related to the abrogation of Article 370 and Article 35A in Jammu and Kashmir.

=== Coverage ===
The Kashmiriyat primarily covers regional news from Jammu and Kashmir, including politics, education, social issues, human rights, and public affairs. The outlet also publishes opinion articles and stories related to Kashmiri society and culture.

Media monitoring platforms such as Ground News list The Kashmiriyat among Kashmir-based digital news sources, though they note that the outlet does not currently have a widely established media-bias or factuality rating.

In May 2025, reports by media organizations and press freedom groups stated that social media accounts associated with The Kashmiriyat were blocked in India following government orders issued during heightened tensions between India and Pakistan. The restrictions were reported alongside similar actions against several independent media outlets.
