= Kailash Mehra Sadhu =

Indian singer (born 1956)

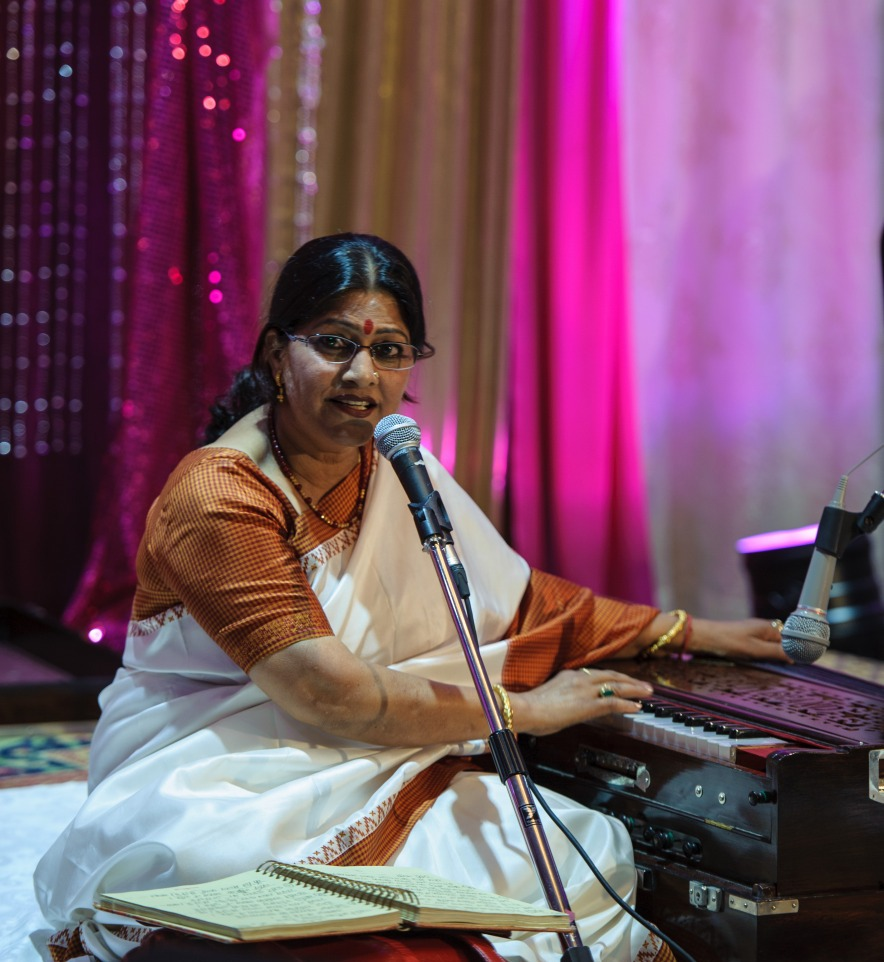
- Kailash Mehra Sadhu in Jammu & Kashmir, India
- Born: 1956 (age 69–70)

Kailash Mehra Sadhu (born 1950) is an Indian Kashmiri-language singer.

== Early life ==
Kailash Mehra Sadhu, also known as Malika-e-Ghazal, was born into a Dogra family in Nainital. She earned master's degrees from Panjab University, Chandigarh and Prayag Sangeet Samiti, Allahabad (1975), the latter degree focusing on vocal music. She became a music lecturer at the Women's College in Anantnag in 1979.

She earned fame singing Kashmiri ghazals and songs, and has recorded in Kashmiri, Urdu, Gujarati, Sanskrit, Punjabi, Hindi, Persian, Bhaderwahi, Pahari and the Kannada languages. Kailash participated in music competitions organised by the state cultural academy. Her stage performances were organised in Patna, Lucknow, Calcutta, Madras, Trivandrum, Hyderabad, Bangalore and Delhi.

Having married in 1980, she took part in the fourth Festival of Music organised by the Kashmiri Overseas Association of Britain in 1985. She also sang for the film Aarnimall.

She was given the title, Malika-e-Ghazal in 1993 by the Jammu Vikas Sanstha. The Sadiq memorial Committee awarded her the Mehboob Awami Funkara in 1981 and she was chosen the best singer by the Sri Bhat Smarak Samiti in 1980.

== Work after Kashmir conflict ==
Kailash Mehra Sadhu sang for the album 'Poozai Posh'. Alongside fellow Kashmiri singer Vijay Malla, and produced by the Kashmir Overseas Association of the United States of America, this album, containing several sacred bhajans and hymns native to Kashmir, and as a movement to preserve Kashmir's 5000-year-old culture, history and sanctity, this album became highly popular with the millions of Kashmiris in the diaspora worldwide.

== Works ==
Before the Kashmir conflict, Kailash Mehra Sadhu used to be a reasonably well-known singer known for her bhajans and hymns. These hymns gained popularity after the exodus of Kashmiri Pandits, after her collaboration with the Kashmir Overseas Association of the USA.
