= Radio Sharda =

- Jammu; India
- Broadcast area: India
- Frequency: 90.4 MHz

Programming
- Language: Kashmiri

Ownership
- Owner: Pir Panchal

Links
- Webcast: www.streamingthe.net/Radio-Sharda-90.4-Jammu-Kashmir/p/33701
- Website: www.radiosharda.com

Radio Sharda is an Indian FM owned by Pir Panchal headquartered at Jammu, Jammu and Kashmir, India.

== See also ==
- AIR Srinagar
