= The Kashmir Walla =

News portal in Jammu and Kashmir, India

- Website type: News and opinion website
- Available in: English
- Founder: Fahad Shah
- Website: thekashmirwalla.com
- Launched: 2009
- Current status: Blocked by Indian Government on 19 August 2023.

The Kashmir Walla was an Indian independent news and opinion website founded in 2009. The news website focused on providing news and analysis related to the region of Jammu and Kashmir. Fahad Shah was its first editor and was succeeded by Yashraj Sharma during whose tenure the website was blocked. As of August 2023, the website and all its social media handles remain blocked in India, while accessible in all other countries.

== History ==
The news portal was established in 2009 by Fahad Shah, with the aim of providing a platform for local voices to be heard and to report on issues relevant to the region. Over the years, it gained recognition for its independent journalism and coverage of events in Jammu and Kashmir.

Interim editor, Yashraj Sharma assumed the position after Fahad Shah was imprisoned in 2022. In a documentary about Kashmir Walla operating while conditions worsen for journalist, Sharma says, "It's strictly about press freedom. To try to save the free press."

In November 2023, Fahad Shah was released from prison after 21 months and resumed his role as The Kashmir Walla editor and continues to fight four legal cases against him in various courts. In July 2024, in an interview to The Quint Shah said, "I think, if you're truly a journalist, if there is a story and you have everything that qualifies as a proper piece in journalism, you’d still report it.” He has been barred from using social media and also not allowed to travel out of state as per the court orders.

== Blocking in August 2023 ==
In August 2023, The Kashmir Walla found its website, Facebook page, and X (formerly Twitter) account were blocked. The news portal received information from its server providers that the website had been taken down within India on the request of the central government. The Ministry of Electronics and Information Technology cited the Information Technology Act, 2000 as the legal basis for this action. The move led to the website becoming inaccessible to users within India, and its social media accounts were also rendered inaccessible.

This action come in the wake of a series of challenges faced by the news portal. Founder-editor Fahad Shah had been arrested in February 2022 over the coverage of a gunfight. The news portal's staff began encountering repeated harassment for an year till the website was blocked. The office was vacated by the outlet due to an eviction notice from the landlord on the next day of blockade.

=== Reaction ===
Critics have drawn a connection between the closure of The Kashmir Walla news portal and a broader pattern of press crackdown in union territory of Jammu and Kashmir. In the aftermath of New Delhi's decision to revoke the territory's partial autonomy and establish direct central rule in 2019, the region has witnessed a significant increase in incidents involving journalists. Dozens of journalists have been consistently summoned by the police and subjected to questioning about their work.

The blocking of 'The Kashmir Walla' was met with condemnation from various quarters. The Digipub News India Foundation criticized the central government's decision, labeling it as an attempt to intimidate Kashmiri journalists and further suppress free speech. Amnesty International also expressed concern, stating that the move was part of a pattern of repression against independent media in the region. Beh Lih Yi, the Asia program coordinator of the Committee to Protect Journalists, described the latest moves as a "new low for press freedom." In a statement to VOA, she further emphasized that the censorship was not only arbitrary but also shrouded in secrecy, highlighting the lack of transparency surrounding the decision-making process. The incident ignited concerns about the erosion of media independence and the broader implications for free speech in the region.
