= Kashmir Observer =

Indian newspaper

- Type: Daily newspaper
- Format: Broadsheet
- Editor: Sajjad Haider
- Founded: 1996
- Language: English
- Headquarters: Srinagar
- Website: kashmirobserver.net

Kashmir Observer is a daily English language newspaper published from Srinagar in Jammu and Kashmir since 1996. Sajjad Haider, a past president of Kashmir Editors Guild, is its editor-in-chief. Besides the print and online formats, its stories are republished by other media outlets.

== Controversies ==
Police raided offices of several newspapers in Srinagar including Kashmir Observer in 2016, and halted printing presses, confiscated printed papers due for delivery, and briefly detained printing and delivery staff.

Auqib Javed, a reporter with Kashmir Observer, was questioned by the National Investigation Agency (NIA) in 2018 in the Asiya Andrabi case.

Mushtaq Ahmed Ganai, a reporter for Kashmir Observer, was thrashed and arrested by the police when he was out for work during COVID lockdown in 2020.
