= Asif Sultan =

Journalist arrested in Kashmir

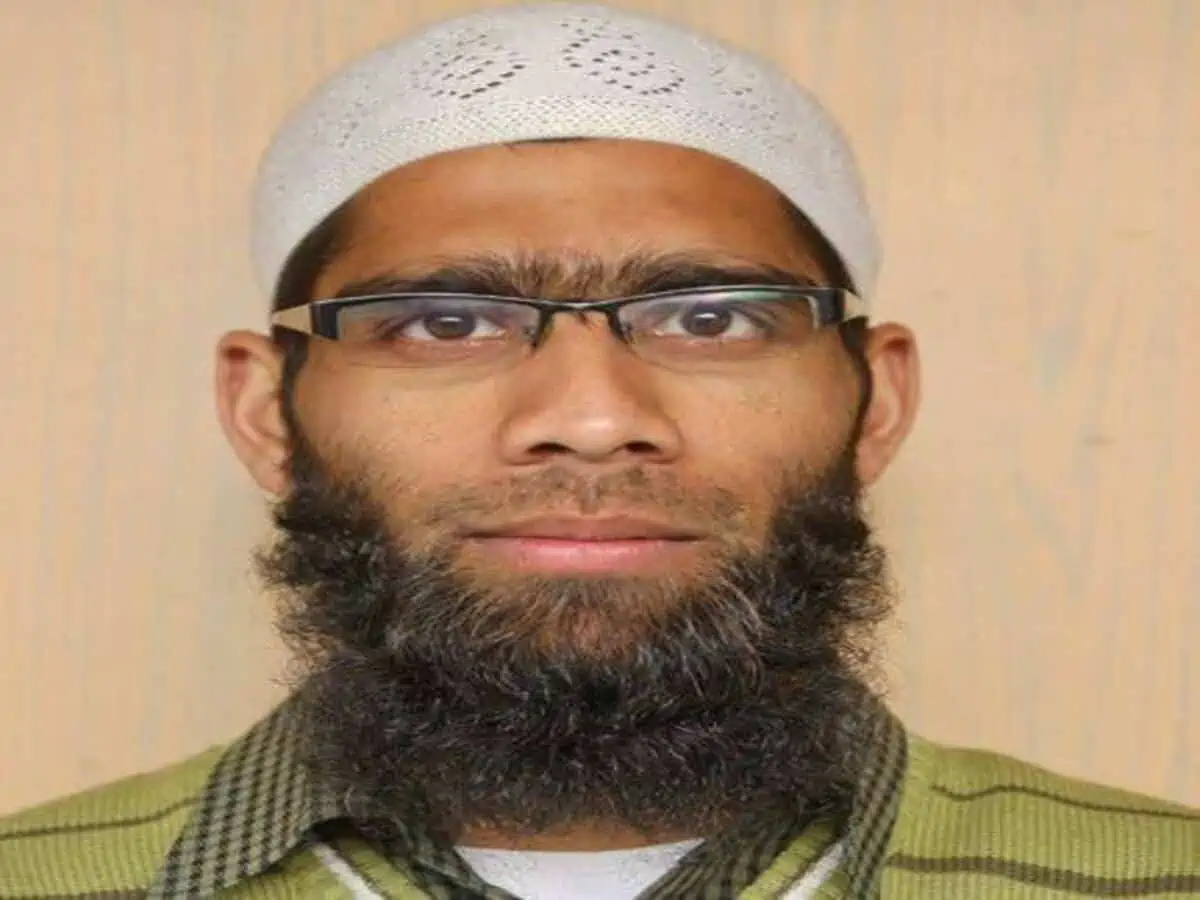
- Occupations: Journalist; Narrator
- Awards: John Aubuchon Press Freedom Award (2019)

Asif Sultan, also known as Aasif Sultan, is a Kashmiri journalist who has been jailed by India since August 2018. On October 17, 2019, Sultan received the annual John Aubuchon Press Freedom Award by the National Press Club of America. In April 2022, Aasif was granted bail but not released, instead he was re-arrested and booked under the Public Safety Act.

He was released in May 2024, after receiving bail on three occasions.

== History ==
Sultan worked as an assistant editor for the Srinagar-based monthly magazine Kashmir Narrator and covered politics and human rights. His work included reports on civil unrest in Kashmir, including interviewing alleged members of militant groups. He was arrested on 27 August 2018 under the stringent Unlawful Activities (Prevention) Act for allegedly providing support to militants. Sultan was repeatedly denied bail and his trial only began in June 2019.

Sultan published 'The rise of Burhan Wani', a profile of the Kashmiri militant Burhan Wani, who was killed in an encounter in 2016. The story has been linked to his framing in the case. His detention has been criticized internationally, with critics viewing it as a sign of "worsening conditions for the press and citizenry in Kashmir", with Committee to Protect Journalists and various other international organizations demanding his release. By the time of his eventual release in 2024, Sultan had spent a total of 2,010 days in incarceration.

In April 2022, Sultan was granted bail in the UAPA case, with the Jammu and Kashmir High Court noting that "investigative agencies failed to establish his links with any militant group". However, he was not released, and was re-arrested and booked under the Public Safety Act (PSA). In December 2023, the High Court quashed his detention under PSA, terming it "illegal and unsustainable".

Despite being granted bail, Sultan was kept in prison until being set free on 29 February 2024. He was re-arrested the very next day, in connection with a 2019 case. On 10 May, he was granted bail, with the judge noting that he was arrested "without any reason or rhyme…he is innocent and has not committed any offence of whatsoever in nature".

== Works ==
- Sultan, Sultan (1 July 2018). "The Rise of Burhan". Kashmir Narrator. No. June 2018. Srinagar. Archived from the original on 4 July 2018.

== Awards ==
- John Aubuchon Press Freedom Award (2019)
