= Robin Sharma =

Canadian self help writer (born 1965)

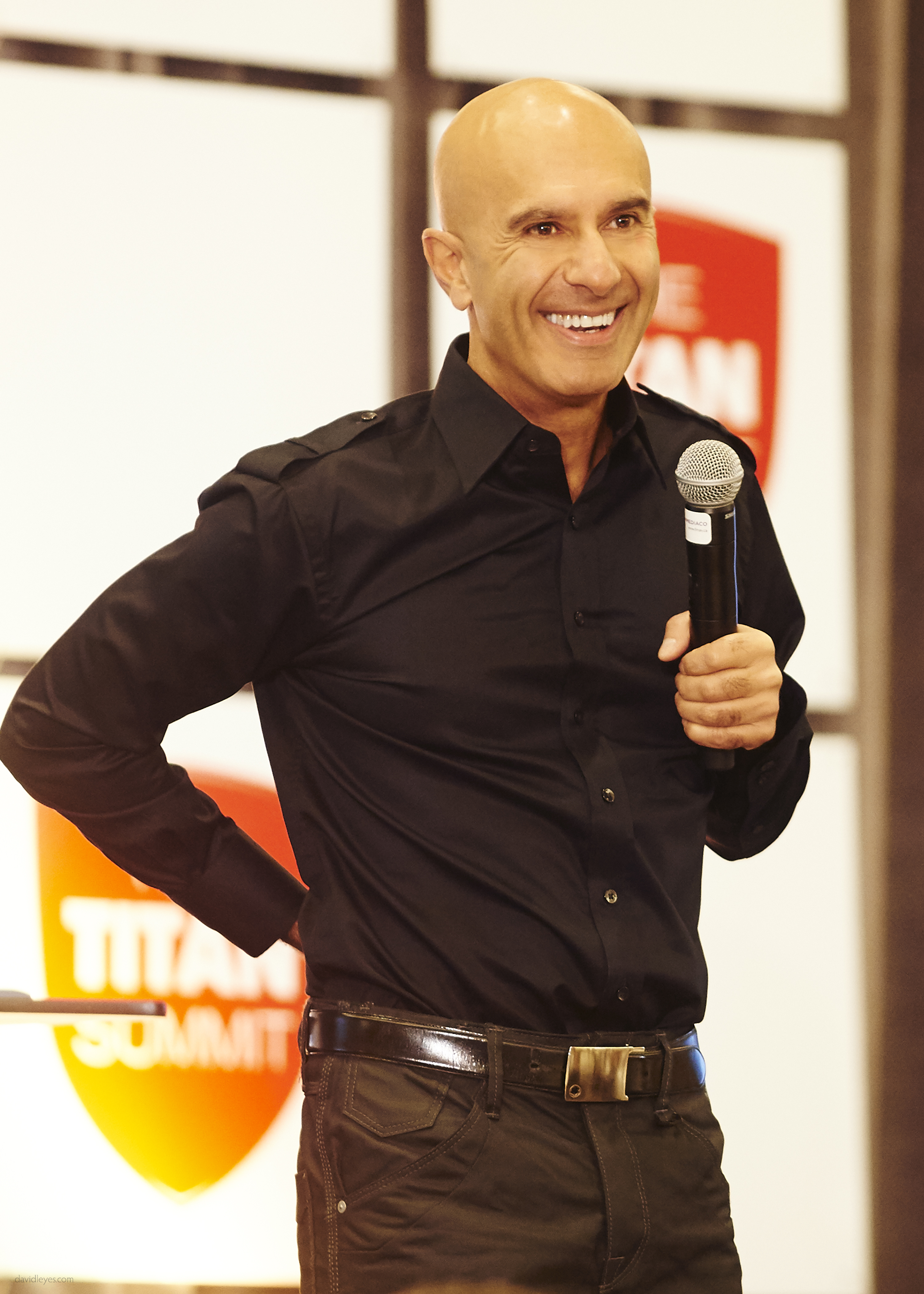
- Citizenship: Canadian
- Education: Dalhousie University; Schulich School of Law
- Occupations: Author, speaker
- Writing career
- Language: English
- Genre: Self-help/motivational
- Notable works: The Monk Who Sold His Ferrari, The Saint, the Surfer, and the CEO, Who Will Cry When You Die,The 5am Club
- Website: www.robinsharma.com

Robin Sharma is a Canadian writer, best known for his The Monk Who Sold His Ferrari book series. Sharma was a litigation lawyer when, at age 25, when he self-published MegaLiving (1994), a book on stress management and spirituality. He also initially self-published The Monk Who Sold His Ferrari, which was then picked up for wider distribution by HarperCollins. Sharma has published 12 other books, and founded the training company Sharma Leadership International.

== Early life and career ==
Sharma is of Indian Ugandan origin. He was born in Mbale, Uganda in 1965 and emigrated to Winnipeg when he was a one year old and raised in Port Hawkesbury, Nova Scotia. His father was a physician and his mother a teacher, he has one brother (who is now an ophthalmologist). He attended Dalhousie University studying biology with a minor in romantic poetry and then completed a Master's degree in law there as well. Initially, he worked as a lawyer for both a firm and then the Department of Justice in Ottawa, but he says he couldn't find satisfaction or peace in it.

Sharma started his writing career at the age of 25. He became widely known for his second book, The Monk Who Sold His Ferrari, self-published in 1997. After his second book became successful, he quit his career as a lawyer and became a full-time writer. His sixth book, The Saint, the Surfer, and the CEO: A Remarkable Story About Living Your Heart's Desires, was released on October 1, 2002. Publishers Weekly wrote that the book "lacks any narrative drive, the characters are thinly rendered and the dialogue is almost comically wooden".

== Selected publications ==
- Megaliving!: 30 Days to a Perfect Life (1994, ISBN 978-8172246143)
- The Monk Who Sold His Ferrari (1997, ISBN 978-8179-921623)
- Leadership Wisdom from the Monk Who Sold His Ferrari (1998, ISBN 978-1401905460)
- Who Will Cry When You Die: Life Lessons from the Monk Who Sold His Ferrari (1999, ISBN 978-8179922323)
- Family Wisdom from the Monk Who Sold His Ferrari (2001, ISBN 978-1401900144)
- The Saint, the Surfer, and the CEO (2002, ISBN 978-1401900168)
- The Greatness Guide: 101 Lessons for Making What's Good at Work and in Life Even Better (2006, ISBN 978-0061238574)
- The Greatness Guide Book 2: 101 More Insights to Get You to World Class (2008, ISBN 978-1554684038)
- The Leader Who Had No Title (2010, ISBN 978-1439109137)
- The Secret Letters of the Monk Who Sold His Ferrari (2011, ISBN 978-0007321117)
- Little Black Book for Stunning Success (2016, ISBN 9788184959895)
- The 5 AM Club (2018, ISBN 978-1443456623)
- The Everyday Hero Manifesto (2021, ISBN 9781443456647)
- The Wealth Money Can't Buy (2024, ISBN 9781846048296)
