= Free Press Kashmir =

Weekly English newspaper published in Srinagar, Jammu and Kashmir, India

- Type: Weekly newspaper
- Format: Tabloid
- Editor-in-chief: Qazi Zaid
- Founded: 2011
- Language: English
- Headquarters: Jehangir Chowk, Srinagar
- City: Srinagar
- Country: India
- Website: freepresskashmir.news

Free Press Kashmir is a weekly English newspaper printed and published in Srinagar, Jammu and Kashmir, India. The weekly newsprint is published in color at Rs. 15 per copy. The editor-in-chief is Qazi Zaid.

== History ==
Free Press Kashmir was founded by Sheikh Mushtaq in 2011, and in 2016 Qazi Zaid took over. The newspaper and its website were relaunched in May 2017.

== Internet blockade ==
In August 2019, Free Press Kashmir was shut due to the internet blockade imposed by the government, after the abrogation of Article 370. Free Press Kashmir's website relaunched in May 2020, on World Press Freedom Day, with a new domain name.
