= Shujaat Bukhari =

Kashmiri journalist (1968 – 2018)

- Born: 25 February 1968; Baramulla, Jammu and Kashmir, India
- Died: 14 June 2018 (aged 50); Srinagar, Jammu and Kashmir, India
- Cause of death: Assassination
- Education: Ateneo de Manila University
- Occupations: Editor, journalist

Shujaat Bukhari (25 February 1968 – 14 June 2018) was an Indian journalist from the former state of Jammu & Kashmir, and was the founding editor of Rising Kashmir, a Srinagar-based newspaper.

Bukhari was also the president of Adbee Markaz Kamraz, a cultural and literary organisation in Kashmir. He was instrumental in organising several Kashmir peace conferences and was part of the Track II diplomacy between India and Pakistan. Between 1997 and 2012 he was a correspondent for The Hindu in Srinagar.

He was shot dead outside his office in the Press Enclave area of Srinagar on 14 June 2018. He had survived three assassination attempts on previous occasions. Jammu and Kashmir Police identified and released the photos of suspects and held Lashkar-e-Taiba responsible for his killing.

== Education ==
Bukhari had done his Masters in Journalism from Ateneo de Manila University as a fellow of the Asian Centre for Journalism and was a recipient of the World Press Institute fellowship. He was also a fellow of the East–West Center, Hawaii.

== Death ==
According to Jammu and Kashmir DGP S. P. Vaid, three terrorists on a motorcycle attacked Bukhari around 19:00 as he was leaving his office and boarding his car.

His two Police bodyguards were also killed in the attack, one dying on the spot and the other later at the hospital, and a civilian was injured.

=== Investigation ===
On 14 June, Police released CCTV footage of suspects believed to be responsible for the killing – one with his face covered in a helmet, and the other two shrouded with masks on a motorcycle – and sought help of the public to identify them.

No one claimed responsibility for the killing. Peerzada Ashiq of The Hindu newspaper, for whom Bukhari earlier worked, blamed "unknown gunmen" for the killing, while ABP News blamed the killing on terrorists.

On 15 June, the police arrested a suspect. The suspect was identified as Zubair Qayoom, an OGW (Over Ground Worker) of Lashkar-e-Taiba (LET). He was seen in video footage snatching the pistol of security officer who was shot and being taken to hospital. According to one of the police officer investigating the attack, Zubair is a hard nut to crack and is giving tough time to the interrogators. Although he made disclosure about the weapon taken away from the crime spot during an interrogation, but being highly professional and guilty conscious he didn't disclose any clues about the conspiracy hatched with the militant ranks and meticulously planned terrorist act, Majid his friend from Bandipora who was accompanying him on the day of attack is absconding, he also is a former OGW and was arrested 3 years ago by security forces.

On 28 June 2018, Police released the list of four suspects namely Sheikh Sajjad Gul (based in Pakistan), Azad Ahmed Malik, Muzafar Ahmad Bhat and Naveed Jutt. They also stated that the plan to assassinate Bhukhari was hatched in Pakistan.

Naveed Jutt, the prime suspect in the assassination and a Pakistani national, was photographed on a motorcycle by CCTV cameras. Jutt was killed in an encounter by security forces on 28 November 2018, in the Budgam district, Jammu and Kashmir.

Azad Ahmad Malik, along with 5 other terrorists was killed in an encounter on 23 November.

Muzaffar Ahmed Bhat, along with 3 other terrorists was killed in an encounter on 15 March 2020.

== Reactions ==
Minister of Home Affairs Rajnath Singh termed the killing "an act of cowardice".

Pakistani militant group Lashkar-e-Taiba was quoted as having "strongly condemned" the killing and blaming it on the "enmity" of "Indian agencies" towards every individual who is "loyal to the freedom movement".

Reporters Without Borders was quoted saying that Shujaat Bukhari escaped a murder attempt by armed men in June 2006, at which time Bukhari had told Reporters Without Borders, "It is virtually impossible to know who are our enemies and who are our friends."

On 19 June 2018, after a two-day holiday on the eve of the Eid festival, major newspapers in Jammu and Kashmir "for the first time in decades" protested the killing of the journalist by leaving their editorial sections blank. Newspapers which joined this protest were Greater Kashmir, Kashmir Reader, Kashmir Observer, Rising Kashmir which had been edited by Bukhari till his killing, and Urdu newspapers including the Tamleel Irshad.

News-agency Press Trust of India reported that separatist leaders had called for a complete shutdown in Kashmir on 21 June 2018 to protest against the killing of Bukhari and civilians gunned down by security forces over recent days.

The Bharatiya Janata Party, India's ruling party at the federal level, which was sharing power with the local PDP in Jammu & Kashmir, withdrew support to the latter and cited the killing of Bukhari as one of the reasons. Incidentally, editor Bukhari's brother Syed Basharat Bukhari was the horticulture minister in the PDP-BJP former government headed by Mehbooba Mufti, which collapsed on 19 June 2018.

News reports said that besides Bukhari, some 18 other journalists had "been killed due to the conflict -- either directly targeted or caught in the cross-fire -- while several more have been injured."
