= Rising Kashmir =

English language newspaper published from Srinagar, Kashmir

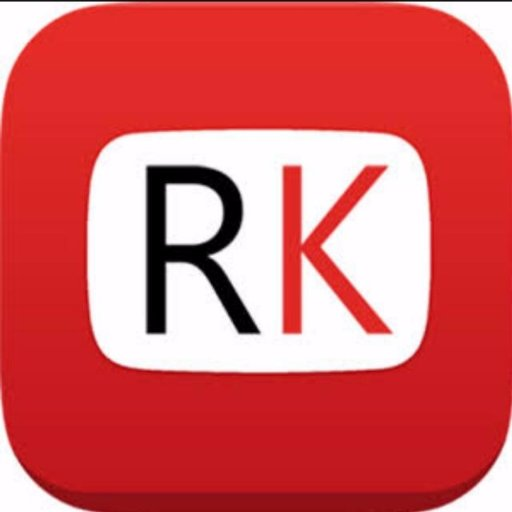
- Rising Kashmir Logo
- Type: Daily newspaper
- Format: Broadsheet
- Language: English
- Headquarters: Press Colony, Srinagar
- City: Srinagar
- Country: India
- Sister newspapers: Sangarmal, Buland Kashmir
- Website: risingkashmir.com

Rising Kashmir is a daily English newspaper printed and published in Srinagar, the summer capital of the Indian state of Jammu and Kashmir.

It was founded by Shujaat Bukhari in March 2008.

The newspaper has nurtured scores of reporters based in Kashmir, who now work in top news organisations around the world. It is one of the largest circulated dailies in Jammu and Kashmir. In November 2022, Five Journalists of Rising Kashmir resigned after Terrorist Threat.
