= The Monk Who Sold His Ferrari =

Book by Robin Sharma

- Author: Robin Sharma
- Language: English
- Published: HarperCollins
- Publication date: 1997
- Publication place: Canada
- Pages: 198 pages
- ISBN: 978-0062515674

The Monk Who Sold His Ferrari is a self-help book by Robin Sharma, a writer and motivational speaker. It was published in 1997 by HarperCollins. The book is a business fable derived from Sharma's personal experiences after leaving his career as a litigation lawyer at the age of 25.

== Publication ==
The Monk Who Sold His Ferrari was published in 1999 by Harper Collins Publishers and has sold more than three million copies as of 2013.

== Synopsis ==
The book develops around two characters, Julian Mantle and his best friend John, in the form of conversation. Julian narrates his spiritual experiences during a Himalayan journey which he undertook after selling his holiday home and red Ferrari.
