= Kashmir Times =

English language daily newspaper from Kashmir, India

- Type: Daily newspaper
- Format: Broadsheet
- Owner: Kashmir Times
- Founder: Ved Bhasin
- Publisher: Kashmir Times
- Founded: 1954 (as weekly); 1964 (converted to daily)
- Political alignment: National Conference
- Language: English
- Headquarters: Srinagar, J&K, India
- Circulation: 2,000,000
- Sister newspapers: Dainik Kashmir Times (Hindi edition); Jammu Prabhat (Dogri daily)
- Website: www.kashmirtimes.com

Kashmir Times is an Indian English-language daily newspaper published from the Indian union territory of Jammu and Kashmir. It was first published in 1954 as a weekly. In 1964 it was converted as a daily. This newspaper is the oldest and largest circulated newspaper of Jammu and Kashmir and it has a total subscription of two million it is worldwide also known as "Key to Kashmir affairs. Its founding editor, Ved Bhasin, reportedly upheld a belief in "secularism, justice and democracy" that made it popular in Kashmir division, despite originating from Jammu.

On 19 October 2020, the Srinagar Office of Kashmir Times was sealed by the Indian Government without any explanation. After the 2021-2022 print edition, the publication moved entirely online.

In November 2025, the State Investigation Agency of the Jammu & Kashmir Police raided the office of the Kashmir Times in Jammu for allegedly promoting anti-national activities. According to sources in the police, Ak-47 cartridges, pistol rounds and three grenade levers were recovered during the searches.
