= Daily Excelsior =

Indian newspaper

- Type: Daily newspaper
- Format: Print, online
- Owner: Excelsior
- Founder: S. D. Rohmetra
- Publisher: Daily Excelsior
- Editor: Kamal Rohmetra, Neeraj Rohmetra
- Founded: 1 January 1965; 61 years ago
- Language: English
- City: Jammu, Jammu and Kashmir
- Country: India
- Circulation: 3,75,000
- Website: www.dailyexcelsior.com
- Free online archives: epaper.dailyexcelsior.com

The Daily Excelsior is an English-language newspaper published in Jammu, a city in the Indian union territory of Jammu and Kashmir. It was established by S. D. Rohmetra. The newspaper has been in publication since 1 January 1965. Its current editors are Kamal Rohmetra and Neeraj Rohmetra. It is one of the most circulated English dailies in J&K.

== History ==
Started as a weekly English newspaper in 1965, it became a daily English newspaper in 1967.

=== Journalist death ===
On 11 May 2008, photojournalist Ashok Sodhi was killed while photographing an armed confrontation between terrorists and security forces in the Samba District of Jammu and Kashmir. He had moved closer to better capture coverage of the confrontation when a stray bullet hit him.

== See also ==
- Communications in India
- List of newspapers in India
- Media of India
