= Greater Kashmir =

English daily newspaper published from Srinagar

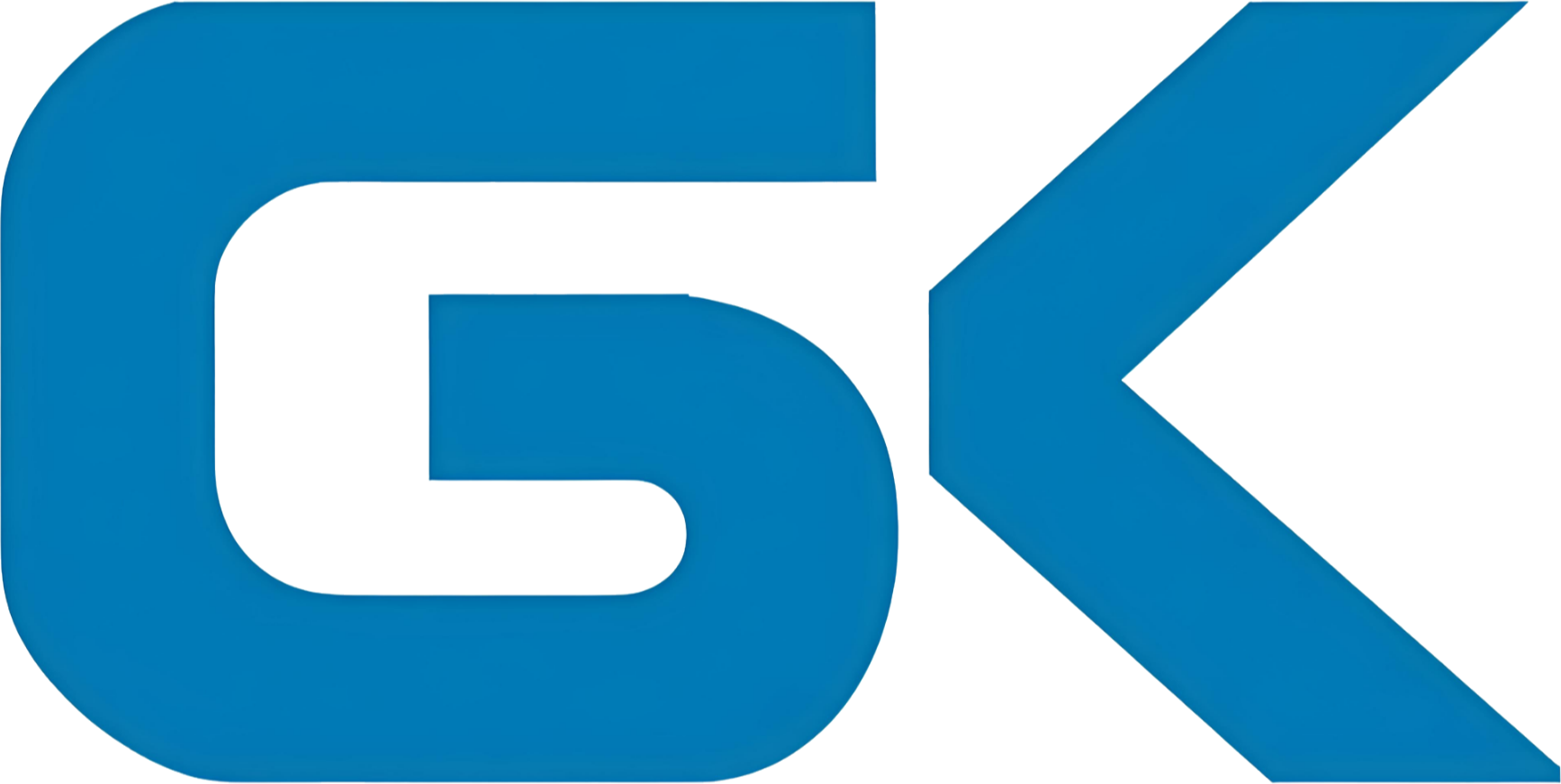

- Type: Daily newspaper
- Format: Broadsheet
- Owner: GK Communications Pvt. Ltd.
- Publisher: GK Communications Pvt. Ltd. (Rashid Makhdoomi)
- Editor-in-chief: Fayaz Ahmad Kaloo
- Founded: 1987 36 years ago
- Political alignment: Independent
- Language: English
- Headquarters: Jammu and Kashmir, Srinagar
- Country: India
- Circulation: 25,000 Per Day (Approx), Largest Circulated Newspaper in Jammu and Kashmir union territory
- Sister newspapers: Kashmir Uzma
- OCLC number: 143593517
- Website: www.greaterkashmir.com

Greater Kashmir is an English daily newspaper printed and published from Srinagar, the summer capital of Jammu and Kashmir. The newspaper initially began its edition in 1987 as a weekly newspaper and later, started its first daily publication in 1989.

The Greater Kashmir has its largest base of circulation in Jammu and Kashmir, and is the most widely read English daily newspaper in the state. The Greater Kashmir group (GK Communications Pvt. Ltd) also publishes its sister projects in Urdu language – Nawa-e-Jhelum and Kashmir Uzma – and the English-language magazine Kashmir Ink.

As of 2018, Greater Kashmir is being published from Srinagar and Jammu at the price of Rs. 5 per copy. Its editor-in-chief is Fayaz Ahmad Kaloo. Greater Kashmir lately started Kashmir Ink, a weekly magazine featuring Kashmir's artists, poets and also writing many soft stories. The executive editor of its magazine Kashmir Ink is Ahaya Fayaz. The newspaper also launched its Endeavor Page, in which several start-ups in Jammu and Kashmir region are featured.

== Advertisement controversy ==
In February 2019, the Governor's office indefinitely stopped giving government ads to this paper as well as to the Kashmir Reader. The Kashmir Editors Guild decried this as an attempt to curb the freedom of the press in India. However the government ads were restored to Greater Kashmir later on.
