= 1970 Bhiwandi riots =

Civil riot in Bhiwandi, India

1970 Bhiwandi violence
- Part of Religious violence in India
- Date: 7–8 May 1970
- Location: Bhiwandi, Jalgaon and Mahad (Maharashtra, India)

Parties
Hindus	Muslims
RSS	Jamaat-e-Islami
Jana Sangh	IUML
Shiv Sena

Casualties and losses
37 deaths	192 deaths

The 1970 Bhiwandi riots were religious riots which occurred on 7 and 8 May in the Indian towns of Bhiwandi, Jalgaon and Mahad, between Hindus and Muslims. The riots caused the deaths of over 250 people; the Justice Madon commission, which investigated the riots, stated that 142 Muslims and 20 Hindus had been killed in Bhiwandi alone, and 50 Muslims and 17 Hindus in the surrounding areas. The commission strongly criticized the police for anti-Muslim bias in the aftermath of the riots, and also criticized the Shiv Sena, a Hindu-nationalist political party, for its role in the violence.

== The riots ==
There had been a prolonged period of tension between Indian Nationalist groups such as the Rashtriya Swayamsevak Sangh (RSS), Bharatiya Jana Sangh and Shiv Sena, and the Muslim radical groups Jamaat-i-Islami, the Muslim League and Majlis Tameer-e-Millat. The Rashtriya Utsav Mandal had campaigned for permission to have a procession to celebrate the birthday of the Maratha warrior-King Shivaji, which would pass through an area where the residents were predominantly Muslims, and by a mosque. Permission was given over the protests of Muslim leaders and on 7 May the procession began.

The procession was organised by Shiv Sena and supporters of the Hindu right, who, it was reported, arrived armed with lathis. Between 3,000 and 4,000 people had travelled from villages close to Bhiwandi, and once the procession began, some Muslims threw stones which triggered the violence. Once the violence began the police opened fire several times. An indefinite curfew was declared by the police at 10:00 p.m. (IST) that night. As violence ensued, fire engines and ambulances were brought in from Bombay, Thane, Ulhasnagar, Kalyan, Ambarnath and other nearby places. The Indian Express reported that "knives and acid bulbs were freely used in the places".

Subsequently, a 24-hour curfew was imposed also in the neighbouring town of Jalgaon, where 50 were reportedly injured by 8 May. The official figures put the total death toll at 21. The Indian Army was called in the same day to the two towns to bring the situation under control. It was reported that towns returned to "normalcy" the following day.

== Aftermath ==
Following the incident, the Indian government formed a Commission headed by Justice Dinshah Pirosha Madon. The final report from the commission ran to seven volumes and was highly critical of the police for their failure to prevent the riots, the report was also highly critical of Shiv Sena for their part in the violence.

According to the Madon report, of those arrested during the violence, 324 were Hindu and 2,183 were Muslim. The report was highly critical of the police, stating that their action showed a clear "anti-Muslim bias". According to K. Jaishankar, of those arrested for clearly identifiable crimes during the violence in 1970, 21 were Hindu and 901 were Muslim, a figure disproportionate to the numbers of casualties (which Jaishankar gives as 17 Hindus and 59 Muslims).

Economic costs for the riots in Bhiwandi, according to the Madon and police reports ran to ₹15,320,163. In Jalgaon, 112 Muslim properties and been attacked by arsonists, with 87 of these being razed to the ground. There was looting of 250 properties and another 28 had been damaged. Economic costs for the violence in Jalgaon ran to ₹3,474,722 with the costs to Muslims being ₹3,390,997.

The commission gave a death toll of 164 in Bhiwandi alone, 142 Muslims and 20 Hindus, and in the nearby villages of Khoni and Nagaon the commission stated that there had been 78 deaths, 17 Hindus and 50 Muslims.

== See also ==
- Hindu terrorism

== Bibliography ==
- Banerjee, Sikata (2005). Make Me a Man!: Masculinity, Hinduism, and Nationalism in India. State University of New York Press. ISBN 978-0791463680.
- Engineer, Asgharali (2003). "Introduction". In Asgharali Engineer (ed.). The Gujarat Carnage. Orient Blackswan. ISBN 978-8125024965.
- Graff, Violette; Galonnier, Juliette (2013). "Hindu-Muslim Communal Riots in India I (1947–1986)". Online Encyclopedia of Mass Violence. ISSN 1961-9898.
- Horowitz, Donald L. (2001). The Deadly Ethnic Riot. University of California Press. ISBN 978-0520224476.
- Hansen, Thomas Blom (2001). Wages of Violence: Naming and Identity in Postcolonial Bombay. Princeton University Press. ISBN 978-0691088402.
- Jaishankar, K. (2010). "Patterns of Communal Violence Victimization in South Asia". In Shlomo Giora Shoham; Paul Knepper; Martin Kett (eds.). International Handbook of Victimology. CRC Press. pp. 182–213. ISBN 978-1420085471.
- Robinson, Rowena (2005). Tremors of Violence: Muslim Survivors of Ethnic Strife in Western India. SAGE. ISBN 978-0761934080.
