= Nagaon (disambiguation) =

Nagaon may refer to the following entities in India:

- Nagaon, city and municipal board in middle Assam
- Nagaon District, administrative district in Indian state of Assam
- Nagaon (village), village in Assam, India
- Nagaon, Raigad District, beach town on shores of Arabian Sea in Maharashtra, India
- Nagaon Budruk, village in Maharashtra

== See also ==
- Nowgong (disambiguation)
