= Aziz Hajini =

Kashmiri writer, poet, and critic (1957–2021)

- Born: Abdul Aziz Parray; 7 March 1957; Hajan, Jammu and Kashmir, India
- Died: 11 September 2021 (aged 64); Jammu and Kashmir, India
- Education: University of Kashmir
- Occupations: Writer; poet; critic
- Writing career
- Pen name: Aziz Hajini
- Language: Kashmiri
- Subject: Literature
- Notable awards: Sahitya Akademi Award

Aziz Hajini (born Abdul Aziz Parray; 7 March 1957 – 11 September 2021) was a Kashmiri writer, poet, critic and convenor of Sahitya Akademi for New Delhi's Northern Regional Board. He served as a government school teacher for 30 years before being appointed as assistant professor at the department of Kashmiri of the University of Kashmir until he retired from active service in 2019. In between he was appointed secretary of Jammu and Kashmir Academy of Art, Culture and Languages in 2015 by PDP led government which evoked severe criticism in the media for his alleged links with the separatists.

== Biography ==
Hajini was born as Abdul Aziz Parray in 1957 at Hajan area of Bandipura, Jammu and Kashmir. He did his early schooling at Hajan, and later moved to Srinagar city where he graduated from the Government Degree College, Bemina. He later received honours degree in Kashmiri language from the University of Kashmir. He is first gold medalist of the university in the Kashmiri language category. He obtained PhD in 2017 from the same university. Prior to his PhD, he qualified for the National Eligibility Test (NET).

Hajini died on 11 September 2021, at the age of 64.

=== Career ===
He was elected as the president of Adbee Markaz Kamraz, an NGO of the Jammu and Kashmir. From 2008 to 2012, he served as convenor of Sahitya Akademi for Kashmiri languages. Prior to this, he served as a member of the Akademi from 1997 to 2002.

In 2015, his book Aane Khane, a literary criticism covering Kashmiri literature and language was released by the then governor of Jammu and Kashmir Narinder Nath Vohra and later in 2016, he became the recipient of Akademi Award in Kashmir after the book was released to general public.

He was also appointed a member of the Indian Institute of Public Administration for Delhi and a member of the National Book Trust in 2012. From 1998 to 2000, he was appointed president of Kashmir Theater Association an NGO and between 1998 and 2008, served as general secretary of the Adbi Markaz Kamraz. He also participated in literary seminars abroad such as the US, the UAE and in Canada.

== Literary contribution ==
He wrote more than twenty books in Kashmiri language, including poetry and criticism.

== Controversy ==
His appointment as Secretary of Jammu Kashmir Academy of Art Culture and languages (JAACL) in 2015 evoked severe criticism in the media for his alleged links with the separatists, especially with Umar Farooq All Party Hurriyat Conference Chief.

== Awards ==
In 2013, he translated 'Do Gaz Zameen, a novel by Abdul Samad into Kashmiri language, leading it to become the recipient of an uncertain award for best translation in Kashmiri.

Year	Nominated work	Award	Category	Result	Ref.
2013	Teuth Pazar	Sahitya Akademi Award	Best Book	Won	
2016	Aane Khane	Sahitya Akademi Award	Best Book	Won	
