= Adbi Markaz Kamraz =

Literary, cultural organization of Jammu and Kashmir

- Adbi Markaz Kamraz Jammu and Kashmir
- Official patch of the AMK
- Abbreviation: AMK
- Founder: Rashid Nazki (Note: He was one of the founders)
- Type: Nonprofit cultural and literary organization
- Legal status: Foundation
- Purpose: Activism
- Headquarters: Baramulla, Jammu and Kashmir
- Locations: Srinagar, India; New York, United States; Delhi, India
- Origins: Kashmir
- Region served: Jammu and Kashmir
- Fields: Art, Culture, Literature, Languages
- Official languages: Kashmiri, Urdu, English
- President: Mohmmad Amin Bhat
- Secretary: Shabnum Tailgami
- Treasurer: Abdul Ahad Hajini
- Media Secretary: Aadil Ismail
- Affiliations: Jammu and Kashmir Academy of Art, Culture and Languages
- Website: www.adbimarkazkamraz.org

Adbi Markaz Kamraz (AMK), also known as Adbee Markaz Kamraz Jammu and Kashmir (AMKJK), is the oldest and largest cultural and literary organisation in Jammu and Kashmir. It is focused on promoting and preserving Kashmiri culture, literature, art, and language.

Sponsored by the government of Jammu and Kashmir, it is headquartered in the Baramullah district of the Kashmir Valley. It comprises 22 to 24 registered literary and cultural organizations in the valley responsible for literary activities such as promoting research, arranging meetings, and publishing books by Kashmiri writers.

In 2012, it organised the Kashmir Literature Festival, the first-ever literary festival focused on internationalizing the Kashmiri language and addressing the issues responsible for its decline in the state. It was inspired by similar events in Jaipur and Karachi. Later that year, it established one of its branch offices for literary activities in Delhi aimed at highlighting and promoting the Kashmiri language for Kashmiris in the National Capital Region (NCR).

== Base units ==
In 2015, the organisation proposed establishing its headquarters in London and New York City to promote and safeguard the Kashmiri language abroad. It has also been engaged with the state government to introduce regional languages in the curriculum recognised by the Jammu and Kashmir State Board of School Education.

== Journals ==
Adbi Markaz Kamraz publishes a biannual academic journal called Praave, also spelled Prav or Prave, which highlights the work of the organization and the associated individuals.

== Composition ==
Name	Designation	Term	Ref.
Amin Bhat	President	2021–present	
Farooq Shaheen	Secretary	2021–present	
Majeed Majaz	Treasurer	—N/a	
Jameel Ansari	Media Secretary	2021–present	

== Awards established ==
It has established various literary awards such as Shehjar-e-Adab Lolab, Khilat-e-Hanfi Sopori, and Sharaf-e-Kamraz, which, according to the organisation, is one of the most prestigious awards in the region. These awards are presented to writers and educationists in recognition of their contribution to the Kashmiri language and literature annually.

== Digitalisation initiatives ==
In 2023, Adbi Markaz Kamraz launched an online campaign advocating for the inclusion of the Kashmiri language in Google and Android translation tools, as well as the development of a dedicated keyboard. While Microsoft already offers this option, it remains in its early stages and requires further improvement.
