= List of Sahitya Akademi Award winners for Kashmiri =

Highest Literary Honour given by Government of India

Sahitya Akademi Award for Kashmiri
- Award for contributions to Kashmiri literature
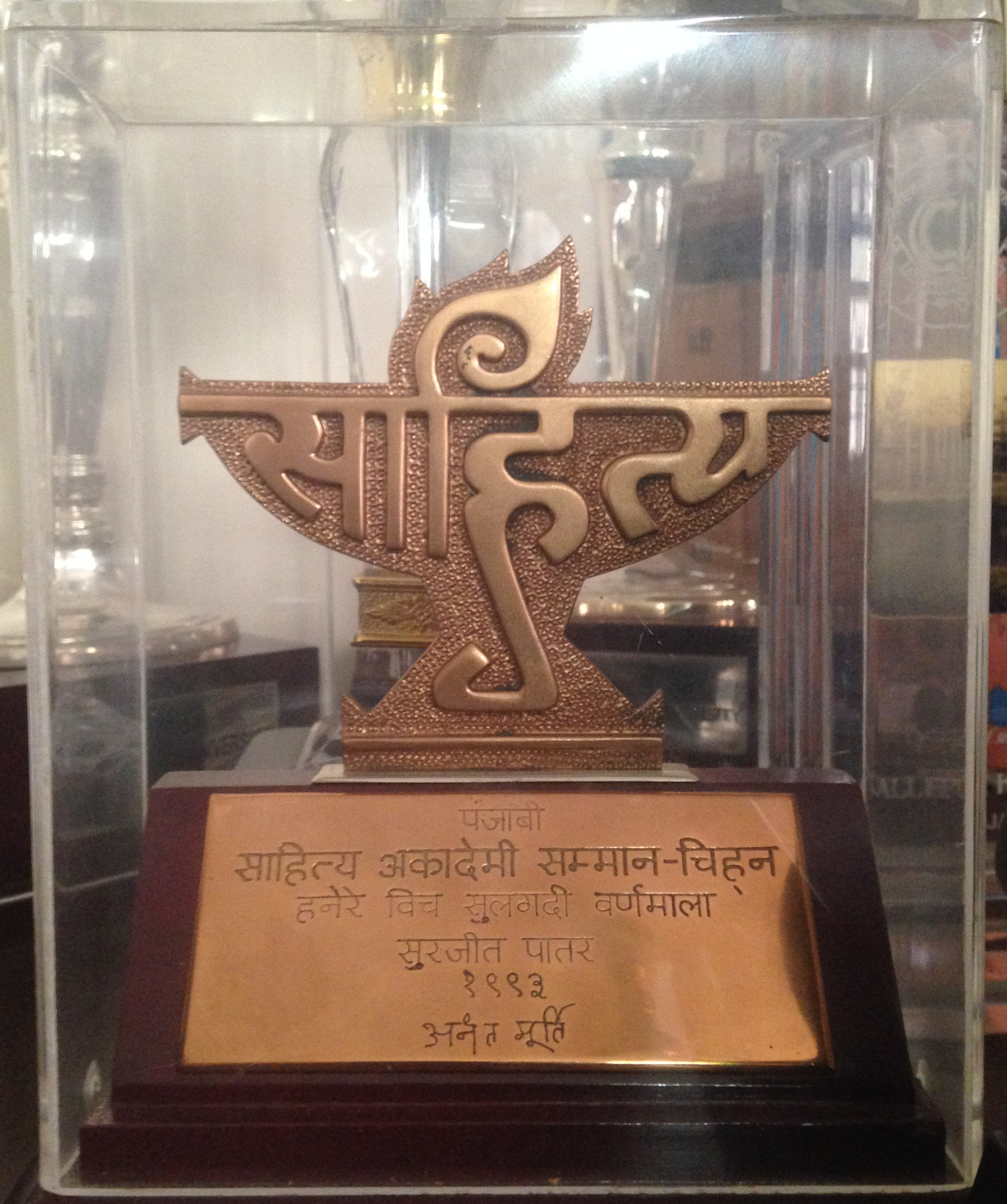
- Awarded for: Literary award in India
- Sponsored by: Sahitya Akademi, Government of India
- Reward: ₹1 lakh (US$1,100)
- First award: 1956
- Final award: 2024

Highlights
- Total awarded: 53
- First winner: Zinda Kaul
- Most Recent winner: Sohan Koul
- Website: Official website

Part of a series on

Sahitya Akademi Awards
Category
Sahitya Akademi Award winners by language
- Assamese
- Bengali
- Bodo
- Dogri
- English
- Gujarati
- Hindi
- Kannada
- Kashmiri
- Konkani
- Maithili
- Malayalam
- Marathi
- Meitei (Manipuri)
- Nepali
- Odia
- Punjabi
- Rajasthani
- Sanskrit
- Santali
- Sindhi
- Tamil
- Telugu
- Urdu
Sahitya Akademi Translation Prizes
- Assamese
- Bengali
- Bodo
- Dogri
- English
- Gujarati
- Hindi
- Kannada
- Kashmiri
- Konkani
- Maithili
- Malayalam
- Marathi
- Meitei (Manipuri)
- Nepali
- Odia
- Punjabi
- Rajasthani
- Sanskrit
- Santali
- Sindhi
- Tamil
- Telugu
- Urdu
Sahitya Akademi Yuva Puraskar
- Assamese
- Bengali
- Bodo
- Dogri
- English
- Gujarati
- Hindi
- Kannada
- Kashmiri
- Konkani
- Maithili
- Malayalam
- Meitei (Manipuri)
- Marathi
- Nepali
- Odia
- Punjabi
- Rajasthani
- Sanskrit
- Santali
- Sindhi
- Tamil
- Telugu
- Urdu
Sahitya Akademi Bal Sahitya Puraskar
- Assamese
- Bengali
- Bodo
- Dogri
- English
- Gujarati
- Hindi
- Kannada
- Kashmiri
- Konkani
- Maithili
- Malayalam
- Meitei (Manipuri)
- Marathi
- Nepali
- Odia
- Punjabi
- Rajasthani
- Sanskrit
- Santali
- Sindhi
- Tamil
- Telugu
- Urdu
Related
- Eighth Schedule to the Constitution of India
- Official Languages Commission
- List of languages by number of native speakers in India

The Sahitya Akademi Awards have been given annually since 1955 by the Sahitya Akademi, India's National Academy of Letters. They are awarded to writers in the various languages of India in recognition of their outstanding contribution to the upliftment of Indian literature. The following list comprises recipients of the award for Kashmiri literature.

== Winners ==
Year	Author	Work	Genre
1956	Zinda Kaul 'Masterji'	Sumran	Poetry
1958	Akhtar Mohiuddin	Sat Sangar	Short stories
1961	Rehman Rahi	Nauroz-i-Saba	Poetry
1967	Amin Kamil	Laveh Te Praveh	Poetry
1969	Abdul Khaliq Tak Zainagiri	Ka 'Shri Zab': Ny Hund Alleqavaad Phera	Linguistic study
1970	Mohiuddin Hajini	Maqualaat	Essays
1972	Ali Mohammad Lone	Suyya	Play
1975	Ghulam Nabi Khayal	Gaashir Munar	Essays
1976	Pushkar Bhan	Machaama	Plays
1978	G.R. Santosh	Be Soakh Rooh	Poetry
1979	Marghoob Banihali	Partavistan	Poetry
1981	Moti Lal Saqi	Mansar	Poetry
1982	Moti Lal Kemmu	Natak Truche	Drama
1984	Mohd. Zaman Azurdah	Essay	Essays
1985	Mirza G.H. Beg Arif	Lole Vetsar	Poetry
1986	Dina Nath Nadim	Shihil Kul	Poetry
1987	Mir Ghulam Rasool Nazki	Awaz-i-Dost	Poetry
1988	Ghulam Nabi Gowhar	Pun-Te-Pap	Novel
1989	Pran Kishore	Sheen Te Watpod	Novel
1990	Fazil Kashmiri	Kashur Sarmaya	Poetry
1991	Ghulam Nabi Tak Naazir	Achhre Tsange	Poetry
1992	Shafi Shaida	Amaar	Poetry
1993	Syed Rasool Pompur	Kenh Natu Kenh	Essay
1994	Sajood Sailani	Kaeji Raath	Play
1995	M. Farooq Nazki	Naar Hyutun Kanzal Wanas	Poetry
1997	Rafiq Raaz	Nai Che Nallan	Poetry
1998	Mohammad Yousuf Taing	Mahjoor Shinasi	Criticism
1999	Rashid Nazki	Vahrat	Poetry
2000	Harikrishna Kaul	Yath Raaz Danay	Short stories
2001	Mohiud-Din-Gowhar	Rikhah	Poetry
2002	Naji Munawar	Pursaan	Criticism
2003	Som Nath Zutshi	Yell Phol Gaash	Short stories
2004	Ghulam Nabi Firaq	Sada Te Samandar	Poetry
2005	Hamidi Kashmiri	Yath Miani Joye	Poetry
2006	Shafi Shouq	Yaad Aasmanan Hinz	Poetry
2007	Rattan Lal Shant	Tshen	Short stories
2008	Gh. Nabi Firaq	Baazyaafat	Criticism
2009	Mishal Sultanpuri	Vont	Literary Criticism
2010	Basher Bashir	Yiman Padan Mye Vetsaar Gotshuy	Criticism
2011	Naseem Shafaie	Na Thsay Na Aks	Poetry
2012	Makhan Lal Kanwal	Yath Aangnas Manz	Poetry
2013	Mohi-ud-Din Reshi	Aina Aatash	Short stories
2014	Shad Ramzan	Kore Kakud Pushrith Gome	Poetry
2015	Bashir Bhadarwahi	Jamis Ta Kasheeri Manz Kashir Natia Adabuk Tawareekh	Criticism
2016	Aziz Hajini	Aan e Khane	Criticism
2017	Autar Krishen Rahbar	Yeli Parda Woth	Short Stories
2018	Mushtaq Ahmad Mushtaq	Aakh	Short Stories
2019	Abdul Ahad Hajini	Akh Yaad Akh Qayamat	Short stories
2020	Hriday Koul Bharti	Tilasm-e-Khanabadosh	Short stories
2021	Wali Mohd. Aseer Kashtawari	Tawazun	Criticism
2022	Farooq Fayaz	Zael Dab	Literary Criticism
2023	Manshoor Banihali	Yeth Waweh Halay Tsong Kous Zalay	Poetry
2024	Sohan Koul	Psychiatric Ward	Novel
2025	Ali Shaida	Najdavanek'y Pot Aalav	Poetry
