= Nagaon Budruk =

Village in Maharashtra

Nagaon BK
- Village
- Location in Maharashtra, India Nagaon BK (India)
- Coordinates: 21.069348°N 75.141248°E
- Country: India
- State: Maharashtra
- District: Jalgaon

Population (2009)
  - Total: 7,000 approx

Languages
  - Official: Marathi
- Time zone: UTC+5:30 (IST)
- PIN: 425401
- Telephone code: 02587

Nagaon BK is a small but prosperous village in Amalner Taluka, Jalgaon District, Maharashtra, India.

It is located on the bank of the river Chikhali, accommodating over 7,000 residents. It is surrounded by four small villages: Gadkhamb, Kachare, Dhupi and Manjardi. Nagaon BK has a community of diverse people, including Jadhav (Patil), Bodhare, Borse, and Bavas as well as some minorities like Bhillas. There are several locations near village which depict historical significance of the community.

== Transportation and communication ==
Situated beside State Highway 14 (1 km away from Highway), Nagaon is well connected to Amalner and Chopda. It is approximately 70 kms away from Jalgaon District. There is Autorickshaw (Tum-Tum) available from Amalner (Taluka Place) to reach Nagaon which is hardly at a 20 minute distance from Amalner.

Sharing 6-seaters or autos is an easily available option, which takes customers right to the gate of Nagaon or to the house they want to visit.

The nearest post office to Nagaon is in Amalner; however, Nagaon does have a sub post office to serve the locals for their daily routines. Nagaon's postal code is 425401, while 02587 and +912587 are its STD and ISD codes respectively. It has a cell and Internet connectivity from countries all major network operators.

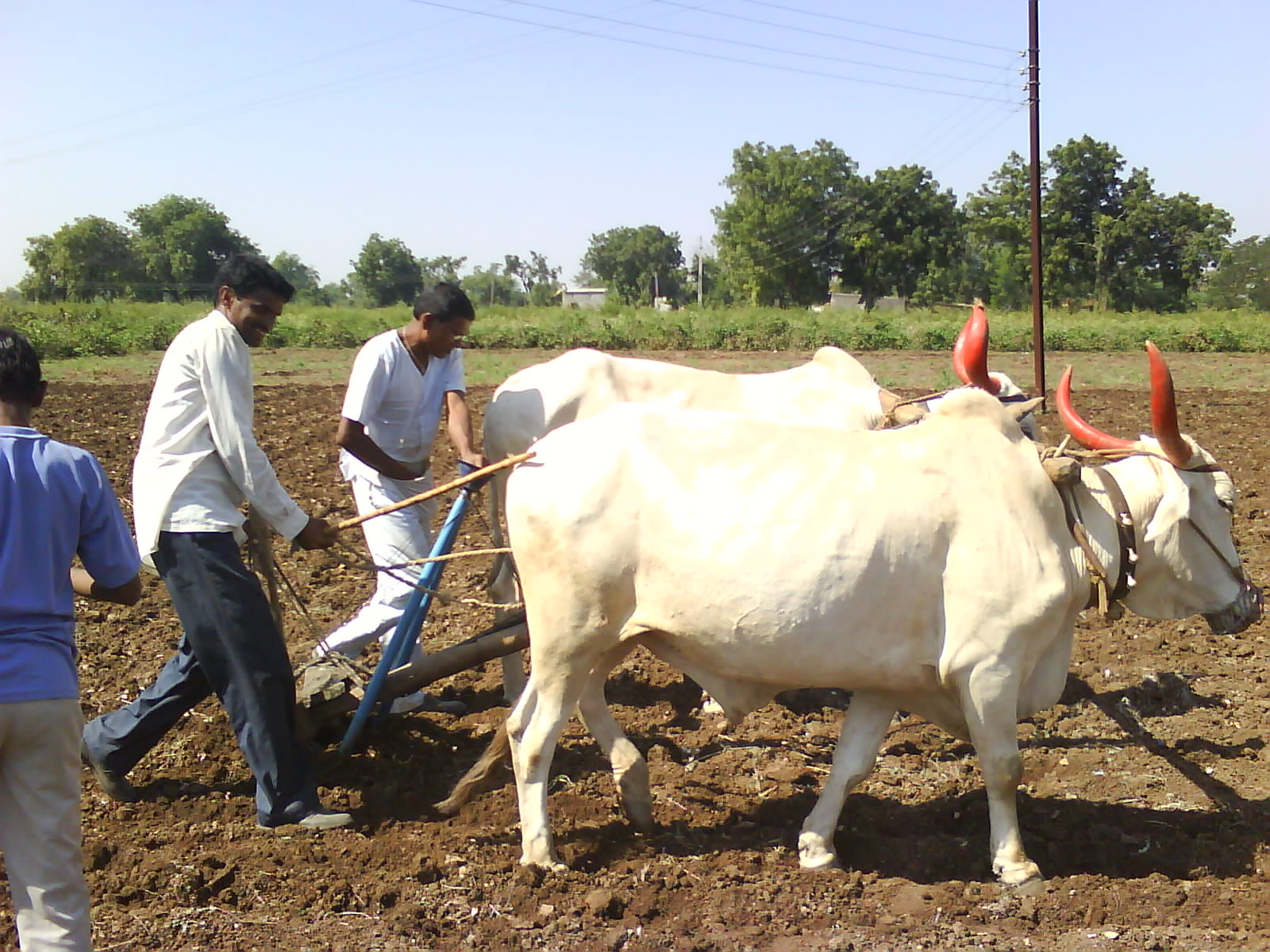
Farming

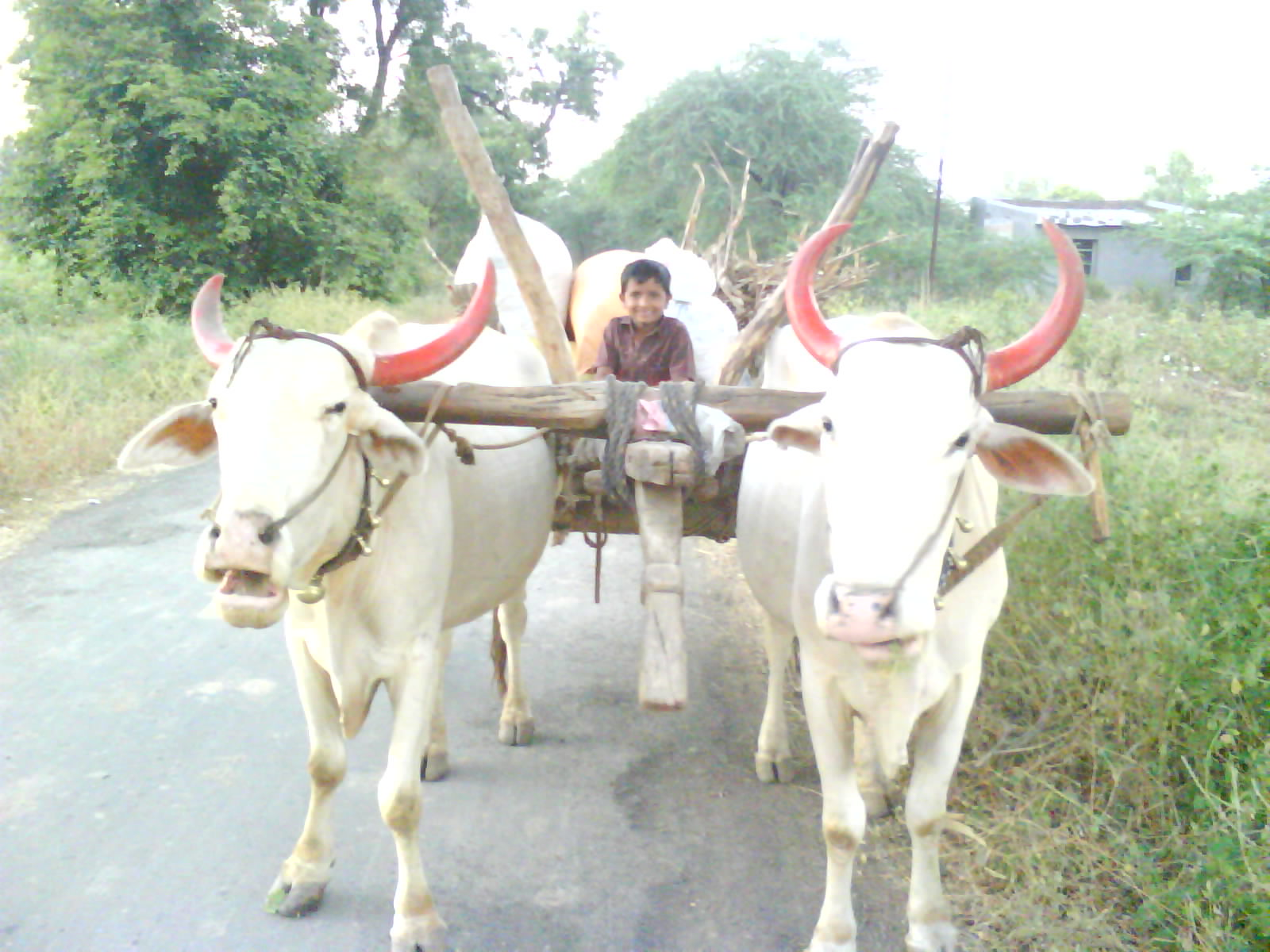
Bail Gadi

== Occupations and key activities ==
The dominant occupation in the village is farming. The area is bestowed with rich black soil and uses advanced irrigation techniques. Cotton, wheat, groundnuts, jowar, bajra, dadar and vegetables are the main crop products of the village. Given the good transport facilities, products are traded in markets such as Amalner, Chopda, Dharangaon and Jalgaon. Many farmers are actively involved in finding new and convenient techniques of farming.

Other people have opted for professions such as dairy farming or operation of restaurants, retail stores, garages, etc.

More than 100 young people from the village are serving in state and central defence forces. It is the only village in the district to have this many soldiers and policemen in service. Over 50 engineers from Nagaon are associated with organizations in diverse fields such as mechanical, chemical, IT/software, hospitality and management, some of them being at higher managerial positions in big corporate, technology organizations in the Metro cities of India. Many residents have been sent abroad on work-related trips to countries like USA, Germany, Singapore, Oman, Qatar, Thailand, Ghana and Dubai. Few individuals have excelled in academics by acquiring PhDs in relevant subjects.

== Cultural activities ==
Cultural and communal activities are a core attribute of Nagaon.

Shiv Jayanti, Ganesh Chaturthi, Navratri, Hanuman Jayanti, Ram Navami, Makar Sankranti, Gudhi Padwa, Akshay Tritiya (Akhaji), Pola, Dasra, Holi, and Diwali are the main festivals celebrated together in Nagaon.

During the Makar Sankranti and Dasra celebrations, people pay respect to each other and do Pranam to elders, while distributing sweets (Til Gul) and gold (Aptyachi Pane).

Navratri and Ganesh Chaturthi in Nagaon are the festivals to watch and wait for. During Navratri, people leave their daily chores and actively engage in the 9-day celebration and worship of the Goddess Indasani (believed to be a sibling of Saptashrungi).

Especially during the Diwali holidays, the people who are working outside the village get together with their families at Native Nagaon.They spend 3-4 days with their families.

== Languages ==
Even though Marathi is the official state language, Ahirani is a widely spoken and accepted language in and around the village.

== Education ==
The following schools are attended by local students:

- Primary School: Zilha parishad prathmik shala, Nagaon BK
- Higher Secondary School and College: Madyamik & Uccha Madyamik Vidyalay Nagaon-Gadkhamb
- Bahuddeshiya Aashram School of Nagaon Gadkhamb
- Pratap College in Amalner is the nearest science, arts and commerce college.

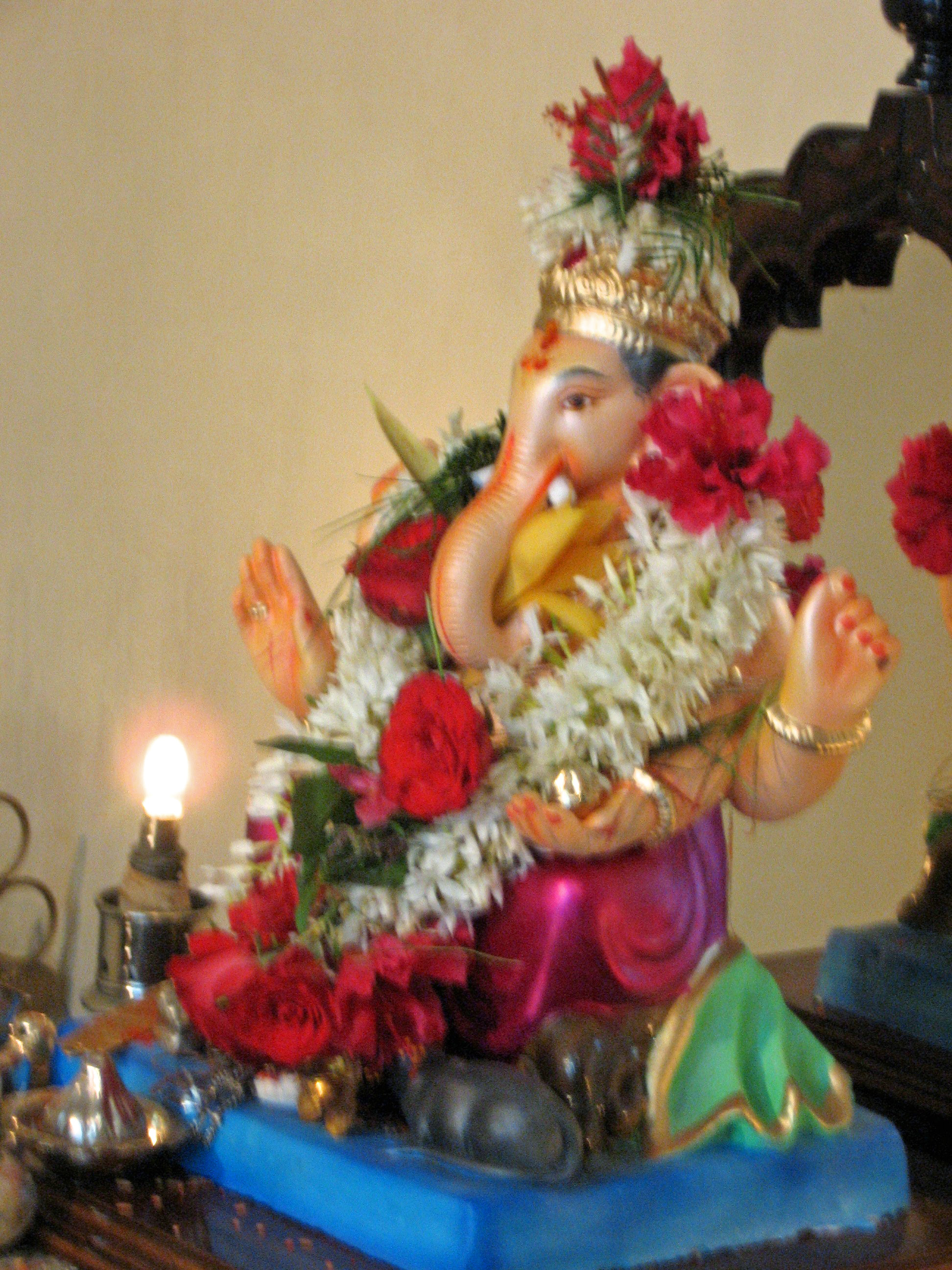
Ganesh Chaturthi

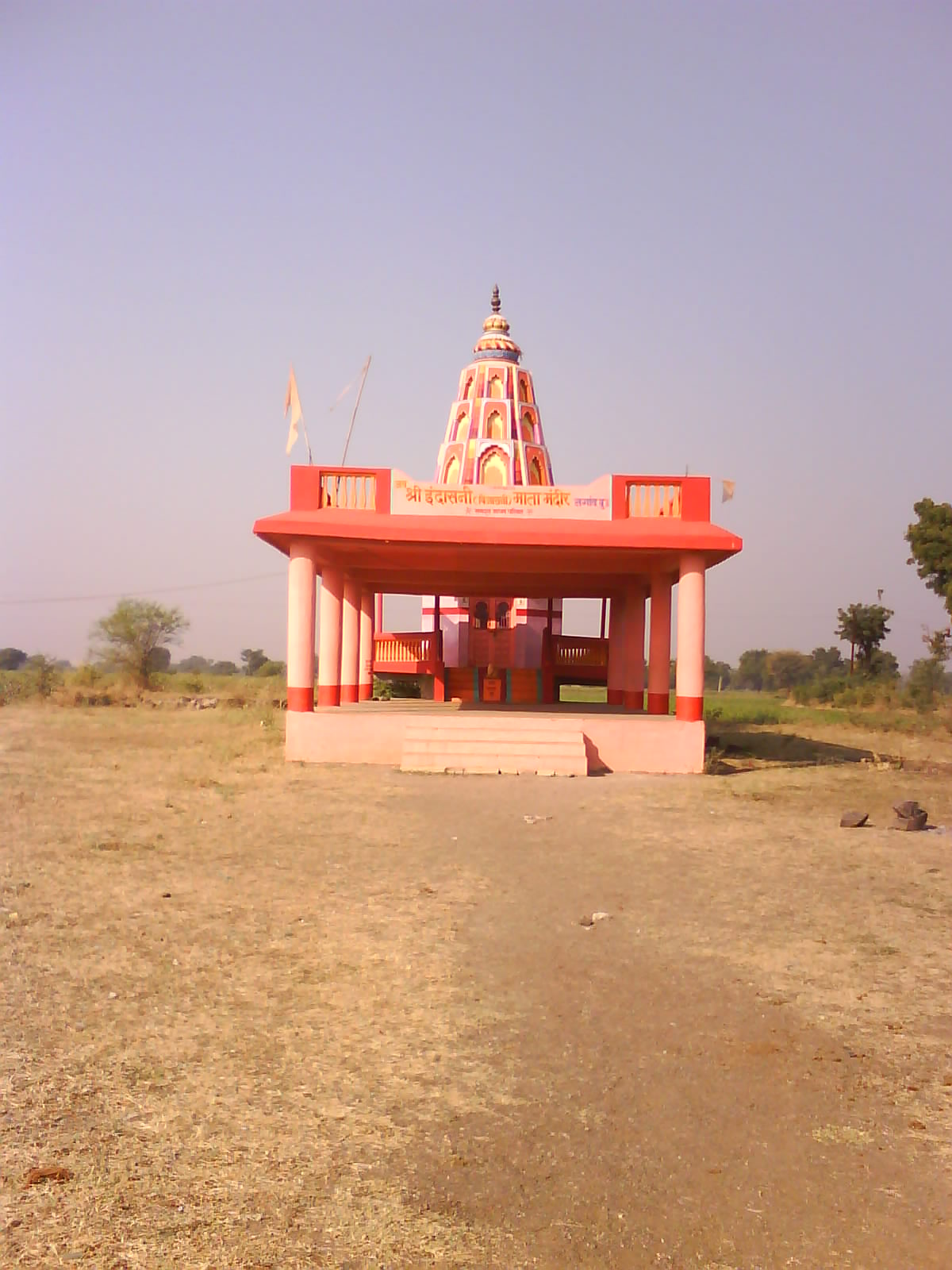
Indasani Mata Temple

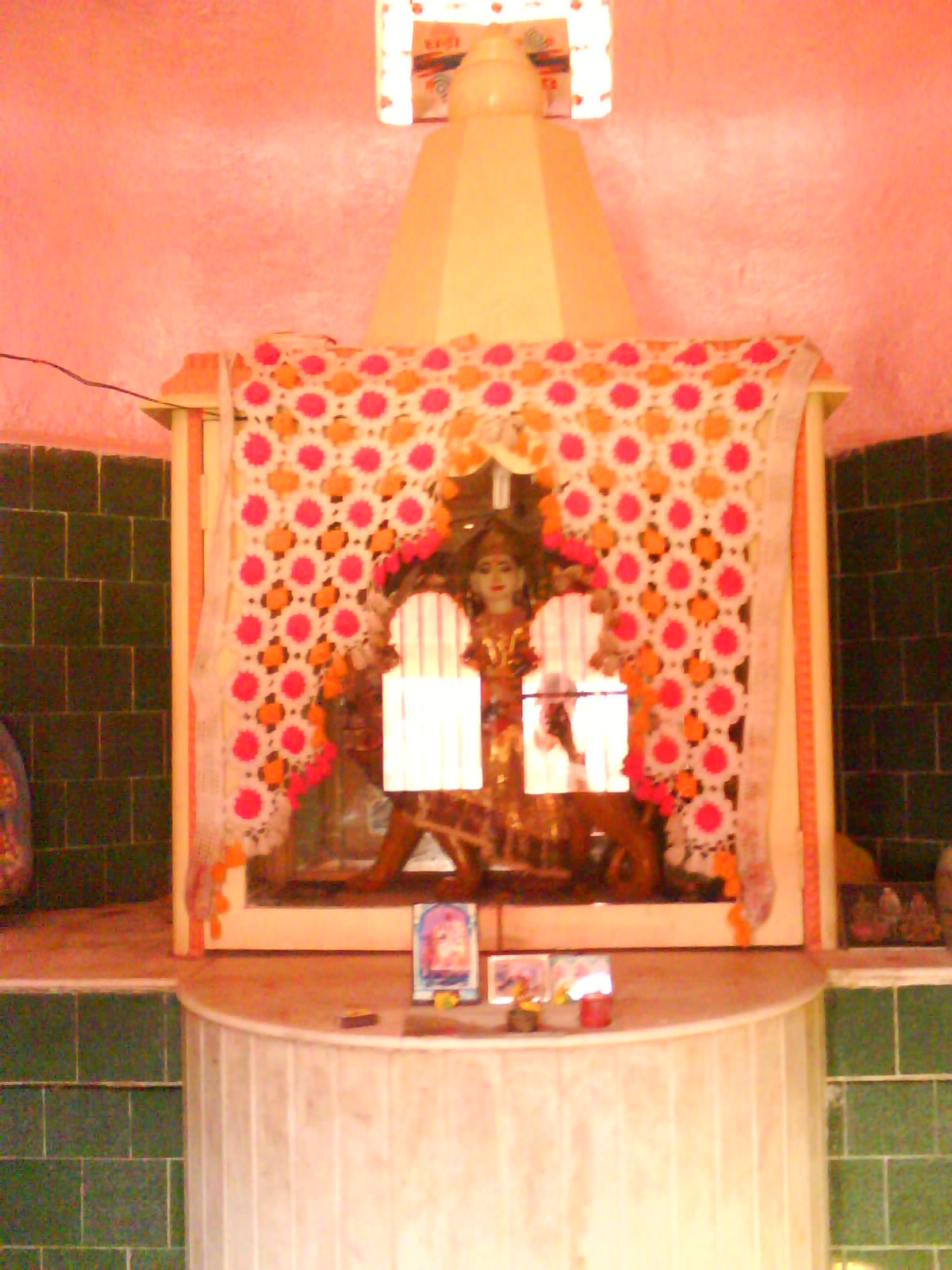
Indasani Mata

== Temples and key locations ==
- Indasani Mata
- Ram Temple
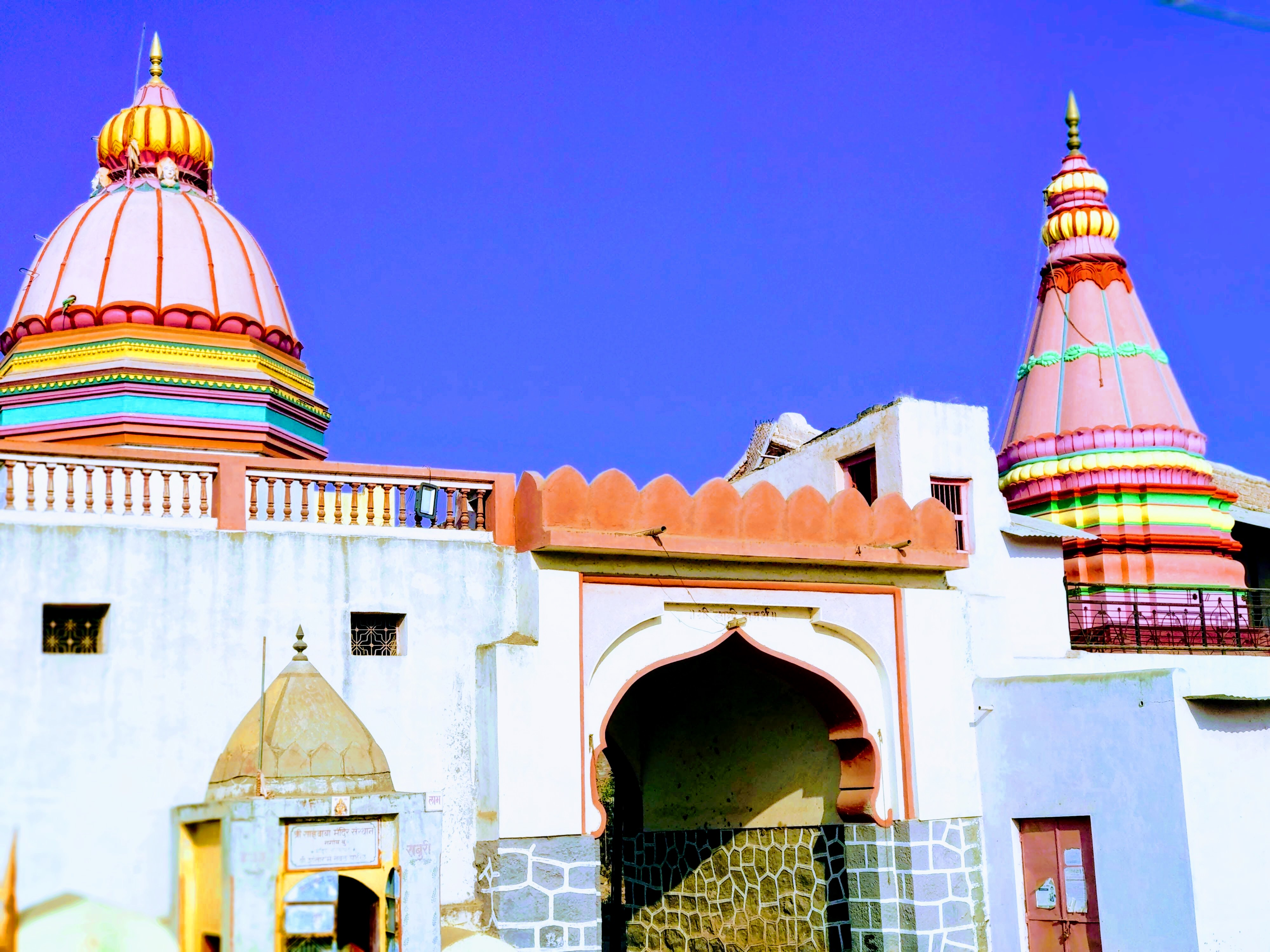
  Ram Temple
- Mari Mata
- Mahadev (Shiv)
- Sai Baba
- Hanuman
- Guru Maharaj
