= Abdul Ahad Hajini =

Kashmiri writer, translator

Abdul Ahad Hajni
- Born: 9 April 1948 (age 78); Jammu and Kashmir
- Occupations: Writer, translator
- Writing career
- Language: Kashmiri
- Notable works: Teuth Pazar, Akh Yaad Akh Qayamat
- Notable awards: Sahitya Akademi Award

Abdul Ahad Hajni (born 19 April 1948) is an Indian writer, translator and treasurer of Adbee Markaz Kamraz. He predominantly writes in Kashmiri language. He is primarily known for translating Indian language books such as Assamese, Kannada, Telugu and Dogri languages into Kashmiri.

The recipient of Sahitya Akademi Award in Kashmiri, he wrote a book titled Teuth Pazar (Bitter truth), consisting translation of six short stories from different Indian regional languages into Kashmiri.

== Awards ==
- 2019: Sahitya Akademi Award – for Akh Yaad Akh Qayamat (One memory one judgement day)
- 2016: Sahitya Akademi Award – for Raay-Traay (opinions)
