= Zinda Kaul =

Indian poet and writer

Zinda Kaul (1884–1965) was a Kashmiri poet, writer and teacher. He composed in Persian, Hindi, Urdu and Kashmiri. Kaul also translated works of Kashmiri into English, Persian and Hindi.

== Personal life ==
Zinda Kaul was also known as MasterJi by his students and friends.

Kaul was born in August 1884 in Habbakadal, a town in Srinagar into a Kashmiri Pandit family. His father, Lakshman Pandit, was indifferent to his formal education and Kaul had to face many difficulties in his life. He was a school teacher for a long time. After that, he worked as a clerk. In 1939, Kaul retired from the Publicity office of Kashmir as a translator.

== Death ==
He died in Jammu in the winter of 1965.

== Literary work ==
Zinda Kaul was the first Kashmiri poet to win the Sahitya Academy award in 1956, for his book of poetry compilations Sumran. It was first published in Devanagari, and later the government had it printed in the Persio-Arabic script. The Sahitya Academy of India gave Kaul an award of five thousand rupees for this book.

Kaul initially wrote in Persian, Hindi, and Urdu. His first poem was Unity and Sympathy, written in 1896 and recited it at the Sanatan Dharm Sabha meeting in Srinagar. Masterji started writing in Kashmiri in 1942. In his Kashmiri poetry, he has written primarily on devotion, philosophy and peace. Masterji's poetry has been published in all these four languages. However, he made his name by writing in Kashmiri.

Kaul composed poetry only for his own pleasure. Critics say that his poems in Kashmiri were better than those in Hindi and Urdu.

=== Translations ===
Zinda Kaul translated the works of the mystic Kashmiri writer and poet Nand Ram Parmanand into English, in three volumes.

== Award ==
- Sahitya Academy Award for Kashmiri literature (1956), for Sumran.

== See also ==
- List of Sahitya Akademi Award winners for Kashmiri
