= Mushtaq Ahmad Mushtaq =

Kashmiri writer, broadcaster

- Born: Mushtaq Ahmad Tantray; 8 August 1961 (age 65); Jammu and Kashmir, India
- Education: MA
- Alma mater: University of Kashmir
- Occupations: Short story writer, broadcaster
- Writing career
- Pen name: Mushtaq
- Language: Kashmiri
- Notable work: Aakh
- Notable awards: Sahitya Akademi Award

Mushtaq Ahmad Tantray (born 8 August 1961) is an Indian writer, broadcaster and journalist. Currently serving as deputy director of Radio Kashmir Srinagar for news department, he previously worked as a newsreader at Radio Kashmir, Srinagar and DD Kashir.

== Biography ==
He was born on 8 August 1961 in Budgam district, Jammu and Kashmir. He obtained his master's degree in Kashmiri language from the University of Kashmir He later joined Indian Information Service as a junior grade officer after qualifying Union Public Service Commission (UPSC) exam between 1985 and 86. He worked for over nine years at DD Kashir. He also worked in the Ministry of Information and Broadcasting as an IIS officer.

In 2018 be became the recipient of Sahitya Akademi Award in Kashmiri for his book titled Aakh (A Scar) which was published in 2012, consists eighteen short stories. In 2014, he was awarded Best Book award by the Jammu and Kashmir Academy of Art, Culture and Languages for one of his uncertain books.
