= Kashmir Literature Festival =

Kashmir Literature Festival is a writers' festival of Jammu and Kashmir focused on promotion of literature such as poetry and cultural heritage through literary dialogues, debates and readings. It was first scheduled to be held at Delhi Public School, Srinagar in September 2011 in the history of Jammu and Kashmir, however it was later cancelled after some writers allegedly protest against the organisers, citing the event will represent the Kashmir issue in such a manner that could portrait the Kashmir conflict as "normalcy" in the region.

== Events ==
The first event was titled Harud (autumn) and the second event was titled Sounth (spring) which was scheduled to be held in February 2015 in collaboration with Doordarshan and Radio Kashmir. The second event was held by the government of Jammu and Kashmir after it established its association with NGOs. It was focused on art, literature, media, and cinema among others.

== See also ==
- Jaipur Literature Festival
- Karachi Literature Festival
