= Navreh =

Kashmiri New Year

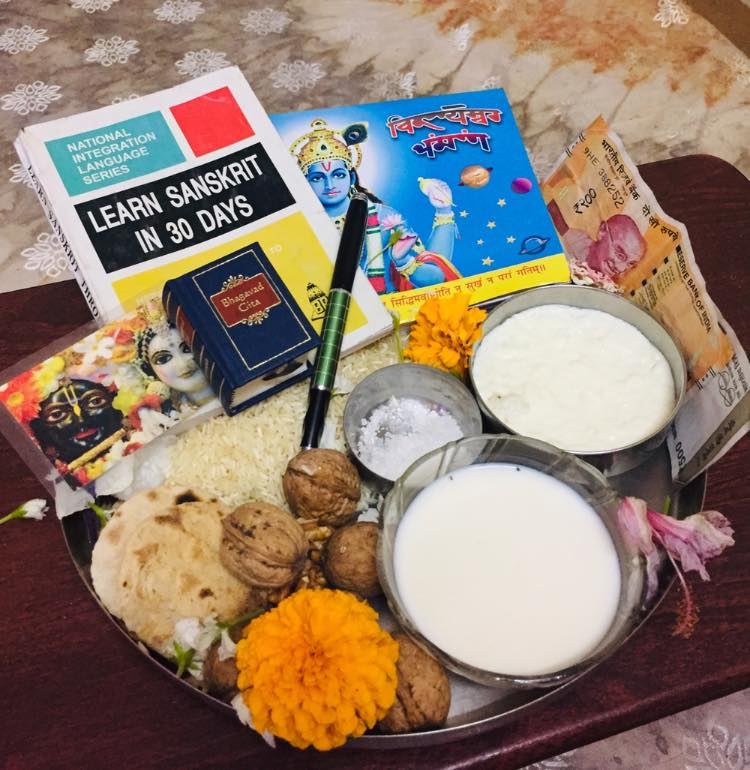
- A Navreh Thaal marks the beginning of the new year
- Also called: Kashmiri New Year
- Observed by: Kashmiri Hindus
- Type: Social, Cultural, Religious
- Celebrations: Rituals
- Date: Chaitra Shukla Pratipada
- Frequency: Annual
- Related to: Chaitra Navaratri, Ugadi, Gudi Padwa

Explanatory note on Hindu festival dates
- The Hindu calendar is lunisolar but most festival dates are specified using the lunar portion of the calendar. A lunar day is uniquely identified by three calendar elements: māsa (lunar month), pakṣa (lunar fortnight) and tithi (lunar day). Furthermore, when specifying the masa, one of two traditions are applicable, viz. amānta / pūrṇimānta. If a festival falls in the waning phase of the moon, these two traditions identify the same lunar day as falling in two different (but successive) masa. A lunar year is shorter than a solar year by about eleven days. As a result, most Hindu festivals occur on different days in successive years on the Gregorian calendar.

Navreh (Kashmiri pronunciation: [naʋ rʲah]) or Kashmiri New Year is the celebration of the first day of the Kashmiri new year by Kashmiri Hindus, with the largest Kashmiri Hindu community being the Kashmiri Pandits. Kashmiri Pandits dedicate Navreh festival to their Goddess Sharika, a form of Goddess Durga or Shakti, and pay homage to her during the festival. It takes place on the first day of the bright half (Shukla Paksha) on the month of Chaitra (March–April) of the Kashmiri Hindu calendar.

== History ==
According to the legend, Mother Goddess Sharika's dwelling was on Sharika Parvata (Hari Parbat) where the celebrated Sapta Rishis gathered. On the auspicious day of 1st Chaitra, as the first ray of sun fell on Chakreshwari and paid honor to her, this moment is considered the beginning of New Year and the Saptarishi era for astrologers. Kashmiri Hindu Tradition and astronomical calculations date the beginning of this era to 3076 BC.

== Rituals ==
The rice and coins represent our daily bread and wealth, the pen and paper a reminder of the quest for learning, the mirror represents retrospection. The calendar signals the changing time and the Deity the Universal Constant, and they together are a reminder of the constancy of changing time. The bitter herb is reminiscent of life's bitter aspects, to be taken in stride alongside the good. The bitter herb ‘wye’ is usually eaten with walnuts to bring wholeness of life's experiences in the admixture.

Symbolism aside, the consumption of this bitter herb has also been practiced by Native American cultures as well as by some of the American transcendentalist philosophers for various reasons.

After seeing (darshan) the thali, each person takes a walnut to be thrown into a river.

== See also ==
- Kashmiri Pandits
- Kashmiri Hindus
- Kashmiri Hindu festivals
- Mela Patt
