= Nowgong =

Nowgong can refer to:

- Naogaon District, Bangladesh
- Nagaon, a city in Nagaon district, Assam, India
  - Nowgong (Lok Sabha constituency)
  - Nowgong College
  - Nowgong Girls' College
  - Nowgong Law College
- Nowgong, Chhatarpur, a city and former military center, Chattarpur District, Madhya Pradesh, India

== See also ==
- Nagaon (disambiguation)
