= Rashid Nazki =

Kashmiri poet, professor (1931-2016)

- Born: Abdul Rashid Nazki; September 8, 1931; Bandipora, Jammu and Kashmir
- Died: January 6, 2016 (aged 84); Sher-i-Kashmir Institute of Medical Sciences, Srinagar
- Resting place: Bandipora, Jammu and Kashmir
- Education: MA; Kashmiri
- Alma mater: University of Kashmir
- Occupations: Scholar, poet, critic
- Writing career
- Pen name: Rashid Nazki
- Language: Kashmiri; Urdu; Persian; Arabic
- Years active: 1955–2016
- Genres: Literature, Language
- Subjects: Sufism, Mysticism

Professor Rashid Nazki (born Abdul Rashid Nazki; 18 September 1931 – 6 January 2016), was a Kashmiri poet, teacher, author, critic and the founder of the Adbi Markaz Kamraz Jammu and Kashmir, a nonprofit literary organization of the Jammu and Kashmir state dedicated to promote Kashmiri language and literature. He wrote biography of Islamic Prophet Muhammad, leading him to become the first Kashmiri writer to cover the life of Muhammad.

In 1999, he received the Sahitya Akademi Award in Kashmiri for his collection Vahraat. He wrote numerous books in Kashmiri and Urdu languages and later, he was appointed to the Sahitya Akademi as a reviewer for the organisation's first volume of the encyclopedia, the reference work of the Indian writers compiled by the organisation.

== Biography ==
He earned his Master of Arts in Kashmiri from the University of Kashmir and subsequently became the first Kashmiri student to receive a PhD for his thesis on "Mystic Trends in Kashmiri and Urdu Poetry", which revolves around mysticism, Kashmiri and Urdu poetry.

After serving as a teacher, he served at Jammu and Kashmir Academy of Art, Culture and Languages.

In 1975, he served as an editor at the Jammu and Kashmir Academy of Art Culture & Languages until he was appointed as chief editor. In 1980, he served at Kashmir University until he retired as a professor in early 90s. In 1976, he served as a member of Bharatiya Jnanpith, convener Iqbal Centenary, Shaikul Aalam Centenary, and Lal Ded Centenary which are officially sponsored by Jammu and Kashmir Academy of Art Culture and Languages. In the later years of his career, he was appointed as in-charge seminars and Member Consultative Committee of Kashmir University's post-graduate department.

He translated Allama Iqbal's Asrar-i-Khudi, Javid Nama, Zabur-i-Ajam, Bali-Jabriel, Payam-i-Mashriq, Qaseeda Burda, and Kuliyat-i-Nadim of Abdul Ahmad Nadim.

=== Personal life ===
His parents died when he was eight and was raised by his brother-in-law. After his matriculation result was declared, he was appointed as a teacher in state primary school. He had four sons and a daughter; however, his wife and two sons died in a grenade blast on 15 March 1992, leading him to leave literary work.

== Death and legacy ==
He was suffering from chronic condition and was subsequently admitted to hospital for medical treatment. On 6 January 2016, he died at Sher-i-Kashmir Institute of Medical Sciences (SKIMS). He is buried in Bandipora next to his two sons and wife. In 2015, Adbee Markaz Kamraz released a special edition of its biannual academic journal called Praave aimed at to highlight the life and work of Nazki.

== Awards and honours ==
| Year | Award | Nominated work | Result | Note | Ref. |
|---|---|---|---|---|---|
| 1999 | Sahitya Akademi Award | Vahrat | Won | Awarded for his prominent poetic collection Vahrat (also spelled Vahraat). | |
| 2005 | Certificate of Honour | Literature | Won | Awarded by then President of India APJ Abdul Kalam in recognition of his contribution to poetry | |
| 2008 | State Cultural Academy Award | Kashmiri literature | Won | Awarded by the government of Jammu and Kashmir on Republic Day in recognition of his contribution to Kashmiri poetry | |
