= Marghoob Banihali =

Indian writer (1937–2021)

- Born: 5 March 1937; Bankoot, Banihal
- Died: 27 April 2021 (aged 84); Srinagar, Kashmir
- Notable awards: Sahitya Akademi Award

Ghulam Mohammed Giri (5 March 1937 – 27 April 2021) also known by his pen name Marghoob Banihali was a Kashmiri poet from Bankoot, Banihal, in the state of Jammu and Kashmir.

== Personal life ==
Marghoob lost his mother when he was 8, and father when he was 14. He worked in various capacities at the University of Kashmir, in the Department of Kashmiri Language, the Department of Central Asian Studies, and the Iqbal Institute.

== Death ==
Marghoob Banihali died on 27 April 2021 at his home in Srinagar.

== Literary work ==
Banihali was awarded the Sahitya Akademi Award for Kashmiri literature in 1979 for his collection of poetry - Partavistan. He returned his Sahitya Akademi award against the rising intolerance and communal violence in the state of Jammu and Kashmir that resulted in the death of Zahid Bhat, a youth from Batengoo in South Kashmir.

== Awards and notable achievements ==
- Sahitya Academy Award for Kashmiri literature (1979), for Partavistan

== See also ==
- List of Sahitya Akademi Award winners for Kashmiri
