= Ladishah =

Musical style and genre

- Stylistic origins: Folk; Medieval; ballad; comedy; melody; satire; Hindustani
- Cultural origins: Kashmir
- Typical instruments: Dhukar
- Derivative forms: Shahr Ashob

Regional scenes
- Jammu and Kashmir and Ladakh

Ladishah (also spelled Ladi Shah or Laddi Shah) is a storytelling musical genre originated in Jammu and Kashmir with its roots in traditional and humorous folk singing originally sung by minstrels while locally wondering from one place to another. It is usually sung in Kashmiri language to express anguish or to entertain people in a rhythmic form primarily revolves around political, social and cultural issues in the form of ballad or melodious satire. It is identified when an entertainer raises their concerns in the form of humorous and melody singing without a voice break at some occurrences. It is sung with a musical instrument called dhukar, a traditional instrument consisting of two metal rods. Sometimes, an artist sings without a musical instrument.

Encompasses the medieval music, a ladishah singer literally acts as a communicator in a society to convey their message to the people either for public entertainment purpose or to address political views, social consciousness or cultural competence without practicing false consciousness and parody music. In broad sense, a ladishah artist is also referred to as a "street performer" or "historical describer" depending on lyrics.

== History ==
Ladishah genre originally emerged as a popular lyrics narrating with a combination of situational ballad, humorous and melody tone in Jammu and Kashmir princely state around eighteenth or nineteenth century. It has its roots in the culture of Kashmir written and narrated by the same entertainer. Literary associated with Kashmiri literature, it was initially used to criticise the rulers engaged in human rights abuse. Some local people believe that ladishah songs were used to be sung during the harvest season particularly exercised by nomads to get food in return.

Over the times with modern music revolution, the genre became less popular or almost unknown to the people, and subsequently it declined due to Kashmir conflict, a war that triggered unrest since the military conflict started in the region.

=== Contemporary history ===
While ladishah was originally performed by male artists, in 2020, Syed Areej Safvi, a Kashmiri artist became the first woman in Kashmir to perform ladishah.

== Origin ==
Some historians regard this as a dependent genre, while Farooq Fayaz, a Kashmiri author and an associate professor of the University of Kashmir at History department identifies it as an independent genre of traditional singing. The genre, according to the department of History, was first sung or created by a Kashmiri singer from Lari village of Pulwama district. He belonged to Shah dynasty and people used to call him "Shah of Lari" and hence the genre became known as "Ladishah".

It is described by various literary figures in different opinions, making it difficult to track its academic records historically. Some poets, including Zareef Ahmad Zareef recognize the word "Ladishah" to have originated from the word "Ladi" means a row or line and the word "Shah" was used to describe Muslim rulers who reigned the Kashmir Valley over multiple occasions.

== Style ==
Ladishah is usually performed wearing traditional dress such as pheran on stages and streets in particular, and while it delivers critical commentaries and thinking on various subjects, dukar instrument is used to play a thin ringing sounds every time a word is produced by the singer.
