= Kashmiri Hindu festivals =

Festivals of Kashmiri Hindus

The religious festivals of the Kashmiri Pandits have Rigvedic roots. Some festivals of Kashmiri Pandits are unique to Kashmir. Some Kashmiri Pandit festivals are Herath (Shivaratri), Navreh, Zyeath-Atham (Jyeshtha Ashtami), Huri-Atham (Har Ashtami), Zarmae-Satam (Janmashtami), Dussehra, Diwali, Pan (Roth Puza / Vinayaka Tsoram / Ganesha Chaturthi), Gaad Batt, Khetsimavas (Yakshamavasya), Kava Punim, Mitra Punim, Tiky Tsoram, Gengah Atham, Tila Atham, Vyetha Truvah, and Anta Tsodah.

== Herath (Shivaratri) ==
An interesting fact about Kashmiri Pandit festivals, needing investigation, is that some of these are celebrated a day ahead of their celebration by Hindus in other parts of the country. Shivaratri, regarded as the most important festival of the community, for instance, is celebrated by them on trayodashi or the thirteenth of the dark half of the month of Phalguna (February–March) and not on chaturdashi or the fourteenth as in the rest of the country. The reason for it is that this long drawn festival that is celebrated for one full fortnight as an elaborate ritual is associated with the appearance of Bhairava (Shiva) as a jwala-linga or a linga of flame. Called 'Herath' in Kashmiri, a word derived from the Sanskrit 'Hararatri' the 'Night of Hara' (another name of Shiva), it has been described as Bhairavotsava in Tantric texts as on this occasion Bhairava and Bhairavi, His Shakti or cosmic energy, are propitiated through Tantric worship. According to the legend associated with the origin of the worship, the linga appeared at pradoshakala or the dusk of early night as a blazing column of fire and dazzled Vatuka Bhairava and Rama (or Ramana) Bhairava, Mahadevi's mind-born sons, who approached it to discover its beginning or end but miserably failed. Exasperated and terrified they began to sing its praises and went to Mahadevi, who herself merged with the awe-inspiring jwala-linga. The Goddess blessed both Vatuka and Ramana that they would be worshipped by human beings and would receive their share of sacrificial offerings on that day and those who would worship them would have all their wishes fulfilled. As Vatuka Bhairava emerged from a pitcher full of water after Mahadevi cast a glance into it, fully armed with all his weapons (and so did Rama), he is represented by a pitcher full of water in which walnuts are kept for soaking and worshipped along with Shiva, Parvati, Kumara, Ganesha, their ganas or attendant deities, yoginis and kshetrapalas (guardians of the quarters) - all represented by clay images. The soaked walnuts are later distributed as naivedya. The ceremony is called 'vatuk barun' in Kashmiri, which means filling the pitcher of water representing the Vatuka Bhairava with walnuts and worshipping it.

The Poice dishes, mainly of meat and fish but also vegetarian as an option, are cooked as sacrificial food and partaken of by the worshipper and his family after being symbolically offered to the whole host of deities and attendant deities associated with Shivaratri. This is essential for everyone, the related texts emphasize. Those who do so are supposed to achieve progress and prosperity in life and have all their wishes fulfilled. But those who do not partake of the sacrificial food and do not break their fast after the Puja are bound to go to hell or take rebirth as lowly animals besides facing all kinds of disappointments in life, as related texts like the Shiva Samhita say:

"yo yagotsavam ulanghya tishthet nirashano vrato, jivan sa pashutameti mrito niryamapnuyat"

The symbolism of the aniconic earthen images, vagur, sonipotul and others representing Shiva, Ganesha, Parvati, yoginis and kshetrapalas, is not clear, as no available text has cared to have thrown any light on it. The vagur, specially worshipped on the dvadashi night itself, is perhaps a vestige of the rites of the Kaula cult as the manual on Shivaratri Puja suggests. It further indicates that these rites are related to Bhairava Puja: "atha dvadashyam pujanam Bhairavam namami", without elaborating. This has resulted in ridiculous etymologies of the names of the anicons being claimed by some people. The clay images are, nonetheless, essential to the performance of the ritual activity. As they are not made on the potter's wheel, their worship may have originated in an early period.

However, it is clear from what we have said above that there is difference in the way Shivaratri is celebrated by the Kashmiri Pandits and by Hindus elsewhere in the country. The Pandits not only celebrate it as Bhairavotsava one day earlier but also perform quite different rituals. Further, the tradition among Hindus in general is to strictly observe a fast on the Shiva Chaturdashi day. Even taking fruit or betel leaf is considered as violation of the fast.

"Shivayaga chaturdashyam ma vrate phala bhojanam", says the Padma Purana. The Markandeya Purana going a step ahead adds: "tambulam api na dadyat vrata bhanga bhayam priye". It is not that the Kashmiri Pandits do not celebrate on the chaturdshi day, but it is a day of feasting for them. The Nilamata Purana, it may be noted, clearly says that Shivaratri is celebrated on the chaturdashi of the dark fortnight of Phalguna.

== Khetchmaavas ==
There are several other festivals and Puja rites peculiar to Kashmiri Pandits, some of them dating back to hoary antiquity. One such distinctly Kashmiri festival is Khetsimavas or Yakshamavasya which is celebrated on the amavasya or the last day of the dark fortnight of Pausha (December–January). Commemorative of the coming together and co-mingling of various races and ethnic groups in prehistoric Kashmir, khichari is offered on this day as sacrificial food to Kubera indicating that the cult of Yaksha existed there from very early times. Khetsimavas appears to be a folk-religious festival - a pestle, or any stone in case that is not available, is washed and anointed with sandalwood paste and vermilion on this evening and worshipped taking it to be an image of Kubera. Khichari is offered to him with naivedya mantras and a portion of it is kept on the outer wall of his house by the worshipper in the belief that Yaksha will come to eat it.

== Navreh ==
Kashmiri Pandits celebrate their New Year's Day on the first day of the bright half of the month of Chaitra (Mar–Apr) and call it Navreh- the word derived from the Sanskrit nava varsha, literary meaning 'new year'. The Kashmiri Pandit families that migrated to the plains before 1900 also celebrate Navreh. On the eve of Navreh, a platter of unhusked rice with a bread, a cup of curd, a little salt, a little sugar candy, a few walnuts or almonds, a silver coin, a pen, a mirror, some flowers (rose, marigold, crocus, or jasmine) and the new panchanga or almanac is kept and seen as the first thing on waking up in the morning. This ritual is more or less the same as the Iranian Haft-Seen and Zoroastrian Nowruz. The Bhringisha Samhita says that the platter should be of bronze (kansyapatraka). The same ritual is observed on Sonth or the Kashmiri spring festival.

The Saptarshi Era of the Kashmiri Hindu calendar is believed to have started on this very day, some 5079 years ago. According to the legend, the celebrated Sapta Rishis assembled on the Sharika Parvata (Hari Parbat), the abode of the goddess Sharika, at the auspicious moment when the first ray of the sun fell on the Chakreshvara on this day and paid tribute to her. Astrologers made this moment as the basis of their calculations of the nava varsha pratipada, marking the beginning of the Saptarshi Era. Before their exodus Kashmiri Pandits would flock to Hari Parbat in thousands to celebrate Navreh.

== Zyeth Atham ==
On Zyeth Atham (Jyeshtha Ashtami in Sanskrit) or the eighth day of the bright half of Jyeshtha (May–June) a grand festival is held at Tulmul to celebrate the pradurbhava of the Goddess Ragya (Kshir Bhavani). Another festival is held at the shrine on Ashadha Ashtami with equal devotional fervour, the sacred spring of the shrine that miraculously changes its colour having been discovered on the saptami of that month. The devotees offer their worship, individually or in groups, waving lamp (Deep) and burning incense (dhupa) while reciting hymns to the Goddess and singing devotional songs. They make offerings of khir to her and of milk, loaf-sugar and flowers, which they offer into the spring. Ritually no specific procedure is prescribed for the Puja at Kshir Bhavani. The Bhringish Samhita simply says that the Devi, whose mantra is of fifteen syllables, accepts offerings of milk, sugar candy and ghee only - "sa kshira-kharuladi bhojanam".

== Tiky Tsoram ==
Tripura Sundari, literally meaning "she who is lovely in the three worlds", is one of the most important goddesses worshipped in the Tantric tradition in Kashmir. Her cult is particularly popular among the Tiku clan of Kashmiri Pandits who celebrate her festival on Tiky chorum(4th.maag one day before Vasant Panchami) . The surname 'Tiku' is derived from "trika", according to popular etymology. Her devotees believe that she combines in her form all three Goddesses, Mahalakshmi, Maha-sarswati and Mahakali, and all three of her cosmic functions. However, she is also worshipped by the entire Brahmin community in Kashmir and from very early times.

== Kaw/ Kaawe Punim ==
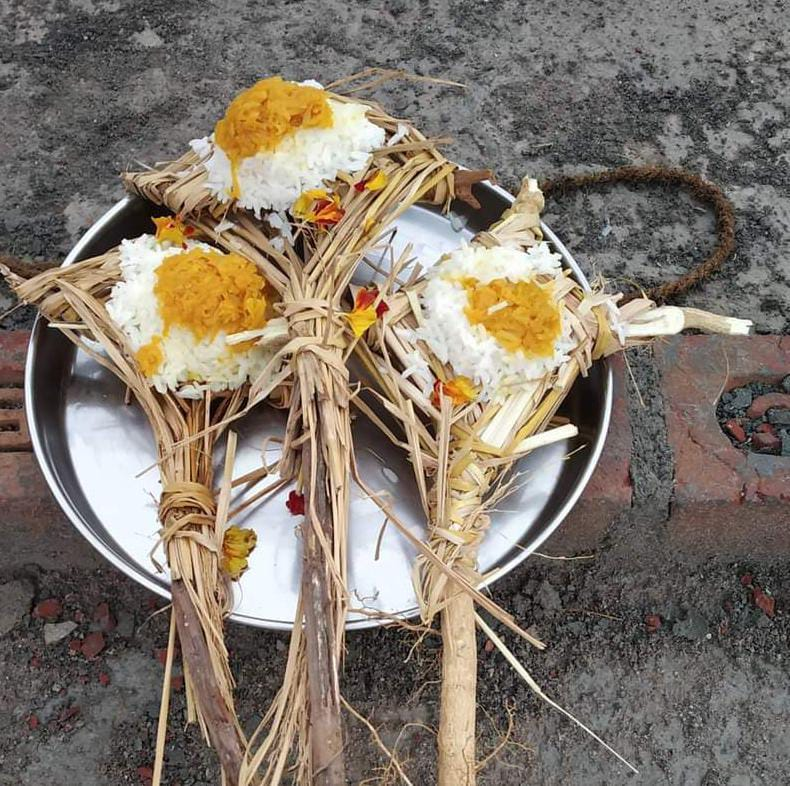
Special Structure prepared for serving food to the "kaw" (known as Kaw Patul)

Kaw (literally meaning "crow") and Punim (referring to "Purnimashi") is an ancestral festival honoring Kak Bhushandi, who in Hindu mythology is regarded as a major devotee of Rama, known for narrating the Ramayana to Garuda in the form of a crow. It is believed that the full moon day of lunar month of Magh Maas marks the birthday of crows (as well as Kak Bhushandi), along with the beginning of Shivratri festivities. Originally, Kaw Punim was a significant festival in the valley, but with the decline of influence of Hinduism, the festival ceased in popularity as well. Today, it is mostly celebrated by Kashmiri Pandits.

Crows are seen as representatives of ancestors as well as Lord Krishna, which is why on Kaw Punim, special home-cooked food such as khichri and yellow rice (referred to as "taher" in Kashmiri) is served to the kaw using a special square shaped structure of two sticks (3-4 ft. /1-2ft. each) with paddy hay in order to hold the sticks together. Food is served while singing a traditional rhyme:

..."Kaw batta Kawo, khe saeri kawo kaw ta kaewin saeti hyeth...Walaba sane nave lare, varey bata khe"... (“O” clever crow, “O” the lover of khichri crow, come to over new house, along with your loved one, be seated on our roof, and eat the rice for as long as you'd want)

Elders of the family observe a vrata and generally do not eat meat or non-vegetarian food on this occasion (eating "meat" is allowed in Kashmiri Shaivism). This festival emphasizes care for nature and care for culture, both being integral parts of the Kashmiri Pandit identity.

== Pann ==
Pann (literally meaning thread) is a festival originally associated with the spinning of newly produced cotton and worshipping the twin agricultural goddesses, obviously local, Vibha and Garbha to whom roths or sweet bread cakes were offered. Though Kashmir is not said to have a climate suitable for growing cotton, there is a strong tradition suggesting that it actually did grow there. The festival falls on the Ganesh Chaturthi (Vinayaka Tsoram) day and the worship of Lakshmi on this occasion seems to have been inducted later. Not that the worship dedicated to the local goddesses was appropriated wilfully by followers of the cult of Lakshmi, but there appears to have been a mix-up at some point of time. The twin goddesses themselves seem to have merged into one another assuming the identity of the folk deity Beeb Garabh Maj, whose very name- obviously a distortion - points to such a possibility. Beeb Garabh Maj is represented by a kalash or a water pot which is placed in the centre of the place where the Puja is to be performed, a cotton thread (Pann) being tied to its neck and handful of dramun or runner grass kept inside it, pointing again to its agricultural origin. A story is told at the Pann Puja which is quite similar to the Satyanaryana Katha, showing some sort of confusion between two different Pujas. Preparation of the roths and their distribution for ushering in prosperity and auspiciousness has, however, become an important part of Kashmiri Pandit religious life.

== Gaad Batt ==
Gaad Baat (literally meaning 'Fish and Rice') is another festival for Kashmiri Pandits which focusses on the dependence of Kashmiri Pandit festivals on the sacrificial offerings. This ritual is basically for the Guardian of the House, locally called as Gar Divta, for which the sacrificial offering of fish is offered. According to Kashmiri Pandits, Gar Divta has been perceived by many acts. Some people were even said to have communicated with Him. Gaad Batt is celebrated by having the fish sacrifice worshipped and offering the served rice-and-fish to Gar Divta, keeping it at a place that could be kept inaccessible for a night. He is known to keep our house away from evil spirits and protect us.

== Ksheer Bhawani Mela ==
Ksheer Bhawani also known as Kheer Bhawani is a temple shrine in Kashmir dedicated to Goddess Bhawani (Durga). The temple is constructed over a sacred spring; legend has it the water in the spring kept on changing when there's some danger in the valley Kashmiri Pandits has a keen belief in the Kheer Bhawani Temple. The temple is also linked with the great Indian epic Ramayana. It is believed that it was Lord Hanumana who brought Goddess Kheer Bhawani in Kashmir along with the Nagas. The temple is situated in the Tulmul village of Kashmir. Every year a grand fair is organised and pilgrims usually Kashmiri Pandits come to pay their obeisance to Goddess Bhawani. Also, a grand temple is built in Jammu in the Janipur area in accordance with the Kheer Bhawani temple of Kashmir. A grand fest is also organised in Jammu as well.

== Ancient Kashmiri Pandit festivals ==
Till the 11th century AD, the Kashmiri Pandits celebrated Mitra (Mithra) Punim, on the fourteenth (full moon) night of the bright fortnight (shukla paksha) of the Hindu autumn month of Ashvin or Ashwayuja. On this night, they remembered Mitra (Mithra), the patron divinity of honesty, friendship, contracts and meetings, by lighting a diya for him. The next morning was called Mitra Prabhat (Bamdad-e-Mithra), or the Morning of Mitra. Lotuses, rose petals and marigolds, washed in the water of the rivers Vitasta (now called Vyeth or Jhelum), along with walnuts, fruits and milk or milk-based sweets, were kept on a decorated platter in the honor of Mithra. Children were bathed in the same Vitasta(Vyeth) river and dressed in bright red, orange, or yellow silk robes, representing the radiance of Mithra's glory. Games were organized for children so that they were encouraged to forge new friendships. Clothes and quilts were donated to the needy and the fruits, nuts, and milk-sweets placed on the Mithra platter were shared with them. Nadir (lotus stem) was cooked on this day. In the Vedas, mitra also refers to the morning sun.

== See also ==
- List of Hindu festivals
- Mela Patt
