= Culture of Kashmir =

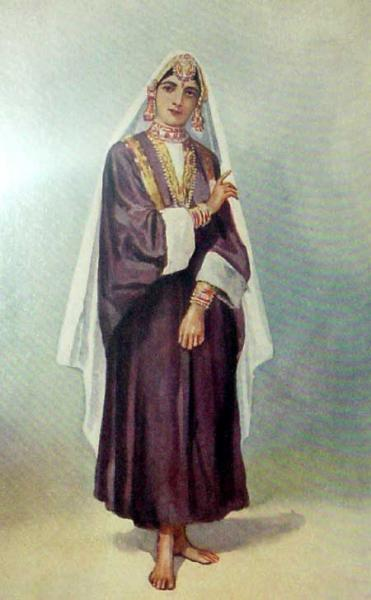
Kashmiri Pandit woman in traditional Kashmiri attire

The culture of Kashmir encompasses the spoken language, written literature, cuisine, architecture, traditions, and history of the Kashmiri people, native to the Kashmir Valley of Jammu and Kashmir, India. Kashmiri culture is historically influenced by Hinduism, then by Buddhism, and later also by Persianite and Central Asian cultures, after centuries of Islamic rule.

== Early history ==
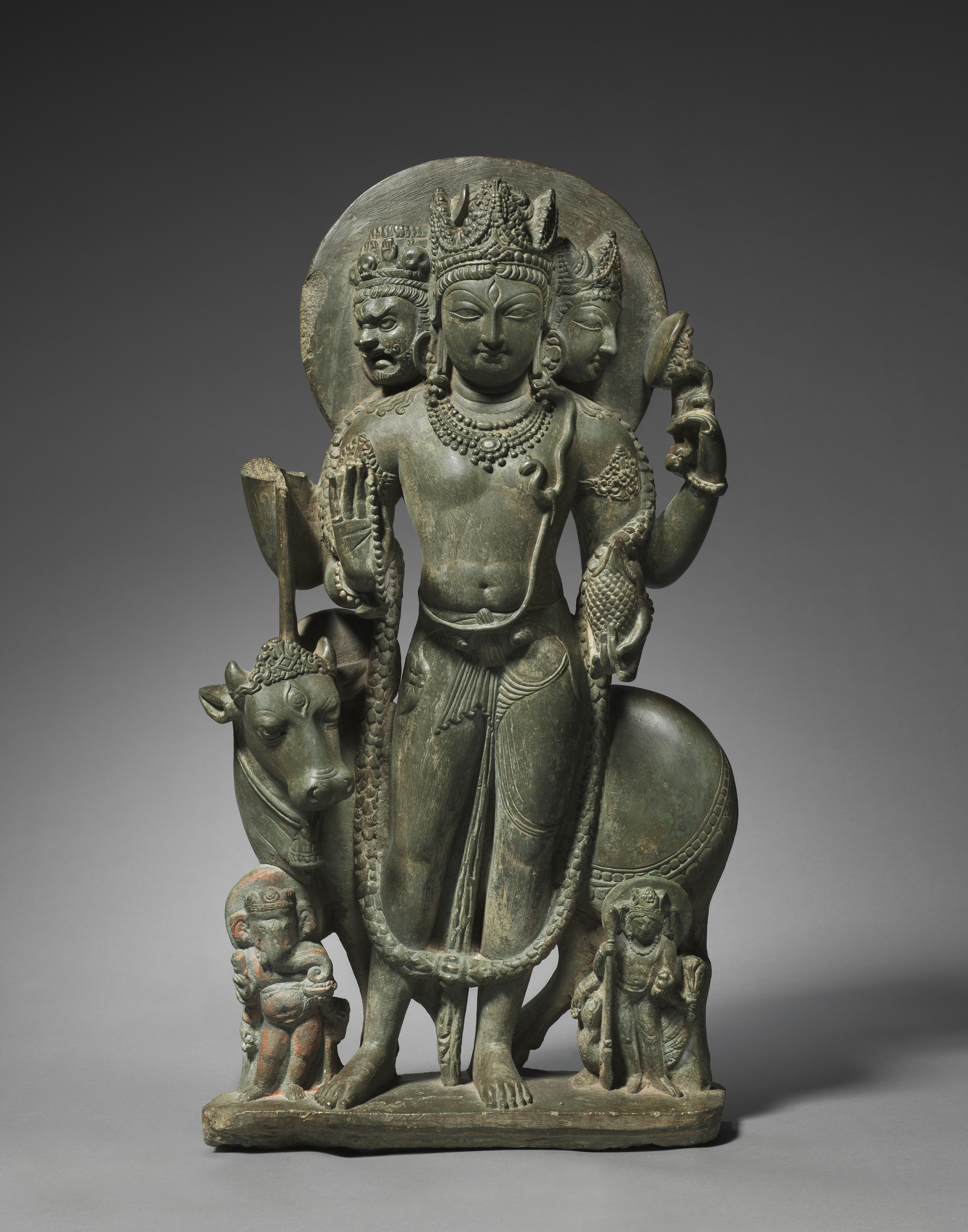
Schist statue of Shiva Mahadeva, Northern India, Kashmir, 8th century, Cleveland Museum of Art.

Vedic art and culture grew in Kashmir, and some early Vedic hymns were composed there.

The Bharata Natya Shastra, which is notable as an ancient encyclopedic treatise on the arts which has influenced dance, music and literary traditions in Indian culture, originated in Kashmir.

2nd century BC writer Patanjali compiled his compendium on Yoga in Kashmir.

The Panchatantra is also said to have originated in this region.

At the time when Pali was the primary language for Buddhist literature in the rest of India, all the Buddhist literature produced in Kashmir was in Sanskrit. Kashmiri women held high status in society, as Bilhana records that Kashmiri women were fluent both in Sanskrit and Pali.

Kosh Shastra, a work on the science of sex, second to the Kamasutra, was developed in Kashmir.

Some more examples of the major texts that also originated in Kashmir are the Vigyan Bharaiv Tantra, Yoga Sutras, Sapndi Karkika Tantra Loka and Para-Trisika-Vivarana.

== Cuisine ==
Rice is the staple food of Kashmiris and has been so since ancient times. Meat, along with rice, is the most popular food item in Kashmir. Kashmiris consume meat voraciously. Despite being Brahmins, most Kashmiri Hindus are meat eaters. Kashmiri beverages include Noon Chai or Sheer Chai and Kahwah or Kehew.

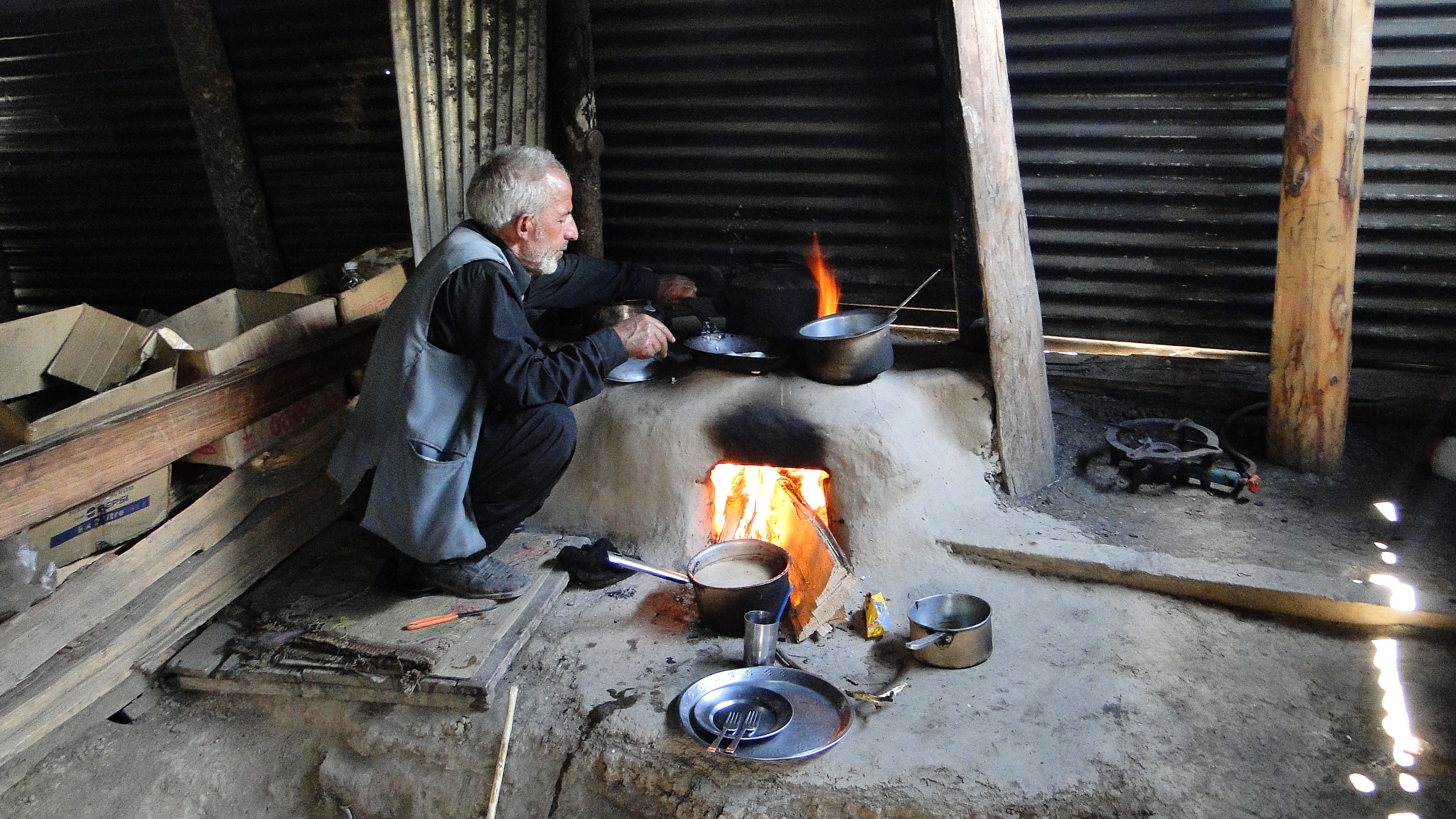
Kashmiri clay stove (Daan) being used to cook maggie and omelettes in Pahalgam in 2014.

The Kashmir Valley is noted for its bakery tradition. Bakers sell various kinds of breads with golden brown crusts topped with sesame and poppy seeds. Tsot and tsochvor are small round breads topped with poppy and sesame seeds, which are crisp and flaky; sheermal, baqerkhayn (puff pastry), lavas (unleavened bread) and kulcha are also popular. Girdas and lavas are served with butter. Kashmiri Bakarkhani has a special place in Kashmiri cuisine. It is similar to a round naan in appearance, but crisp and layered, and sprinkled with sesame seeds. It is typically consumed hot during breakfast.

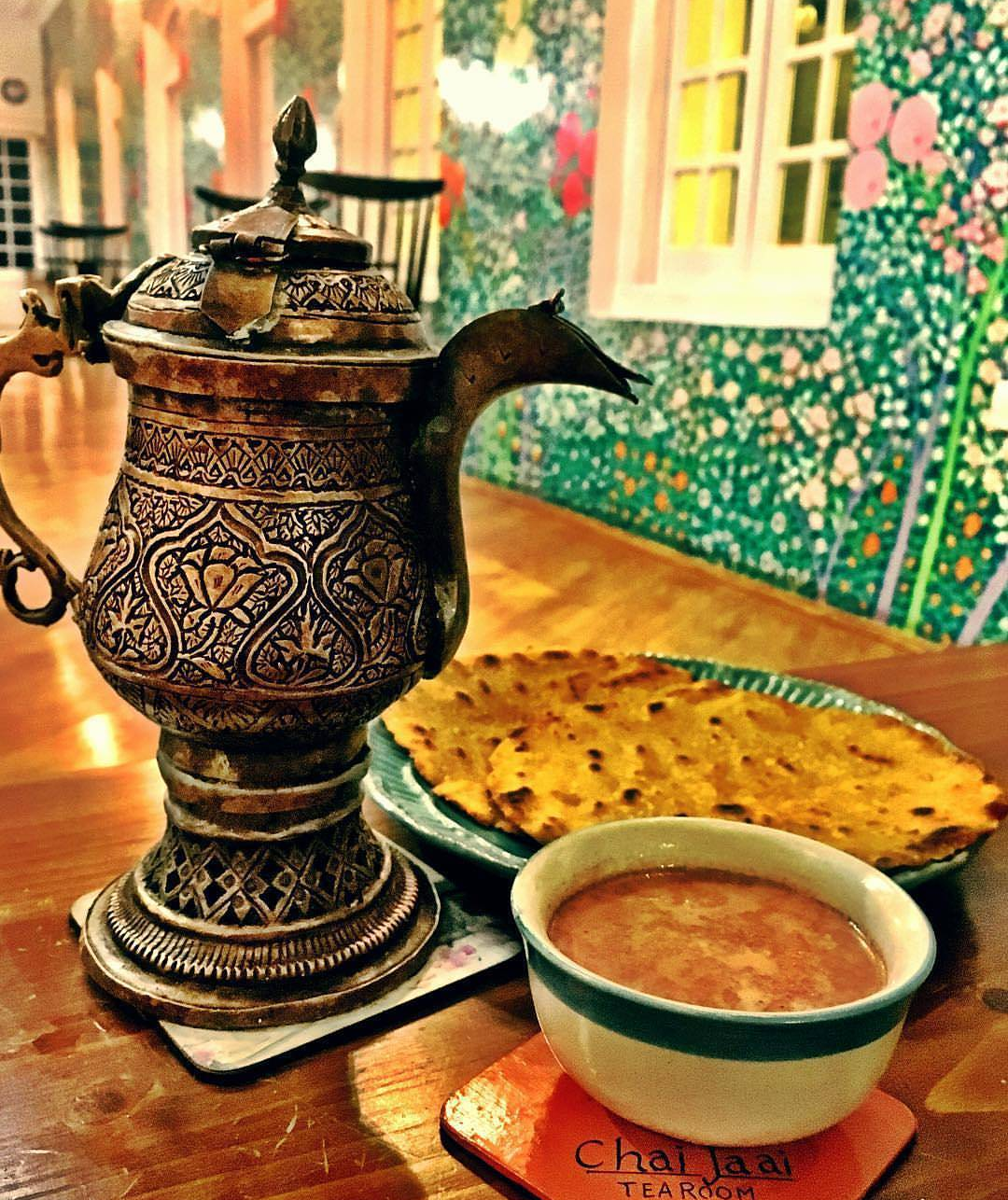
Kashmiri Samovar and Noon Chai

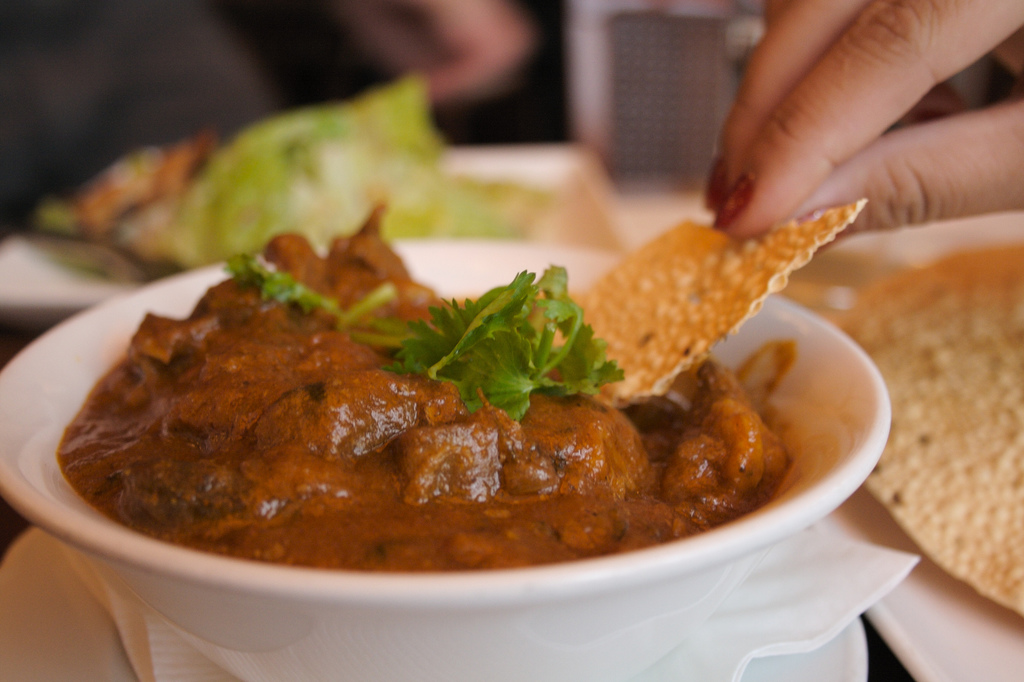
Rogan Josh

== Festivals ==
=== Kashmiri Hindus ===
Primary festivals of Kashmiri Hindus include:

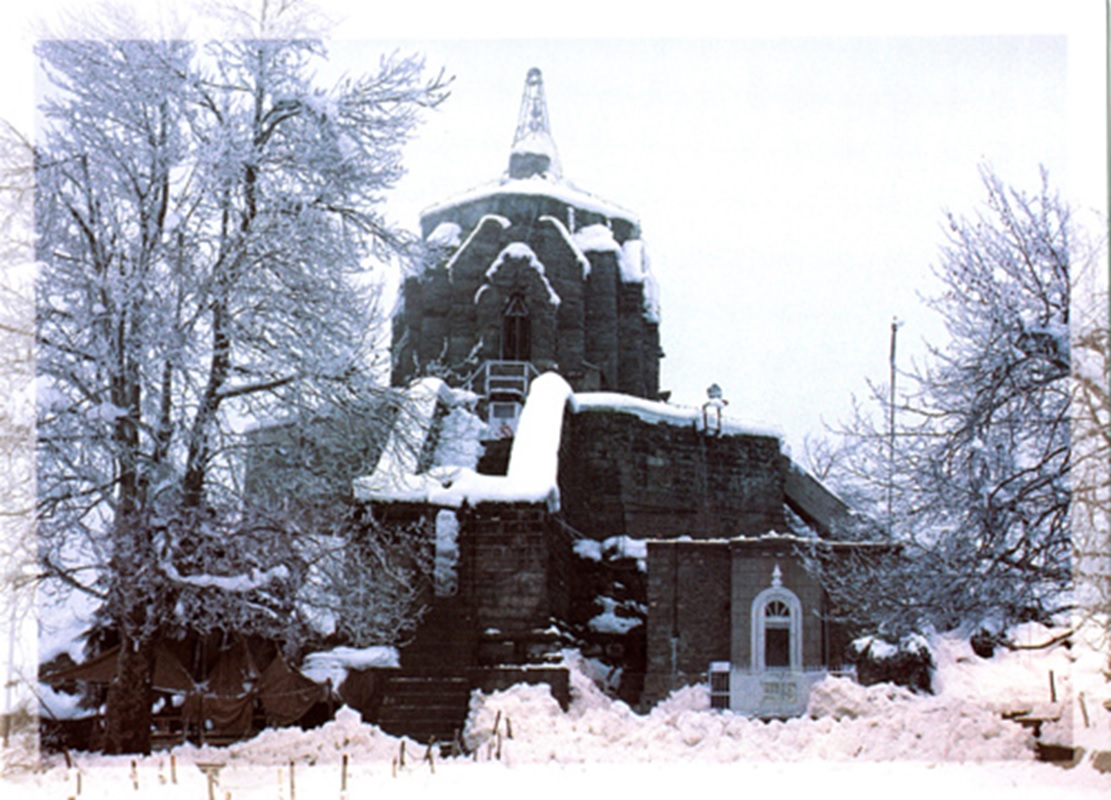
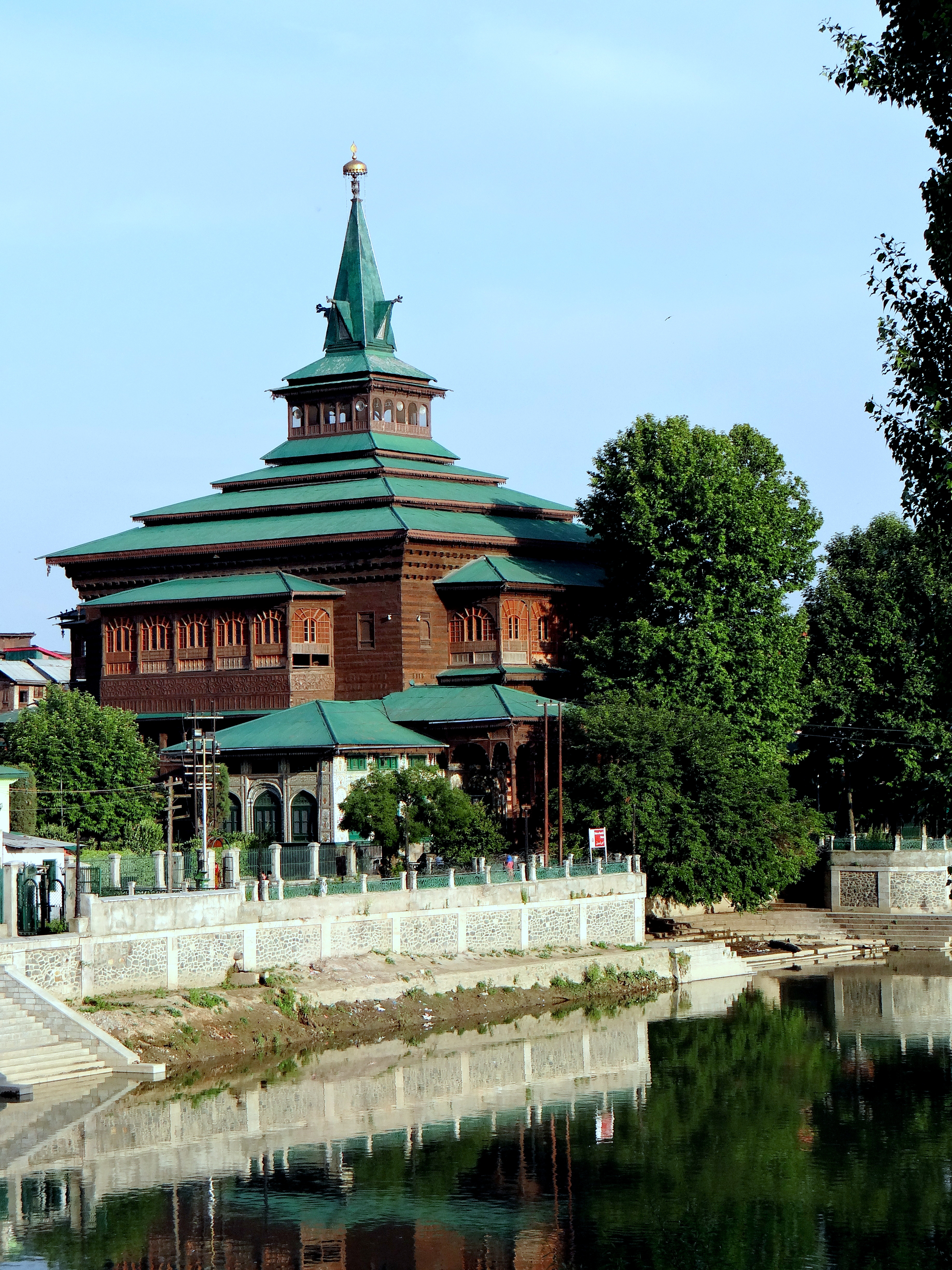
(left) 2,200 years old Shankaracharya Temple dedicated to Shiva; (right) Khanqah-e-Moula mosque construed around 1395 AD
- Herath
- Khetchmaavas
- Zyeth Atham
- Tiky Tsoram
- Pann
- Gaad Batt
- Navreh

=== Kashmiri Muslims ===
Primary festivals of Kashmiri Muslims include:

- Eid al-Adha
- Chaand Raat
- Eid al-Fitr
- Shab-e-Barat
- Shab-e-Meraj
- Eid al-Ghadir
- Eid-e-Meelad-un-Nabi

== Language and literature ==
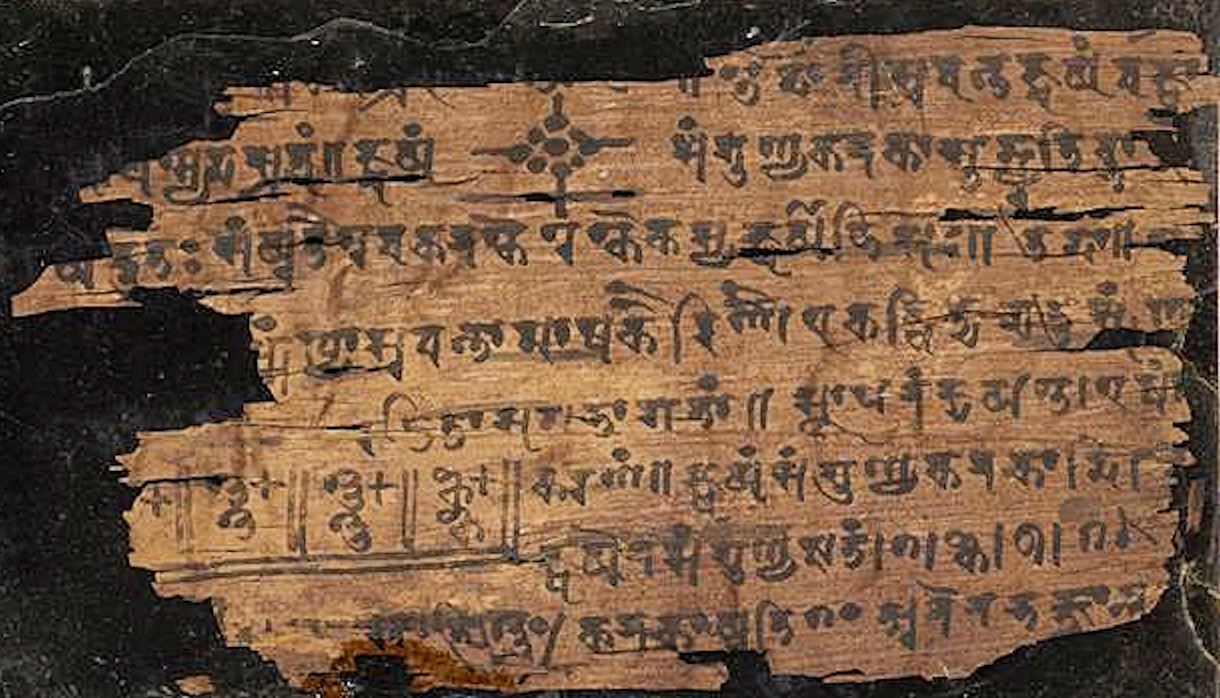
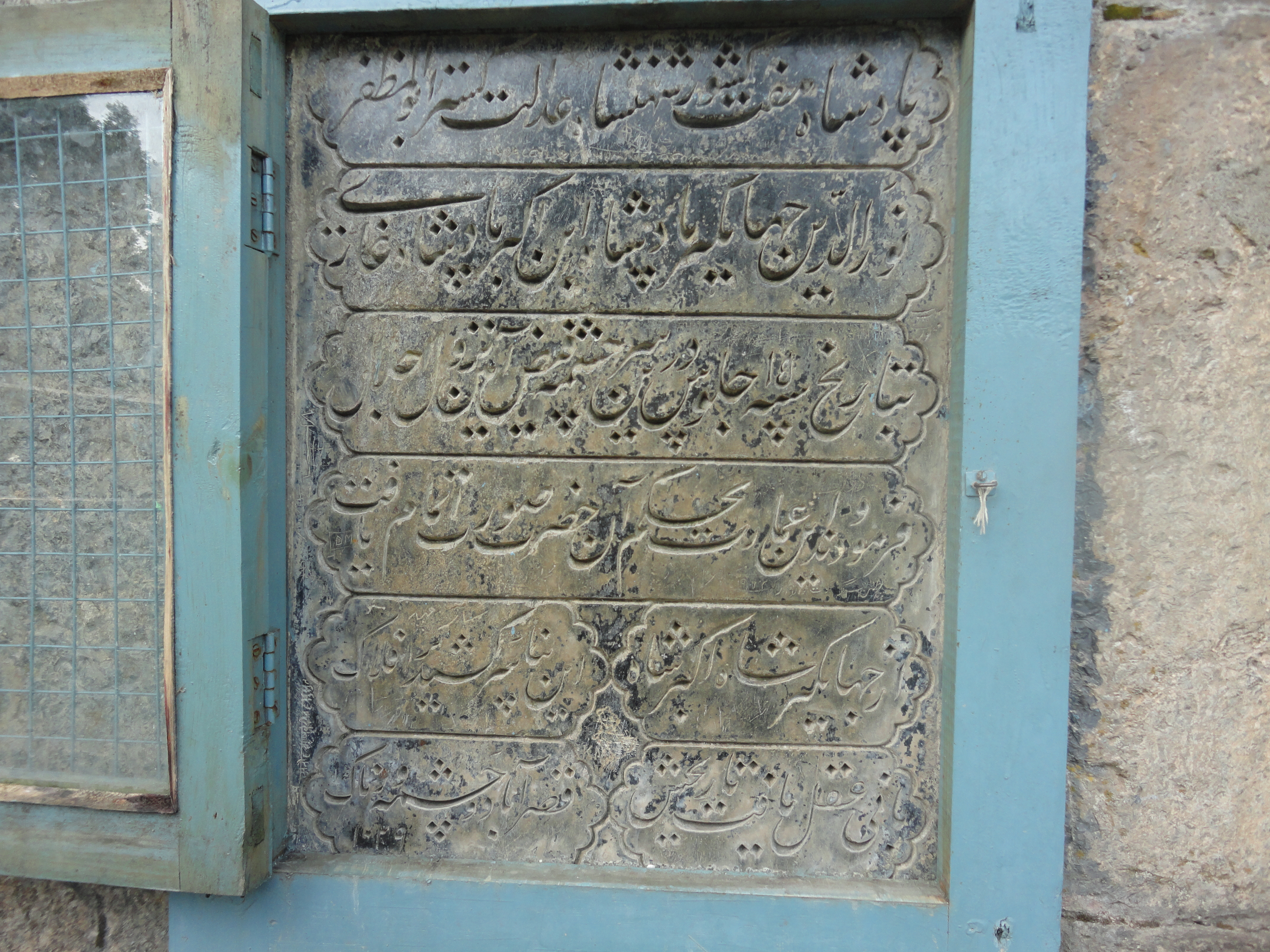
(left)An example of early Sharada script, in the Bakhshali manuscript; (right) Stone Slab in Verinag in Perso-Arabic script

Kashmiri or Koshur (کٲشُر, कॉशुर, 𑆑𑆳𑆯𑆶𑆫𑇀) is a language from the Dardic subgroup of Indo-Aryan languages, spoken by around 7 million Kashmiris, primarily in the Indian union territory of Jammu and Kashmir. There are also speakers in parts of the neighbouring Pakistani-administered territory of Azad Jammu and Kashmir.

The official languages of Jammu and Kashmir are Koshur, Dogri, Hindi-Urdu and English. Kashmiri is recognised as a regional language in the state and is also among the 22 scheduled languages of India.

Kashmiri has split ergativity and the unusual verb-second word order.

Although Kashmiri was traditionally written in the Sharda script, it is not in common use today, except for religious ceremonies of the Kashmiri Pandits.

Today it is written in Perso-Arabic and Devanagari scripts (with some modifications).

The Perso-Arabic script is recognised as the official script of Kashmiri language by the Jammu and Kashmir government and the Jammu and Kashmir Academy of Art, Culture and Languages.

Nowadays, the Perso-Arabic script has come to be associated with Kashmiri Muslims, while the Devanagari script has come to be associated with the Kashmiri Hindu community.

== Music ==
A short film on Kashmiri wedding, with Kashmiri music

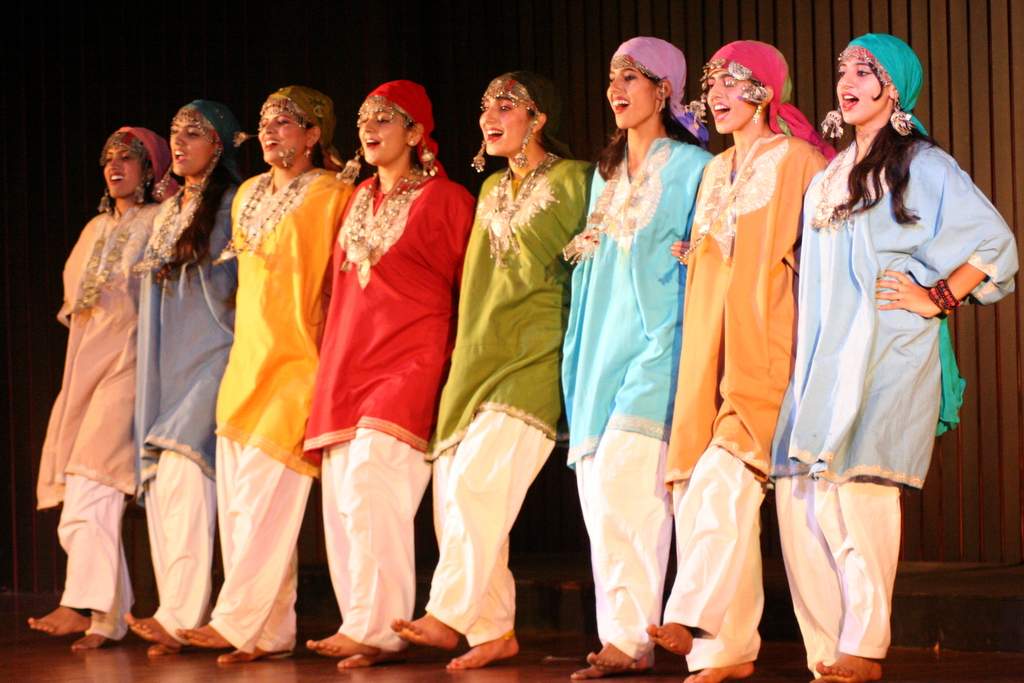
Kashmiri girls performing Rouf Dance in Delhi

=== Early history ===
The Bharata Natya Shastra is notable as an ancient encyclopedic treatise on the arts one which has influenced dance, music and literary traditions in India, originated in Kashmir.

=== Present day ===
Kashmiri Music primarily includes:

- Chakri
- Henzae
- Rouf or Wanwun
- Ladishah
- Sufiana Kalam (Kashmiri Classical)
