= Gudi Padwa =

Marathi and Konkani Hindu new year festival

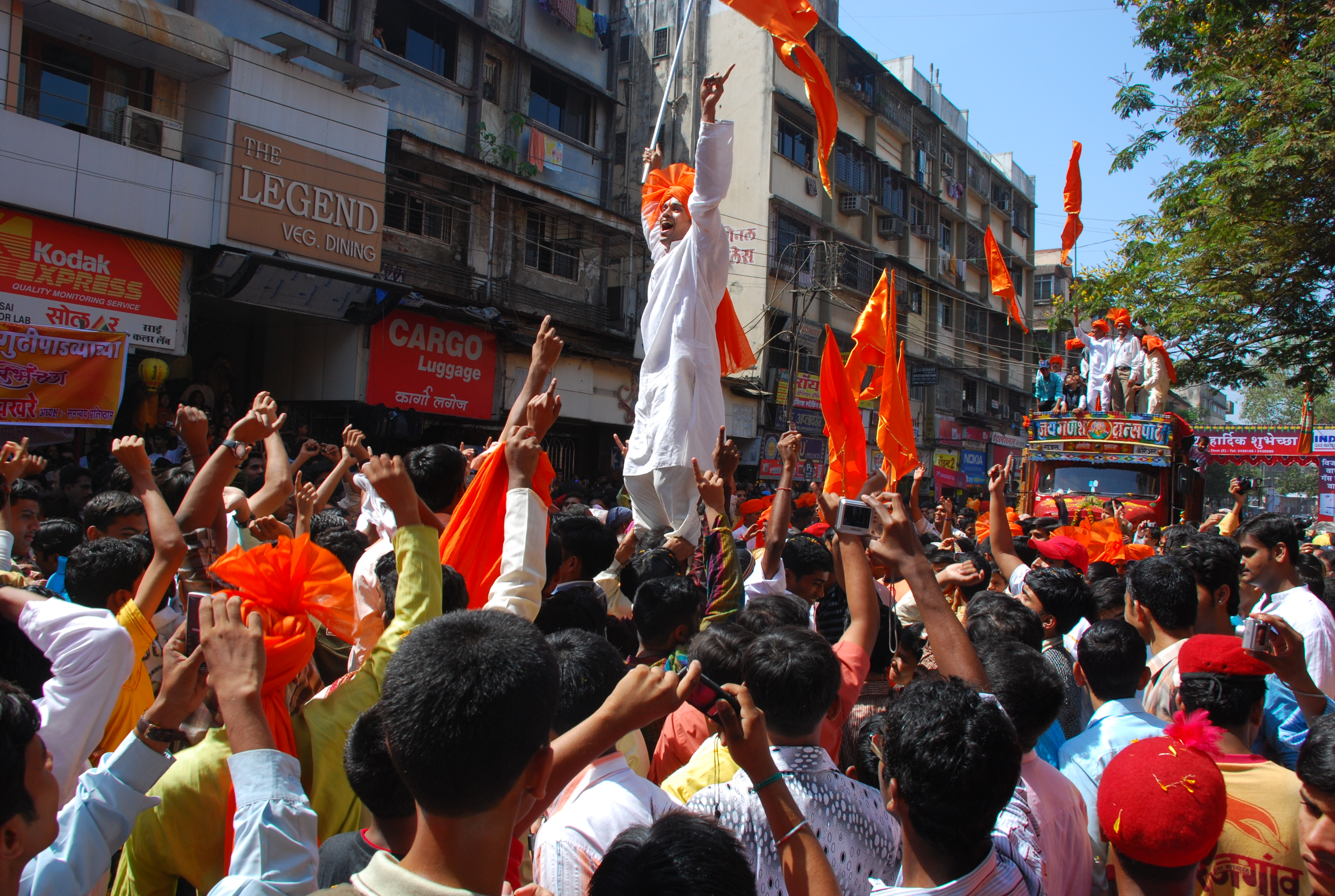
- A Gudi Padwa new year festive procession in Dombivli, Maharashtra
- Official name: Gudi Padwa
- Also called: Marathi New Year, Hindu New Year
- Observed by: Marathi and Konkani Hindus
- Type: Religious (Hindu), social, cultural
- Celebrations: 1 day
- Observances: People clean and decorate their houses with colourful rangolis and Gudis.
- Date: Chaitra Shukla Pratipada
- Frequency: Annual
- Related to: Ugadi, Cheti Chand

Explanatory note on Hindu festival dates
- The Hindu calendar is lunisolar but most festival dates are specified using the lunar portion of the calendar. A lunar day is uniquely identified by three calendar elements: māsa (lunar month), pakṣa (lunar fortnight) and tithi (lunar day). Furthermore, when specifying the masa, one of two traditions are applicable, viz. amānta / pūrṇimānta. If a festival falls in the waning phase of the moon, these two traditions identify the same lunar day as falling in two different (but successive) masa. A lunar year is shorter than a solar year by about eleven days. As a result, most Hindu festivals occur on different days in successive years on the Gregorian calendar.

Gudi Padwa is a spring festival marking the start of the lunisolar new year for Marathi and Konkani Hindus. It is celebrated in and around Maharashtra, Goa, and Daman at the start of Chaitra, the first month of the lunisolar Hindu calendar. The festival is characterised by colourful floor decorations called rangoli, a special gudi dhvaja, which is a sari or dhoti or other piece of cloth garlanded with flowers, mango, and neem leaves, and a sugar crystal garland called gathi, topped with upturned silver or copper vessels. The celebration also includes street gatherings, dancing, and festive foods.

In Maharashtra, the first day of the bright phase of the moon is called guḍhī pāḍwā (Marathi: गुढी पाडवा), pāḍvo (Konkani: पाडवो); pāḍya (Kannada: ಪಾಡ್ಯ); pāḍyami (Telugu: పాడ్యమి). Konkani Hindus variously refer to the day as sausāra pāḍavo or sausāra pāḍyo (सौसार पाडवो and सौसार पाडयो, respectively). Kannada Hindus in Karnataka refer to it as Yugādi/Ugadi (ಯುಗಾದಿ), while Telugu Hindus celebrate the same occasion as Ugadi (ఉగాది). Sindhi people celebrate the day as Cheti Chand, and Kashmiri Pandits celebrate this day as Navreh.

However, this is not the universal new year for all Hindus. For some, such as those in and near Gujarat, the new year festivities coincide with the five-day Diwali festival, also known as Bestu Varas. For many others, the new year falls on Vaisakhi between 13 and 15 April, according to the solar cycle part of the Hindu lunisolar calendar and this is by far the most popular not only among Hindus of the Indian subcontinent but also among Buddhists and Hindus of Southeast Asia.

== Etymology ==
Gudi means 'flag'; according to Kittel, the term is of South Indian origin. The word pāḍavā is derived from the Sanskrit word pratipad for the first day of each fortnight in a lunar month, or the first day on which the moon appears after the "new moon" day (amāvāsya), and the first day after the full moon. A Gudi is also hoisted on this occasion, gives this festival its name. The term padva or padavo is also associated with Balipratipada.

== Significance ==
Gudi Padva signifies the arrival of spring and the reaping of rabi crops. The festival is linked to the day on which the Hindu god Brahma created time and the universe. To some, it commemorates the coronation of Rama in Ayodhya, after his victory over Ravana, or the start of the Shalivahan calendar, after he defeated the Huns in the first century. According to Anne Feldhaus, in rural Maharashtra, the festival is linked to Shiva's dance and the coming together of the community as they carry the Gudhi Kavads together to a Shiva temple.

== The guḍhī ==
Raising gudi is main ritual of Gudi Padwa

During Gudi Padwa, gudi (or gudhi) are arranged at every household. It is a bright, colourful silk scarf-like cloth tied at the top of a long bamboo. On top of it, one or more boughs of neem and mango leaves are attached with a garland of flowers. It is capped with a silver, bronze, or copper pot (handi or kalash), signifying victory or achievement.

Some temples are located on the top of hills, and groups work together to help reach the kavad to the top.

Some of the significances attributed to raising a gudi are as follows:

- It symbolises the victory of King Shalivahana and was hoisted by his people when he returned to Paithan.
- It symbolises Brahma's flag mentioned in the Brahma Purana, and may also represent Indra's flag.
- It is believed to ward off evil, invite prosperity and good luck into the house.

== Festivities ==
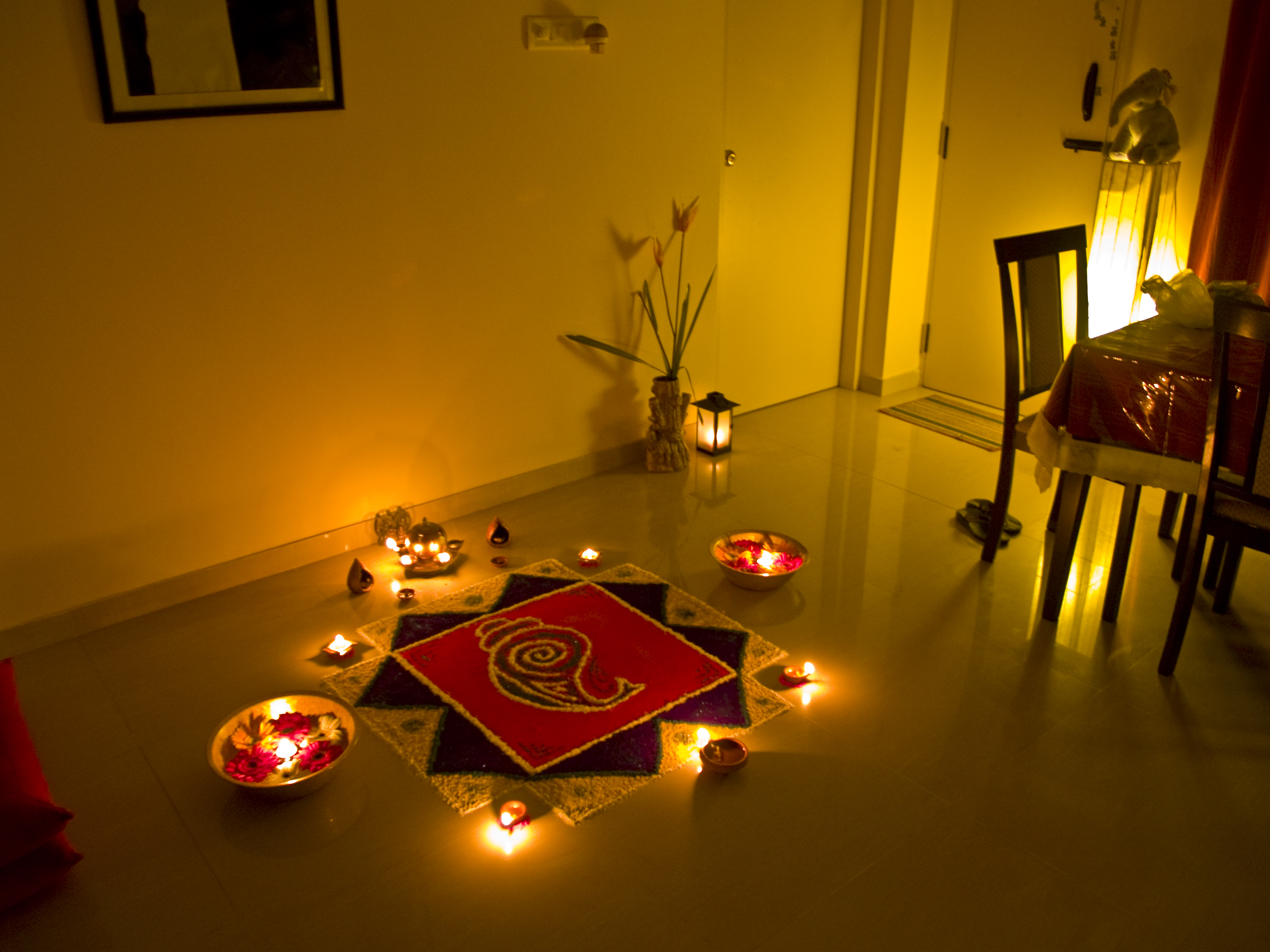
Rangoli made on Gudi Padwa

Traditionally, families prepare a special dish that mixes various flavours, particularly the bitter leaves of the neem tree and sweet jaggery (gud, gul). Additional ingredients include sour tamarind and astringent coriander seeds. This, like the pacchadi recipe used in Ugadi festival, is eaten as a reminder of life's sweet and bitter experience and a belief that the neem-based mixture has health benefits.

== Other names ==
The festival is also known as

- Cheti Chand among the Sindhi people
- Navreh among the Kashmiri Pandits in Jammu and Kashmir
- Samvatsar Padvo among Hindu Konkanis of Goa and Konkani diaspora in Kerala
- Ugadi among the south-Indian states of Karnataka, Andhra Pradesh and Telangana

== See also ==
- Astronomical basis of the Hindu calendar
- Hindu units of measurement
- Panchanga
- Shaka era
- Vikram Samvat
