= Khoni, Maharashtra =

Khoni
- City
- Location in Maharashtra, India
- Coordinates: 19.3113°N 73.0544°E
- Country: India
- State: Maharashtra
- District: Thane

Population (2001)
  - Total: 22,687

Languages
  - Official: Marathi
- Time zone: UTC+5:30 (IST)

Khoni is a village located in Kalyan tehsil of Thane district in Maharashtra, India. It is situated 8km away from sub-district headquarter Kalyan (tehsildar office) and 28km away from district headquarter Thane. As per 2009 stats, Khoni village is also a gram panchayat.

According to Census 2011, the location code or village code of Khoni is 553000. The village spans a total geographical area of 280 hectares. Dombivali is nearest town to Khoni village for all major economic activities, which is approximately 8km away.

When it comes to local governance, Khoni village is administered by a Sarpanch, the elected head of the village, in accordance with the Constitution of India and the Panchayati Raj Act. The village falls under the Kalyan Rural Vidhan Sabha constituency for state-level representation and the Kalyan Lok Sabha constituency for national parliamentary elections. The local administration is responsible for civic services and development within the village.

== Demographics ==
At the 2001 India census, Khoni had a population of 22,687. Males constituted 65% of the population and females 35%. Khoni had an average literacy rate of 67%, higher than the national average of 59.5%: male literacy was 72%, and female literacy was 68%. In Khoni, 14% of the population were under 6 years of age.

Khoni is situated on the Katai Naka Badlapur pipeline road.
