= Hajan =

- city
- Location in Jammu and Kashmir, India Hajan (India)
- Coordinates: 34.3°N 74.62°E
- Country: India
- State: Jammu and Kashmir
- District: Bandipora

Government
  - Type: Urban Local Bodies
  - Body: Municipal Committee Hajan
- Elevation: 1,556 m (5,105 ft)

Population (2001)
  - Total: 9,916

Languages
  - Official: Kashmiri, Urdu, Hindi, Dogri, English
- Time zone: UTC+5:30 (IST)
- Postal code: 193501
- Vehicle registration: JK15

Hajan is a town and a notified area committee in Bandipora district in the Indian union territory of Jammu and Kashmir.

== Geography ==
Hajan is located at 34.3°N 74.62°E. It has an average elevation of 1556 metres (5104 feet). Hajan is at a distance of 35 km towards north of Srinagar .

== Demographics ==
As of 2001 India census, Hajan had a population of 9916. Males constitute 52% of the population and females 48%. Hajan has an average literacy rate of 32%, lower than the national average of 59.5%: male literacy is 42%, and female literacy is 21%. In Hajan, 14% of the population is under 6 years of age. Hajan has a population of approximately 23,000 as of 9 December 2007. Public facilities provided are as Community Health Center providing facility all adjoining area's of Hajan town Govt. Degree College ITI Hajan educating youth various professional courses Tehsil Office Various private and Govt. schools Nearest tourist attraction Manasbal Lake
