= Abdul Khaliq Tak Zainagiri =

Kashmiri philanthropist, social activist, poet, and researcher

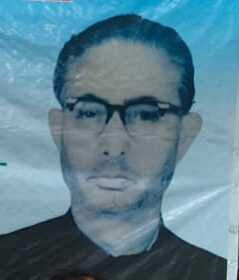
- 19 May 1924 – 24 July 1989
- Born: Abdul Khaliq Tak; 24 May 1924; Harda Shurus (now Zainagir), Sopore, Baramulla, Kashmir
- Died: July 24, 1989 (aged 65)
- Occupations: Philanthropist; social activist; poet; researcher
- Writing career
- Notable awards: Sahitya Akademi Award

Abdul Khaliq Tak (19 May 1924 – 24 July 1989), popularly known as Tak Zainagiri, was a Kashmiri philanthropist, social activist, poet, researcher, and founder of the Jammu and Kashmir Yateem Trust. He was a recipient of the Sahitya Akademi Award for Kashmiri literature and is remembered for his lifelong dedication to serving orphans, widows, and the destitute in Jammu and Kashmir. Often referred to as the "Edhi of Kashmir," Zainagiri's work focused on socio-cultural awakening and selfless humanitarian service.

== Early life ==
Abdul Khaliq Tak Zainagiri was born on 19 May 1924 in the village of Harda Shurus (now known as Zainagir) in the Sopore tehsil of Baramulla district, Jammu and Kashmir.

== Career and philanthropy ==
Zainagiri founded the Jammu and Kashmir Yateem Trust on 24 July 1972, which was formally registered in 1973.

The organisation is the oldest charitable trust in Jammu and Kashmir, operates 13 orphanages, 15 craft centers, and various welfare schemes across 80 branches in the Kashmir Valley, Jammu, and Ladakh.

Funded entirely by public donations, including Zakat and Sadqat, the Trust has spent crores on aiding the downtrodden without regard to caste, creed, religion, or region. Zainagiri served as its founder patron until his death, emphasising selfless service to humanity.

His work extended to socio-cultural initiatives, promoting education and cultural awareness in Kashmiri society. Zainagiri was also a dedicated poet and researcher, contributing to Kashmiri literature.

== Literary works ==
As a writer, Zainagiri authored notable works, including the book "Kashur Allaqa Wad Phera", which has been praised for its literary and cultural significance.

He received the Sahitya Akademi Award for his contributions to Kashmiri literature. His writings often reflected on social issues and his personal experiences in philanthropy.

== Death and legacy ==
Abdul Khaliq Tak Zainagiri died on 24 July 1989, coinciding with the founding date of the Yateem Trust.

His legacy continues through the Trust, now led by his son Zahoor Ahmad Tak. Annual commemorations mark his death anniversary, including literary forums organised by the Sahitya Akademi, such as the event on his 36th death anniversary in 2025, where scholars discussed his life, works, and the promotion of the Kashmiri language.

His son-in-law, Adv. Ab Rashid Hanjura, also continues humanitarian work through organisations like Islamic Relief and Research.
