= Nagaon, Raigad District =

Nagaon
- Village
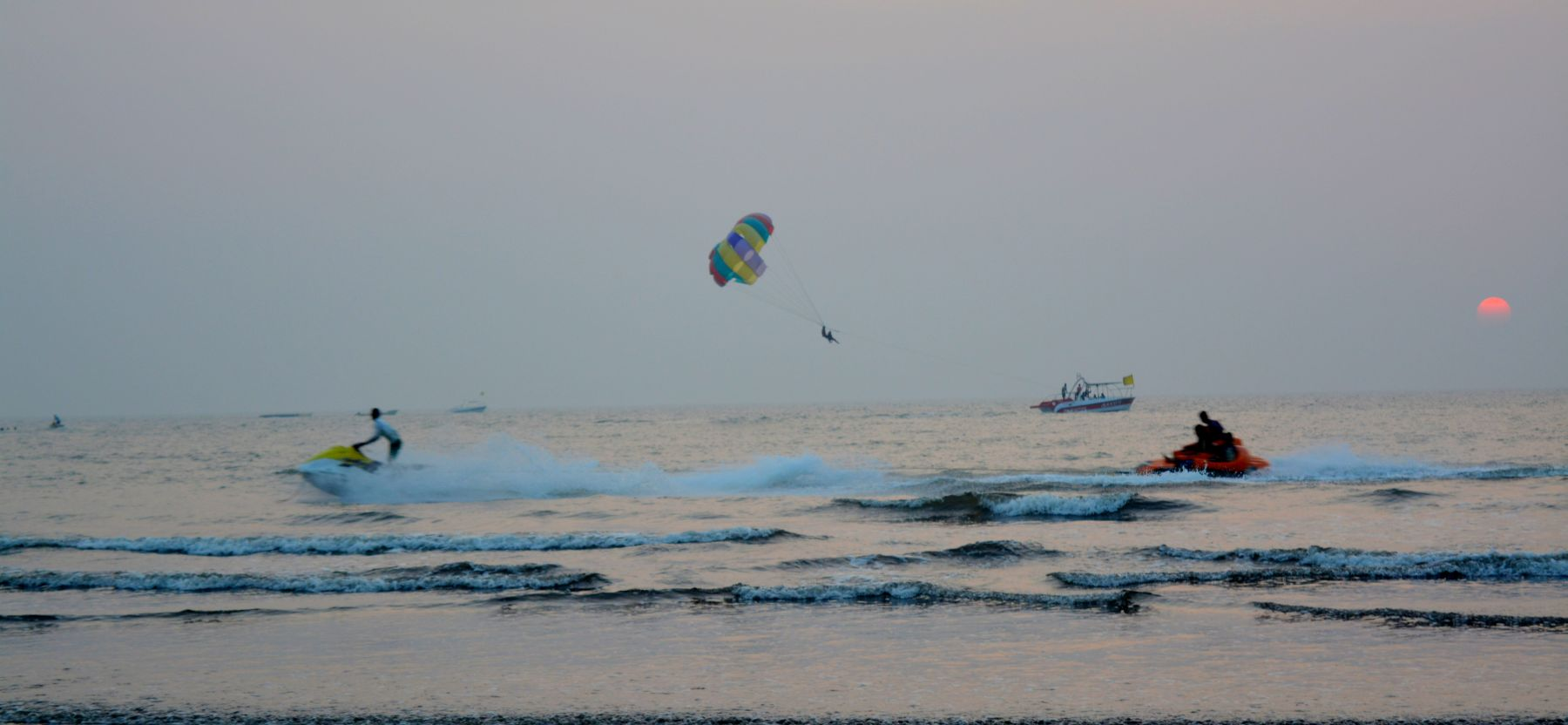
- Nagaon Beach

- Location in Maharashtra, India
- Coordinates: 18°26′30″N 72°54′20″E
- Country: India
- State: Maharashtra
- District: Raigad
- Elevation: 0 m (0 ft)

Population (2011)
  - Total: 4,977

Languages
  - Official: Marathi
- Time zone: UTC+5:30 (IST)
- Postal Index Number: 402 201
- Telephone code: 02141

Nagaon is a beach town on the shores of the Arabian Sea, in the North Konkan region of Maharashtra, India. It is located 9 km from Alibag and 114 km from Mumbai. Nagaon beach is popular mainly because of its cleanliness, water sport activities. The beach is around 3 km long. There are a few small hotels in Nagaon as the rest of the area is privately owned. Best option to stay here to stay in cottages owned by local people.

== Etymology ==
The Prakritized form of the Sanskrit name "Naggram" is mentioned as a name of Nagaon in the 15th-17th century Marathi-language text Mahikavatichi Bakhar, "gram" being the Shilahara-era suffix for a small village.

== Demographics ==
The Nagaon village has population of 4977 of which 2501 are males while 2476 are females as per Population Census 2011. In Nagaon village population of children with age 0-6 is 337 which makes up 6.77 % of total population of village. Average Sex Ratio of Nagaon village is 990 which is higher than Maharashtra state average of 929. Child Sex Ratio for the Nagaon as per census is 812, lower than Maharashtra average of 894.

Nagaon village has higher literacy rate compared to Maharashtra. In 2011, literacy rate of Nagaon village was 92.89 % compared to 82.34 % of Maharashtra. In Nagaon Male literacy stands at 95.98 % while female literacy rate was 89.81 %.

== Transport ==
=== Road ===
One can reach Alibag via Panvel - Pen (30 km away), which is on the Mumbai (78 km away) - Goa highway. While traveling on the Mumbai-Goa highway (NH-17), keep going straight at Wadkhal (or Vadkhal) (instead of taking left fork that goes to Goa. The distance is approximately 114 km from Mumbai.

=== Railways ===
The nearest rail railway station is at Pen. Through Pen, it is connected to Panvel and onwards to Mumbai and the Indian Railways network.

=== Boat services ===
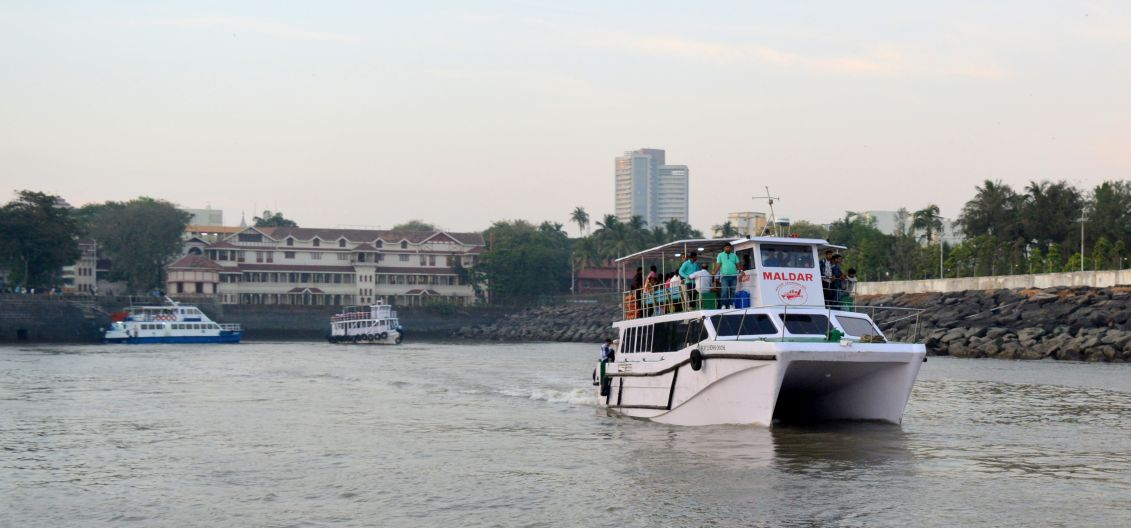
Mumbai Mandwa Ferry

The nearest jetty is Mandwa from where catamaran/ ferry services are available to Gateway of India, Mumbai. Another port in the vicinity is Rewas, from where a ferry service is available to Bhau cha Dhakka in Mumbai. There is also a jetty at Custom Bandar from where fishermen in Alibag set sail.
