= Mela Patt =

Mela Patt (Bhaderwahi: "Patte ru Kodd") is a three days festival held annually on Naga Panchami, symbolizing Nag Culture in Khakhal village in the Bhaderwah tehsil of Doda district, in the Jammu division of Jammu and Kashmir, India.

== Background ==
The festival Mela Patt is named after the Sanskrit term for silken cloth "Patt Vastra". During these three days, people from all backgrounds, regardless of caste and creed, actively participate in Mela Patt in large numbers. Mela Patt has its roots in the sixteenth century when the Mughal emperor Akbar awed by the spiritual power of Raja Nagpal, the ruler of Bhaderwah honoured him with substantial wealth as a gesture of respect to the serpent God Nag Raj Vasuki including metallic vessels, gold and silver ornaments, silk fabrics and musical instruments.
