= List of institutions of higher education in Jammu and Kashmir =

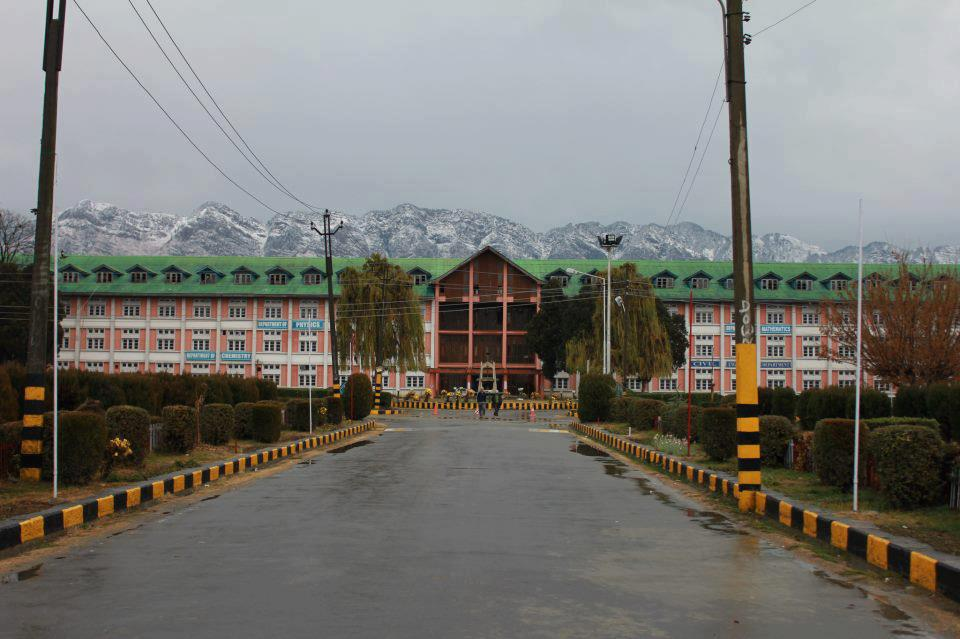
NIT Srinagar, main building of the Academic Block.

Jammu and Kashmir (J&K) Union Territory of India has 6 Institutes of National Importance, 11 universities (2 central and 9 state universities), 4 research institutes, 11 medical colleges, at least 14 engineering colleges, and many other prominent institutes in 2024. These are listed by the administrative division and districts of J&K, from north to south.

== Tertiary education ==
=== Institutes of National Importance ===
Listed by divisions and districts, north to south:

- Kashmir Division
  - Srinagar district
    - National Institute of Fashion Technology Srinagar (NIFT Srinagar).
    - National Institute of Technology Srinagar (NIT Srinagar)

  - Pulwama district
    - All India Institute of Medical Sciences, Awantipora (AIIMS Awantipora)

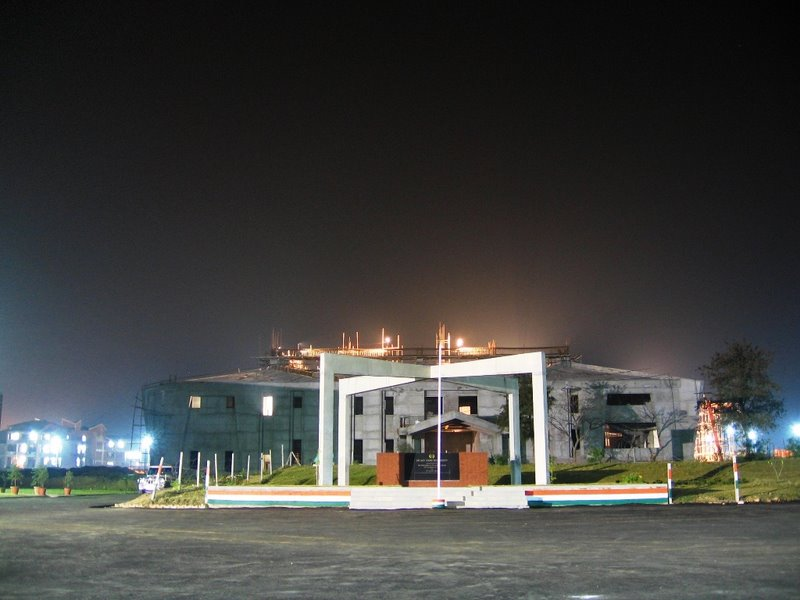
Shri Mata Vaishno Devi University (SMVDU), Matrika Auditorium, Katra

- Jammu Division
  - Jammu district
    - Indian Institute of Mass Communication, Bantalab, Jammu (IIMS Jammu)
    - Indian Institute of Technology Jammu (IIT Jammu)
    - Indian Institute of Management Jammu (IIM Jammu)
  - Samba district
    - All India Institute of Medical Sciences, Vijaypur (AIIMS Vijaypur / AIIMS Jammu)

=== Universities ===
There are two central universities and nine state universities in the Indian UT of Jammu and Kashmir.

Universities in Jammu and Kashmir
University	Administrative Division	Location	Type	Established	Specialization	Distance from Division HQ (km)	Sources
University of Kashmir	Kashmir division (north)	Srinagar	State	1948	General	0 (from Srinagar)	
University of Jammu	Jammu division (south)	Jammu	State	1969	General	0 (from Jammu)	
Sher-e-Kashmir University of Agricultural Sciences and Technology of Kashmir (SUASTK)	Kashmir division (north)	Srinagar	State	1982	Agriculture	0 (from Srinagar)	
Sher-e-Kashmir University of Agricultural Sciences and Technology of Jammu (SUASTJ)	Jammu division (south)	Jammu	State	1999	Agriculture	0 (from Jammu)	
Shri Mata Vaishno Devi University (SMVDU)	Jammu division (south)	Katra	State	1999	Engineering, Science & Technology, Management, Architecture, Humanities & Research	35 (from Jammu)	
Islamic University of Science and Technology (IUST)	Kashmir division (north)	Awantipora	State	2005	Science, technology	30 (from Srinagar)	
Baba Ghulam Shah Badshah University (BGSBU)	Jammu division (north)	Rajouri	State	2005	General	150 (from Jammu)	
Central University of Jammu (CU Jammu)	Jammu division (south)	Samba	Central	2009	General	25 (from Jammu)	
Central University of Kashmir (CU Kashmir)	Kashmir division (north)	Ganderbal	Central	2009	General	25 (from Srinagar)	
Cluster University of Jammu	Jammu division (south)	Jammu	State	2016	General	0 (from Jammu)	
Cluster University of Srinagar	Kashmir division (north)	Srinagar	State	2016	General	0 (from Srinagar)	

== Research Institutes ==
These are in addition to the institutes of national importance and universities which also conduct research. Listed by division, north to south:

- Kashmir Division
  - Central Institute of Temperate Horticulture (ICAR - Indian Council of Agricultural Research), Srinagar
  - Indian Institute of Integrative Medicine (IIIM), Srinagar
  - Jammu and Kashmir State Forest Research Institute (J&KSFRI),

Srinagar

  - Central Sericultural Research & Training Institute Pampore Pulwama Kashmir
- Jammu Division
  - Jammu Institute Of Ayurveda and Research (JIAR), Jammu
  - Regional Ayurveda Research Institute (RARI), Bantalab in Jammu.
  - Shri Mata Vaishno Devi University, Katra

== Professional education ==
=== Medical/Nursing Colleges ===
Listed north to south

- Kashmir Division
  - Medical & Nursing
    - Government Medical College, Handwara
    - Government Medical College, Baramulla
    - Government Medical College, Srinagar
    - Sher-i-Kashmir Institute of Medical Sciences, Srinagar
    - Government Medical College, Anantnag
- Jammu Division
  - Medical & Nursing
    - Government Medical College, Rajouri
    - Acharya Shri Chander College of Medical Sciences, Jammu
    - Government Medical College, Jammu
    - Government Medical College, Udhampur
    - Government Medical College, Doda
    - Government Medical College, Kathua
    - Shri Mata Vaishno Devi Institute of Medical Excellence, Katra
  - Nursing only
    - College of Nursing, Shri Mata Vaishno Devi University, Katra
    - IPHH College of Nursing and Allied Health Science, Jammu

=== Engineering Colleges ===
Listed by divisions and districts, north to south. Engineering colleges in Jammu and Kashmir number more than 10

- Kashmir Division
  - Baramulla district
    - SSM College of Engineering and Technology, Baramulla
  - Srinagar district
    - Institute of Technology, Zukura Campus, Srinagar.
    - National Institute of Technology, Srinagar
    - Government College of Engineering and Technology, Zukura in Srinagar
    - National Institute of Electronics & Information Technology (NIELIT), Srinagar
  - Pulwama district
    - College of Engineering and Technology, IUST Awantipora.
- Jammu Division
  - Rajouri district
    - School of Engineering, BGSB University, Rajouri
  - Reasi district
    - Shri Mata Vaishno Devi University, Katra
  - Jammu district
    - Yogananda College of Engineering and Technology, Muthi in Jammu
    - Mahant Bachittar Singh College of Engineering and Technology, Digaina in Jammu
    - Model Institute of Engineering and Technology, Jammu
    - Government College of Engineering and Technology, Jammu
  - Samba district
    - Bhargava College of Engineering and Technology, Samba
  - Kathua district
    - University Institute of Engineering and Technology, Kathua

== Other Prominent Colleges ==
Listed by divisions and districts, north to south:

- Kashmir Division
  - Baramulla district
    - Indian Institute of Skiing and Mountaineering, Gulmarg
  - Srinagar district
    - Aviation & Management Training Establishment (AMTE), Srinagar
    - Institute of Hotel Management, Srinagar
    - Islamia College of Science and Commerce, Srinagar
    - Iqbal Institute of Technology and Management, Srinagar
    - Kashmir Institute of Medical Sciences and Technology, Srinagar
  - Anantnag district
    - Anantnag city
      - Al Ahad College of Education, Anantnag
      - Government Women College, Anantnag
      - Government Polytechnic College, Anantnag
      - Institution of Technicians and Engineers, Anantnag
      - ITI Anantnag
      - Rehmat-e-Alam College Of Education, Anantnag
    - Pahalgam
      - Jawahar Institute of Mountaineering and Winter Sports, Pahalgam
- Jammu Division
  - Rajouri district
    - Government PG College, Rajouri
  - Jammu district
    - Food Craft Institute, Jammu
    - Govt. MAM PG College, Jammu
    - Govt. Gandhi Memorial Science College, Jammu
    - Indian Institute of Mass Communication Regional Centre, Jammu
    - Institute of Engineering Technology and Research, Jammu
    - Sri Pratap College, Jammu

== See also ==
- Jammu and Kashmir
  - List of engineering colleges in Jammu and Kashmir
  - Jammu and Kashmir State Board of School Education
  - List of institutes funded by the Central Government of India
- Kashmir Division
  - List of colleges affiliated to the University of Kashmir
  - Sainik School, Manasbal
- Jammu Division
  - List of colleges affiliated to the University of Jammu
