= Government Medical College =

Government Medical College may refer to one of several medical colleges in India:

== Jammu & Kashmir ==
- Government Medical College, Anantnag
- Government Medical College, Baramulla
- Government Medical College, Doda
- Government Medical College, Handwara
- Government Medical College, Jammu
- Government Medical College, Kathua
- Government Medical College, Rajouri
- Government Medical College, Srinagar
- Government Medical College, Udhampur

== Kerala ==
- Government Medical College, Ernakulam
- Government Medical College, Kannur
- Government Medical College, Kollam
- Government Medical College, Konni
- Government Medical College, Kottayam
- Government Medical College, Kozhikode
- Government Medical College, Manjeri
- Government Medical College, Palakkad
- Government Medical College, Thiruvananthapuram
- Government Medical College, Thrissur

== Maharashtra ==
- Government Medical College, Akola
- Government Medical College, Aurangabad
- Government Medical College, Baramati
- Government Medical College, Chandrapur
- Government Medical College, Gondia
- Government Medical College, Jalgaon
- Government Medical College, Latur
- Government Medical College, Miraj
- Government Medical College, Nagpur

== Telangana ==
- AIIMS, bibinagar
- Osmania Medical College, Hyderabad
- Government Medical College, Yadadri
- ESIC medical college, Hyderabad
- Kakatiya Medical College, Warangal
- Rajiv Gandhi Institute of Medical Sciences, Adilabad
- Gandhi Medical College, Secunderabad
- Government Medical College, Jangaon
- Government Medical College, Khamman
- Government medical College, Kumuram Bheem
- Government Medical College, Medak
- Government Medical College, Vikarabad
- Government Medical College, Bhadradri Kothagudem
- Government Medical College, Jagtial
- Government Medical College, Jayashankar Bhupalpally
- Government Medical College, Jogulamba Gadwal
- Government Medical College, Kamareddy
- Government Medical College, Karimnagar
- Government Medical College, Kodangal
- Government Medical College, Mahabubabad
- Government Medical College, Mahabubnagar
- Government Medical College, Maheshwaram
- Government Medical College, Mancherial
- Government Medical College, Mulugu
- Government Medical College, Nagarkurnool
- Government Medical College, Nalgonda
- Government Medical College, Narayanpet
- Government Medical College, Narsampet
- Government Medical College, Nirmal
- Government Medical College, Nizamabad
- Government Medical College, Quthbullapur
- Government Medical College, Rajanna Sircilla
- Government Medical College, Ramagundam
- Government Medical College, Sangareddy
- Government Medical College, Siddipet
- Government Medical College, Suryapet
- Government Medical College, Wanaparthy

== Rest of India ==
- Government Medical College, Amritsar
- Government Medical College, Anantapur
- Government Medical College, Azamgarh
- Government Medical College, Banda
- Government Medical College, Bhavnagar
- Government Medical College, Chandigarh
- Government Medical College, Haldwani
- Government Medical College, Jalaun
- Government Medical College, Kannauj
- Government Medical College, Kota
- Government Medical College, Pali
- Government Medical College, Patiala
- Government Medical College, Raigarh
- Government Medical College, Rajnandgaon
- Government Medical College, Srikakulam
- Government Medical College, Surat
