= Jammu division =

Administrative division in Jammu and Kashmir, India

- Region administered by India as an Administrative division
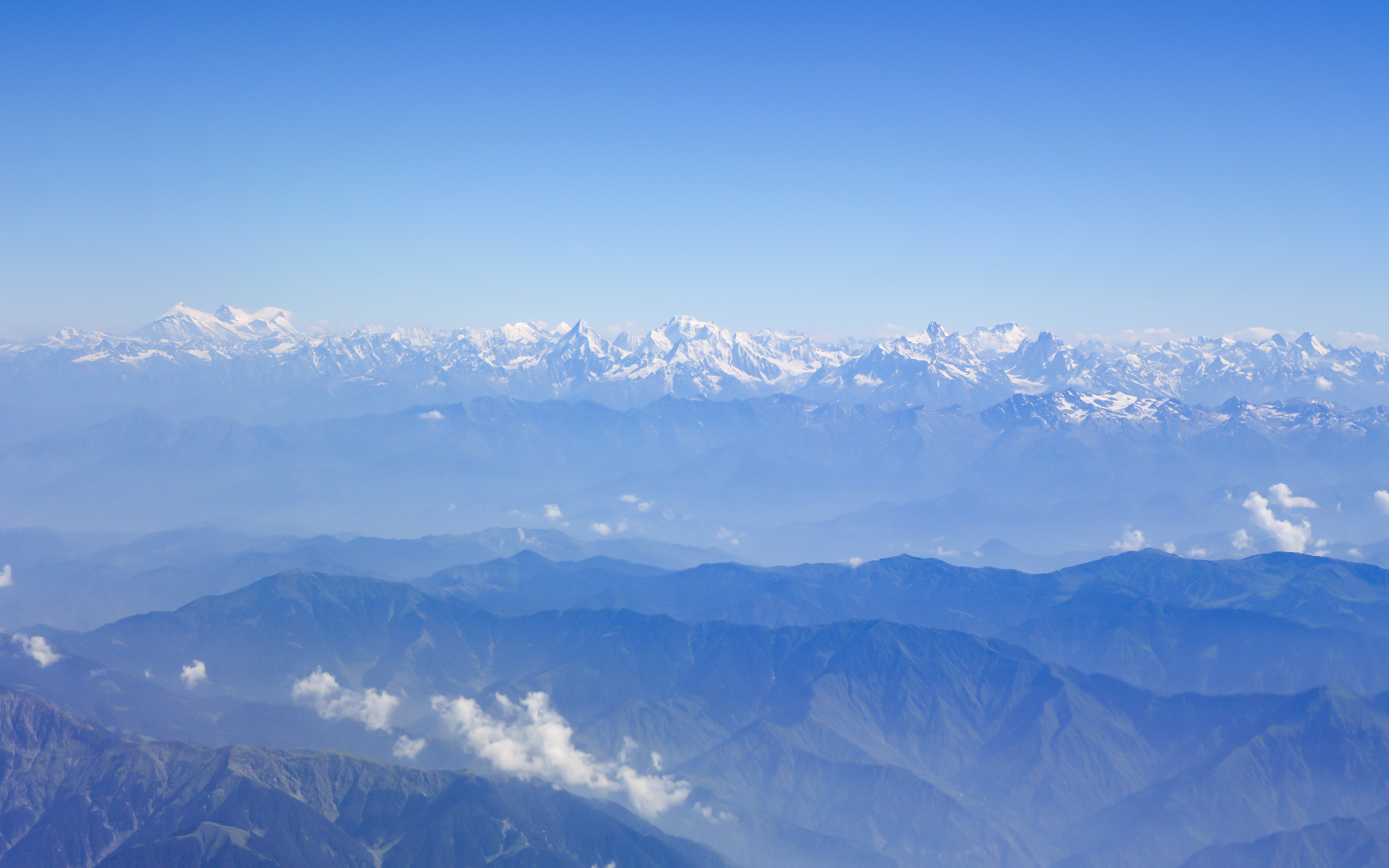
- Aerial view of the Himalayas of the Jammu Region, as seen from Jammu - Delhi flight
- Interactive map of Jammu division
- Coordinates: 32.73°N 74.87°E
- Administering country: India
- Union territory: Jammu and Kashmir
- Largest city: Jammu

Government
  - Type: Administrative Division

Area
  - Total: 26,293 km^{2} (10,152 sq mi)

Population
  - Total: 5,350,811
  - Density: 203.51/km^{2} (527.08/sq mi)

Languages
  - Official: Dogri, Kashmiri, Urdu, Hindi, English
  - Spoken: Dogri, Pahari, Gujari, Kashmiri, Bhadarwahi, Sarazi, Kishtwari, Padari, Hindi, Punjabi, Urdu
- Time zone: UTC+5:30 (IST)
- Website: divcomjammu.gov.in

The Jammu division (/ˈdʒæmuː, ˈdʒʌm-/; Dogri pronunciation: [dʒəmːuː]) is a revenue and administrative division of the Indian-administered Jammu and Kashmir in the disputed Kashmir region. It is bordered by the Kashmir division to the north. It consists of the districts of Jammu, Doda, Kathua, Ramban, Reasi, Kishtwar, Poonch, Rajouri, Udhampur and Samba. Most of the land is hilly or mountainous, traversed by the ranges of the Himalayas, with the Sivalik Hills in the west and south, the middle Himalayan Pir Panjal Range (which separates Jammu from the Kashmir Valley) in the middle, and the Great Himalayas in the east delineating the border with Ladakh. Its principal rivers are the Chenab, Tawi and Ravi.

Jammu city is the largest city in Jammu and the winter capital of Jammu and Kashmir. It is also known as "City of Temples" as it has many temples and shrines, with shikhars dotting the city's skyline.

Home to some of the most revered Hindu temples, such as Vaishno Devi, Jammu is a major pilgrimage centre for Hindus. A majority of Jammu's population practices Hinduism, while Islam and Sikhism enjoy a strong cultural heritage in the region.

== History ==
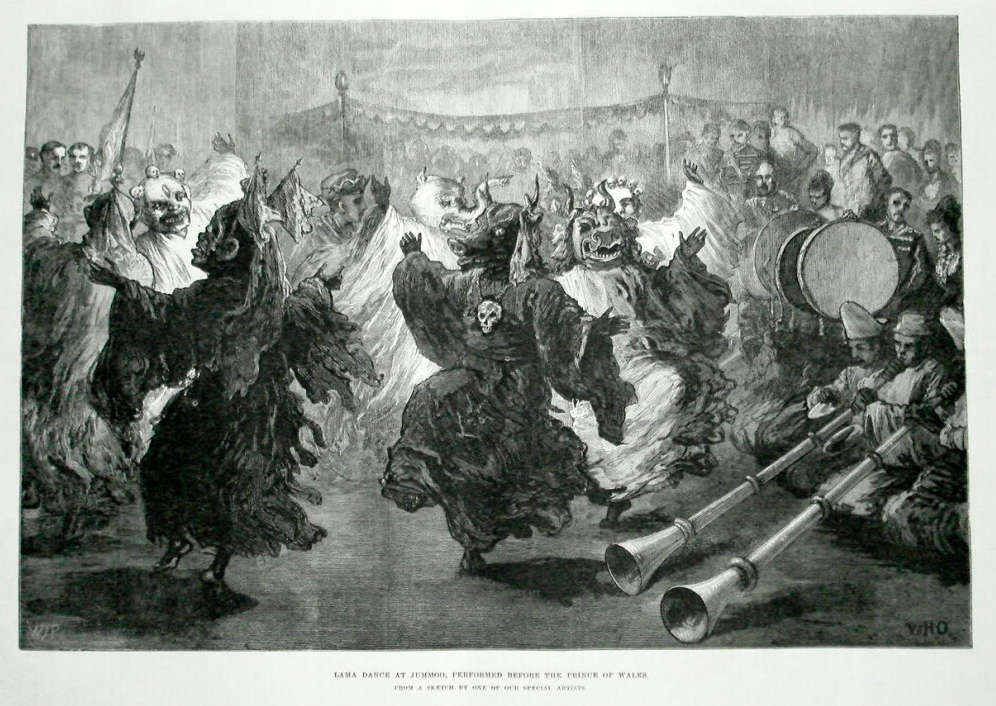
Lama dance at Jummoo

The hilly regions to the south and southwest of the Kashmir Valley formed the Jammu Province of the princely state of Jammu and Kashmir. During the declining years of the Mughal Empire, the region comprised 22 hill states that emerged from the Mughal suzerainty. Hutchison and Vogel, who first studied these states, called them the Dugar group of states. (Dugar is a medieval term with ancient form Durgara and modern form Dogra.) The state of Jammu is believed to have been the most prominent among the Dugar group, which they identified with the kingdom of Durgara.

The term Durgara is attested in an 11th-century copper plate inscription from Chamba. The inscription refers to an attack on Chamba by the "Lord of Durgara" allied with Saumatikas and the Kiras of Chamba. However, no kingdom by that name is mentioned in the Rajatarangini. Durgara could have been a reference to Vallapura (modern Billawar) or Babbapura (modern Babor). Some scholars believe it to have been a regional or ethnic name current in the region.

Jammu is mentioned by name in the chronicles of Timur, who invaded Delhi in 1398 and returned to Samarkand via Jammu. Raja Bhim Dev is prominently mentioned in the Delhi chronicles as a supporter of Mubarah Shah (r. 1421–1434) against Jasrat. Between 1423 and 1442, Jammu came under control of Jasrat (r. 1405–1442) who conquered it after killing his arch-enemy Bhim Dev in 1423. Later, Jasrat appointed Manik Dev (also known as Ajeo Dev) as vassal, and married his daughter. In the early-16th-century Mughal chronicles of Babur, Jammu is mentioned as a powerful state in the Punjab hills. Emperor Akbar brought the hill kingdoms of the region under Mughal suzerainty, but the kings enjoyed considerable political autonomy. In addition to Jammu, other kingdoms of the region such as Kishtwar and Rajauri were also prominently mentioned. It is evident that the Mughal empire treated these hill chiefs as allies and partners in the empire.

After the decline of Mughal power in the 18th century, the Jammu state under Raja Dhruv Dev, of the Jamuwal (or Jamwal) family, asserted its supremacy among the Dugar states. Its ascent reached its peak under his successor Raja Ranjit Dev (r. 1728–1780), who was widely respected among the hill states. Towards the end of Ranjit Dev's rule, the Sikh clans of Punjab (misls) gained ascendancy, and Jammu began to be contested by the Bhangi, Kanhaiya and Sukerchakia misls. Around 1770, the Bhangi misl attacked Jammu and forced Ranjit Dev to become a tributary. Brij Lal Dev, his successor, was defeated by the Sukerchakia chief Mahan Singh, who sacked Jammu and plundered it. Thus Jammu lost its supremacy over the surrounding country.

In 1808, Jammu itself was annexed to the Sikh Empire by Maharaja Ranjit Singh, the son of Mahan Singh.

=== Gulab Singh and the Dogra dynasty ===
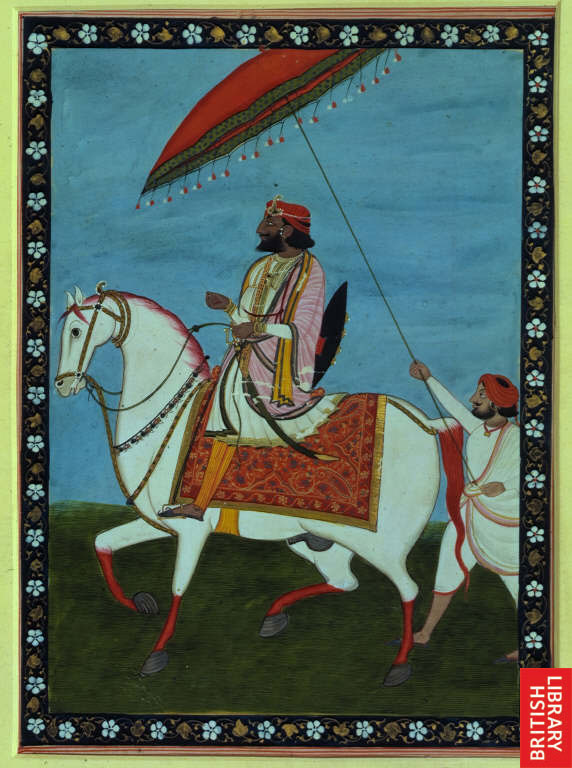
Maharaja Gulab Singh, the founder of princely state of Jammu and Kashmir

After the Sikh conquest of Jammu, Gulab Singh, a descendant of Dhruv Dev via his third son, went on to enrol in the Sikh troops. He soon distinguished himself in battles and was awarded a jagir near Jammu with an allowance to keep an independent force. After the conquest of Kishtwar (1821) and the subjugation of Rajouri, he was made a hereditary Raja of Jammu in 1822, personally anointed by Ranjit Singh. His brother Dhyan Singh received Poonch and Chibhal, and Suchet Singh Ramnagar.

By 1827, Gulab Singh brought under his control all the principalities lying between Kashmir and Jammu. Thus the entire Jammu province came under the control of the three Jamwal brothers under the umbrella of the Sikh Empire.

After the death of Maharaja Ranjit Singh in 1839, the Sikh court fell into anarchy and palace intrigues took over. Gulab Singh's brothers Dhyan Singh and Suchet Singh, as well as his nephew Hira Singh, were murdered in the struggles. The relations between the Sikh court and Gulab Singh deteriorated. During the First Anglo-Sikh War (1845–1846), Gulab Singh kept aloof. He was nevertheless invited to Lahore and installed as prime minister of the Sikh Empire. His actions as the Prime Minister were duplicitous and contributed to a Sikh defeat.

The British decided to weaken the power of the Sikhs and set up Gulab Singh as a counterweight. Accordingly, they demanded a war indemnity from the Sikhs which included all of the hilly territory between the Ravi and Indus rivers, and then transferred it to Gulab Singh, recognising him as an independent Maharaja. Gulab Singh paid 7.5 million Nanakshahee Rupees to the British in the transaction. Thus the princely state of Jammu and Kashmir came into being, ruled by Gulab Singh and his descendants, known as the Dogra dynasty.

During the Dogra rule, Jammu in the Jammu province and Srinagar in Kashmir province were both used as capitals, six months to a year each. Poonch and Chibhal were granted as jagirs to Dhyan Singh's surviving sons, Jawahir Singh and Moti Singh. However, Jawahir Singh got involved in conspiracies and was exiled to Punjab. Chibhal (Bhimber) thus reverted to Gulab Singh, while Poonch remained under the control of Moti Singh and his descendants under the suzerainty of Jammu and Kashmir.

=== Partition and accession ===
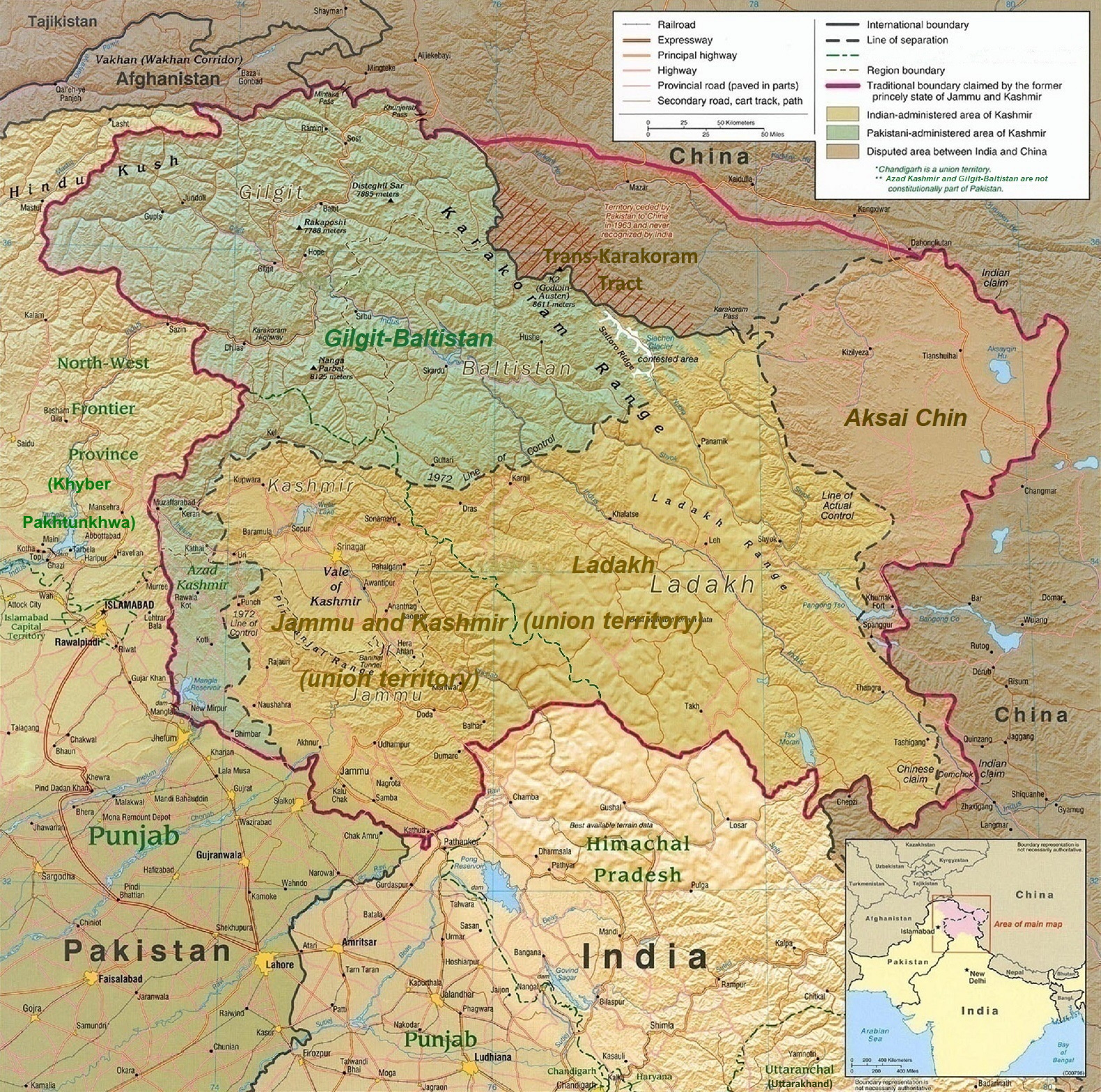
Kashmir region divided across Pakistan, India and China

During the partition of India, the ruler was Maharaja Hari Singh. He, along with all the other princes, was given the choice of acceding to either India or Pakistan, taking into consideration the geographical contiguity and the wishes of the population. The Maharaja chose not to accede to either dominion before the appointed date, citing the mixed religious composition of his state. This technical independence was short-lived as the Maharaja faced a rebellion in the western districts and a Pakistan-inspired Pashtun tribal invasion. Unable to withstand the assaults, the Maharaja acceded to India on 26–27 October 1947. India airlifted troops to Kashmir to repel the raiders. However, major portions of the western districts of Muzaffarabad, Poonch, and Mirpur remained under the control of Pakistan. The remainder of the state was incorporated into India via the Constitution of India, which also provided autonomy to the state under Article 370.

== Geography and climate ==
Jammu borders the Kashmir Valley to the north, Ladakh to the east, and Punjab and Himachal Pradesh to the south. In the west, the Line of Control separates Jammu from Pakistani-administered Kashmir (known as Azad Kashmir in Pakistan). In between Kashmir Valley to the north and the Daman Koh plains to the south, the Shivalik Range comprises most of the region of Jammu. The Pir Panjal Range, the Trikuta Hills and the low-lying Tawi River basin add diversity to the terrain of Jammu. The Pir Panjal range separates Jammu from the Kashmir Valley. Jammu region has eight geographical subregions Ravi-Tawi Kandi plains, Shiwaliks, Pir Panjal belt, Chenab Valley, Bhaderwah Valley, Gandoh Valley, Paddar Valley and Warwan-Marwah Valley.

The climate of the region varies with altitude. In and around Jammu city, the climate is similar to the nearby Punjab region: hot summers, rainy monsoon, and mildly cold and foggy winters. While Jammu city itself does not experience any snowfall, the higher hills and mountains are snow-capped in winter. People from all over India come to Patnitop mountain resort to enjoy the winter snows. The shrine of Vaishno Devi is covered with snow in the winter. The Banihal Pass, which links the Jammu region to the Kashmir region, often experiences closure in the winter months due to extremely heavy snowfall.

== Demographics ==
Religions in Jammu Division (2011)
1. Hinduism (67.5%)
2. Islam (30.0%)
3. Sikhism (2.00%)
4. Christianity (0.30%)
5. Others (0.20%)
6. Not Stated (0.10%)
Jammu Division: mother-tongue of population, according to the 2011 Census.
1. Dogri (46.6%)
2. Pahari (13.2%)
3. Gojri (13.1%)
4. Kashmiri (11.1%)
5. Others (5.45%)
6. Hindi (3.46%)
7. Punjabi (3.12%)
8. Bhadrawahi (1.83%)
9. Siraji (1.44%)
10. Urdu (0.18%)
11. 0.18%

According to the 2011 census, the total population of Jammu Division is 5,350,811. Scheduled castes (Dalits) constitute 19.44% of the population and Scheduled tribes comprise 15-20% of the population in Jammu Division. Five out of 10 districts, mainly in the hilly areas of the east and north, have Muslim majorities, while the densely populated plains of the southwest are predominantly Hindu. Gurjar-Bakarwals and Gaddi-Sippis, who practice transhumance, are also found here. The largest ethnic group in the Jammu Division are the Dogras, who comprise approximately 47% of the population. Jammu's people are closely related to Punjabis.

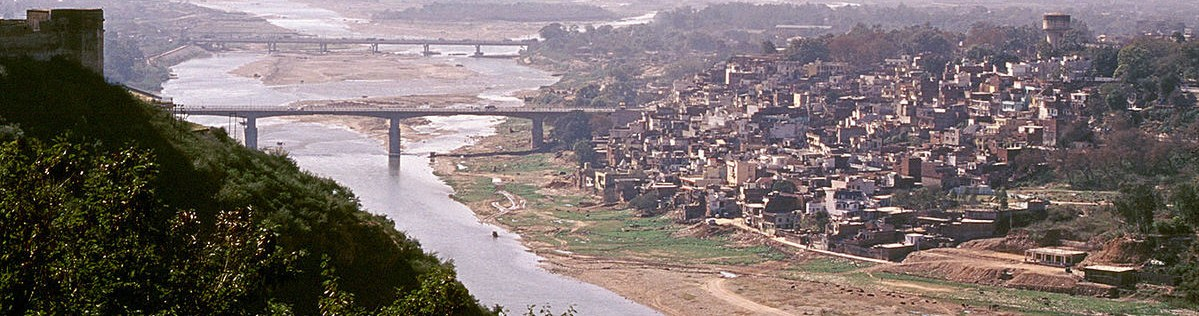
Tawi River

The Jammu District overall has a population – 84% practice Hinduism, 7% practice Islam and most of the remainder are Sikhs. The Hindus form a majority in the Jammu, Kathua, Samba and Udhampur districts, and roughly half the population in the Reasi district. Most of Jammu's Hindus are native Dogras, Kashmiri Pandits, Punjabi Hindu migrants and refugees from the Kotli and Mirpur areas which are currently administered by Pakistan. Many Sikhs are migrants from Pakistan-administered Kashmir, mainly from Muzaffarabad and Poonch sector areas annexed by Pakistan in 1947.

In Jammu Division, "Dogri is spoken by a majority in the five districts of Jammu, Udhampur, Kathua, Samba and Reasi". Other common languages include Gojri, Pahari, Kashmiri, Hindi, Punjabi and Urdu.

Jammu Division: mother-tongue of population, according to the 2011 Census.
Mother tongue code	Mother tongue	People	Percentage
001002	Assamese	2,930	0.05%
002007	Bengali	8,826	0.16%
004001	Dogri	2,505,677	46.59%
005018	Gujarati	2,581	0.05%
005054	Ponchi	13,651	0.25%
006086	Bhadrawahi	98,159	1.83%
006096	Bharmauri/Gaddi	24,019	0.45%
006102	Bhojpuri	6,455	0.12%
006125	Bundeli/Bundel khandi	1,303	0.02%
006142	Chhattisgarhi	9,287	0.17%
006173	Dhundhari	2,073	0.04%
006195	Garhwali	794	0.01%
006207	Gojri/Gujjari/Gujar	703,049	13.07%
006235	Haryanvi	10,230	0.19%
006240	Hindi	186,204	3.46%
006340	Kumauni	946	0.02%
006376	Magadhi/Magahi	1,133	0.02%
006438	Padari	17,225	0.32%
006439	Pahari	711,587	13.23%
006489	Rajasthani	2,119	0.04%
007016	Kannada	3,445	0.06%
008005	Kashmiri	595,290	11.07%
008010	Kishtwari	39,606	0.74%
008018	Siraji	77,355	1.44%
008019	Dardi	3,669	0.07%
010008	Maithili	578	0.01%
011016	Malayalam	5,994	0.11%
012003	Meitei	1,195	0.02%
013071	Marathi	11,007	0.20%
014011	Nepali	17,214	0.32%
015043	Odia	4,923	0.09%
016038	Punjabi	167,602	3.12%
020027	Tamil	6,984	0.13%
021046	Telugu	7,214	0.13%
022015	Urdu	9,702	0.18%
024001	Afghani/Kabuli/Pashto	559	0.01%
031011	Bauti	1,971	0.04%
040001	English	398	0.01%
053005	Gujari	22,063	0.41%
055007	Khasi	1,195	0.02%
073003	Ladakhi	596	0.01%
109005	Shina	613	0.01%
–	Others	91,117	1.69%
Total		5,378,538	100.00%

Hindus of Jammu region are subdivided into various caste groups, and of them Brahmins and Rajputs are the predominant ones. According to the 1941 census, 30% of them were Brahmin, 27% Rajput, 15% Thakkar [or Rajput and Thakkar combined 42%], 2% Jat, 10% Khatri and 8% Megh and Chamar are the most common. Other Backward Classes comprises 32% of population in Jammu.

The districts of Rajouri, Poonch, Doda, Kishtwar and Ramban have a Muslim-majority population. The Reasi district has an almost equal number of Muslims (49.7%) and Hindus (48.9%). The Muslim ethnic groups are, Gujjar Bakerwal and paharis in Poonch and Rajouri districts who are ethno-linguistically different from the Kashmiri Muslims. There is a substantial presence of Kashmiri Muslims in Kishtwar, Ramban and Doda districts. Reasi district also has a significant population of Kashmiri Muslims. The Jammu district also has a significant population of Kashmiri Hindus.

== Districts ==
Districts (in red letters) & Sub-districts (in back letters) of Jammu division in 2013

As of April 2021, the Jammu Division consists of ten districts:

Name of district	Headquarters	Area				Population (2001)	Population (2011)	Religious Composition (2011)	
Name of district	Headquarters	Total (km^{2})	Total (sq mile)	Rural (km^{2})	Urban (km^{2})	Population (2001)	Population (2011)	Hindu %	Muslim %
Kathua	Kathua	2,502	966	2,458.84	43.16	550,084	615,711	87.6%	10.4%
Jammu	Jammu	2,342	904	2,089.87	252.13	1,343,756	1,526,406	84.3%	7.5%
Samba	Samba	904	349	865.24	38.76	245,016	318,611	86.3%	7.2%
Udhampur	Udhampur	2,637	1,018	2,593.28	43.72	475,068	555,357	88.1%	10.8%
Reasi	Reasi	1,719	664	1,679.99	39.01	268,441	314,714	48.9%	49.7%
Rajouri	Rajouri	2,630	1,015	2,608.11	21.89	483,284	619,266	34.5%	62.7%
Poonch	Poonch	1,674	646	1,649.92	24.08	372,613	476,820	6.8%	90.5%
Doda	Doda	2,625	1,014	2,617.00	8.00	320,256	409,576	45.8%	53.8%
Ramban	Ramban	1,329	513	1,313.92	15.08	180,830	283,313	28.6%	70.7%
Kishtwar	Kishtwar	7,737	2,987	7,732.00	15.00	190,843	231,037	40.7%	57.8%

During the Maharaja's reign before the Independence and Partition of India (and of Jammu and Kashmir), the following districts were also part of Jammu region: Bhimber, Kotli, Mirpur, Poonch (Western parts), Haveli, Bagh and Sudhnati. Today these districts are part of Pakistan Administered Jammu and Kashmir.

== Politics ==
The major political parties in the region are the Congress, the BJP, the National Conference, the Jammu and Kashmir People's Democratic Party and the Jammu and Kashmir National Panthers Party.

Various sections of the society in the region including the BJP have been advocating the separation of Jammu region from Kashmir and its inclusion as a distinct entity into the Indian Union, citing largely Kashmir-centric policies in the existing state and neglect of the Jammu region by successive Kashmir dominated administrations.

In November 2020, the organisation IkkJutt Jammu was launched as a party and demanded Jammu division be separated and given statehood. The then social organisation IkkJutt Jammu campaigned against the Roshni Act, which was declared unconstitutional by the Jammu and Kashmir High Court in 2020.

The present arrangement of legislative assembly seats (46 in Kashmir and 37 in Jammu) deprives Jammu region an equal say in decision-making process. This has been the main point of contention behind the strong regional divide. There have been repeated demands for the constitution of a Delimitation Commission to address issues related to electoral arrangements. After changing the status of the state to Union territory, the Government announced setting up of Delimitation Commission with retired Supreme Court judge Ranjana Prakash Desai as its chairman.

== Economy ==
Jammu Chamber of Commerce & Industry is an apex body of traders, industrialists and those associated with commercial activities in the Jammu division.

== Places of interest ==
Jammu is known for its landscape, ancient temples, Hindu shrines, Mubarak Mandi Palace, Amar Mahal Palace (now a Museum), gardens and forts. Hindu holy shrine Vaishno Devi attracts tens of thousands of Hindu devotees every year. Jammu's natural landscape has made it one of the most favoured destinations for adventure tourism in South Asia. Jammu's historic monuments feature a unique blend of Islamic and Hindu architecture styles.

=== Purmandal ===
Purmandal , also known as Chhota Kashi or Kashi of Jammu, is located 35 km from Jammu city. An ancient holy place, it has several temples of Shiva and other deities. On Shivratri, the town wears a festive look and for three days as people celebrate the marriage of Lord Shiva to Goddess Parvati.

=== Vaishno Devi shrine ===
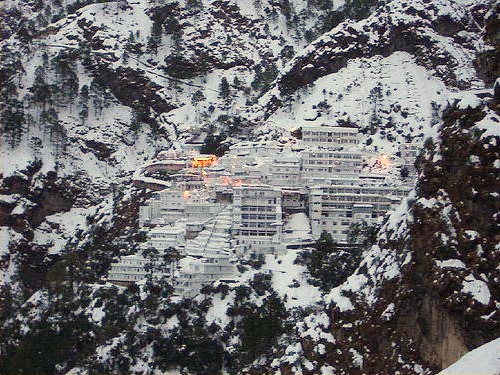
The Vaishno Devi shrine attracts millions of Hindu devotees every year

The town of Katra, which is 48 km (30 mi) from Jammu, contains the Vaishno Devi shrine. Nestling on top of the Trikuta Hills at a height of 1,700 metres (5,600 ft) is the sacred cave shrine of Vaishno Devi, the mother goddess. The cave is 30 metres (98 ft) long and just 1.5 metres (4 ft 11 in) high. At the end of the cave are shrines dedicated to the three forms of the mother goddess — Mahakali, Mahalakshmi and Mahasarasvati. Pilgrims start trekking to the cave temple, which is 13 km (8.1 mi) from Katra, enter in small groups through a narrow opening and walk through ice-cold waters to reach the shrines. According to legend, the mother goddess hid in the cave while escaping a demon whom she ultimately killed.

=== Nandini Wildlife Sanctuary ===
Nandini Wildlife Sanctuary is in an area of thick forests teeming with wildlife. It is a renowned natural habitat for a significant population of pheasants. Among the other avifauna are Indian mynah, blue rock pigeon, Indian peafowl, red junglefowl, cheer pheasant and chakor.

Spread over an area of 34 km^{2} (13 sq mi), the sanctuary is rich in fauna and provides refuge to a wide variety of mammals, chiefly leopard, wild boar, rhesus monkey, bharal and grey langur.

=== Sukrala Mata Mandir ===
This is an important Mandir of Jammu region dedicated to Goddess Sukrala, a manifestation of Goddess Sharada of Kashmir. It is located in Sukrala village near Billawar town in Kathua district.

=== Mansar Lake ===
Situated 62 km from Jammu, Mansar Lake is a lake fringed by forest-covered hills, over a mile long by half a mile wide. 32°41′46″N 75°08′49″E Besides being an excursion destination in Jammu, it is also a holy site, sharing the legend and sanctity of Lake Manasarovar.

On the eastern bank of Mansar Lake is a shrine dedicated to Shesha, a mythological snake with six heads. The shrine comprises a big boulder on which are placed a number of iron chains perhaps representing the small serpents waiting on the tutelary deity of Shesha. Newlyweds consider it auspicious to perform three circumambulations (Parikarma) around the lake to seek the blessings of Shesha.

Two ancient temples of Umapati Mahadev and Narasimha and a temple of Durga are situated in the vicinity of the Mansar Lake and which are visited by devotees in large numbers. People take a holy dip in the water of the lake on festive occasions. Certain communities of Hindus perform the Mundan ceremony (first haircut) of their male children here.

Mansar Lake also has boating facilities provided by the Tourism Department.

With all the religious belief and heritage behind the Mansar Lake, it is also famous among tourists with all its flora and fauna. The lake is circled by an illuminated, with viewing decks to observe seasonal birds, tortoise, and fishes of different species. A wildlife sanctuary houses jungle life, including spotted deer, neelgai, and water birds such as cranes and ducks. One can also witness the traditional and typical distinct lifestyle of Gujjar and Backarwals wearing ethnic costumes, living in open Kullhas in the hills around Mansar Lake.

The Mansar Lake road joins to another important road that directly links Pathankot to Udhampur. Udhampur is a town of strategic importance, on National Highway No. 1A. The shortcut road from Mansar or Samba to Udhampur by-pass the Jammu town. Surinsar Lake, a smaller lake that is linked to Mansar, is 24 km (15 mi) from Jammu via the by-pass road.

=== Bahu Fort ===
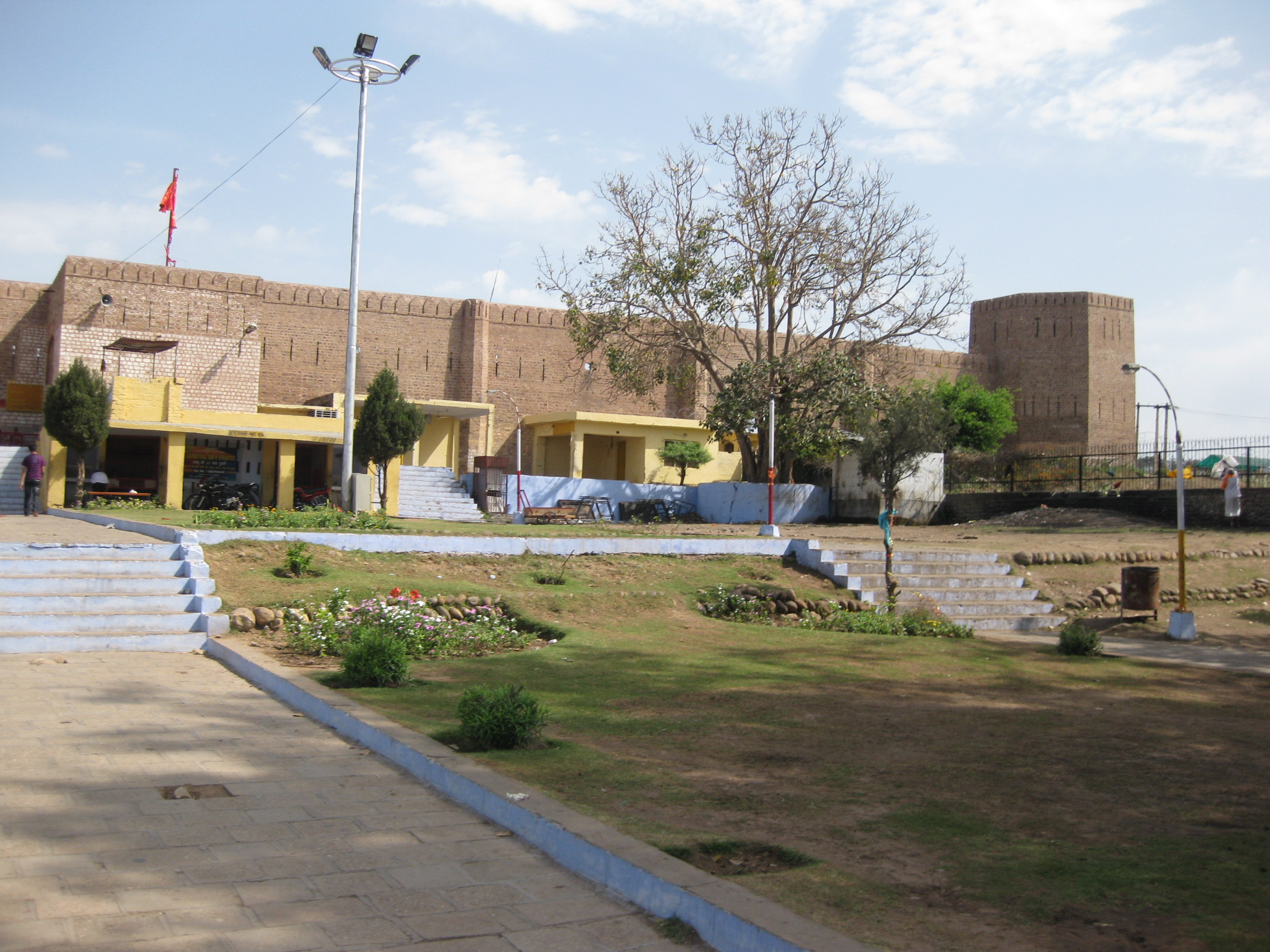
Bahu Fort

Bahu Fort, which also serves as a religious temple, is situated about 5 km from Jammu city on a rock face on the left bank of the river Tawi. This is perhaps the oldest fort and edifice in Jammu city. Constructed originally by Raja Bahulochan over 3000 years ago, the fort was improved and rebuilt by Dogra rulers. Inside the fort is a temple dedicated to the Goddess Kali, popularly known as Bave Wali Mata, the presiding deity of Jammu. Every Tuesday and Sunday pilgrims throng this temple and partake in "Tawi flowing worship". Today the fort is surrounded by a terraced garden which is a favourite picnic spot of the city folk.

Bagh-e-Bahu, located on the banks of Tawi river, is a Mughal-age garden. It gives a nice view of the old city and Tawi river. There is a small canteen on one side of the garden.

On the by-pass road behind Bahu Fort, the city forest surrounds the ancient Mahamaya Temple overlooking the river Tawi. A small garden surrounded by acres of woods provides a commanding view of the city.

Opposite the Bahu Fort, overlooking the River Tawi is a temple dedicated to Mahamaya of Dogra descent, who lost her life fourteen centuries ago fighting foreign invaders. The present temple of Bawey Wali Mata was built shortly after the coronation of Maharaja Gulab Singh, in 1822. It is also known as the temple of Mahakali and the goddess is considered second only to Mata Vaishno Devi in terms of mystical power.

=== Raghunath Temple ===
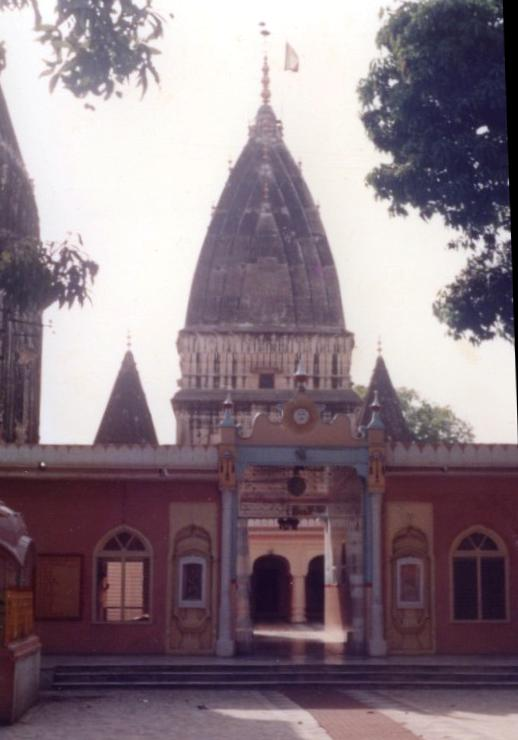
Raghunath Temple

Amongst the temples in Jammu, the Raghunath Temple takes pride of place being situated right in the heart of the city. This temple is situated at the city center and was built in 1857. Work on the temple was started by Maharaja Gulab Singh, founder of the State of Jammu and Kashmir, in 1835 CE and was completed by his son Maharaja Ranbir Singh in 1860 CE. The inner walls of the main temple are covered with gold sheet on three sides. There are many galleries with hundreds of thousands of shaligrams. The surrounding Temples are dedicated to various Gods and Goddesses connected with the epic Ramayana. This temple consists of seven shrines, each with a tower of its own. It is the largest temple complex in northern India. Though 130 years old, the complex is remarkable for sacred scriptures, one of the richest collections of ancient texts and manuscripts in its library. Its arches, surface, and niches are undoubtedly influenced by Mughal architecture while the interiors of the temple are plated with gold. The main sanctuary is dedicated to Lord Vishnu's eighth incarnation and Dogras' patron deity, Rama. It also houses a Sanskrit Library containing rare Sanskrit manuscripts.

=== Peer Kho Cave ===
Alongside the same Tawi river are the Peer Kho Cave temple, the Panchbakhtar temple and the Ranbireshwar temple dedicated to Lord Shiva with their own legends and specific days of worship. Peer Kho cave is located on the bank of river Tawi and it is widely believed that Ramayan character Jamvant (the bear god) meditated in this cave. The Ranbireshwar Temple has twelve Shiva lingams of crystal measuring 300 mm (12 in) to 460 mm (18 in) and galleries with thousands of shaligrams fixed on stone slabs. Located on the Shalimar Road near the New Secretariat, and built by Maharaja Ranbir Singh in 1883 CE. It has one central lingam measuring 2.3 metres (7 ft 7 in) in height and twelve Shiva lingams of crystal measuring from 150 to 380 mm (5.9 to 15.0 in) and galleries with thousands of Shiva lingams fixed on stone slabs.

=== Shivkhori ===
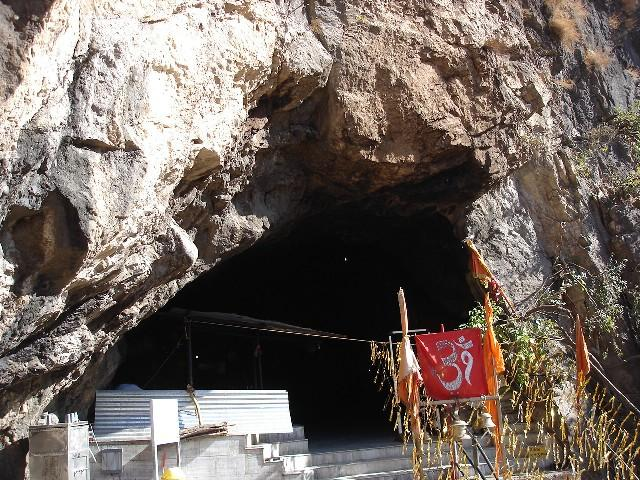
The Shivkhori cave

The cave shrine of Shivkhori, situated in Reasi District of Jammu and Kashmir, depicts the natural formation of shivlingum. It is one of the most venerated cave shrines of Lord Shiva in the region. The holy cave is approximately 150 m (490 ft) long, and contains "4 ft (1.2 m) high Svayambhu Lingum, which constantly baths in a milky lime fluid dripping from the ceiling." The first entrance of the cave is so wide that 300 devotees can be accommodated at a time. Its cavern is spacious enough to accommodate a large number of people. The inner chamber of the cave is smaller. The cave has many natural impressions and images of various Hindu deities and full of divine feelings. That is why Shivkhori is known as "the Home of Gods".

A 3-day Shiv Khori mela takes places annually on Maha Shivratri and thousands of pilgrims from different parts of the state and elsewhere visit this cave shrine to seek the blessings of Lord Shiva. The Maha Shivratri festival is usually held in February or during the first week of March every year. Keeping in view the increasing rush of pilgrims to the holy cave shrine, the Shiv Khori Shrine Board has taken up a number of steps to develop this spot in a bid to provide more and more facilities to the devotees, like the construction of a Shrine Guest House at a cost of Rs. 19 lakh at village Ransoo, the base camp of yatra, a reception centre and pony shed at an estimated cost of ₹7.959 million (US$83,000), tile work of entire a 3-kilometre-long (1.9 mi) track is nearing completion, plantation of ornamental and medicinal plants on track and development of parks etc. Other arrangements like electrification of the cave with modern techniques, provision of oxygen and electric generators, exhaust fans, construction of shelter sheds for travellers with toilet facilities near the cave site, 15 shelter sheds en route Ransoo to cave shrine, railing from the base camp to cave, additional facility of 15,000/EfnrKing water reservoir, proper sanitation, provision of 25 kV capacity electric transformer, clock room, starting of permanent bus services from Katra, Udhampur, and Jammu, police post and dispensary and an STD PCO are under active consideration of the Shiv Khori Shrine Development Board.

Recently, the management and development of the Shiv Khori have been taken over by Sri Mata Vaishno Devi Shrine Board who is looking after Vaishno Devi pilgrimage.

=== Machail Mata ===
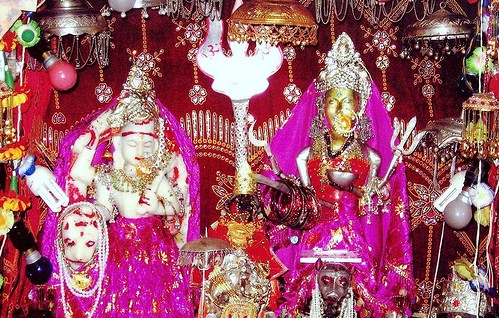
Machail Mata

Machail Mata The Chandi Maa temple is located in the village Machel, District Kishtwar, Jammu Region. The place is about 290 km (180 mi) from Jammu. During 'Chhadi Yatra', thousands of people visit the shrine. The pilgrimage happens in the month of August only every year. The shrine was visited in 1981 by Thakur Kulveer Singh of Bhaderwah, Jammu region. From 1987 onwards, Thakur Kulveer Singh started 'Chhadi Yatra'that happens every year and thousands of people visit the shrine every year during 'Chhadi Yatra'. To reach the shrine, a lot of travel agents arrange buses from Jammu, Udhampur, Ramnagar, Bhaderwah. One can also hire a cab as well. It takes approximately 10 hours by road from Jammu to Gulabgarh. The Gulabgarh is the base camp. From Gulabgarh, the foot journey starts, that is 32 km. Usually, people take 2 days to reach the shrine by foot. On the way, there are many villages, where one can stay the night but the chaddi takes three days to reach Machel. Many people organise roadside 'langers' (free food points) on the way to the Gulabgarh. The government of Jammu and Kashmir also arranges basic amenities for the pilgrims.

Another means of reaching the shrine is by helicopter from Jammu and Gulabgarh. The helipad is only 100 m (330 ft) from the shrine.

=== City centres and attractions ===
One of the major attractions of Jammu is a revolving restaurant named Falak, located on the top of the hotel KC Residency. Ragunath Bazar is the main tourist and shopping districts of the city. The locality of Gandhi Nagar hosts the market areas of Gole Market, on Apsara Road. On any pleasant evening, one can take a stroll in Green Belt Park alongside the magnificent bungalows that adorn Green Belt Road. Rajinder Park on Canal Road is a new development. This park is situated between two canals and features a large fountain which is lit up at night. A children's area is located next to the park.

The city has "Big Bazaar" at Jewel Chowk as one of the shopping centres. A shopping mall named as 'Wave - The Wave Mall' is popular. There is one more shopping mall named as Palm Island near Canal Road. Also, a complex and a new age commercial hub by the name of Bahu-Plaza in Trikuta Nagar area is a common hangout spot for youngsters and young professionals. Most of the corporate sector and most of the mobile phone companies like Airtel, BSNL, Vodafone, Aircel and Tata Indicom are based in the Bahu Plaza complex. There are many cinema halls, the best out of those are KC Cineplex, Wave Cinema, Palm Cinema, etc. A PVR is also there near KC Cineplex.

=== Cuisine ===
Jammu is known for its chocolate barfi, sund panjeeri, patisa and its exotic local food. Rajma with rice is one of the specialty dishes of Jammu. Another is kalaadi, which is a processed cheese made by adding calf rennet in the buffalo milk. Fiddlehead Fern also known as kasrod is a GI Tagged item from he division and is highly prized for its taste and medicinal values and is often consumed as vegetable or pickle. Kohlrabi knows as kaddam in jammu is also a speciality product and its stew is eaten with rice.

=== Kalari ===
Kalari cheese is specialty made in the Ramnagar region of Jammu is famous all over the state.

Dogri food specialties include ambal, khatta meat, kulthein di dal, dal patt, maa da madra, rajma, and auriya. Pickles typical of Jammu are made of kasrod, girgle, mango with saunf, zimikand, tyaoo, seyoo, and potatoes. Auriya is a dish made with potatoes. During weddings it is typical to make kayoor and sund.

== Festivals of Jammu ==
=== Lohri ===
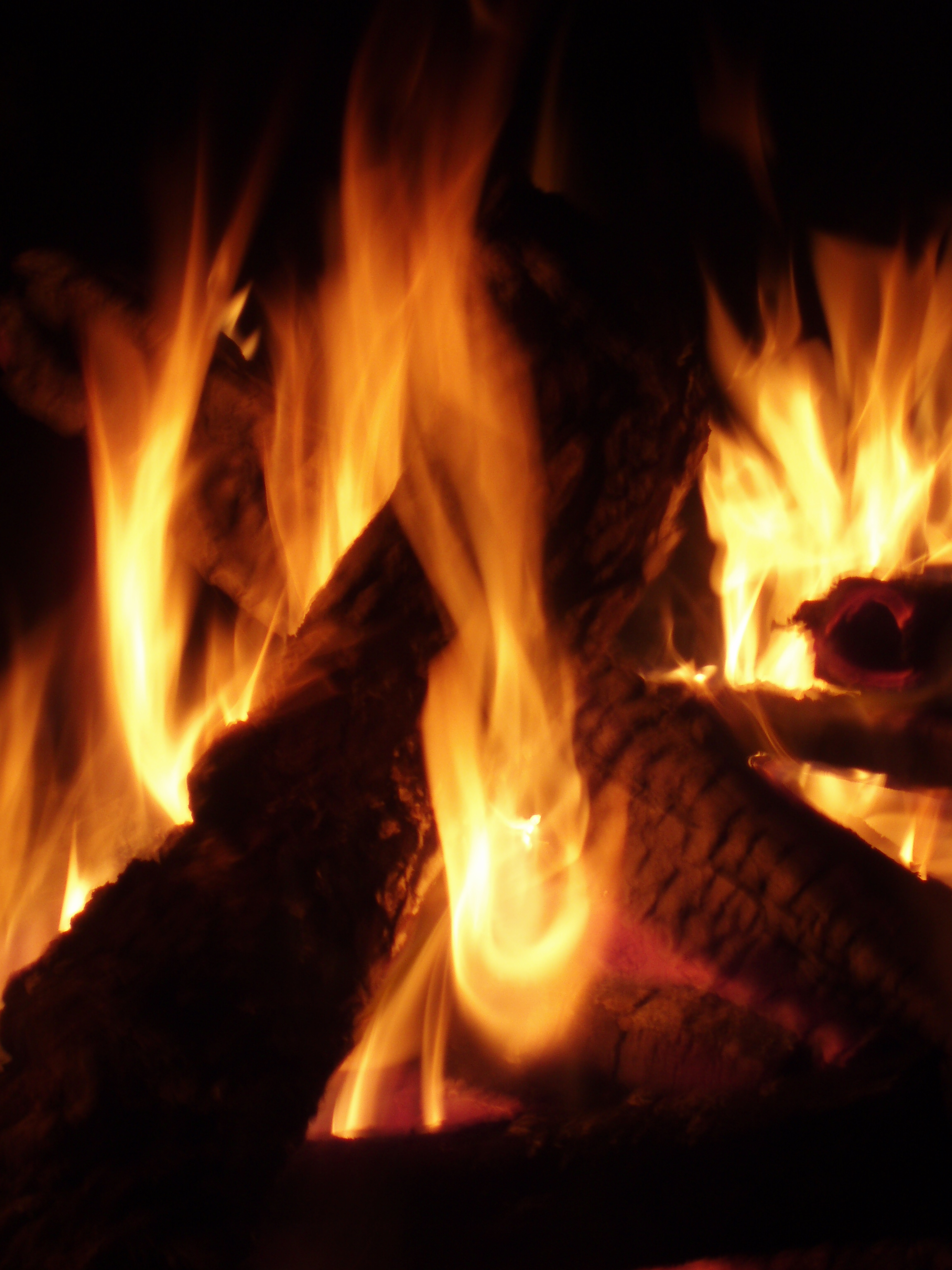
Lohri bonfire

This festival heralds the culmination of cold weather and is celebrated a day before Makar Sankranti. In rural areas, it is customary for young boys to go around asking for gifts from newlyweds and parents of newborns.

Lohri in Dogra households of Jammu is special because of various additional traditions associated with it like Chajja making, Hiran Dance, Dandaraas and preparing Lohri garlands.

Young children prepare a replica of peacock which is known as Chajja. They carry this Chajja and then go from one house to other house celebrating Lohri. A special dance is performed using this Chajja on the occasion of Lohri. It makes a striking picture to see boys along with their Chajjas elaborately decorated with coloured paper and flowers dance on the street in a procession. The whole atmosphere of Jammu comes alive with pulsating drumbeats. Besides, dancing boys strike sticks on rhythm of a drum as in Raslila. This is known as Dandaraas.

In and around Jammu, special Hiran Dance is performed. Dancers disguise themselves as deer and dance on tune of Hirana songs. They visit selected houses which have auspicious ceremonies & have prepared eatables. Children wear special garlands made of groundnuts, dry fruits and candies on Lohri day. Special eatable is prepared using sesame, rice and groundnuts which is known as Tilcholi. Pageant of Sassi-Punnu, two lovers of Sindhi folk tradition are also taken out on camels during the festival.

The next day, the whole region wears a festive look on Makar Sankranti. Thousands take a dip in the holy river Havan Yajnas are performed in nearly every house and temple in Jammu.

=== Uttarain or Maghi Sangrand (Makar Sankranti) ===
In Jammu, Makar Sankranti is celebrated as Uttarain (derived from Sanskrit: Uttarayana). Alternatively, terms Attrain or Attrani have also been used to describe this festival. A day before Lohri is celebrated by Dogras to commemorate end of Poh (Pausha) month. It is also beginning the Magha month as per Hindu Solar Calendar, hence also known as Maghi Sangrand (Sankranti of Magh month).

Among Dogras, there is a tradition of Mansana (charity) of Khichdi of Maah Dal. Khichdi of Maah di Dal is also prepared on this day and that is why this day is also referred to as 'Khichdi wala Parva'. There is also a tradition of sending Khichdi & other food items to house of married daughters. Fairs are organised on holy places and pilgrimages on this day. Dhagwal in Hiranagar tehsil is known for Fair on Makar Sankranti and Janamashtami.

People of Jammu also take holy bath in Devika river and pilgrimages like Uttar Behni and Purmandal on this occasion. This day is also celebrated as birth anniversary of Baba Ambo ji, a local deity of Jammu region.

At Vasuki temple of Bhaderwah of Jammu, the idols of Vasuki Nag are covered on Magh Sankranti and they are uncovered only after three months on Vaisakha Sankranti.

=== Bhugga (Sankashti Chaturthi) ===
This festival is celebrated on fourth day of Krishna Paksha of Magha month of Hindu Calendar. It is celebrated in reverence to Hindu God Ganesha and is also known as Sankashti Chaturthi. Dogra women perform Arghya to Chandrama at night. Bhugga (Til Jaggery mixture) and Radish are donated and eaten to complete the fast.

=== Basant Panchami ===
Basant Panchami festival is dedicated for worship of Goddess Saraswati, the goddess of learning, arts and music and for welcoming Spring Season. People wear yellow or saffron or orange colored clothes on this day. Saffron colored food items are prepared and offered as Naivedhya to Goddess Saraswati. People sing folk songs like Aayi Basant, Paala Udant. This day is also special for Dogras because on Basant Panchami of year 1944, Dogri Sanstha came into existence.

=== Kan Chauth (Gauri Chaturthi) ===
It is observed on fourth day of Shukla Paksha of Magha month of Hindu Calendar in the hill districts & tehsils of Jammu Division especially Bhaderwah, Doda, Kishtwar and Ramban. A day before Gauri Tritiya is also observed by some communities. This festival is observed by married woman similar to Karwa Chauth, only difference being fast is completed here after Gauri Puja in the day. Goddess Gauri is worshipped for long life and health of husbands by women. The festivity remains for three days. During these three days, ladies go in the neighborhood to offer ‘Thel’ (respect) to other women and get in return their blessing ‘Suhagan Bho’ (Live long your husband).

=== Holi ===
Holi is celebrated in traditional way in Jammu. On the eve of Holi, Holika Dahan is performed. The next day people enjoy by playing with colors. Earlier people used to decorate themselves using special headgears which were prepared using colored papers and silver ribbons. These were known as Patangi. A Dogra sweet dish Khaste (similar to Gujjiya) is prepared on this day. A three-day fair is organised at Narsingh Dev temple in Kathua.

=== Ram Naumi (Rama Navami) ===
Rama Navami, the birth of Shri Rama is celebrated with religious fervour & gaiety all across Jammu. The day also coincides with culmination of nine-day long Navaratra festival. Special function on Rama Navami is held in the historical Raghunath Temple in Jammu city where large number of devotees pay their obeisance to Lord Rama. Even during Dogra rule, the rulers would personally visit Raghunath Mandir and offer worship to Shri Rama, their patron deity. Besides, worship and offerings to the deity inside the temple, there are a number of discourses on Bhagwan Ram's life and Ramayana.

On this auspicious occasion, Shobha Yatra is taken out. Images of Shri Rama, Mata Sita & Lakshman and number of tableaux depicting scenes from Ramayana are taken out in a grogeous procession. Devotees shower flower petals on the Shobha Yatra. Number of market unions and Hindu organisations, organise Bhandaras on this occasion.

=== Basoa (Vishuva) or Baisakhi (Mesha Sankranti) ===
The name Baisakhi is taken from the first month of the Hindu Vikram calendar. It is celebrated on the first day of Vaisakh month and marks the day of Mesha Sankranti. It is also known as 'Basoa' in Dogri.

On this day, devotees get up early in the morning, throng the rivers, canals, and ponds and take a ritual dip every year on this occasion. In Dogra households, a Puja is performed afterwards and part of food crop is offered to the deities. New fruit of the year is enjoyed on this day. A Ritual Bath at Tawi river during Baisakhi is common in Jammu.

Baisakhi is celebrated at Udhampur on the bank of Devika river where for three days devotees enjoy the folk songs. At Sudhmahadev, this festival is celebrated with great pomp and show where folk singers come down and a competition of folk songs is held. Vendors generally install their shops and stalls of eatables.

Many people go to the Nagbani temple to witness the grand New Year celebration. Baisakhi is also considered "harvest festival" and considered auspicious, especially for marriages. Celebrations of Baisakhi also include Dogri Bhangra which is closely related to Punjabi variant, with respect to actions, costumes and songs.

The occasion is marked by numerous fairs and people come by the thousands to celebrate Baisakhi. For example, Airwan in Kathua is known for Baisakhi fair attended by 10,000 people as per Census 1961. Every year on Baisakhi festival around 15,000 pilgrims pay their obeisance at 700 tear old temple of Subar Nag Devta temple in Bhaderwah. Other places where Baisakhi fairs are held are Doda Bridge and Ramban.

=== Bahu Mela (March–April and September–October) ===
A major festival is held at the Kali Temple in Bahu Fort twice a year.

=== Chaitre Chaudash (March–April) ===
Chaitre Chaudash is celebrated at Uttar Behni and Purmandal, about 25 km (16 mi) and 28 km (17 mi) from Jammu respectively. Uttar Behni gets its name from the fact that the Devak River (locally also known as Gupt Ganga) flows here in the northerly direction.

=== Purmandal Mela (February–March) ===
Purmandal is 39 km (24 mi) from Jammu city. On Shivratri the town wears a festive look for three days as people celebrate the marriage of Lord Shiva to the Goddess Parvati. The people of Jammu also come out in their colourful best to celebrate Shivratri at Peer Khoh Cave Temple, the Ranbireshwar Temple, and the Panjbhaktar Temple. In fact, if one visits Jammu during Shivratri, one finds a celebration going on almost everywhere.

=== Dhamdeh (Dharma Dhihada - Aashada Sankranti) & Nirjala Ekadashi ===
Both of these festivals are celebrated similarly. Dhamdeh also known as Dharma Dhihada or Dharma Divas is celebrated on Sankranti of Aashadha month. People take a ritual bath and perform Mansana (charity) of hand fans, water pitchers and seasonal fruits like melons. These donations are made in name of Pitras (ancestors). Major celebration is people offering sweet water drinks and food to poor and needy. Similar rituals are observed on Nirjala Ekadashi ( celebrated on Jyestha Shukla Ekadashi) where in addition a strict Vrata is observed in honour of Lord Vishnu.

=== Rutt Raahde & Sakolade (Shravana Sankranti) ===
Rutt Raahde is a festival celebrated by Dogra women of all ages from Aashada Sankranti to Shravana Sankranti. The last day i.e. Shravana Sankranti is referred to as Sakolade or Minjraan. Young girls and women collect necks of broken earthen pitchers and insert them into ground. Seeds of Kharif crops are sown inside these pitchers. These are known as Raahde which are then decorated with rangoli patterns using natural colors. Every Sunday, women would assemble and sing folk songs and enjoy eatables like Rutt, Gheur & Pudas, at the site where Raahde are inserted. On the last day of festival i.e. Badda Rutt, women would again assemble, sing folk songs, enjoy eatables and finally immerse the Raahde in water bodies. The final day i.e. Shravana Sankranti is also known as Sakolade (named after the ear ornaments that are worn during this day.) In parts of Himachal, Sakolade are also referred to as Minjraan.

=== Thongren Da Vrat (Krishna Janmashtami) ===
Janmashtami in Dogri is also referred to as Thongren Da Vrat, meaning Vrata for Thakur (Lord Krishna). A fast is observed in honour of Sri Krishna by adults, while kids & youngsters enjoy Kite flying on this day. Girls and women decorate their palms by applying Teera, dye of an indigenous plant.

Some families have tradition of keeping cereal grains in name of Kul Devtas, Pitras (ancestors) & family members. This is known as Deyaa Parna. These cereal grains are then offered to wood of a holy tree called Jhand. This is known as Jhand Puja. The wood is covered in sacred cloth called shoaath. Clay sculptures of a couple and their children are placed on the cloth, and are worshipped. They are offered Kheer (without sugar) and Makkhan. This is followed by offering Dropads (kind of chapatis) to cows. This practice is called ‘dropad mansnaa‘. Some people also enjoy swings on tree known as peengan.

At night, people dress up their children like deities. Towns and cities witness several processions. At midnight, Sund Panjeeri is offered as Naivedya to Sri Krishna.

=== Bacch Dua (Vatsa Dwadashi) & Drubadi (Durvashtami) ===
Vatsa Dwadashi in Jammu region is celebrated on twelfth day of Krishna Paksha of Bhadrapada month as Bacch Dua and Durvashtami as Drubadi on eighth day of Shukla Paksha of Bhadrapada month. In both these festivals, women prepare small sized idols/sculptures of calves using wheat dough. These are worshipped on water bodies. Soaked Black chickpeas & Durva grass is used for Puja. Dogra dishes like Rutt and Dropad are used as Naivedya.

=== Singh Sankrant (Simha Sankranti) ===
It is celebrated on first day of solar month of Hindu Calendar i.e. Bhadrapada. The festival holds special significance in Ramban district of Jammu division. People visit Chandrabhaga river and offer floral offerings. It is popularly known by the name Singh Sankrant. Local tradition traces the origin of festival to Pandavas.

=== Tulsi Puja & Panj Bhikham (Bhishma Panchak) ===
Tulsi Puja is performed in Dogra families from Kartika Shukla Ekadashi till Kartika Purnima. This five-day period is known as Panj Bhikham (Bhishma Panchak).

On the occasion of Tulsi Puja, Dogra families would decorate the Tulsi plant pot and would write Ram Ram on them. This is known as Tulsi Da Chauntra in Dogri. They would cover the plant with Red Dupatta or Chunni. A fast is also observed on Kartika Shukla Ekadashi in honour of Lord Vishnu and Tulsi Mata. Women light up Diyas from Ekadashi till Purnima on Tulsi plant. This ceremony is known as Deeve in Dogri. Some families may also organize Tulsi Vivah with Shaligram. It is believed that Tulsi has got affinity with Shaligram.

=== Jhiri Mela (October–November) ===
An annual fair is held in the name of Baba Jitto, a simple and honest farmer who preferred to kill himself rather than submit to the unjust demands of the local landlord to part with his crop. He killed himself in the village of Jhiri, 14 km from Jammu. A legend has grown around the Baba and his followers congregate at Jhiri on the appointed day from every corner of North India; they revere him for his compassion, courage, and honesty.

=== Navratri Festival (September–October) ===
Though the yatra to the shrine of Mata Vaishno Devi is a round-the-year event, a pilgrimage undertaken during the Navratras is considered the most auspicious. In order to showcase and highlight the regional culture, heritage and traditions of the area during this period, the State Tourism Department has instituted the Navratri Festival as an annual event to be held during September/October for the nine auspicious days of the Navratras. A large number of tourists pay their obeisance to the deity during this period. This festival showcases the religious traditions as well as the popular culture of the region among the millions of pilgrims who visit the Vaishnodeviji Shrine during this period.

=== Rath Kharda Mela ===
An eight-day fair is organised in Narsingh and Annapurna Temple in Ghagwal of Samba district of Jammu division. This fair involves taking out procession of deity on a chariot. Hence named Rath Kharda Mela. Thousands of devotees are drawn from neighbouring states of Punjab and Himachal Pradesh and also other parts of Jammu region. People from hilly areas of Jammu like: Basohli, Doda, Kishtwar, Bani, Dudu Basantgarh put stalls in this fair and sell the handicrafts and woolen items like Pattus, blankets & shawls.

During this fair, the temple is decorated with flowers and lights. Devotees visit the temple and pay obeisance to the main deity, Bhagwan Narsimha. A Bhandara is also organised for the devotees. Local farmers sow their fields in the name of Bhagwan Narsimha and while harvesting their crops offer a part of it to the temple during this fair.

Besides Ghagwal, Rath Kharda Mela is also held at other places of Jammu division like: Ramgarh tehsil of Udhampur district, Parnala village in Billawar tehsil and Hatli village in Kathua.

=== Shivratri (Herath) ===
Shivaratri (lit. ''Shiva's night'') is a festival of great significance for Hindus all over the world, especially for those of Kashmiri origin settled in Jammu. On this day, Lord Siva and his spouse Parvati are worshipped with great devotion everywhere in the country. Esoterically, it is symbolic of the mystic union of Jiva (individual soul) with Paramatma (the Supreme Godhead) and it represents the high state of spiritual realization wherein the world of relativity fades away and perfect peace and calm prevail. Along with worshipping 'Shiva' people observe both social and cultural meets on this festival. They rejoice and exchange greetings with friends and relatives.

== Education ==
Jammu region has many institutes offering higher education. The colleges varies from medical colleges, to engineering colleges, and many other government and private colleges.

Some of the major higher educational institutes in Jammu Region are:

- Indian Institute of Technology, Jammu (IIT Jammu)
- Indian Institute of Management Jammu (IIM Jammu)
- All India Institute of Medical Sciences, Vijaypur, Jammu (AIIMS Vijaypur)
- Government College of Engineering and Technology, Jammu
- Government Medical College, Jammu
- Government Medical College, Kathua
- Government Medical College, Rajouri
- Government Medical College, Udhampur
- Government Medical College, Doda
- University of Jammu
- Sher-e-Kashmir University of Agricultural Sciences and Technology of Jammu
- Govt. MAM PG College, Jammu
- Govt. Gandhi Memorial Science College
- Maharaja Harisingh Agricultural Collegiate School
- Model Institute of Engineering and Technology, Jammu
- Mahant Bachittar Singh College Of Engineering and Technology, Jammu
- Sainik School, Nagrota
- Shri Mata Vaishno Devi University
- Central University of Jammu
- Cluster University of Jammu

== See also ==
- List of topics on the land and the people of "Jammu and Kashmir"
- Roman Catholic Diocese of Jammu–Srinagar
- Dogri
- Dogra
- Duggar
- Prakash Singh Chib

== Bibliography ==
- Bamzai, P. N. K. (1994), Culture and Political History of Kashmir: Ancient Kashmir, M.D. Publications Pvt. Ltd., ISBN 978-81-85880-31-0
- Jeratha, Aśoka (2000), Forts and Palaces of the Western Himalaya, Indus Publishing, pp. 5–, ISBN 978-81-7387-104-7
- Hāṇḍā, Omacanda (1998), Textiles, Costumes, and Ornaments of the Western Himalaya, Indus Publishing, pp. 178–, ISBN 978-81-7387-076-7
- Jeratha, Aśoka (1998), Dogra Legends of Art & Culture, Indus Publishing, ISBN 978-81-7387-082-8
- Hutchison, J.; Vogel, Jean Philippe (1933), History of the Panjab Hill States, Vol. 1, New Delhi: Asian Education Services (published 2014), ISBN 9788120609426
- Hutchison, J.; Vogel, Jean Philippe (1933), History of the Panjab Hill States, Vol. 2, New Delhi: Asian Education Services (published 2014)
- Huttenback, Robert A. (1961), "Gulab Singh and the Creation of the Dogra State of Jammu, Kashmir, and Ladakh" (PDF), The Journal of Asian Studies, 20 (4): 477–488, doi:10.2307/2049956, JSTOR 2049956, S2CID 162144034, archived from the original (PDF) on 15 August 2016
- Kotwal, Nek Chand (2000), Political and cultural heritage of Bhadarwah, Kishtwar, and Doda, N.C. Kotwal
- Mohammed, Jigar (April 2008), "Mian Dedo: The Identity Icon", Epilogue, pp. 51–
- Panikkar, K. M. (1930), Gulab Singh, London: Martin Hopkinson Ltd
- Sharma, Kamal Prashad (2001), Maṇimahesh Chambā Kailāsh, Indus Publishing, pp. 67–, ISBN 978-81-7387-118-4
- Singh, Bawa Satinder (1971), "Raja Gulab Singh's Role in the First Anglo-Sikh War", Modern Asian Studies, 5 (1): 35–59, doi:10.1017/s0026749x00002845, JSTOR 311654, S2CID 145500298
- Snedden, Christopher (2015), Understanding Kashmir and Kashmiris, Oxford University Press, ISBN 978-1-84904-342-7
- Stein, M. A. (1989) [first published 1900], Kalhana's Rajatarangini: A chronicle of the kings of Kasmir, Volume 2., Motilal Banarsidass, ISBN 978-81-208-0370-1
