= Government Medical Colleges in Jammu and Kashmir =

Medical institutions in Jammu and Kashmir, India

Government Medical Colleges in Jammu and Kashmir (also known as GMCs), refers to the publicly funded medical institutions in the Union Territory of Jammu and Kashmir, India. As of September 2026, there are 10 government medical colleges (including SKIMS MC) offering MBBS programmes, with a combined MBBS intake of 1,600 seats, of which 85% are filled through JKBOPEE counselling, including a sub-quota for students domiciled in the Union Territory of Ladakh. Several of these colleges also offer postgraduate (PG) medical programmes at the MD/MS and Diploma level, with a combined PG (Broad Specialist) intake of 733 seats, admitted through NEET-PG. There are a combined 72 PG (Super-Specialty) seats at DM/M.Ch level at GMC Srinagar, GMC Jammu and SKIMS, as of April 2026.

== Background ==
Medical education in Jammu and Kashmir began with the establishment of Government Medical College, Srinagar in 1959, making it the first medical college in the region. Government Medical College, Jammu followed in 1973, and the Sher-i-Kashmir Institute of Medical Sciences Medical College (SKIMS MC) was established in 1989.

A significant expansion of medical education infrastructure occurred between 2019 and 2023, with the establishment of seven new government medical colleges across underserved districts of both the Jammu and Kashmir divisions.

== List of GMCs ==
Government Medical Colleges in Jammu and Kashmir
No.	College	Location	District	Established	University / Affiliation	MBBS Seats	Intake for BOPEE	PG (Broad Specialist) Seats	PG (Super Specialty) Seats	Website
1	GMC Srinagar	Karan Nagar, Srinagar	Srinagar	1959	University of Kashmir	250	213	281	16	https://www.gmcs.ac.in/
2	GMC Jammu	Bakshi Nagar, Jammu	Jammu	1973	University of Jammu	250	213	242	8	https://gmcjammu.jk.gov.in/
3	SKIMS Medical College (SKIMS MC)	Bemna, Srinagar	Srinagar	1989	SKIMS (Note: SKIMS MC is an autonomous institution under SKIMS)	150	128	153	48	https://skimsmc.edu.in/
4	GMC Rajouri	Kheora Mehra, Rajouri	Rajouri	2019	University of Jammu	150	128	4	—	https://www.gmcrajouri.in/
5	GMC Anantnag	Dialgam, Anantnag	Anantnag	2019	University of Kashmir	150	128	18	—	gmcanantnag.ac.in
6	GMC Baramulla	Kanth bagh, Baramulla	Baramulla	2019	University of Kashmir	150	128	10	—	gmcbaramulla.ac.in
7	GMC Kathua	Near Kalibari, Kathua	Kathua	2019	University of Jammu	150	127	25	—	https://www.gmckathua.in/
8	GMC Doda	Ghat, Doda	Doda	2020	University of Jammu	150	127	—	—	https://gmcdoda.jk.gov.in/
9	GMC Handwara	Handwara	Kupwara	2023	University of Kashmir	100	85	—	—	gmchandwara.co.in
10	GMC Udhampur	Adarsh Colony, Udhampur	Udhampur	2023	University of Jammu	100	85	—	—	gmcudhampur.in

== Admission process ==
Admission to government medical colleges in Jammu and Kashmir is based on merit in NEET-UG. For the Union Territories of J&K and Ladakh, counselling is conducted by the Jammu and Kashmir Board of Professional Entrance Examinations (JKBOPEE). JKBOPEE oversees 85% of the total 1,600 seats, amounting to 1,362 MBBS seats. Of these, 96% (1,308 seats) fall under the J&K UT quota, while the remaining 4% (54 seats) are reserved for candidates domiciled in the UT of Ladakh, which currently has no government medical college of its own.

The remaining 15% (238 seats) constitute the All India Quota (AIQ), filled through the Medical Counselling Committee (MCC).

== Postgraduate medical education ==
Postgraduate medical education in Jammu and Kashmir is offered at the MD/MS level in seven of the ten government medical colleges. The three colleges established most recently — GMC Doda (2020), GMC Handwara (2023), and GMC Udhampur (2023) — are yet to receive NMC approval for postgraduate programmes. Admission is based on merit in the NEET-PG. Of the available PG seats, 50% constitute the All India Quota, filled through the Medical Counselling Committee (MCC), while the remaining 50% form the J&K UT quota, for which counselling is conducted by JKBOPEE.

== See also ==
AIIMS in Jammu and Kashmir

- AIIMS, Awantipora (Note: Under Construction)
- AIIMS, Vijaypur

List of Medical Colleges in India
