= All India Institute of Medical Sciences, Awantipora =

Medical University and Hospital in Awantipora, Jammu and Kashmir, India

- Seal of AIIMS Awantipora
- Type: Public Medical School
- Established: Under construction
- President: Dr. Pramod Garg
- Director: Dr. Sachidananda Mohanty
- Location: Awantipora, Jammu and Kashmir, India
- Campus: Rural
- Website: aiimsawantipora.edu.in

All India Institute of Medical Sciences, Awantipora also known as AIIMS Kashmir is a medical research public university and hospital in Awantipora, Pulwama district, Jammu and Kashmir, India.

== Background ==
AIIMS Awantipora is being established under the Pradhan Mantri Swasthya Suraksha Yojana (PMSSY), a Central Sector Scheme of the Government of India. It is part of the broader AIIMS network expansion under which several new AIIMS institutions have been set up across India.

=== Location ===
The institute is situated at the foothills of the Wasturwan Hills, overlooking the Jhelum River, in Awantipora, Pulwama district. The campus has direct connectivity via the Jammu–Srinagar National Highway.

=== Construction ===
The project, promoted by the Government of India, was initiated on 7 November 2020 and was expected to be completed by 2 December 2025, with an estimated cost of US$229.85 million. As of 17 October 2026, the institute has achieved 81% physical progress.

== Administration ==
On 5 September 2023, the Indian government approved 94 faculty and 244 non-faculty for the college. Professors, assistant professors, medical officers, nurses, technical and administrative positions are among the positions available.

The institute is governed under the AIIMS Act, 1956, with oversight from the Ministry of Health and Family Welfare, Government of India.

| Position | Name |
|---|---|
| President, AIIMS Awantipora | Prof. (Dr.) Pramod Garg |
| Executive Director, AIIMS Awantipora | Prof. (Dr.) Sachidananda Mohanty |

=== Academics ===
AIIMS Awantipora will include a medical college with a capacity for 100 MBBS students per year and a College of Nursing with annual intake capacity of 60 seats. Admission and on-line counselling for 15% AIQ seats for UG courses is conducted by Medical Counselling Committee.

==== Hospital and Patient Care ====
AIIMS Awantipora will have 750 bedded tertiary care hospital. Services will include an outpatient department, inpatient wards, operation theaters, intensive care units, a blood bank, and laboratory and radiology services.

== Current status ==
As of November 2025, according to Chief Minister Omar Abdullah, outpatient department services are projected to begin in March–April 2026, followed by inpatient department and academic activities by November–December 2026, with the college expected to be fully operational by the end of 2026.

On 31 July 2026, Lok Sabha was informed that AIIMS Awantipora will be completed by December 2026.

== See also ==
- Government Medical Colleges in Jammu and Kashmir
- AIIMS Vijaypur
