= COVID-19 pandemic in Jammu and Kashmir =

Ongoing COVID-19 viral pandemic in Jammu and Kashmir, India

The first case of the COVID-19 pandemic in India was reported on 30 January 2020, originating from China. Slowly, the pandemic spread to various states and union territories including the Indian-administered union territory of Jammu and Kashmir. Two suspected cases with high virus load were detected and isolated on 4 March in Government Medical College, Jammu. One of them became the first confirmed positive case on 9 March 2020. Both individuals had a travel history to Iran.

As of 13 June 2021, total number of active cases was 16284; successful recoveries/discharges was 286180 and deaths 4174. Total vaccine doses administered were 36,46,922.

== Lockdown and administrative measures ==
=== 2020 ===
On 7 March, primary schools in Jammu and Samba districts were closed down until 31 March after two suspected cases with "high viral load" were reported in Jammu. On 15 March, Shri Mata Vaishnov Devi Shrine Board asked non-resident Indians and foreigners not to visit the temple for 28 days after landing in India. On 18 March, Jammu and Kashmir banned entry of all foreign tourists.

In the last week of May 2020 testing numbers of the J&K were the highest in India at 10,000 tests per million population. On 7 June 2020, districts in the state were classified into three types of containment zones. Guidelines related to testing and quarantine protocols during the first wave included:

- Anyone entering the UT by road, rail and air has to take mandatory COVID-19 test and undergo institutional quarantine till the test results are received.
- After receiving the test results, individuals tested negative can return home but have to undertake a 14-day home quarantine. COVID positive individuals are relocated to dedicated healthcare facilities for treatment.
- Travellers can also opt for a paid hospitality quarantine by registering themselves for one at KIOSKS where the samples for tests are collected.
- Travellers from Districts designated as Red zones to Orange zone Districts within the UT to undergo same testing and quarantine regime.

Categories exempted from the mandatory quarantine protocols included pregnant women, mothers with infants below 1yr; cancer, chronically ill and dialysis patients; children below 10 yrs travelling alone; GoI personnel on duty; Travelers with COVID negative test certificate issued by ICMR approved labs and not older than 48hrs; and CAPF and Armed forces personnel reporting for active duty in the Union Territory, will be sent to their respective formations.

On 5 June, the Government ordered its employees to attend offices on a regular basis beginning 6 June. High-risk groups were advised to take extra precautions or work from home and would not be attending frontline duties or involved in public dealings. Incremental unlocking of the state extended into December 2020.

=== 2021 ===
Following a surge in covid cases in April and May 2021 in the union territory, the government administration imposed a curfew in all the districts till 17 May which was later extended till 24 May. A mass awareness drive has been started by the administration. The UT government has decided to hire retired doctors and final year medical students to deal with shortage of medical staff. Financial incentives have been announced for Healthcare workers including final year medical students, nurses and others. 23 hospitals in the UT have been designated as covid centers. These centres raise the total covid beds in Kashmir division to 1194 beds and in the Jammu division to 511 beds. The pandemic affected the government's move to Srinagar. The second wave in the union territory plateaued and started to dip by the end of May.

== Timeline ==
=== June 2020 ===
- As of 3 June 2020, all 20 districts in the Union Territory have reported confirmed positive cases. Anantnag has reported the highest number of cases in the UT whereas, Kishtwar's count is the least till date.
- As on 12 June, total number of cases in Jammu and Kashmir was

=== July 2020 ===
- On 11 July, total cases in Jammu and Kashmir crossed tally of 10000.
- As on 5 July, total number of cases in Jammu and Kashmir was 8429, with 3042 active cases, 5255 recoveries and 132 deaths.
- As on 12 July, total number of cases was 10513, with 4355 active cases, 5979 cures and 179 fatalities.
- As on 16 July, total number of cases in the UT was 12156, with 5488 active cases, 6446 recoveries and 222 fatalities.
- As on 21 July, total number of cases is 15258, with 6540 active cases, 8455 cures and 263 deaths.

=== August 2020 ===
- As of 1 August, the total number of cases in Jammu and Kashmir was 20972, including 7713 active cases, 12871 cures and 388 deaths.
- As of 4 August, the total number of cases in Jammu and Kashmir was 22396, including 7123 active cases, 14856 cures and 417 deaths.
- As of 9 August, the total number of cases was 24390, including 7264 active cases, 16667 cures and 459 deaths.
- As of 11 August, the total number of cases was 25931, including 7462 active cases, 17979 cures and 490 deaths.
- As of 14 August, the total number of cases was 27489, including 7027 active cases, 19942 recoveries and 520 deaths.
- As of 19 August, the total number of cases was 30034, including 6965 active cases, 22497 cures and 572 fatalities.
- As of 23 August, the total number of cases in the UT was 33705, including 7246 active cases, 25205 recoveries and 624 deaths.

=== September 2020 ===
- As of 1 September, the total number of cases in Jammu and Kashmir was 38223, including 8022 active cases, 29484 cures and 717 deaths.
- As of 6 September, the total number of cases in the UT was 43557, including 10646 active cases, 32327 recoveries and 784 deaths.
- As of 16 September, the total number of cases was 58244, including 19503 active cases, 37809 recoveries and 932 deaths.
- As of 21 September, the total number of cases was 65026, including 21887 active cases, 42115 cures and 1024 deaths.
- As of 28 September, the total number of cases was 73014, including 17601 active cases, 54267 recoveries and 1146 deaths.

=== October 2020 ===
- As of 2 October, the total number of cases in Jammu and Kashmir was 77253, including 16089 active cases, 59952 cures and 1212 deaths.
- As of 3 October, the total number of cases was 78228, including 15646 active cases, 61351 cures and 1231 deaths.
- As of 6 October, the total number of cases was 80476, including 13712 active cases, 65496 recoveries and 1268 deaths.
- As of 14 October, the total number of cases was 85409, including 9739 active cases, 74318 cures and 1352 fatalities.
- As of 21 October, the total number of cases was 89582, including 8088 active cases, 80092 cures and 1402 deaths.
- As of 29 October, the total number of cases was 93764, including 6928 active cases, 85370 recoveries and 1466 deaths.

=== November 2020 ===
- As of 4 November, the total number of cases in Jammu and Kashmir was 96700, including 5935 active cases, 89254 cures and 1511 deaths.
- As of 10 November, the total number of cases was 99844, including 5415 active cases, 92880 cures and 1549 deaths.
- On 11 November, the UT of Jammu and Kashmir crossed the grim milestone of 100000 covid cases.
- As of 23 November, the total number of cases was 106899, including 5431 active cases, 99827 recoveries and 1641 deaths.

=== December 2020 ===
- As of 2 December, the total number of cases in Jammu and Kashmir was 111130, including 4951 active cases, 104471 cures and 1708 deaths.
- As of 6 December, the total number of cases was 113288, including 5170 active cases, 106372 cures and 1746 deaths.
- As of 13 December, the total number of cases was 116008, including 4702 active cases, 109507 cures and 1799 fatalities.
- As of 17 December, the total number of cases was 117317, including 4327 active cases, 111164 cures and 1826 deaths.
- As of 28 December, the total number of cases was 120293, including 3157 active cases, 115261 recoveries and 1875 deaths.
- As of 31 December, the total number of cases in the UT was 120971, including 3009 active cases, 116079 recoveries and 1883 fatalities.

=== January 2021 ===
- As of 3 January, the total number of cases in Jammu and Kashmir was 121653, including 2975 active cases, 116792 cures and 1886 deaths.
- As of 6 January, the total number of cases was 122049, including 2459 active cases, 117690 cures and 1900 deaths.
- As of 10 January, the total number of cases was 122538, including 2011 active cases, 118617 cures and 1910 deaths.
- As of 21 January, the total number of cases was 123764, including 1111 active cases, 120729 cures and 1924 fatalities.
- As of 27 January, the total number of cases in the UT was 124234, including 1050 active cases, 121253 recoveries and 1931 deaths.

=== February 2021 ===
- As of 1 February, the total number of cases in Jammu and Kashmir was 124550, including 709 active cases, 121905 cures and 1936 deaths.
- As of 13 February, the total number of cases was 125268, including 616 active cases, 122703 recoveries and 1949 deaths.
- As of 20 February, the total number of cases was 125783, including 700 active cases, 123129 cures and 1954 deaths.

=== March 2021 ===
- As of 6 March, the total number of cases in Jammu and Kashmir was 126932, including 882 active cases, 124089 cures and 1961 deaths.
- As of 14 March, the total number of cases in Jammu and Kashmir was 127640, including 920 active cases, 124746 recoveries and 1974 deaths.
- As of 29 March, the total number of cases in Jammu and Kashmir was 130228, including 2110 active cases, 126129 recoveries and 1989 deaths.

=== April 2021 ===
- As of 4 April, the total number of cases in Jammu and Kashmir was 133012, including 3955 active cases, 127049 recoveries and 2008 deaths.
- As of 20 April, the total number of cases in Jammu and Kashmir was 150238, including 13470 active cases, 134697 cures and 2071 deaths.

=== May 2021 ===
- As of 7 May, the total number of cases in Jammu and Kashmir was 206954, including 44307 active cases, 160035 recoveries and 2612 deaths.
- As of 11 May, the total number of cases was 224898, including 50701 active cases, 171350 recoveries and 2847 deaths.
- As of 18 May, total number of cases was 251919, including 50925 active cases, 197701 cures and 3293 deaths.
- As of 25 May, total number of cases is 275822, including 44918 active cases, 227242 cures and 3662 fatalities.

=== June 2021 ===
- As of 17 June, the total number of cases in Jammu and Kashmir was 310017, including 10602 active cases, 295189 recoveries and 4226 deaths.
- As of 25 June, the total number of cases in Jammu and Kashmir was 313974, including 6157 active cases, 303526 recoveries and 4291 deaths.

=== July 2021 ===
- As of 19 July, the total number of cases in Jammu and Kashmir is 320024, including 1773 active cases, 313886 recoveries and 4365 deaths.

=== August 2021 ===
- As of 28 August, the total number of cases in Jammu and Kashmir is 324979, including 1211 active cases, 319362 recoveries and 4406 deaths.

=== September 2021 ===
- As of 23 September, the total number of cases in Jammu and Kashmir was 328418, including 1536 active cases, 322463 recoveries and 4419 deaths.
- As of 26 September, the total number of cases was 328881, including 1563 active cases, 322897 cures and 4421 deaths.

=== Oct to Dec 2021 ===
- As of 6 October, the total number of cases in Jammu and Kashmir was 324627, including 1065 active cases, 322463 recoveries and 4426 deaths.
- As of 8 October, the total number of cases was 330352, including 1099 active cases, 324827 cures and 4426 fatalities.
- As of 23 October, the total number of cases was 331566, including 862 active cases, 326275 recoveries and 4429 deaths.
- As of 2 November, the total number of cases was 332249, including 902 active cases, 326915 cures and 4432 deaths.
- As of 14 December, the total number of cases was 338990, including 1442 active cases, 333050 cures and 4498 fatalities.
- As of 29 December, the total number of cases in the UT was 340924, including 1296 active cases, 335103 cures and 4525 fatalities.

=== Jan to Mar 2022 ===
- As of 5 January, the total number of cases in Jammu and Kashmir was 342001, including 1541 active cases, 335930 recoveries and 4530 deaths.
- As of 15 January, the total number of cases was 364555, including 21541 active cases, 338453 cures and 4561 deaths.
- As of 25 January, the total number of cases in the UT was 409166, including 47376 active cases, 357163 recoveries and 4627 deaths.
- As of 11 February, the total number of cases was 449873, including 7424 active cases, 437708 recoveries and 4741 fatal cases.
- As of 21 February, the total number of cases was 452410, including 1692 active cases, 445971 cures and 4747 deaths.
- As of 19 March, the total number of cases was 453520, including 133 active cases, 448637 cures and 4750 deaths.

=== April to June 2022 ===
- As of 14 April, the total number of cases in Jammu and Kashmir was 453909, including 77 active cases, 449082 cures and 4750 deaths.
- As of 30 April, the total number of cases was 454047, including 66 active cases, 449230 recoveries and 4751 deaths.
- As of 10 May, the total number of cases was 454113, including 56 active cases, 449306 recoveries and 4751 deaths.
- As of 13 May, the total number of cases was 454125, including 57 active cases, 449317 cures and 4751 deaths.
- As of 28 May, the total number of cases was 454227, including 63 active cases, 449412 recoveries and 4752 deaths.
- As of 31 May, the total number of cases was 454248, including 64 active cases, 449432 recoveries and 4752 fatal cases.
- As of 10 June, the total number of cases was 454314, including 68 active cases, 449494 cures and 4752 fatal cases.
- As of 16 June, the total number of cases was 454420, including 126 active cases, 449542 cures and 4752 deaths.

=== July to September 2022 ===
- As of 9 July, the total number of cases in Jammu and Kashmir was 455807, including 692 active cases, 450358 cures and 4757 deaths.
- As of 26 August, the total number of cases was 477119, including 1835 active cases, 470502 recoveries and 4782 deaths.
- As of 31 August, the total number of cases was 477784, including 1091 active cases, 471911 cures and 4782 fatal cases.
- As of 10 September, the total number of cases was 478685, including 480 active cases, 473421 cures and 4784 deaths.
- As of 24 September, the total number of cases was 479062, including 168 active cases, 474109 recoveries and 4785 deaths.

== COVID-19 Vaccines with Approval for Emergency or Conditional Usage ==
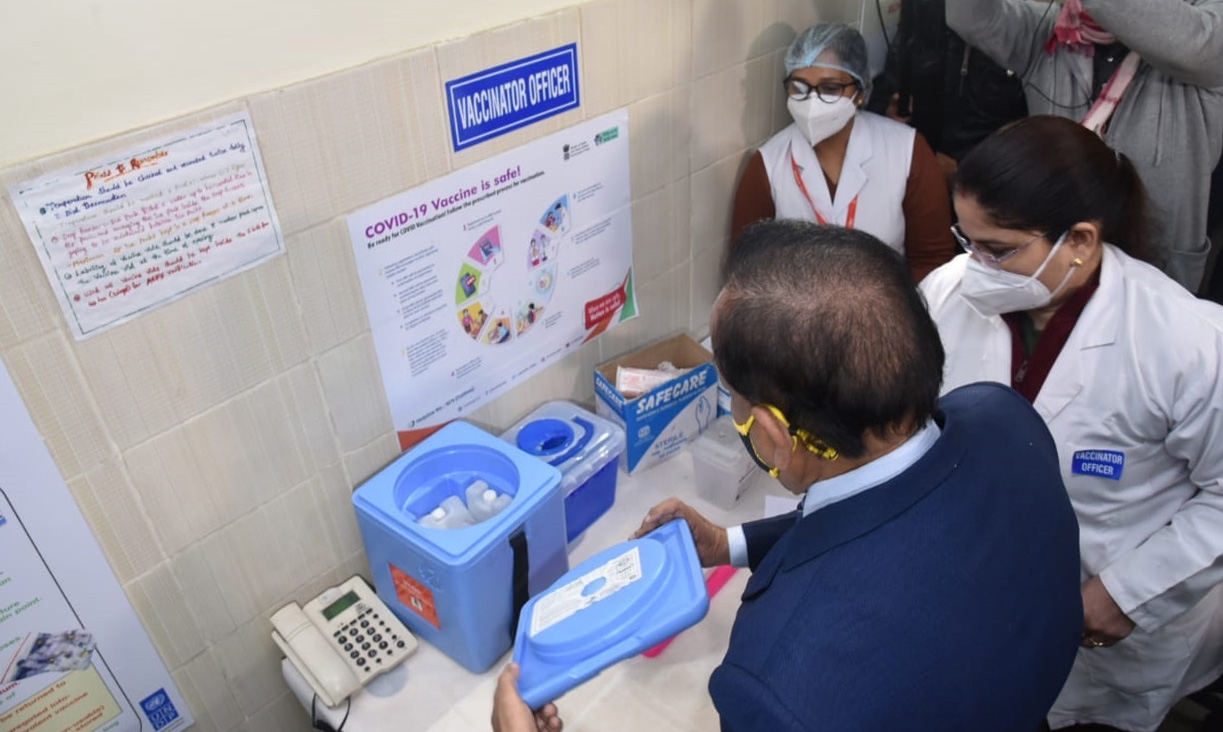
Union Minister for Health & Family Welfare, Dr. Harsh Vardhan visiting the GTB Hospital, Shahdara to review the preparedness of Dry Run of COVID-19 vaccine, in Delhi on January 02, 2021.

=== Covishield ===
On 1 January 2021, the Drug Controller General of India, approved the emergency or conditional use of AstraZeneca’s COVID-19 vaccine AZD1222 (marketed as Covishield). Covishield is developed by the University of Oxford and its spin-out company, Vaccitech. It's a viral vector vaccine based on replication-deficient Adenovirus that causes cold in Chimpanzees. It can be stored, transported and handled at normal refrigerated conditions (two-eight degrees Celsius/ 36-46 degrees Fahrenheit). It has a shelf-life of at least six months.

On 12 January 2021 first batches of Covishield vaccine was despatched from the Serum Institute of India.

=== Covaxin ===
On 2 January 2021, BBV152 (marketed as Covaxin), first indigenous vaccine, developed by Bharat Biotech in association with the Indian Council of Medical Research and National Institute of Virology received approval from the Drug Controller General of India for its emergency or conditional usage.

On 14 January 2021 first batches of Covaxin vaccine was despatched from the Bharat Biotech, albeit it was still in the third phase of testing.

=== Others ===
On 19 May 2021, Dr Reddy's Labs received Emergency Use Authorisation for anti-COVID drug 2-DG. On 21 February 2022, Drugs Controller General of India granted approval to Biological E's COVID-19 vaccine Corbevax, that can be used for children between 12 and 18 years of age.

On 21 October 2021, India completed administering of one billion Covid vaccines in the country.

On 8 January 2022, India crossed 1.5 billion Covid vaccines milestone in the country.

On 19 February 2022, India crossed 1.75 billion Covid vaccines milestone in the country.

== See also ==
- COVID-19 pandemic in India
- COVID-19 pandemic in the World
