= Janglatmandi =

- Area
- State: Jammu and Kashmir
- District: Anantnag
- Named for: Hospitals
- Time zone: UTC+5:30 (IST)
- PIN: 192101

Janglatmandi (Urdu; جنگلات منڈی)is a neighborhood located in Anantnag district, Jammu and Kashmir, India. The Government Medical College, Anantnag is located in Janglat Mandi. Janglat Mandi is usually considered as a very trafficked place due to poor traffic management, the authorities have proposed new plans to overcome this.

On 31 December 2020, A Police officer Named( Mohd Shafi Khan) Died due to heart attack outside of the hospital with his duty boots on, all the major police officials paid rich tribute to him.

== Nearby locations ==
An Eid Gah is also located in Janglatmandi known as Hanfia Eid Gah Janglatmandi.
