= Education in Jammu and Kashmir =

Education in Jammu and Kashmir is based on 5-tier model which includes primary schools, middle schools, higher secondary schools, Colleges and University. As per the census of 2011, Jammu and Kashmir has the literacy rate of 68%. However, there has been an increase in the numbers in recent years. The has been a recent focus on quality higher education in Jammu and Kashmir.

Official Website = jk-edu.in

== History ==
The modern education system was introduced in Kashmir in the second half of the 19th century by Christian missionaries. Maharaja Ranbir Singh's School was the only school run by the state in 1874. In 1880, J.H. Knowles opened the first missionary school was opened in Srinagar.

== Higher Education ==
=== Universities ===
There are two central universities and nine state universities in the Jammu and Kashmir.

Universities in Jammu and Kashmir
University	Location	Type	Established	Specialization	Sources
University of Kashmir	Srinagar	State	1948	General	
University of Jammu	Jammu	State	1969	General	
Central Sanskrit University - Shree Ranbir Campus	Jammu	Central	1971	Sanskrit	
Sher-e-Kashmir University of Agricultural Sciences and Technology of Kashmir	Srinagar	State	1982	Agriculture	
Sher-i-Kashmir Institute of Medical Sciences	Srinagar	State	1983	Medical Sciences	
Sher-e-Kashmir University of Agricultural Sciences and Technology of Jammu	Jammu	State	1999	Agriculture	
Shri Mata Vaishno Devi University	Katra	State	2004	Science, technology	
Islamic University of Science and Technology	Awantipora	State	2005	Science, technology	
Baba Ghulam Shah Badhshah University	Rajauri	State	2005	General	
Central University of Jammu	Jammu	Central	2009	General	
Central University of Kashmir	Srinagar	Central	2009	General	
Cluster University of Jammu	Jammu	State	2016	General	
Cluster University of Srinagar	Srinagar	State	2016	General	

== Entrance examinations ==
The Jammu and Kashmir Board of Professional Entrance Examinations (JKBOPEE) is an independent entity empowered to autonomously administer Entrance Tests and determine the selection of candidates for diverse professional courses. The range of entrance tests overseen by JKBOPEE encompasses the Polytechnic Entrance Test (PET), Common Entrance Test (CET) specifically for engineering, B.Ed, Postgraduate Diploma Entrance Tests, and Paramedical Entrance Test. In addition to coordinating entrance examinations, the board assumes the responsibility for facilitating admissions and counseling processes for both undergraduate (UG) and postgraduate (PG) medical courses, aligning with NEET UG and PG scores, respectively.

In 2002, the Jammu and Kashmir Board of Professional Entrance Examinations Act was enacted by the State Legislature, leading to the establishment of the Jammu and Kashmir Board of Professional Entrance under the provisions of the Act. This new board replaced the previously existing Competent Authority Entrance Examinations. The legislative action aimed to empower the examining body to conduct entrance tests with increased vigor, allowing it to carry out candidate selection independently, objectively, and with enhanced efficiency.

The composition of the JKBOPEE includes a chairman and other members appointed by the Government. The chairman, a full-time paid official, is appointed by the Government. Additionally, the board has other full-time officers, such as the secretary, controller of examinations, financial advisor/chief accounts Officer, and law officer. Alongside these officers, the board is supported by subordinate staff who contribute to its overall functioning.
