= Ali Mohammad Jan =

Kashmiri Physician (1914 – 1988)

- علی محمد جان فاضلی
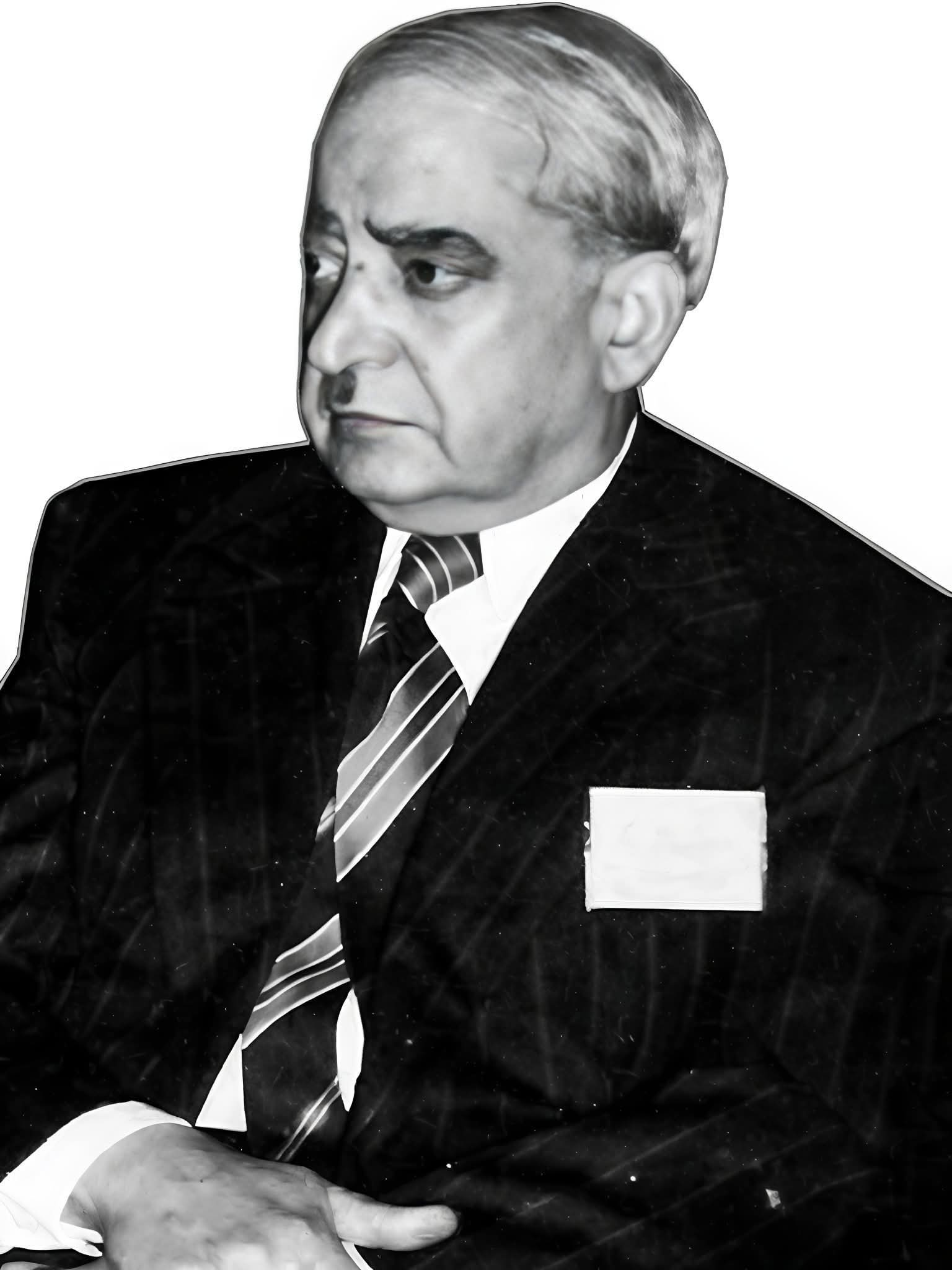
- Born: Ali Mohammad Fazili; September 3, 1914; Srinagar, Jammu and Kashmir
- Died: October 31, 1988 (aged 74)
- Burial place: Srinagar, Jammu and Kashmir
- Education: King Edward Medical College, Lahore (MBBS); Royal College of Physicians of Edinburgh (DCH), (MRCP)
- Occupations: Physician, medical educator
- Known for: Diagnostic skill and patient care
- Title: Luqman of Kashmir
- Father: Ghulam Rasool Fazili
- Awards: Padma Shri (1975)

Ali Mohammad Fazili (3 September 1914 – 31 October 1988), commonly known as Dr. Ali Jan was a Kashmiri physician known for his diagnostic skills and patient care. Known locally as the "Luqman of Kashmir", he became well known in the region for his medical expertise and dedication to the welfare of his community. He was awarded the Padma Shri in 1975 for his contributions to the field of medicine.

== Early life and education ==
Born on 3 September 1914 in Gojwara, Srinagar, Ali Jan was born to the Fazili family. He completed his MBBS degree from King Edward Medical College, Lahore, in 1937.

He pursued postgraduate studies in the United Kingdom, earning a Diploma in Child Health (DCH) and membership of the Royal College of Physicians (MRCP, Edinburgh).

== Medical career ==
Ali Jan began his medical career by working in rural areas across Jammu and Kashmir, providing healthcare for over a decade. After completing his studies in the United Kingdom, he joined government medical services, including a period at the Chest and Disease Hospital in Drogjan, Srinagar. He later resigned to establish a private practice.

He was known for his capacity to diagnose various ailments through physical examination, often relying less on advanced diagnostic tests. Locally, he was sometimes referred to as a "magic healer" or "Luqman-e-Kashmir" (Note: meaning Luqman of Kashmir, referring to the Quranic figure Luqman, and honouring Ali Jan as a wise and insightful healer in the Kashmir.) due to his reputation for accurate diagnoses. He was widely believed to possess a Dast-e-Shifa, or the power of healing through his touch.

Jan built a residence in Magharmal Bagh, Srinagar, which also functioned as his clinic. The building remains a local landmark, for his contributions to healthcare in the region, though the clinic has been unoccupied since the death of his second wife, Dr. Tajwar.

Jan was involved in several medical and public health institutions in Jammu and Kashmir. He served as funder and president of the Rotary Club of Kashmir and the Tuberculosis Association of Kashmir, through which he participated in initiatives providing free medical consultations in remote villages. He also contributed to medical education and research in the region and played a role in the establishment of Sher-i-Kashmir Institute of Medical Sciences (SKIMS) as a tertiary care and super speciality hospital. Jan served as vice-president of the Governing Body of SKIMS, Soura, and chaired its Apical Selection Committee. In addition, he was a member of the Jammu and Kashmir State Health and Family Planning Advisory Committee.

=== Awards ===
In recognition of his services to medicine and public health, the Government of India honoured Jan with the Padma Shri, India's fourth-highest civilian honour in 1975. The award was conferred in the category of Medicine.

== Death and commemoration ==
Some sources state that Ali Jan died of pancreatic cancer on 31 October 1988 in a hospital in the United States and was later returned to Srinagar for burial.

Thirty-six years after his death, the Kashmir Care Foundation (KCF), under its "Kashmiri Global Connect" initiative, organized an event titled Clinical Sciences: Treatment Using Local Knowledge to honour his life and contributions.

Dr. Ali Jan road in Srinagar, connecting Downtown and SKIMS, Soura, was named in his memory.
