= Government Medical College, Baramulla =

Medical college in Baramulla, India

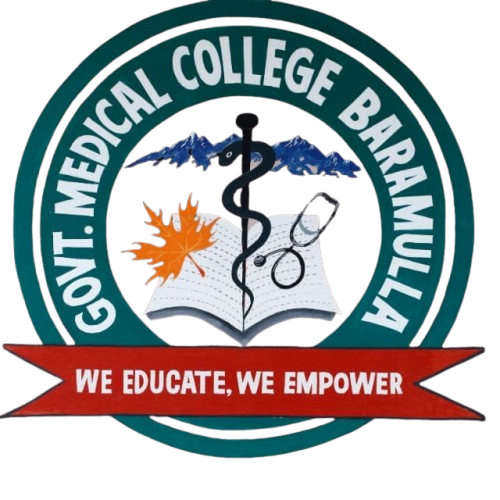
- Type: Public Medical College and Hospital
- Established: 2019; 7 years ago
- Accreditation: National Medical Commission
- Affiliations: University of Kashmir
- Principal: Dr. Majid Jahangir
- Undergraduates: 150 per year
- Location: Kanth Bagh, Baramulla, J&K, India
- Campus: Urban
- Colors: Green and White
- Website: gmcbaramulla.ac.in

Government Medical College, Baramulla (also known as GMC Baramulla) is a government medical college located in Baramulla district of Jammu and Kashmir, India. Established in 2019, the college is affiliated with the University of Kashmir and recognized by the National Medical Commission (NMC). The institution offers undergraduate and postgraduate medical education and is attached to Associated Hospital GMC Baramulla, a tertiary care teaching hospital, which is the largest hospital in the North Kashmir. It caters to the whole population of North Kashmir and part of Central Kashmir. OPD of the Associated hospital receives nearly 4000 patients on a daily basis. As of 2026, the combined MBBS intake stands at 150 seats per year.

== History ==
Government Medical College, Baramulla was established by the Government of Jammu and Kashmir in 2019 as part of the expansion of medical education infrastructure in the Union Territory. The college admitted its first batch of MBBS students during the 2019–20 academic session with an initial intake capacity of 100 students.

In 2025, the annual MBBS intake capacity was increased to 150 seats following approval from the National Medical Commission.

The institution introduced postgraduate medical courses in selected specialties during the mid-2020s.

== Academics ==
Government Medical College, Baramulla offers undergraduate and postgraduate education in medicine, nursing, and allied health sciences.The undergraduate medical programme offered by the institution is the Bachelor of Medicine and Bachelor of Surgery (MBBS). The college also offers postgraduate medical training through Doctor of Medicine (MD), Master of Surgery (MS), and Diplomate of National Board (DNB) programmes in selected specialties.The institution also offers undergraduate courses in nursing and allied health sciences, including B.Sc. Nursing and paramedical programmes in medical laboratory technology, radiology and imaging technology, operation theatre technology, renal dialysis technology, and anaesthesia technology.

Admission to the MBBS course is conducted through the National Eligibility cum Entrance Test (NEET-UG). Admission to MD, MS, and DNB programmes is conducted through National Eligibility and Entrance Test (NEET-PG). Admissions to nursing and paramedical programmes are conducted through the Jammu and Kashmir Board of Professional Entrance Examinations (JKBOPEE).

The college is affiliated with the University of Kashmir and follows the academic regulations prescribed by the National Medical Commission.

== Campus ==
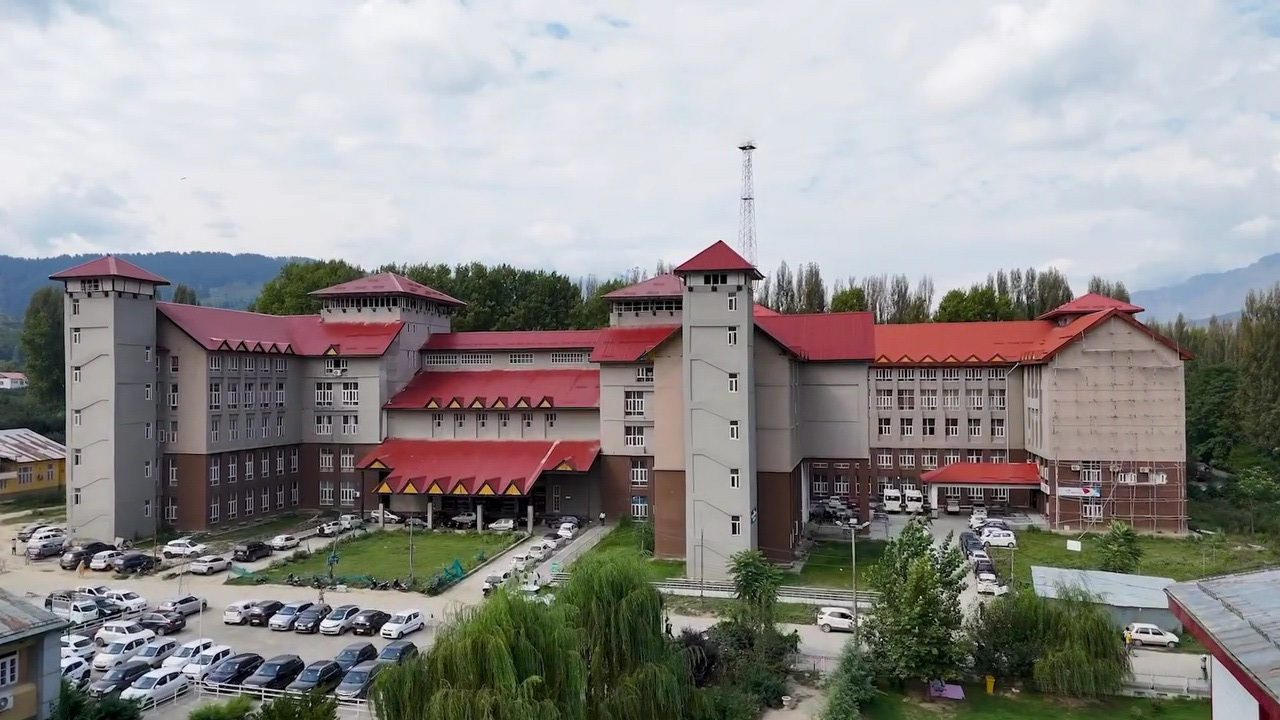
Academic Block

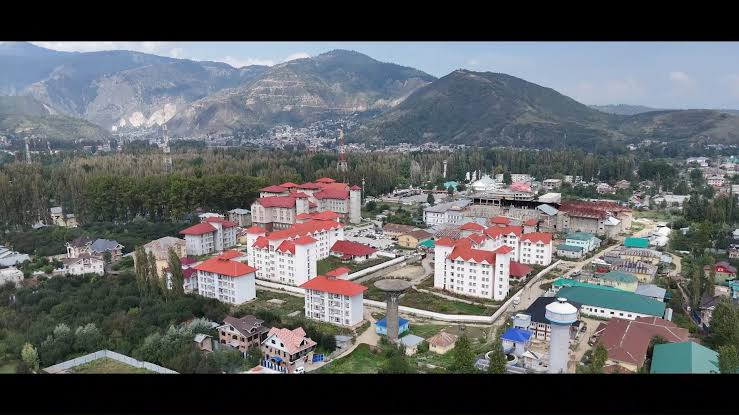
Ariel view of GMC Baramulla Campus

The college campus is located at Kanthbagh in Baramulla district. The academic complex, teaching hospital, and student hostels are situated within the same campus area.

The campus includes lecture theatres, departmental laboratories, a central library, demonstration rooms, skill and simulation laboratories, and separate hostel facilities for male and female students.

== Associated Hospital ==
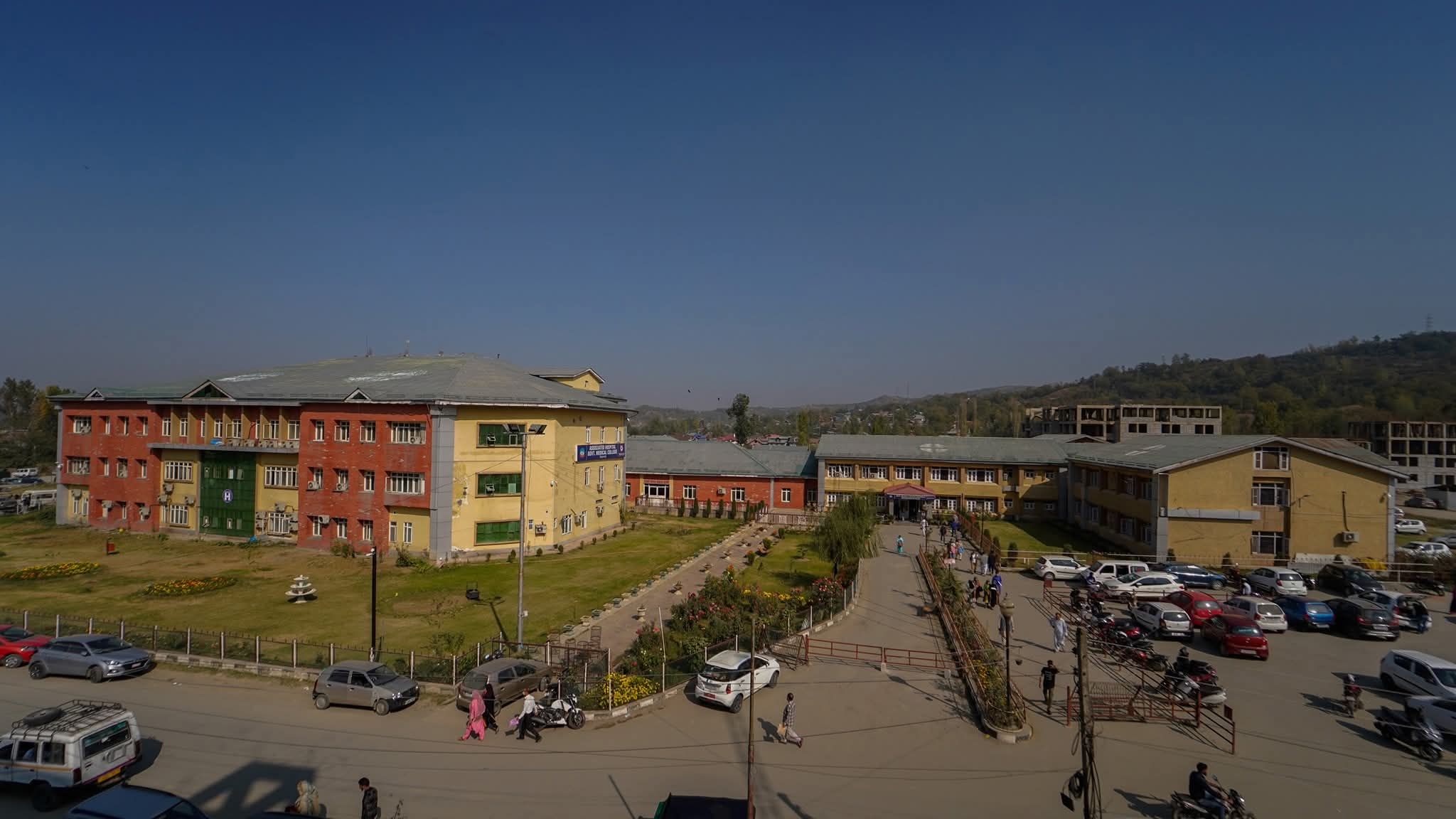
Associated Hospital GMC Baramulla

Associated Hospital GMC Baramulla functions as the teaching hospital of the institution. The hospital provides tertiary healthcare services to patients from Baramulla district and other parts of North Kashmir.

The associated hospital of Government Medical College Baramulla traces its origins to the State Hospital Baramulla, established in 1932 with a capacity of 10 beds. It was upgraded to a district hospital in 1962. Its bed strength was further expanded to 100 in 1971 and increased again in 1992. The hospital was originally located in the Main Bazar area of Baramulla town before being shifted in 2013 to a new campus at Kanth Bagh with a capacity of 300 beds. In 2019, administrative control was transferred from the Directorate of Health Services, Kashmir, to the Department of Health and Medical Education, Jammu and Kashmir, following which it became the associated hospital of Government Medical College Baramulla.

The hospital has departments in major clinical specialties and serves as a training centre for undergraduate and postgraduate medical students. As of the mid-2020s, the hospital had a capacity of approximately 300 beds, with expansion works underway for additional hospital infrastructure.

== See also ==
- Government Medical Colleges in Jammu and Kashmir
