= All India Institute of Medical Sciences, Vijaypur =

University and hospital in Jammu, India

All India Institute of Medical Sciences, Vijaypur, Jammu
- Seal of AIIMS Vijaypur, Jammu
- Motto: Aarogya param baghya
- Type: Public
- Established: 2020; 6 years ago
- Affiliations: Autonomous
- President: Lt. Gen. (Dr.) C. S. Narayanan, VSM***
- Director: Dr. Sanjeev Sinha
- Faculty: 80
- Students: 281
- Undergraduates: 281
- Postgraduates: 45
- Location: Vijaypur, Samba, Jammu, Jammu and Kashmir, India; 32.564°N 75.030°E
- Campus: Urban
- Website: www.aiimsjammu.edu.in

All India Institute of Medical Sciences, Vijaypur, Jammu also known as AIIMS Jammu is a public medical research university and hospital in Vijaypur, Samba district, Jammu division, Jammu and Kashmir, India.

== History ==
On 7 November 2015, All India Institute of Medical Sciences for Jammu division, Jammu and Kashmir was conceived by the Government of India. Prime Minister Narendra Modi laid the foundation stone of the institute on 3 February 2019, and inaugurated on 20 February 2024.

== Academics ==
The institute became operational with the first batch of 50 MBBS students, one of the four AIIMS(s) to become operational in academic year 2020-21.The seats capacity was further increased with an intake of 62 MBBS students in academic year 2021-22.

== See also ==
- Government Medical Colleges in Jammu and Kashmir
