= Medical Counselling Committee =

Indian medical education admissions organisation

Medical Counselling Committee (MCC)
- Organization of Directorate General of Health Service, MoHFW, Government of India

- Medical Counselling Committee

Agency overview
- Formed: 2012 (13 years ago)
- Jurisdiction: Government of India
- Headquarters: Room Number 354, DGHS Ministry Of Health & Family Welfare, Nirman Bhawan, Delhi - 110011
- Agency executive: NMC; Medical Council of India; Dental Council of India; DGHS, India; NBEMS
- Parent department: Ministry of Education (India), Ministry of Health and Family Welfare New Delhi.
- Website: mcc.nic.in

The Medical Counselling Committee (MCC) is an organisation under the Directorate General of Health Services (DGHS) affiliated to the Ministry of Health and Family Welfare, Government of India.

MCC is responsible for allotting seats for undergraduate, postgraduate(medical /dental)and super-specialty courses in government-run/aided colleges and deemed-to-be-university colleges.

MCC allots seats online on the basis of the candidate's score in the National Eligibility cum Entrance Test (NEET). Factors considered during allotment are merit, reservation eligibility and the preference list submitted by the candidate.

== Under-Graduate admissions ==
The MCC conducts the seat allotment process for 15.0% (All India quota, AIQ) seats in all government-run/aided colleges and variable number of seats in deemed colleges for MBBS and BDS courses.

Usually, the counselling starts a few days after the declaration of the result of NEET-UG exam and the counselling scheme, counselling schedule, list of participating institutes, seat matrix and frequently asked questions are put up on its website (referenced below).
