= Government Medical College, Handwara =

Medical college in Jammu and Kashmir, India

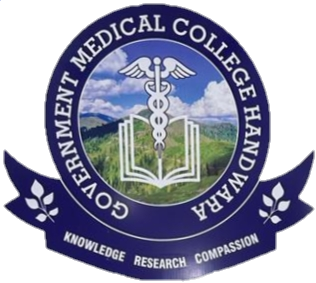
- Motto: Knowledge Research Compassion
- Type: Medical college and hospital
- Established: 2023; 3 years ago
- Affiliations: National Medical Commission
- Academic affiliations: University of Kashmir
- Principal: Dr. Khurshid Ahmad Wani
- Location: Handwara, Jammu and Kashmir, India
- Campus: Urban
- Website: gmchandwara.co.in

Government Medical College, Handwara (Urdu: گورنمنٹ میڈیکل کالج ھندوڑہ, Hindi: सरकारी मेडिकल कॉलेज, हंदवाड़ा) is a secondary referral Government Medical college in Handwara, Jammu and Kashmir, India. It was established in the year 2023. The college is affiliated with the University of Kashmir and is recognized by National Medical Commission. The hospital associated with the college is one of the largest hospitals in the Kupwara district. The selection to the college is done on the basis of merit through National Eligibility and Entrance Test. Yearly undergraduate student intake is 100 from the year 2023.

== Courses ==
Government Medical College, Handwara undertakes education and training of MBBS courses. This college has been offering 100 MBBS seats since 2023.

In September 2025, GMC Handwara was allotted 24 Diplomate of National Board (DNB) seats across various departments five in Medicine, two in Surgery, five in Paediatrics, four in Pathology, two in Pharmacology, two in Social and Preventive Medicine, and four in Anaesthesia. Over the past decade, Jammu and Kashmir has witnessed progress in the education sector, with the establishment of several state-of-the-art, high-quality institutions.

== History ==
In 2019, the Government of India approved the establishment of Government Medical College Handwara under the centrally sponsored scheme for new medical colleges, at an estimated cost of ₹325 crore. The foundation stone was laid by Union Home Minister Amit Shah on 24 October 2021.

The National Medical Commission granted the Letter of Permission on 24 March 2023, allowing the first MBBS batch to commence in the 2023 academic session. Construction and full operationalization faced some delays due to floods and logistical challenges in the region, with revised completion targets extending into 2026–2027.

== See also ==
- List of medical colleges in India
- Government Medical Colleges in Jammu and Kashmir
