= Model Institute of Engineering and Technology, Jammu =

- MIET
- Type: Engineering College
- Established: 1998; 28 years ago
- Affiliations: AICTE, University of Jammu
- Principal: Ankur Gupta
- Location: Jammu, Jammu and Kashmir, India
- Website: www.mietjammu.in

Model Institute of Engineering and Technology (MIET) is a technical institution located in Jammu, Jammu and Kashmir, India. The institution was opened in 1998 and is approved by the All India Council for Technical Education and affiliated with the University of Jammu.

MIET is accredited by the National Assessment and Accreditation Council with "A" Grade (NAAC), while the departments of Electronics, Communications, Computer Science and Engineering were accredited by the National Board of Accreditation (NBA).. MIET is accredited with "A" grade by NAAC and was awarded the "Best Institution award" in 2014 by all north Indian engineering colleges by NITTR. MIET is ranked 51st in the top 100 tech enabled institutions in the recent rankings published by Dataquest.

== Departments and courses ==
The college offers different undergraduate and postgraduate courses in Engineering. This college has the departments of Computer Science & Engineering, Mechanical Engineering, Information Technology, Electrical Engineering, Electronics & Communication, Civil Engineering.
