= Sher-i-Kashmir Institute of Medical Sciences =

Medical institute in India

- شیر ای کشمیر انسٹیٹیوٹ آف میڈیکل سائنسز
- Other name: SKIMS
- Type: Semi-autonomous; Institute under State Legislature Act
- Established: 5 December 1982 (43 years ago)
- Affiliations: UGC, NMC, INC, AIU
- Chairperson: Lieutenant Governor of Jammu and Kashmir
- Director: Mohammad Ashraf Ganie
- Location: Srinagar, Jammu and Kashmir, 190011, India; 34°8′8.4156″N 74°48′4.1976″E
- Campus: Urban
- Website: Soura: skims.ac.in Bemina: skimsmc.edu.in
- Interactive map of the SKIMS main Campus in Soura

Sher-i-Kashmir Institute of Medical Sciences (SKIMS) is a government medical institute and tertiary-care teaching hospital located at Soura in Srinagar, in the Indian union territory of Jammu and Kashmir. It was established through an initiative involving a charitable trust and the Government of Jammu and Kashmir. The institute provides specialised medical services and conducts medical education and research.

SKIMS operates under a special legislative framework and is governed by a Governing Body chaired by the Lieutenant governor of Jammu and Kashmir. Its facilities include a super-speciality hospital, academic and research departments, a nursing college, a paramedical college, the State Cancer Institute, a maternity hospital, and affiliated medical institutions.

== History ==
=== Origins ===
The origins of SKIMS date back to 21 November 1972, when a group of associates of Sheikh Mohammad Abdullah proposed the establishment of a public charitable trust to set up a medical institute in Srinagar. The Sher-i-Kashmir National Medical Institute Trust (SKNMIT) was formally registered on 19 May 1973, with Sheikh Abdullah as a lifetime chairman.

In December 1972, Sheikh Abdullah approached the then Chief Minister of Jammu and Kashmir, Syed Mir Qasim, seeking government assistance and the leasing of land at Soura for the proposed institution. Qasim was among the ten founding trustees of the organisation. Dr Ali Mohammad Jan was also involved in the establishment of the trust and served as its vice chairman.

The government had separately been considering the construction of a 500-bed hospital at Soura. Through Government Order No. 872-HD of 1973, issued in October that year, it sanctioned the lease of 292 kanals and 8 marlas of land at Zoonimar to the Trust for 40 years at an annual rent of ₹101. The Government Dispensary at Soura, along with its associated buildings and land, was transferred to the Trust.

Apart from government land, the proposed institute received contributions from private individuals. Bhai Anant Singh Gauri, a Sikh businessman, donated more than 50 kanals of land through his family trust in 1978. In a letter dated 14 January 1978, Sheikh Abdullah acknowledged the donation and thanked the Gauri family. Ward No. 4 of SKIMS was subsequently named after him. According to records of court concerning the Trust's properties, Raj Sawhney, who served as the secretary of the Trust, also donated around 50 kanals of land.

=== Establishment ===
The Government of Jammu and Kashmir took several steps during the 1970s to transfer land and other properties to the Trust. These included the transfer of Kashmir Nursing Home at Gupkar Road, Srinagar, in August 1976, along with its buildings and equipment.

On 18 January 1977, the government renamed the proposed 500-bed hospital as the Institute of Medical Sciences. A formal agreement between the government and the Trust contributed the land and associated facilities at Soura, while the government assumed responsibility for construction, equipment, staffing and other expenses. The agreement also established a Governing Body chaired by the Chief Minister of Jammu and Kashmir, with cabinet ministers and representatives of the Trust serving as members.

Construction of the institute began in the mid-1970s. According to Dr Ajit Nagpal, the institute's first director, Sheikh Abdullah proposed the project to address the need for specialised medical facilities in the Kashmir Valley and Its development received financial support from the central government under Prime Minister Indira Gandhi. In 1976, a group of 56 doctors from Jammu and Kashmir was sent to other parts of India for training in various medical specialities. Medical professionals from outside the region were also recruited.

In February 1979, the institution was declared a government hospital through Government Order No. 36-ME of 1979. It was formally inaugurated on 5 December 1982, initially providing outpatient services and 150 inpatient beds. The hospital began functioning in 1983.

on 19 August 1983, the Jammu and Kashmir legislature granted SKIMS deemed-university status through a legislative enactment. The institution admitted its first batch of postgraduate students in 1984. In 1986, the government declared SKIMS a government organisation for all purposes through Government Order No. GD(Adm)10 of 1986.

=== Later developments ===
In 1989, the Sher-i-Kashmir National Medical Institute Trust established Jhelum Valley Medical College (JVC) as a private institution at Bemina, Srinagar. In 1998, the Government of Jammu and Kashmir took over the college and remained it SKIMS Medical College. It functions under the semi-autonomous administration of the Sher-i-Kashmir Institute of Medical Sciences (SKIMS). As of 2026, the combined MBBS intake stands at 150 seats per year.

By July 2003, the state government had reportedly spent approximately ₹520 crore on the construction, development, equipment, and maintenance of the institute. The campus subsequently expanded to occupy roughly 1,000 kanals of land.

== Governance and administration ==
SKIMS operates as a semi-autonomous government institution under a special legislative framework. Its administration is overseen by a Governing Body. Historically, the Chief Minister of Jammu and Kashmir served as the chairperson of the Governing Body. In July 2022, the Government of Jammu and Kashmir reconstituted the body and designated the Lieutenant Governor of Jammu and Kashmir as its chairperson. The reconstituted body includes the Advisors to the Lieutenant Governor, the Chief Secretary of Jammu and Kashmir, the Union Health Secretary, the Secretary of the Department of Biotechnology in the Government of India, the Director of the AIIMS, and the principals of major government medical colleges in Jammu and Kashmir. The changes to the institute's administrative structure led to discussions about its autonomy and academic status. Medical professionals, former administrators, and political figures expressed differing views on these changes.

In June 2024, Mohammad Ashraf Ganie was appointed Director of SKIMS.

== Campus and facilities ==
The SKIMS campus is located at Soura in Srinagar and covers approximately over 1,000 kanals. It accommodates the main hospital, academic departments, research facilities, administrative and residential facilities.

The institution includes:

- SKIMS Hospital
- State Cancer Institute
- Maternity Hospital, located across the road to the east of the main SKIMS.
- Mader-e-Meharban Institute of Nursing Science and Research (MMINSR)
- College of Paramedical Sciences
- Research and academic departments

=== SKIMS Medical College, Bemina ===
SKIMS Medical College and Hospital is located in Bemina in Srinagar. It was established in 1989 as Jhelum Valley Medical College (JVC). The government took over the institution in 1998 and bought it under SKIMS. As of 2026, the combined MBBS intake stands at 150 seats per year.

=== Medical education and research ===
SKIMS functions as a deemed university and offers undergraduate, postgraduate and super-speciality programmes in medicine and related disciplines. Its courses include MBBS, MD, MS, DM, MCh and PhD programmes, as well as nursing and paramedical courses. In 1988, the institute established the Journal of Medical Sciences, which publishes research articles and other academic contributions in medical and related disciplines.

== Infrastructure ==
According to its 2023 Bio-Medical Waste Management Annual Report, SKIMS operates as a 1,015-bed government hospital. The report also documented the use of both in-house and common biomedical waste treatment facilities.

The institute has reported an increase in patient numbers over the years. in 2014, its authorities reported approximately 624,000 patients had attended is outpatient department during the year, while accident and emergency registrations stood at around 109,000.

== Notable medical achievements ==
In November 2025, a multidisciplinary team at SKIMS performed an 11-hour neurosurgical procedure to remove a rare holocord intramedullary spinal cord tumour from an 18-year-old patient. The operation involved a 17-level laminoplasty followed by tumour removal.

== See also ==
- Government Medical Colleges in Jammu and Kashmir
- 90 Feet Road
