= Government Medical College, Udhampur =

India, cultural and specific, educate medicine with regulation

- Motto: Education Treatment Research
- Type: Medical college and hospital
- Established: 2023; 3 years ago
- Affiliations: National Medical Commission
- Academic affiliations: University of Jammu
- Principal: Dr. Parmod Kalsotra
- Location: Udhampur, Jammu and Kashmir, India; 32.91962°N 75.13310°E
- Campus: Urban
- Website: gmcudhampur.in

Government Medical College, Udhampur (GMC Udhampur) is a tertiary referral Government Medical college in Udhampur, Jammu and Kashmir, India. It was established in the year 2023. The college is affiliated with the University of Jammu and is recognised by National Medical Commission. The hospital associated with the college is one of the largest hospitals in the Udhampur district. The selection to the college is done on the basis of merit through National Eligibility and Entrance Test. Yearly undergraduate student intake is 100 from the year 2023.

== Courses ==
Government Medical College, Udhampur undertakes education and training of MBBS courses. This college has been offering 100 MBBS seats since 2023.

== See also ==
- Government Medical Colleges in Jammu and Kashmir
