= Government Medical College, Anantnag =

Medical College in Anantnag, India

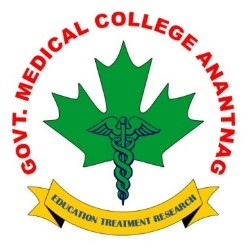
- Motto: Education Treatment Research
- Type: Medical college and hospital
- Established: 2019; 7 years ago
- Affiliations: National Medical Commission
- Academic affiliations: University of Kashmir
- Principal: Dr. Junaid S. Wani
- Location: Anantnag, J&K, India
- Campus: Rural
- Colors: Blue, green, & white
- Website: www.gmcanantnag.ac.in

Government Medical College, Anantnag (GMC Anantnag) is a tertiary referral Government Medical college in Anantnag, Jammu and Kashmir, India. It was established in the year 2019. The college is affiliated with University of Kashmir and is recognized by National Medical Commission. The hospital associated with the college is one of the largest hospitals in the Anantnag. The selection to the college is done on the basis of merit through National Eligibility and Entrance Test. As of 2026, yearly undergraduate student intake is for 150 seats. It is associated with the District Hospital Anantnag, (MMABH). It was the first medical college out of Srinagar district which got permission for RT-PCR testing. A vaccination program (Co-Win) is underway. The college published its first magazine, MEDCOLANG, in June 2021. First time in J&K; KASOCON 2022-North Zone Conference of Indian Association of Surgical Oncology (IASO) was held at GMC Anantnag on 13 and 14 May 2022.

== Courses ==
Government Medical College, Anantnag undertakes education and training of MBBS courses. This college has been offering 150 MBBS seats of which 15% are filled by MCC for AIQ, rest 85% are filled by JKBOPEE as state quota. Nursing and Paramedical courses are also offered, whose admission test is conducted by JKBOPEE. GMC Anantnag offers DNB courses in several clinical and non-clinical specialties, which are filled using NEET-PG score by MCC, currently GMC Anantnag has got approval for 32 DNB seats from NBE.

== See also ==
- Government Medical Colleges in Jammu and Kashmir
