= Government Medical College, Kathua =

Medical college in Jammu & Kashmir

- Type: Medical College and Hospital
- Established: 2019; 7 years ago
- Affiliations: National Medical Commission
- Academic affiliations: University of Jammu
- Principal: Dr. Surinder Kumar Atri
- Location: Kathua, Jammu and Kashmir, India
- Website: http://gmckathua.in/

Government Medical College, Kathua is a full-fledged tertiary referral Government Medical college. It was established in the year 2019. This college imparts the degree Bachelor of Medicine and Surgery (MBBS). The college is affiliated to University of Jammu and is recognized by National Medical Commission. The hospital associated with the college is one of the largest hospitals in the Kathua. The selection to the college is done on the basis of merit through National Eligibility and Entrance Test. Yearly undergraduate student intake is 150.

== Courses ==
GMC Kathua undertakes education and training of students MBBS courses.

== See also ==
- Government Medical Colleges in Jammu and Kashmir
- List of hospitals in India
