= Government Medical College, Doda =

Medical college in Kashmir, India

Government Medical College, Doda (گورنمنٹ میڈیکل کالج ڈوڈا)
- Other name: Chenab Valley Medical College (سرکآرؠ طِبہ ژاٹٔھل ڈۄوڈہ)
- Type: Medical College and Hospital
- Established: 2020; 6 years ago
- Affiliations: National Medical Commission
- Academic affiliations: University of Jammu
- Principal: Dr. Dev Raj Dogra
- Undergraduates: 150 per year
- Location: Doda, Jammu and Kashmir, India
- Website: Official website

Government Medical College, (Koshur; سرکآرؠ طِبہ ژاٹٔھل ڈۄوڈہ) established in 2020, is a full-fledged tertiary referral Government Medical college. This college offers the degree Bachelor of Medicine and Surgery (MBBS). The college is affiliated to University of Jammu and is recognised by National Medical Commission. This is one of the largest hospitals in the Doda. The selection to the college is done on the basis of merit through National Eligibility Entrance Test. As of 2026, the combined MBBS intake stands at 150 seats per year.

== Courses ==
GMC Doda undertakes education and training of students in undergraduate MBBS course and post graduation DNB course.

== See also ==
- Government Medical Colleges in Jammu and Kashmir
- List of hospitals in India
