= Government Medical College, Jammu =

Medical college and hospital in Jammu, India

- Type: Medical college
- Established: 1973; 53 years ago
- Affiliations: National Medical Commission
- Academic affiliations: University of Jammu
- Principal: Dr. Ashutosh Gupta
- Location: Bakshi Nagar, Jammu, Jammu and Kashmir, India
- Campus: Urban
- Website: gmcjammu.nic.in

The Government Medical College, Jammu (also known as GMC Jammu) is a medical college located in Jammu, Jammu and Kashmir, India. It was established in 1973. The college and hospital are approved and recognized by the National Medical Commission since the year of inception of college. As of 2026, the combined MBBS intake stands at 250 seats per year.

== Degree ==
GMC Jammu offers training courses and degrees in various disciplines like MBBS, BSC Paramedical courses, Post graduation, Physiotherapy, Anticillary Medical Training (AMT) etc.

== Associated Hospitals ==
There are currently 08 associated hospitals with GMC, Jammu

- Medical College Hospital
- SMGS Hospital
- Chest Disease Hospital
- Psychiatry Disease Hospital
- Super Speciality Hospital
- Bone and Joint Hospital
- Maternity Hospital (MCH Gandhi Nagar)
- State Cancer Institute

== See also ==
- Government Medical Colleges in Jammu and Kashmir
