= Jawahar Nagar, Srinagar =

Jawahar Nagar
- Location in Jammu and Kashmir, India Jawahar Nagar (India)
- Coordinates: 34.05°N 74.81°E
- Country: India
- Union territory: Jammu and Kashmir
- District: Srinagar

Government
  - Type: Democracy
  - Body: Government of Jammu and Kashmir
- Elevation: 1,592 m (5,223 ft)

Languages
  - Official: Kashmiri, Urdu, Hindi, Dogri, English
- Time zone: UTC+5:30 (IST)
- PIN: 190008
- Vehicle registration: JK01

Jawahar Nagar is the notified area in the municipal committee of Srinagar, in the Indian administered union territory of Jammu and Kashmir. It comes under the Amira Kadal Constituency. Jawahar Nagar is a posh locality in the civil line area of Srinagar. The postal code of Jawahar Nagar is 190008. Jawahar Nagar is considered one of the many best residential places in Srinagar. The airport is located at a distance of 9.3 km (5.8 mi). Jawahar Nagar area was heavily damaged by the 2014 Kashmir floods, it was one of the worst affected areas due to flood. There are two Branches of Jammu and Kashmir Bank, one of which is exclusively for women. There are multiple gymnasiums, mosques and shops in the area.

== Geography ==
Jawahar Nagar is situated along the river banks of Jehlum River. Gogji Bagh, Wazir Bagh, Rajbagh, Lal Chowk are the nearby localities. The area is located at an RL of 1592 metres above mean sea level in Mumbai.

Jawahar Nagar is a well developed area with wide roads and abundance of parks. Houses are built on equal sized plots. Jawahar Nagar and Karan Nagar are the only two localities which come under direct control of the government and hence everything is in a planned manner. The area consists of Government Quarters, Municipal Park, DAV School.

== September floods ==
The area was damaged quite heavily by the 2014 Kashmir floods. At about 4:18 am on 7 September water started to enter the ground floors of the houses located in this locality & by 3 pm the water level had reached about 25 feet high above ground level on the streets. Some houses were fully submerged in water, others were partially submerged, people were rescued from their houses by locals in shikaras & rafting boats. The water finally vanished in Jawahar Nagar after 25 days. Jawahar Nagar was submerged under water for 25 days after the flood came. The damage level was quite high in the Jawahar Nagar area. It was one of the worst affected areas during the flood. A lot of houses got damaged in the floods.

== Schools ==
1. Government Boys Higher Secondary School 2. Model High School

== Gymnasiums ==
1. Hybrid Fitness
2. Heavy Duty Health Club
3. Anytime Fitness

== See also ==
- Lal Bazar
- Rajbagh
- Lal Chowk
- Soura
- Karan Nagar
- Indira Nagar, Srinagar
- Ichgam
