= Tyndale Biscoe School =

Missionary school in Jammu and Kashmir, India

Tyndale Biscoe School (TBS)
- Tyndale Biscoe School Motto

Location
- Sheikh Bagh, Lal Chowk, Srinagar, Jammu & Kashmir; Srinagar; 34.071402°N 74.812234°E

Information
- Former name: Hadow Public School
- Type: Private School
- Motto: In All Things Be Men
- Established: 1880; 146 years ago
- Founder: Rev. James Hinton Knowles
- Sister school: 1. Mallinson Girls School; 2. The Kashmir Valley School; 3. Tyndale Biscoe & Mallinson School, Tangmarg
- Educational authority: Tyndale Biscoe and Mallinson Society, Srinagar, Diocese of Amritsar, Church of North India (CNI)
- Principal: Mabel Yonzon
- Gender: Boys
- Language: English
- Campus: Urban
- Area: 84 kanals (including the Mallinson Girls School)
- Houses: Kolahoi; Harmukh; Tatakuti; Mahadev
- Sports: Football, basketball, cricket, hockey, water polo, swimming, volleyball, badminton, etc.
- Nickname: Biscoits, Biscoe Boys
- Affiliation: Jammu and Kashmir State Board of School Education
- Website: tbmes.org

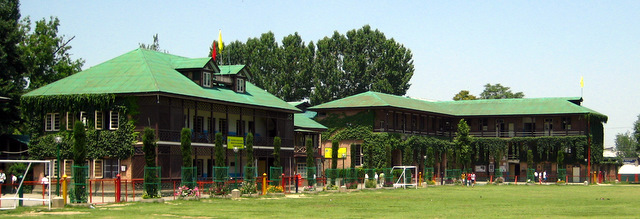
Tyndale Biscoe School

Tyndale Biscoe School is a school in the Sheikh Bagh neighbourhood, in the Lal Chowk area of Srinagar, Jammu and Kashmir, India. The school was founded in 1880 CE and is one of the oldest schools in Jammu and Kashmir, the oldest being S.P. Higher Secondary School which was founded in 1874 CE. The school was started by Christian missionaries and was named after Canon Cecil Tyndale-Biscoe (1863–1949). It still has affiliations with the Church Mission Society. The first principal was Reverend J. H. Knowles.

== Departments ==
The school has five departments.

Department	Classes
Lower Primary Department	Nursery to II
Junior Department	III to V
Middle Department	VI to VIII
Senior Department	IX and X
Higher Secondary (Science Stream only)	XI and XII

== Activities ==
Tyndale Biscoe School is known for its extra-curricular activities, especially swimming, skiing, mountain climbing, camping and regatta. School placed emphasis on physical activities including mountaineering, trekking, boating, football, cricket, and swimming stimulating sense of courage, masculinity and physical fitness.

When football was introduced in the Valley by Missionary School, there was resistance initially. Students felt the cow leather was holy and touching the ball, made out of it, was blasphemous. Instead they played football with a wooden clog (known as Khraav in Kashmiri) in their feet. Similarly, when boating was introduced in Mission School students did not like boating because, in Kashmiri society, boatmen weren't consider respectable members of the society. But later it was adopted and the Mission School boys became efficient paddlers and rowers.

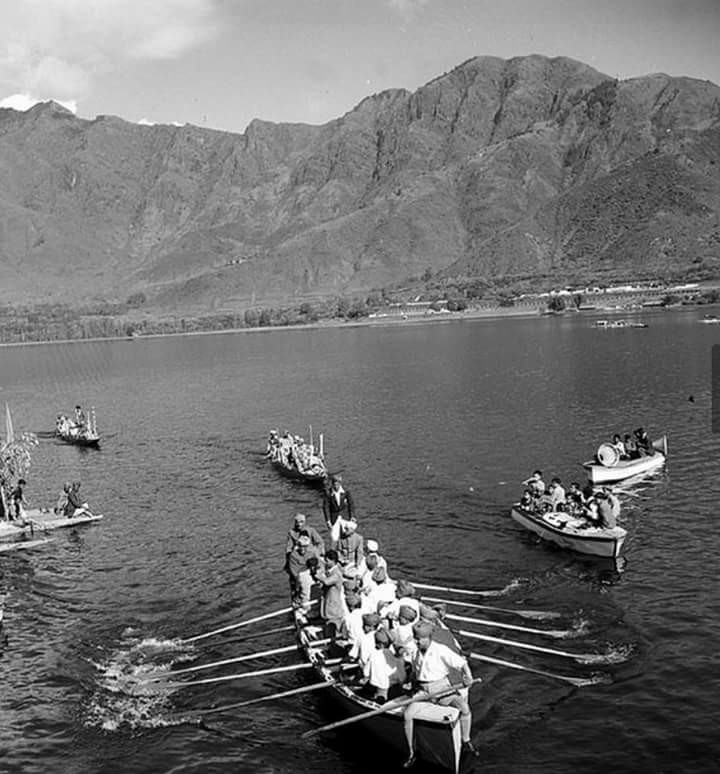
Regatta organised by Tyndale Biscoe School in May 1948

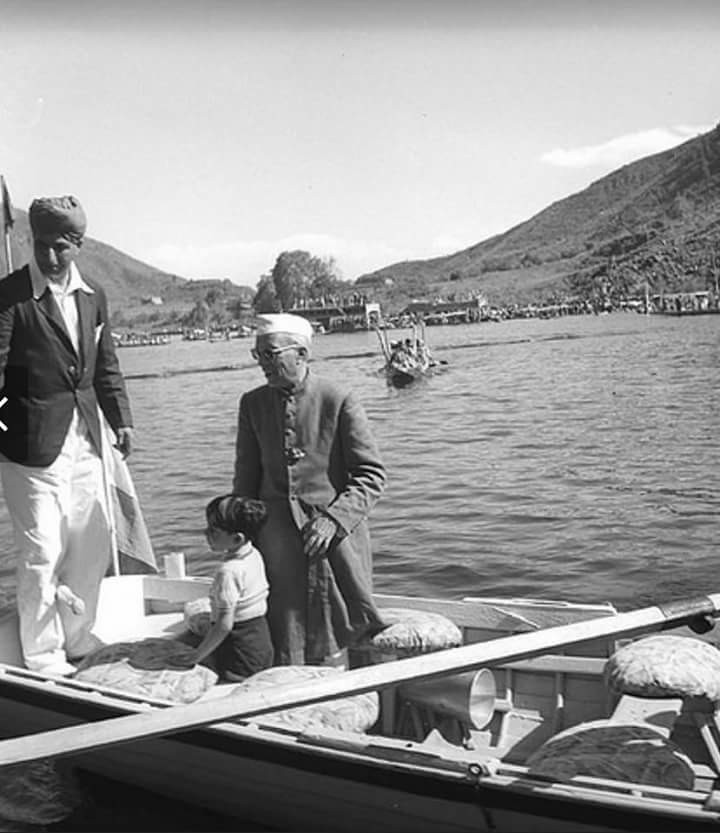
India's first Prime Minister visited Regatta held by Tyndale Biscoe School in May 1948 during his Kashmir Visit

== History ==
Rev. J.H. Knowles, in 1880, laid the foundation of the C.M.S. (Church Mission Society) School on the hospital premises (Modern Chest Disease Hospital, Drugjan) in Srinagar. The school was started with 5 pupils. In 1883, the number of boys in the school increased to 30.

In 1890, the Government permitted the C.M.S. to shift the school to downtown, and it was moved from the hospital premises (Drugjan) to a large house and compound on the river bank in the middle of the city at Fateh Kadal. As a result of this, the number of students increased to about 200 in 1890. Canon C.E. Tyndale-Biscoe joined the school in 1891, there were 250 pupils on the school roll. The primary school grew into a middle school and eventually into a high school. The high school was designated the Hadow Memorial School after the name of its honorary treasurer for 40 years. Eventually, five other mission schools were set up, one each in different parts of the capital city and one in Anantnag.

== Notable alumni ==
- Farooq Abdullah – (born 1937) politician and former Chief Minister of Jammu and Kashmir
- Aga Syed Ruhullah Mehdi - (born 1976) politician and Member of parliament
- Ishfaq Ahmed – (born 1983), a professional footballer and the head coach of I-League club Real Kashmir
- Agha Shaukat Ali – (1920–2013) Kashmiri civil servant turned Pakistani politician after partition
- Imran Raza Ansari – (born 1972) politician and religious scholar
- Dr. Anil Bhan – a cardiologist at Medanta who performed the first successful heart transplant in India. He was awarded the certificate of Honor as "Best All Round Boy" in school
- Masarat Alam Bhat – (born 1971), Kashmiri separatist leader, chairman of the Jammu Kashmir Muslim League and also serving as chairman of the Hurriyat Conference
- Thupstan Chhewang (born 1947), Indian politician
- Durga Prasad Dhar – (1918–1975), Kashmiri politician and an Indian diplomat
- P. N. Dhar (1919–2012), economist and the head of Indira Gandhi's secretariat
- Khurshid Drabu CBE (1946–2018), English judge, law lecturer and Muslim community leader; first Muslim to be a judge in Britain
- Shah Faesal – (born 1983), IAS civil servant, social activist, politician
- Bhagwan Gopinath – (1898 – 1968), born Gopinath Bhan, was a mystic saint of early 20th century Kashmir
- Eliezer Joldan – (1916-2001), an educationist who was the first trained graduate to profess teaching as a profession in Ladakh
- Iqbal Khan – (born 1981) is a Bollywood actor
- Bakshi Ghulam Mohammad – (1907–1972), politician and former Prime Minister of Jammu and Kashmir
- Mohammad Shafi Qureshi (1929–2016), advocate, Indian politician and statesman from Kashmir, founder of the Congress Party in Jammu and Kashmir
- S. L. Sadhu – (1917-2012), a UNESCO award winning Kashmiri writer
- Tanvir Sadiq, Chief Spokesperson of Jammu and Kashmir National Conference
- Ashfaq Majeed Wani – (1966–1990), first commander-in-chief of Jammu Kashmir Liberation Front
