= Sonwar Bagh =

- Location in Jammu and Kashmir, India Sonwar Bagh (India)
- Coordinates: 34°4′17″N 74°50′39″E
- Country: India
- Union territory: Jammu and Kashmir
- Division: Kashmir
- District: Srinagar
- Settled: Ancient

Government
  - MLA: Mohammad Ashraf Mir
  - Member of Parliament: Farooq Abdullah
- Elevation: 1,559.5 m (5,116 ft)

Languages
  - Official: Kashmiri, Urdu, Hindi, Dogri, English
- Time zone: UTC+5:30 (IST)
- PIN: 190001 and 190004

Sonwar Bagh, sometimes referred to as Sonwar, is a residential area in the Badami Bagh Cantonment region on the outskirts of Srinagar city, in the Indian union territory of Jammu and Kashmir. It is gradually becoming more commercial, as many schools, hotels and restaurants have been established there.

It is home to many politicians like the ex-Chief Minister, Omar Abdullah who became the 11th, and youngest, Chief Minister of the Indian Administered state Jammu and Kashmir.

Sonwar Bagh was one of the worst affected areas from the 2014 India–Pakistan floods in Jammu and Kashmir. It is surrounded by Takht-i-Sulaiman Hill on top of which is Shankaracharya Temple

== Location ==
Sonwar Bagh lies parallel to the Jhelum River and National Highway road near Sonwar Bazaar (market). It is about 3–5 km (1.9–3.1 mi) from Lal Chowk, the commercial hub of the union territory of Jammu and Kashmir.

== Languages ==
The official language of this area is Urdu. English, Hindi and Kashmiri languages are also spoken.

== Subdivisions ==
Due to its large area it is divided into the following subdivisions:

- Iqbal Colony
- Indira Nagar
- Hamza Colony
- Old Sonwar Mohalla
- Palpora
- Banumsora
- Gupkar Road

== Schools ==
There are more than ten schools in Sonwar Bagh, including:

- Burn Hall School
- Woodlands House School
- Saint Paul's School
- Rosewood School
- Government Girls Higher Secondary
- Cadgy middle school

== 2014 Kashmir floods ==
Sonwar Bagh was one of many areas of Srinagar, including Shivpora, Jawahar Nagar, Rajbagh, Gogji Bagh, Pandrathan, and Batwara, that was worst hit by the 2014 Kashmir floods. Sonwar Bagh was completely submerged for 21 days. Many houses were destroyed and damaged, but only a few people were killed. The water started to enter Sonwar Bagh at about 4:00 am because of a breach in Jhelum River bund. In a few hours it reached a level of more than one and a half storeys.

== Features ==
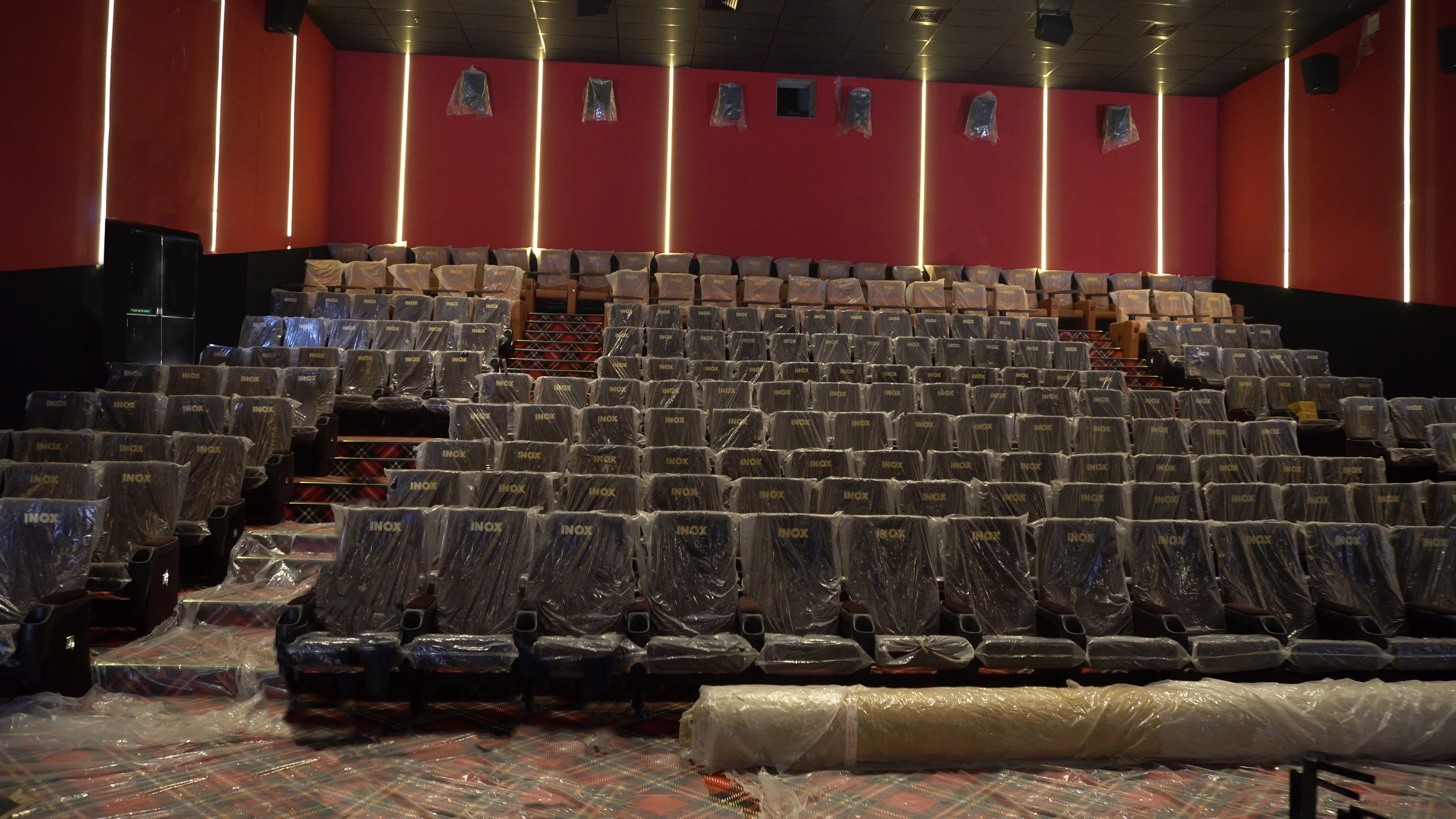
One of the three halls of Inox Multiplex Srinagar. The cinema will be thrown open for general people in the September 2022.

The main pincodes of this area include 190001 and 190004.

=== Hospitals ===
GP Panth Hospital, Kashmir's only children's hospital, is situated in Sonwar Bagh.

=== Hotels ===
There are many hotels in Sonwar Bagh. The most famous of them are:

- Hotel Four Points
- Hotel International
- Hotel Akbar Residency

=== Cinemas ===
- INOX multiplex at Shivpora in Sonwar near Badami Bagh Cantonment is situated. Earlier Broadway Cinema was situated at the same site.

=== Restaurants and cafes ===
- Krishna Dhaba
- Cafe Coffee Day
- Seasons Restaurant
- Bites
- Go Chatzz
