= Indira Nagar, Srinagar =

- Neighbourhood
- Location in Srinagar, Jammu and Kashmir, India
- Coordinates: 34°4′16.56″N 74°50′38.27″E
- Country: India
- Union territory: Jammu and Kashmir
- District: Srinagar
- Settled: Ancient

Government
  - Type: Democracy
  - Body: Government of Jammu and Kashmir
  - MLA: Mohammad Ashraf Mir
  - Member of Parliament: Farooq Abdullah
- Elevation: 1,559.5 m (5,116 ft)

Languages
  - Official: Kashmiri, Urdu, Hindi, Dogri, English
- Time zone: UTC+5:30 (IST)
- PIN: 190004
- Telephone code: 0194
- Vehicle registration: JK01

Indira Nagar is a residential area in the city of Srinagar in the Indian union territory of Jammu and Kashmir. It used to be a lake before but now only a few hundred meters of the lake are left.

This area comes under the control of Badami Bagh Cantonment along with other areas like Batwara, Shivpora, and Sonwar Bagh. The cantonment is responsible for maintaining the roads, street lights, and other infrastructure, unlike other areas of Srinagar, which are maintained by the Srinagar Municipal Corporation.

Kashmiri Pandits, Muslims, Sikhs, and Hindus live in the area.

Over the years, this area has been commercialised by the construction of many hotels. It is located about 4 kilometres (2.5 miles) from the commercial hub of Kashmir, Lal Chowk. Indira Nagar is near G.B. Pant Children's Hospital. The pincode is 190004.

This area falls under the Sonwar constituency, for which the MLA is Mohammad Ashraf Mir.

== 2014 Kashmir Flood ==
Indira Nagar was one of many areas of Srinagar, including Shivpora, Jawahar Nagar, Rajbagh, Gogji Bagh, Pandrathan, and Batwara, that were among the worst hit by the 2014 Kashmir floods. Indira Nagar was completely submerged for more than 30 days. Many houses were damaged or destroyed due to the floods, but only a few people were killed. The water started to enter Indira Nagar at about 4:00 am because of a breach in the Jhelum River bund. It took just a few hours to reach for the water level to rise and fill more than one and a half storeys. After the floods, people returned to their homes, began cleaning up, and resumed their routines, though life remained difficult.

== Features ==
Hotels

- Hotel The Grand Plaza
- Hotel Indra
- Hotel Hill View
- Hotel Mountain View
- Hotel Rash Residency
- Hotel Akbar Inn
- Hotel Rotana
- Hotel Gulfam
- Hotel Muskaan
- Hotel Silverine
- Hotel Ground Plaza
- Hotel Fortune Inn
- Heritage Studio Boutique guest House

== See also ==
- Sonwar Bagh
- Lal Chowk
- Badami Bagh
