= George Naz blasphemy case =

George
- جارج
- Born: George
- Known for: Charge of blasphemy

George Naz (جارج ناز) is a Pakistani Christian who led the protest against the Badami Bagh arson in Jhelum in March 2013, was charged under the anti-blasphemy law. Naz, an employee of the District Municipal Administration, Jhelum as well a known Christian local leader led the protest against the misuse of the blasphemy laws. A banner which read: "Blasphemy law is back law and a hanging sword on Christians" became the bone of contention. On 21 March 2013, a First information report was registered against him at the local police station in Jhelum City. He was rescued by Farrukh Saif Foundation and their partner Keith Davies in 2014. United Nations High Commissioner for Refugees granted him refugee status in 2017.
