= Little Angels High School, Srinagar =

Little Angels High School
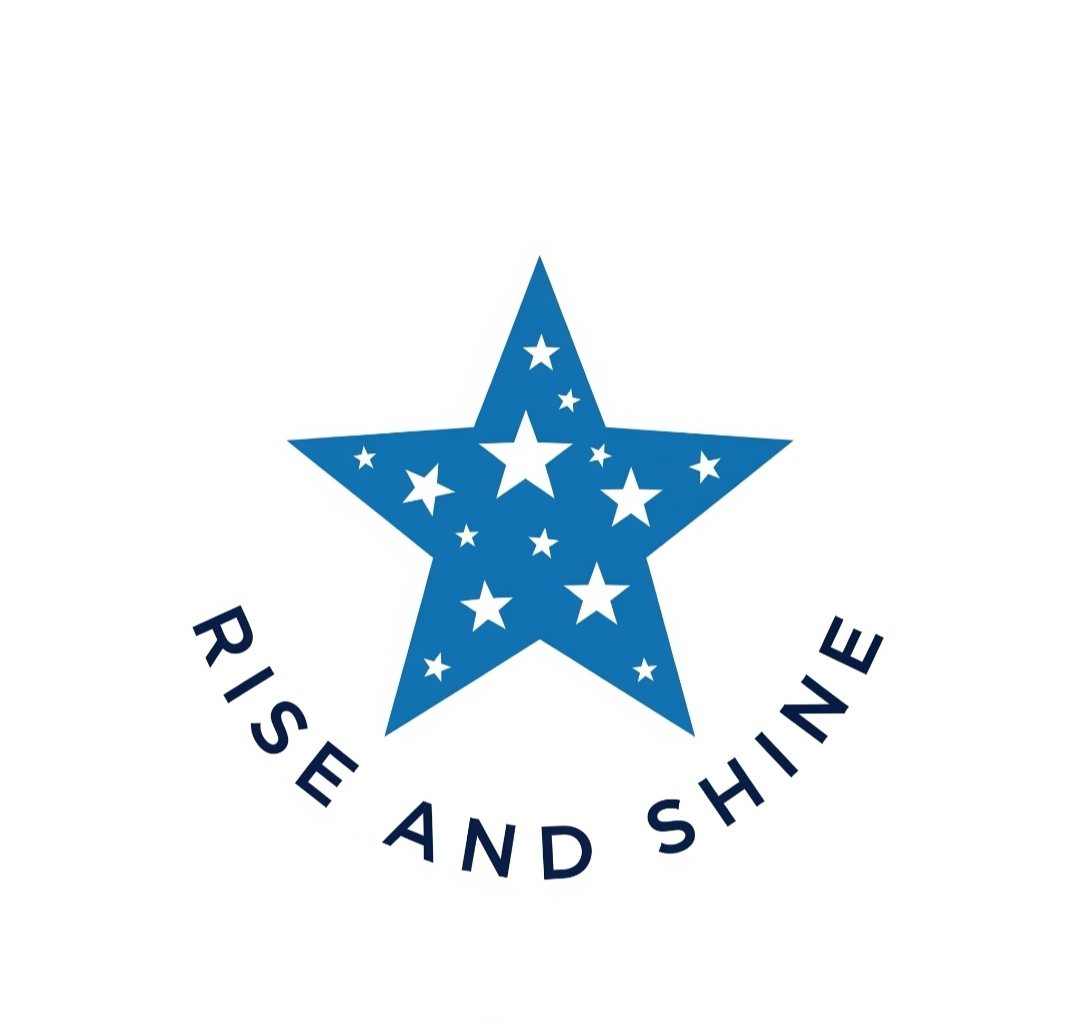
- Little Angels School Motto

Location
- Raj Bagh, Srinagar, Jammu & Kashmir; India; 34.0674°N 74.8242°E

Information
- Type: Private school
- Motto: Rise and Shine
- Established: 1992; 34 years ago Originally 1986 (Kindergarten school); 40 years ago
- Founder: Amjad Agha
- School district: Srinagar
- Principal: Faisal Agha
- Faculty: Full time
- Grades: Nursery to 10th
- Gender: Co-educational
- Campus: Urban
- Colors: White, Blue ⬜ 🟦
- Affiliations: JKBOSE
- Website: www.lahsrajbagh.com

Little Angels High School is a private, co-educational secondary school located in the Rajbagh area of Srinagar, Jammu and Kashmir, union territory of India. Established originally as a kindergarten in 1986 by founder Amjad Agha, it expanded into a full secondary school in 1992, offering education up to the matriculation level. The school is academically affiliated with the Jammu and Kashmir Board of School Education (JKBOSE)..

== History ==
Little Angels High School was established in 1986 as a kindergarten by Amjad Agha. In 1992, it expanded into a secondary school offering education up to Grade 10. The institution is affiliated with the Jammu and Kashmir State Board of School Education and is located in the Rajbagh area of Srinagar..

== Administration and Student Structure ==
The school is currently managed under the administrative direction of its founding Chairman, Amjad Agha, alongside Principal Faisal Agha. Serving co-educational classes from Nursery to the 10th Grade, the pedagogical layout is divided into four structural brackets: Lower Primary (Nursery to Grade II), Junior (Grades III to V), Middle (Grades VI to VIII), and Senior (Grades IX and X).

To foster competitive engagement, the student body is organized into a four-tier house system—designated as Red, Blue, Green, and Yellow houses—which governs both internal athletic matches and academic debate groups.

== Academics ==
Little Angels High School follows the curriculum prescribed by the Jammu and Kashmir State Board of School Education (JKBOSE). English serves as the primary medium of instruction across all grades. The school places a strong emphasis on spoken English, with a policy requiring all students to communicate in English while on the school campus.

== Extracurricular activities ==
Little Angels High School incorporates a variety of extracurricular activities alongside its core curriculum, including annual cross-country runs, summer trekking expeditions for senior classes, and inter-house sports tournaments. Students regularly participate in regional inter-school seminars, art exhibitions, and sketching competitions conducted across district forums, and in sports such as cricket, football, and badminton.

== Campus and facilities ==
The school operates within an urban campus layout in the Rajbagh locality, featuring a permanent pucca boundary wall for student security and a multi-room instructional layout. The main academic building houses 15 designated classrooms configured for an average class strength of 40 students.

The infrastructure incorporates the following resources:

- **Library:** A resource room housing a collection of approximately 3,000 reference books, text guides, and periodicals for student use.
- **Computer Laboratory:** A dedicated information technology lab equipped with 20 computer terminals to provide foundational digital literacy.

== Publications ==
The institution focuses on student-led journalism through its annual publication, the Bud Magazine, which has been printed as an internal school yearbook since 2017. The magazine compiles literary contributions, poetry, and artwork from the student body. Significant sections are traditionally dedicated to reflections from the annually elected Head Boy and Head Girl, documenting the school's structural milestones, administrative reports, and athletic achievements over the academic term.
