= James Hinton Knowles =

British Missionary in 19th century

James Hinton Knowles, Rev
- Occupations: Missionary, Author
- Notable work: A Dictionary Of Kashmiri Proverbs And Sayings (1888); Folk-Tales Of Kashmir (1893);

James Hinton Knowles (1856–1943) was a British missionary to Kashmir in the 19th century. He had visited Kashmir in the 1880s and authored two important books about Kashmiri language and culture. He was the first principal of the Tyndale Biscoe School Kashmir from 1876 to 1880. He was succeeded by Reverend F.E.Lucey A.M.

== Published works ==
=== A Dictionary Of Kashmiri Proverbs And Sayings ===
A Dictionary Of Kashmiri Proverbs And Sayings is a detailed collection of Kashmiri proverbs and sayings. It was published in 1888 in Bombay, British India.

=== Folk-Tales Of Kashmir ===
Folk-Tales Of Kashmir was published in 1893 in London. The book contains 40 fables and about 100 odd folk tales.

== See also ==
- Cecil Tyndale-Biscoe
- Walter Roper Lawrence
