= Mehvish Mushtaq =

Indian app developer

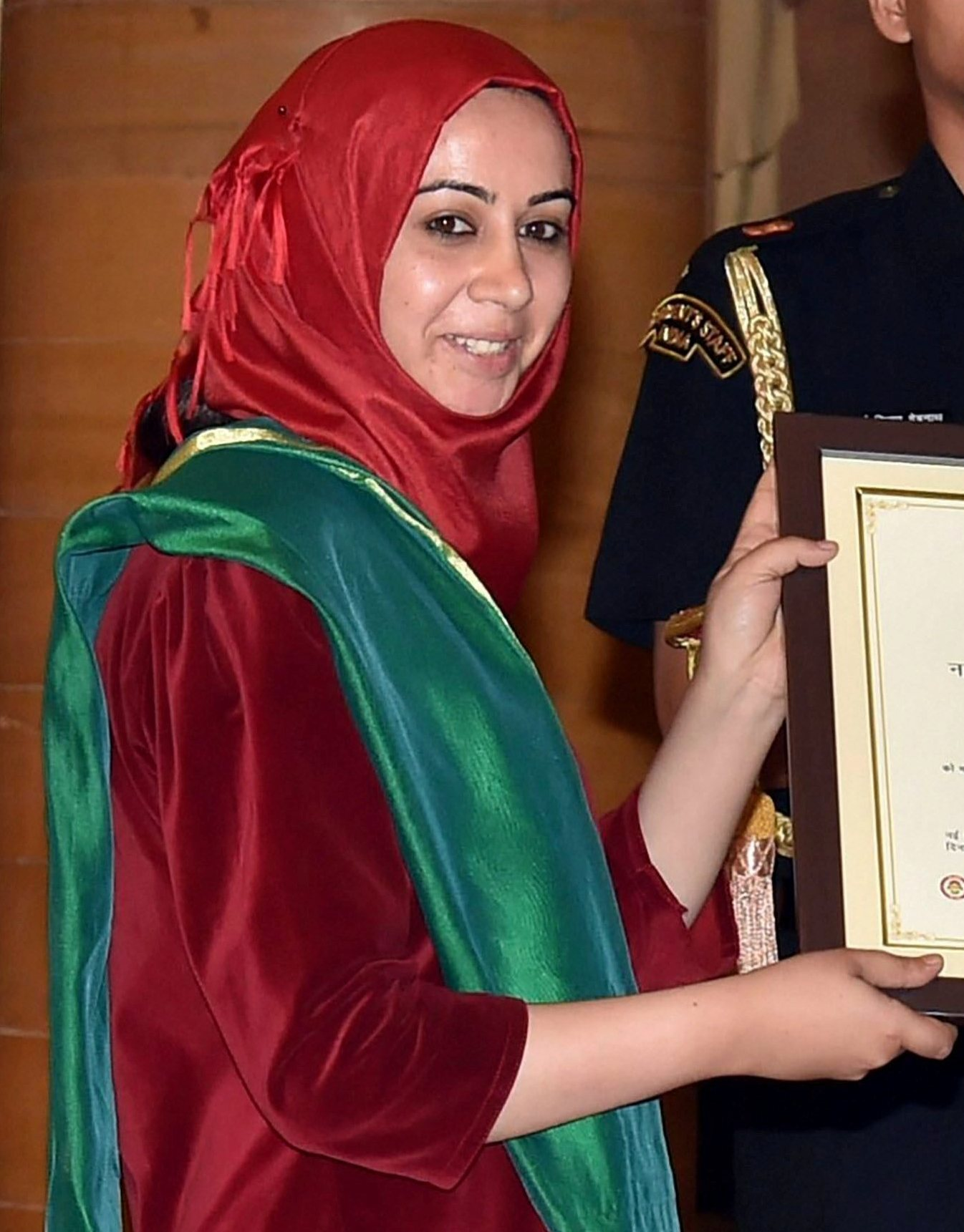
- Mehvish being awarded the Nari Shakti Puraskar by the President of India.
- Born: 1989 (age 36–37); Srinagar, Jammu and Kashmir
- Education: Presentation Convent Higher Secondary School; SSM College of Engineering and Technology
- Occupations: Entrepreneur, App developer
- Known for: Android software development
- Notable work: App "Dial Kashmir"
- Website: www.mehviish.com

Mehvish Mushtaq Hakak (Urdu: مہوش مشتاق) (born 1989) is an application and software developer, who created a business directory app for Kashmir called "Dial Kashmir", in 2013, for the Kashmir Valley, which made her the first Kashmiri female to develop an Android app.

== Biography ==
Born in 1989 in Srinagar, Mehvish Mushtaq is a Kashmiri app developer. At age 23, she developed the 'Dial Kashmir' Android app after completing an Android app design course. Dial Kashmir caters specifically to the Kashmir region. It provides the user with extensive information like addresses, phone numbers and email addresses of various essential and commercial services in various sectors in Kashmir, including hospitals, education, transport, and police. It also includes train, holiday, and prayer schedules, among other features. In 2013, Ahmed Ali Fayaaz of The Hindu described it as a "treasure trove of information on automobile services, hotels, doctors, houseboats, NGOs, real estate, postal codes, and even Waazwaan, Kashmir’s party cuisine, with over a dozen mutton preparations."

As of 2021, the app had over 50,000 downloads from the Google Play Store and has a rating of 4.3, with over 1,700+ reviews.

== Education ==
Mushtaq attended Presentation Convent Girls School in Srinagar, and completed her secondary education at The Mallinson Girls School. She completed her BE from SSM College of Engineering and Technology.

== Awards ==
- Femina Women's Awards(Online Influencer) — 2014
- Space Communications Award — 2014
- ALL Grassroots Women Achievers Award — 2014
- The Sunday Standard Devi Awards Delhi — 2016
- Nari Shakti Puraskar - 2017
