= Barbar Shah =

Neighbourhood in Jammu and Kashmir, India

Coordinates: 34°04′39″N 74°48′34″E

Barbar Shah, also known as Barbarshun in the Kashmiri language, is a neighbourhood of Srinagar in Jammu and Kashmir, India. It is situated about 0.5 km from Lal Chowk.
