= Mehwish =

Mehwish is a feminine given name which may refer to:

== People ==
- Mehwish Hayat (born 1988), Pakistani actress
- Mehwish Khan (born 1990), Pakistani footballer
- Mehwish Sultana (born 1980), Pakistani politician

== Fictional characters ==
- Mehwish Akhtar, a main character in Meray Paas Tum Ho, a 2019 Pakistani TV series
- Mehwish Dilawar, in Kaisi Teri Khudgarzi, a 2022 Pakistani TV series
- Mehwish, in Bunty I Love You, a 2013-2014 Pakistani TV series

== See also ==
- Mehvish Mushtaq (born 1989), first Kashmiri woman to create an Android app
- Mahvash, Iranian singer, dancer, film actress and stage performer born Masoumeh Azizi Borujerdi (1920–1961)
