= Khurshid Drabu =

English judge

Khurshid Drabu Varrier CBE (8 March 1946 – 20 April 2018) was an English judge, law lecturer and Muslim community leader. He was the first Muslim to be a judge in Britain, serving on immigration and asylum tribunals.

== Early life ==
Drabu was born in Srinagar in Kashmir as Khurshid Hassan Drabu to Ghulam Nabi Drabu, a tax commissioner, and his wife Zarifa. He studied at Tyndale Biscoe School, then Sri Pratap College to complete a BA in Political Science. In 1969, he completed a law degree at Aligarh University. He played first-class cricket for the Jammu and Kashmir cricket team from 1963 to 1970 as an opening batsman.

== Career ==
In November 1971, he moved to England with £3 in his pocket and became a law lecturer. He was called to the bar in 1977. He served as an advocate in the high court in Kashmir between 1978 and 1980 before returning to England to specialise in immigration law.

In 1987, he became deputy director of the Immigration Advisory Service. In 1990, he became the first deputy legal director of the Commission for Racial Equality, a position he held until 1997. While at the Commission for Racial Equality, Drabu Varrier was in charge of reviewing the Race Relations Act 1976.

His judicial career started with serving as a magistrate for 12 years. He served for twelve years as president of the Mental Health Review Tribunal. In 1996, he was appointed to the immigration and asylum tribunal. He became vice president of the tribunal in 2000 and served there until 2007. He still heard cases after retirement in the upper-tier immigration tribunal. He was also a visiting lecturer at the University of Middlesex in the law department. He also served as an adviser to the Ministry of Defence starting in 2002, and encouraged Muslims to join the armed forces. Under his tenure, the number of Muslims serving in the armed forces increased from 25 to almost 800.

In the 2010 Birthday Honours, he was awarded a CBE.

== Non-profit activities ==
Khurshid helped found the Muslim Council of Britain and served as the organisation's legal adviser. In 2007, he helped found the Mosques and Imams National Advisory Board to promote interfaith dialogue and improving standards in mosque leadership, as well as to reconcile Sunni and Shia communities .

== Personal life ==
Drabu married Reefat in 1972. They had four children, daughters Aliya, Farrah and Zayba, and son Hamza. At the time of his death, he was living in Winchester.

Khurshid Drabu died on 20 April 2018.
