= Mallinson Girls School =

The Mallinson Girls School
- The Mallinson School Motto

Location
- Sheikh Bagh, Lal Chowk, Srinagar, Jammu & Kashmir; India; 34.0699719°N 74.8122353°E

Information
- Type: Christian Missionary
- Motto: "Faithful in the least"
- Established: 1912 CE
- Founder: Ms Fitze Mallinson
- Principal: Mabel Youzon
- Head of school: Rahul Rex Kaul
- Gender: Girls only
- Classes: Nursery-12th
- Campus: Urban
- Nickname: "Mallinsonites"
- Affiliation: JK BOSE
- Website: tbms.tbmes.org/MGS/home.aspx/

Mallinson Girls School is located in the heart of Srinagar, in the Kashmir Valley of Jammu and Kashmir, India. The school was founded by Ms Fitze Mallinson in 1912 at Fateh Kadal and later shifted to Sheikh Bagh in the Lal Chowk area of Srinagar.

== History ==
Mallinson Girls' School was founded in 1912 by Miss Violet B. Fitze as the Girls' Mission High School. Its name was later changed to Mallinson Girls' School in honour of Miss Mallinson, a missionary who served in the school from 1922–1961. The Mallinson Girls Srinagar was established at Fateh Kadal in 1912. The first woman matriculate of Kashmir, Begum Zaffar Ali began her career as a teacher in the Girls' Mission High School in 1925. Mehmooda Ali Shah, educationist and Padma Shri awardee, was an alumnus of the institution.
