= Presentation Convent Higher Secondary School =

Location
- Rajbagh; Srinagar, Jammu and Kashmir, 190006; India; 34.069167°N 74.822778°E

Information
- Other name: Conventees
- Type: Private school
- Motto: Virtue and labour
- Religious affiliation: Catholic/Christan
- Established: 1936
- Founders: Mother M. Peter Conway; Sr. M. Annunciatia; Sr. Xavier
- School board: Jammu and Kashmir State Board of School Education
- Principal: Sr. Jyoti Thomas
- Grades: LKG–12
- Gender: Girls
- Language: English
- Houses: Jyoti; Nirmal; Neeti; Shanti
- Yearbook: Qandeel
- Website: www.pchssrinagar.com

Presentation Convent Higher Secondary School is a selective K-12 independent day school for girls in Rajbagh, on the banks of Jhelum River, Srinagar. It was started in 1936 and run by the Sisters of the Blessed Virgin Mary, also known as Presentation Sisters. It was started to educate Dr. Karan Singh, then Crown Prince of the princely state of Jammu and Kashmir. It was started in 1936 by Mother Peter Conway, Mother Sacred Heart, Mother Annunciata, and Mother Xavier. The nuns travelled to Srinagar from Rawalpindi upon the request of the Maharaja Hari Singh.

== History ==
The school was founded by the venerable Nano Nagle in Cork, Ireland. The school was intended to educate the Crown Prince of Jammu and Kashmir, but grew to educate the local elite population as well as children of British bureaucrats settled in the valley of Jammu Kashmir.

The founding members of the school in Srinagar were Mother Peter Conway, Mother Annunciata, and Mother Sacred Heart. The nuns from Presentation Convent High School, Rawalpindi travelled to Kashmir via Uri, in a journey of three days, on the invitation of the Maharaja, Hari Singh. The Maharaja had requested the Bishop of Srinagar to invite the nuns to set up a school in Kashmir for the education of his only son and the Crown Prince, Dr. Karan Singh. The sisters rented a building on the banks of the Dal, and started their school on 17 March 1936, while the construction of the actual school was underway at Rajbagh, on the banks of River Jhelum. The Maharaja granted the school a number of endowments including the 12 acres of land on which the school is built. The cost of building the school was borne by the ruler. On 15 June 1939 the school building was officially inaugurated.

Presentation Convent celebrated its Platinum Jubilee in 2011 when the school was upgraded from a high school to a secondary school in the academic session 2009–2010.

The Nagle Block was inaugurated in 2009 and the Jubilee Block was started in 2011 to commemorate the Platinum Jubilee of the school.

== Curriculum ==
Presentation Convent School implements the Jammu and Kashmir State Board of School Education curriculum from Year 8 to Year 12. From kindergarten up to Year 7, the school implements its own curriculum based on the guidelines set out by the NCERT.

The school was affiliated with the National Board of Education in England until 1947, and all of the answer scripts were sent to England via ship for marking. In 1947, it adopted the Jammu and Kashmir Board of Education curriculum.

The school offers only science and maths subjects in Year 11 and 12.

== Co-curriculum ==
Presentation Convent offers many co-curricular sports, performing arts, art, music, and other activities. In the past, the school also held various swimming and equestrian competitions for its students.

The school hosts cross-country races, badminton, cricket, and football matches, and a plethora of plays and performances. The school also hosts the annual Inter-School Nano Nagle Debate, in which independent schools of Kashmir are invited to participate.

The school has several holiday programmes during the winter and summer holidays, where pupils participate in sports including martial arts, golf, and several winter sports.

During the summer, pupils from the school can attend golf lessons at the Royal Springs Golf Course, in Srinagar. The school also hosts winter camps in Gulmarg, where students can participate in winter sports such as skiing and snow boarding.

Pupils from the school have won gold and silver medals in international tournaments in wushu, kickboxing, taekwondo, and skiing.

== Houses ==
The school has a house system of four houses. These are:

- Jyoti – Red and represented by an oil lamp
- Nirmal – Blue and represented by a Calla Lily
- Neeti – Yellow and represented by a weight balance
- Shanti – Green and represented by a dove

== Notable alumni ==
Former pupils of the school are called Conventees.

The school has educated daughters of the most prominent members of Kashmiri society, such as members of the royal Dogra family, daughters and granddaughters of formers Prime Ministers and Chief Ministers.

- Dr. Karan Singh, former Crown Prince of Jammu and Kashmir and other members of the royal Dogra Dynasty.
- Mehbooba Mufti, former chief minister of the Jammu and Kashmir.
- Nilofer Khan, Vice Chancellor of University of Kashmir

== Controversies ==
In 2020, Dr. Riyaz Ahmad Daga filed a lawsuit against the school after the school denied admission to his ward. The litigant claimed that the school denying his daughter admission despite fulfilling requisite criteria was an outright display of elitism. The litigant further claimed non-deserving candidates secured admission and criticised the school for "anti-poor" behaviour.

In April 2021, an RTI inquiry was launched against the school when it was revealed the school paid only INR 12,000 (USD 162) in taxes annually, despite the property being worth over INR 4 billion.

== See also ==
- Nano Nagle
- Presentation Convent High School Rawalpindi
