= Sri Pratap Higher Secondary School =

Public school in Jammu and Kashmir

- MA Road, Kothi Bagh, Srinagar, Jammu and Kashmir

Information
- Type: Public
- Motto: Ad Athera Tendens
- Established: 1874; 152 years ago
- Founders: Maharaja Ranbir Singh; Sir Pratap Singh
- Principal: Aijaz Ahmad Reshi
- Gender: Boys only
- Language: English
- Campus: Urban
- Sports: Football, hockey, Cricket, Volleyball etc.
- Affiliation: Jammu and Kashmir State Board of School Education

Sri Pratap Higher Secondary is an all-boys school located at M.A. Road, Srinagar, India. It is one of the oldest school in Srinagar, locally known as S.P school. It was established in 1874 by the King of Jammu and Kashmir himself, Maharaja Ranbir Singh and is named after his successor Sri Pratap Singh. The school has risen from ranks starting as a middIe school then a high school after that becoming a higher secondary school and being elevated to the status of Model School by the state government. It is a selective school that offers admission on the basis of merit . The school has produced a line of distinguished alumni.

== History ==
The school was established in 1874. Ranbir Singh was the first Dogra ruler who took interest in the advancement of education in the State of Jammu and Kashmir. In 1874, two schools were opened in the twin cities of Jammu and Srinagar. The schools were named as Ranbir High School Jammu and Srinagar Middle School. The Srinagar Middle School taught primary subjects of Sanskrit and Persian, however not as a regular system. The subjects were taught in the same way as in Maktabs and Chat halls. There was a separate department of teaching Arabic to Muslim students. In 1883 there were 450 boys on its roll.

It was with the advent of the reign of Sri Pratap Singh of Jammu and Kashmir in 1885 AD that modern education in the State took shape. Dr. A.K. Mitra (Superintendent of Schools) known as the father of education in Kashmir, zealously worked for the upliftment of Kashmiris and raised the status of Srinagar Schools to a full-fledged Anglo Vernacular School, introducing English and imparting instructions according to Panjab University Curriculum. In 1891, the school was raised the status of Srinagar High School and was later on called Sri Pratap High School.

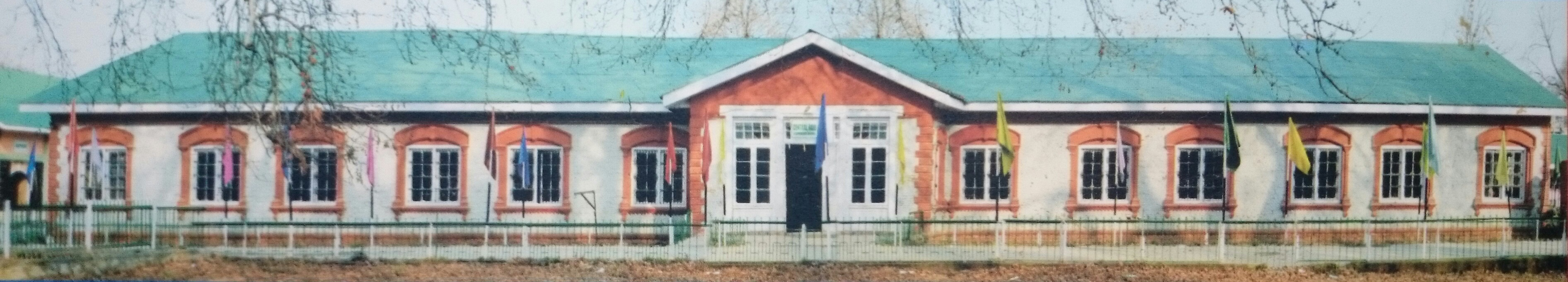
The Commerce Block

In 1912 AD S.P. School was reorganized and a postgraduate was appointed as the Head Master along with two trained graduates as teaching assistants. In 1913-1914 provision of teaching science and drawing subjects was introduced in the school. Later in 1921 Physical Education was introduced with accompaniment of music. In 1949-50 AD Mr. M.M. Kazim, the then Director School Education called a conference on social education and discussed the reorganisation of schools in Jammu & Kashmir state. On the recommendation of the conference, S.P. High School was elevated to S.P. Higher Secondary School as was affiliated to J&K University. At the same time crafts like wood carving, paper mache, embroidery, spinning and weaving were introduced in the school.

In 2015, the school was raised to the status of "Model School" by the State Government, Chief Minister, Mufti Mohammad Sayeed inaugurated the school as Model School on 14 September 2015.

== List Of Principal Of SP Higher Secondary School ==
No.	Name Of The Principal	Period of office		Length of term
1	M M Kazim	1 January 1969	6 May 1971	2 years, 125 days
2	Peerzada Gh Rasool	6 May 1971	3 August 1975	4 years, 89 days
3	Gh Ali Salmani	3 August 1975	12 August 1978	3 years, 9 days
4	Peerzada Gh Mohammad	12 August 1978	5 July 1982	3 years, 327 days
5	Ali Mohammad Mir	5 July 1982	8 February 1988	5 years, 218 days
6	Bansi Lal Labroo	8 February 1988	5 December 1989	1 year, 300 days
7	Muzaffar Ahmad	5 December 1989	4 December 1991	1 year, 364 days
8	Mohammad Siddiq Beigh	4 December 1991	2 February 1993	1 year, 60 days
9	Mohammad Asim Qadri	2 February 1993	14 July 1994	1 year, 162 days
10	Abdul Hamid Qadri	14 July 1994	8 September 1995	1 year, 25 days
11	Gh Rasool Wani	8 September 1995	5 May 2000	4 years, 240 days
12	Syed Qasim	5 May 2000	12 December 2002	2 years, 221 days
13	Irshad Anwar	12 December 2002	2 November 2006	3 years, 325 days
14	Gh Hussain Malik	2 November 2006	30 December 2007	1 year, 58 days
15	Abdul Khaliq Dar	1 January 2008	1 January 2011	3 years, 0 days
16	Bashir Ahmad Darzi	1 January 2011	5 May 2014	3 years, 124 days
17	Javaid Ahmad Darzi	5 May 2014	8 June 2015	1 year, 34 days
18	Riyaz Ahmad Darzi	8 June 2015	14 March 2016	280 days
19	Afifa Syed Qureshi	14 March 2016	8 March 2017	359 days
20	Riyaz Ahmad Siddiqi	8 March 2017	1 June 2021	4 years, 85 days
21	Nisar Ahmad Ahanger	1 June 2021	Incumbent	5 years, 150 days

== Location ==
The school is situated at M.A Road, Kothi Bagh, central area of Srinagar city in the capital of Jammu and Kashmir.

== Departments ==
The school has four departments. The activities of the departments are looked over by Heads Of Departments.

Departments
Humanities
Commerce
Science

== Houses ==
- Iqbal House
- Mehjoor House
- Shah-I-Hamdan House
- Sheikh Ul Alam House

== Laboratory ==
The school has laboratory facilities for Physics, Chemistry, Botany, Zoology, Biotechnology and Biochemistry.

== Smart class ==
The school has established two smart class rooms with internet connectivity where in students of all the classes and all streams get chance to learn once in a week according to a time schedule.

== Notable alumni ==
- Mufti Mohammad Sayeed
