= 1992 India–Pakistan floods =

Natural disaster in India and Pakistan

- Date: 7 September 1992 – unknown
- Location: Azad Kashmir, Punjab, Jammu and Kashmir, North-West Frontier Province
- Cause: Heavy rain Landslide; Severe weather
- Deaths: 2,496 total 2,000 – Azad Kashmir; 296 – Punjab(Pakistan); 200 – Jammu and Kashmir
- Property damage: $1 billion (estimated); 9.3 million affected 350,000 families went homeless 12,672 villages swept away 160,000 cattle drowned 80% bridges and roads destroyed 3.3 million evacuated

The 1992 India–Pakistan floods was a deadly flood caused by a five days long heavy monsoon rains and severe weather that occurred on 7 September 1992 across the north-Pakistan of Azad Kashmir, North-West Frontier Province and Indian administered state of Jammu and Kashmir. Severe floods left at least 2,496 fatalities, including 2,000 deaths in Pakistan administered state, 296 in Punjab province, and 200 in northern India with several others missing. The floods swept away more than 12,672 villages and several people were buried alive due to landslides near mountains. Punjab, that shares its borders with Azad Kashmir, suffered a heavy agriculture loss in its economic history.

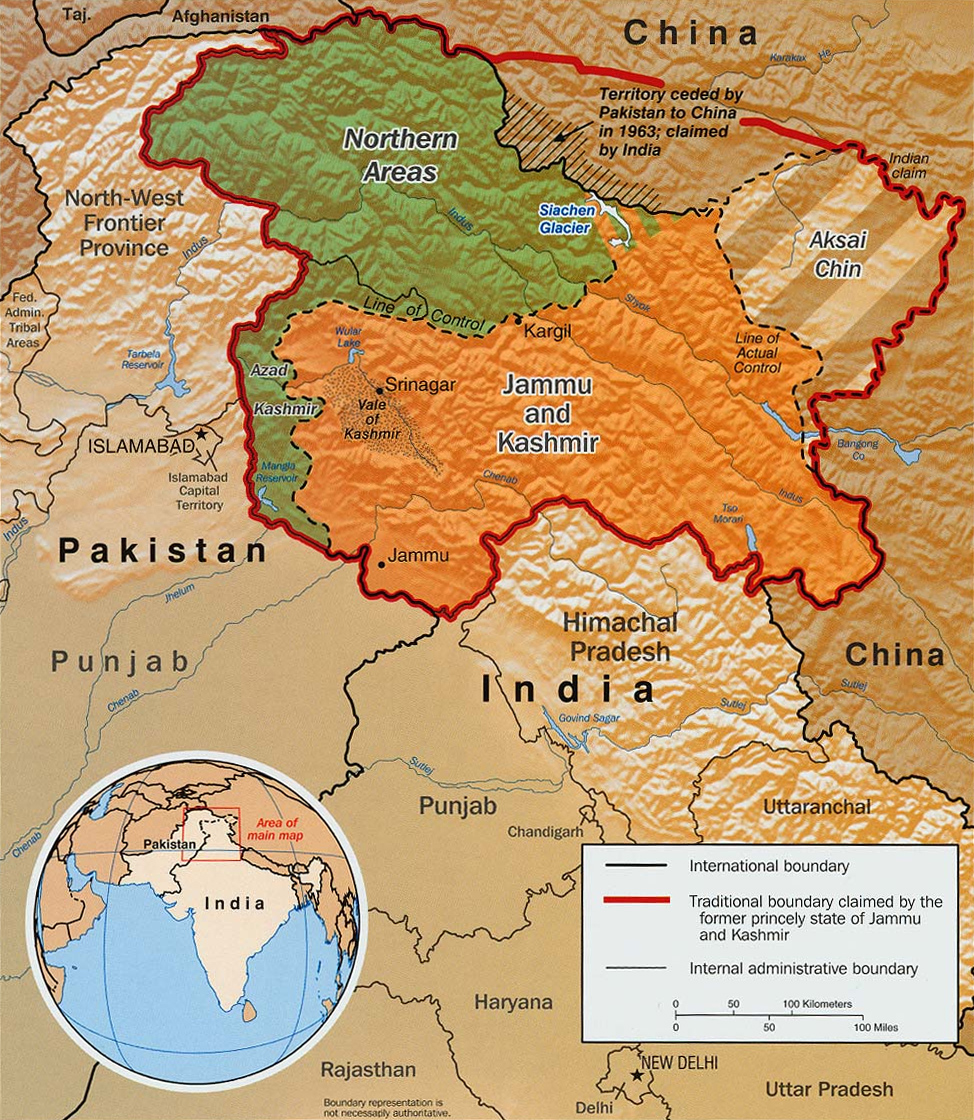
Map of Kashmir approx location of affected regions (Azad Kashmir shown in green while orange-brown represents Jammu and Kashmir)

The floods evacuated 3.3 million people from the affected areas. Initial reports cited between 900 and 1,000 dead with 1,000 missing.

== Background ==
The floods originated from the three major rivers such as Indus river, the longest river of the country, which flows through Pakistan, China and India, Chenab river, the major river of India and Pakistan, and the Jhelum river, a river in northern India and eastern Pakistan. The heavy rainfall in northern mountains made three rivers overflow. The Jhelum river swept away more than 400 people in Punjab province, including refugees along with shelters built of mud on the banks of the river. Pakistan suffered a heavy loss of 2,000 fatalities as well as millions of worth properties, while hundreds of people died in Indian-controlled Jammu and Kashmir.

== Emergency response ==
After floods struck Pakistan, mostly Azad Kashmir, the Government of Pakistan declared a nationwide emergency. The United Nations mobilized disaster management team to make necessary arrangements for dispatching disaster relief and to provide medical assistance to the flood victims of Pakistan. Pakistan also established the Prime Minister Relief Fund for 1992, a relief account designed to receive international funds as well as provincial-level relief contributions to combat the disaster. Government mobilized Pakistan army as well as local administration in an effort to recover missing people and to provide emergency services to the victims. The World Bank, a financial organization for government agencies, described the efforts of Pakistan "satisfactory" towards its swift recover of damage, although hundreds of people were confirmed dead.

== Aftermath ==
Severe floods left 2,500 people dead, including 296 from Punjab. More than 9.3 million people were affected, and 350,000 families rendered homeless, including refuge huts. A report by the Pakistani government stated that 12,672 villages in north Pakistan were washed away, 160,000 cattle drowned away, and 80% of bridges and roads were completely destroyed. It was declared a deadliest flood in the history of Pakistan, destroying an estimated $1 billion of property of that time.

== See also ==
- 2014 India–Pakistan floods
- India–Pakistan border
- International response to the 2005 Kashmir earthquake
- 2010 Pakistan floods
