= Eliezer Joldan =

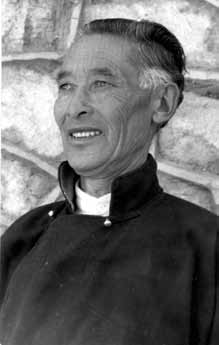
- Born: 25 August 1916; Leh
- Died: 23 June 2001 (aged 84); Leh
- Education: Punjab University, Lahore
- Occupation: Teacher
- Employer: Govt. of Jammu and Kashmir
- Known for: Being the first trained graduate teacher in Ladakh

Eliezer Joldan (1916-2001) was the first trained graduate to profess teaching as a profession in Ladakh. He was born in 1916 to Jonathan Tharchin Joldan and Chamnyet. He got his bachelor's degree in education from the Punjab University, Lahore. He died at the age of 85 at Leh. The Govt. Degree College at Leh is named after him. His students includes top political leaders, doctors, scholars and other intelligentsia of Ladakh on 23 June 2001. He would always prefer the traditional Ladakhi Goncha over western pants and shirts.

== Early life and career ==
He came from an influential Ladakhi Christian family. His grandfather Samuel Joldan was post master at Leh while his father Jonathan Tharchin Joldan was an important trade official entitled Aksakal - official in charge of the Central Asian Trade between Yarkand and Leh. He received primary education from the Tyndale Biscoe School in Srinagar and higher education from the S.P. College Srinagar and Prince Wales College Jammu. He also completed Bachelor of Education degree in teaching from the University of Punjab, Lahore. During his school days he took great interest in sports and later during his teaching years he would often accompany students in sporting and extra-curricular activities.

When he returned to Leh in 1940 after completing his education, his mother & other relatives hoped him to join the then high ranking position of a Tehsildar. However he went on to serve the society in the capacity of a teacher at the Government Middle School, Leh. During his time formal education was in the nascent stages. He used to go to the every household and talk to the parents about the importance of sending their children to school. He served for 35 years in the School Education DepartmentIn all, he served at the Government High School Leh for 25 years, Government High School Kargil for five years and around four years as the principal of the teacher's training school at Leh. During his service, he mentored a lot of students who later went on to become highly ranked officials, political leaders, doctors and engineers. Recounting his interest in books, Abdul Ghani Shiekh, a famous Ladakhi author, recounted that it was from Elizer Joldan that he first heard about the various works of Sir Arthur Conan Doyle. He was an avid writer. He was known to write lengthy writers to his daughters who were studying outside Ladakh which often ran into more than 10 pages. Some of the letters preserved by one of his daughters with the intention of publishing them into a book form were destroyed in the 2014 floods in Kashmir. He has written a book "Harvest Festival of the Buddhist Dards and other essay" besides many of his essays have been collected in another collection entitled "Central Asian Trades and Other Essays on Ladakh".

== Later life ==
Towards the later part of his life he was offered the position of District Education Officer which he declined owing to his failing health and his being vary of political interference in the education system. He retired from service in the year 1971. After retirement he spent his time writing besides running a guest house which was started in the year 1983.

He was survived by Kunga Joldan (wife) and his daughters Elza, Martha and Tadzin Joldan.
