= Karan Nagar =

- Location in Jammu and Kashmir, India Karan Nagar (India)
- Coordinates: 34°4′45″N 74°47′59″E
- Country: India
- Union territory: Jammu and Kashmir
- District: Srinagar
- Settled: Ancient
- Elevation: 1,592 m (5,223 ft)

Languages
  - Official: Kashmiri, Urdu, Hindi, Dogri, English
- Time zone: UTC+5:30 (IST)
- PIN: 190010
- Distance from Delhi: 857 kilometres (533 mi)
- Distance from Mumbai: 2,182.4 kilometres (1,356.1 mi)

Karan Nagar is a notified area and a town in the city of Srinagar, in the Indian-administered union territory of Jammu and Kashmir. A portion of Karan Nagar, known as Deewan Bagh, was the first declared civil colony in 1942 by the former princely state government of Jammu and Kashmir. It is a posh locality of Srinagar city. The famous SMHS hospital and Government Medical College are located here. It is located about 2 km (1.2 mi) from the commercial center of Kashmir, Lal Chowk.

== Etymology ==
Karan Nagar is named after Karan Singh, the prince regent of Jammu and Kashmir. Karan Nagar was the land owned by Karan's father Hari Singh, the last Maharaja of Jammu and Kashmir.

== History ==
The property of Karan Nagar was sold by Karan Singh's Dharmarth Trust to the state government. The town had a significant population of Kashmiri Pandits before their exile in last decade of twentieth century.

== Demographics ==
Kashmiri is the local language in the area. English and Urdu are also used as official languages.

== Geography ==
The area is located at 34.0791°N 74.799°E, about 2 km (1.2 mi) north of the district headquarters of Srinagar. The area is bounded by Aali Kadal to the South, Batmaloo to the West, Safa Kadal to the North, and Nawabazar to the East. The area is situated at an elevation of 1,592 m (5,223 ft) above mean sea level.

== All Saints Church ==
All Saints Church, also known as All Hallows Church, is a historical Protestant church located in Karan Nagar. It is part of the Church of North India. The church is dedicated to All Saints.

== Gallery ==
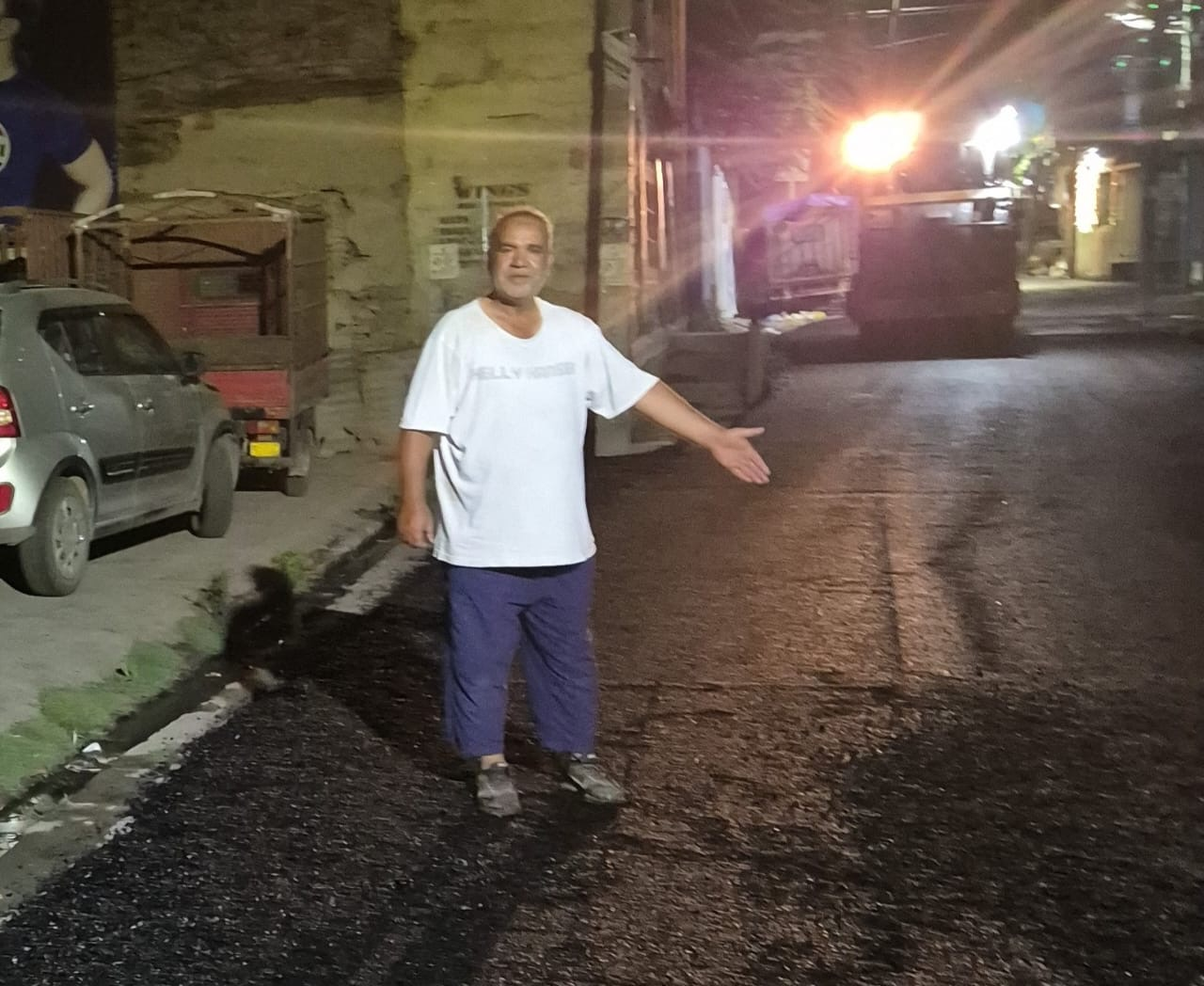
Engineer directing patch macadamisation of road in Karan Nagar, Srinagar.

== See also ==
- Lal Bazar
- Rajbagh
- Soura
