= Mehmooda Ali Shah =

Indian educationist, social activist

- Born: 1920; Srinagar, Jammu and Kashmir, India
- Died: 11 March 2014 (aged 93–94); Srinagar, Jammu and Kashmir, India
- Resting place: Malteng graveyard, Sri Nagar, Jammu and Kashmir
- Occupations: Educationist; Social activist Politician
- Known for: Women's education
- Parent(s): Syed Ahmed Ali Shah; Dulhan Begum
- Awards: Padma Shri; Most Outstanding Student of the Century

Mehmooda Ahmed Ali Shah (1920–2014), also known as Miss Mehmooda, was an Indian educationist, social activist and the principal of Government College for Women, M.A. Road Srinagar. She was a close friend of Indira Gandhi and is reported to have worked for creating awareness among the women of Kashmir about the importance of education and for their social empowerment. The Government of India awarded her the fourth highest civilian honour of the Padma Shri, in 2006, for her contributions to Indian education.

== Biography ==
Mehmooda Ali Shah was born in 1920 to Dulhan Begum and Syed Ahmed Ali Shah, a Forest Range Officer, in Srinagar in the princely state of Kashmir in the British India and did her schooling at the local Missionary Girls' School (present day Mallinson Girls School) from where was the first girl to pass the 10th standard examination. She was the only girl child of the Ali Shah couple, her three brothers would later become high ranking officials; Naseer Ahmed, a medical academic and a medical college principal, Syed Ahmad Shah, a Deputy Inspector General of Police and the third, Zameer Ahmad, a sessions judge. Moving to Lahore for her higher studies, she graduated in Arts (BA) from the Punjab University, Lahore and continued there to secure a graduate degree in Education (BEd) and a post graduate degree (MA) in Political Science. She is known to be the first woman post graduate of the Punjab University, Lahore. She also gained a postgraduate diploma in Leeds, UK.

Reportedly on advice from Muhammad Iqbal, the poet and political thinker, Mehmooda returned to Sri Nagar and joined a local school in Maisuma as a teacher. Later, when a new school was opened at Baramulla by the then Maharajah, she was appointed as the Headmistress. She worked there for a number of years till her appointment as the principal of the Government College for Women, M.A. Road Srinagar in 1954. During her tenure as the Headmistress and, later, as the principal, she is known to have worked to persuade the local women to pursue education and for the establishment of a second women's college in Srinagar. Her efforts are also reported in promoting arts and sports activities in the college. In 1975, she resigned from the college and, reportedly influenced by her association with Indira Gandhi, moved to Delhi to get involved with the activities of the Indian National Congress. She served the party as a Secretary of the All India Congress Committee (AICC), but returned to Srinagar after the death of Indira Gandhi in 1984, though she remained a member of the AICC. She also served as a member of the Jammu and Kashmir Legislative Assembly from 1987 to 1990.

The Government of India awarded her the civilian honour of the Padma Shri in 2006. In 2012, her alma mater, Mallinson Girls School, honoured her as the "Most Outstanding Student of the Century". Mehmooda, a spinster throughout her life by choice, died on 11 March 2014, at the age of 94, at her residence in Srinagar. She was buried at the local graveyard in Malteng.

== See also ==
- Government College for Women, M.A. Road Srinagar
- Muhammad Iqbal
