= Cecil Tyndale-Biscoe =

British missionary and educationist

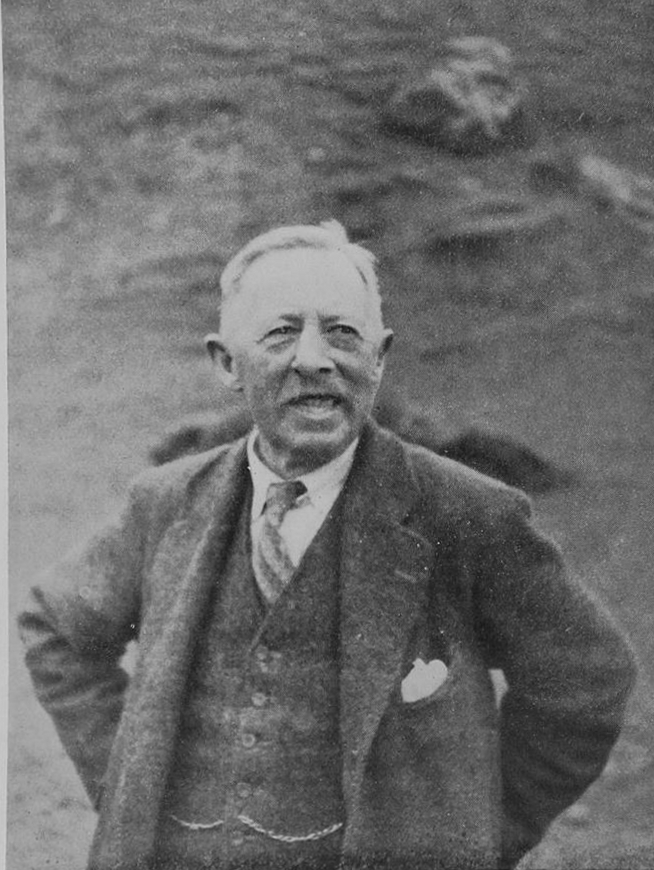

Cecil Earle Tyndale-Biscoe (9 February 1863 – 1 August 1949) was a British missionary and educationist, who worked in Kashmir where he established the famous Tyndale Biscoe School.

== Life ==
Biscoe was born at Holton near Oxford, England, into a land-owning family, the son of William Earle Biscoe and his wife Elizabeth Carey Sandeman. He was educated at Bradfield College, and then Jesus College, Cambridge. At university he coxed the winning Cambridge crew in the 1884 Boat Race. In 1885 he coxed the winning Jesus College crew in the Grand Challenge Cup at Henley Royal Regatta. After being awarded a BA, he was ordained as a priest of the Church of England. After a short time working in London's East End, in 1890 Tyndale-Biscoe was appointed to a missionary school in Kashmir by the Church Missionary Society.

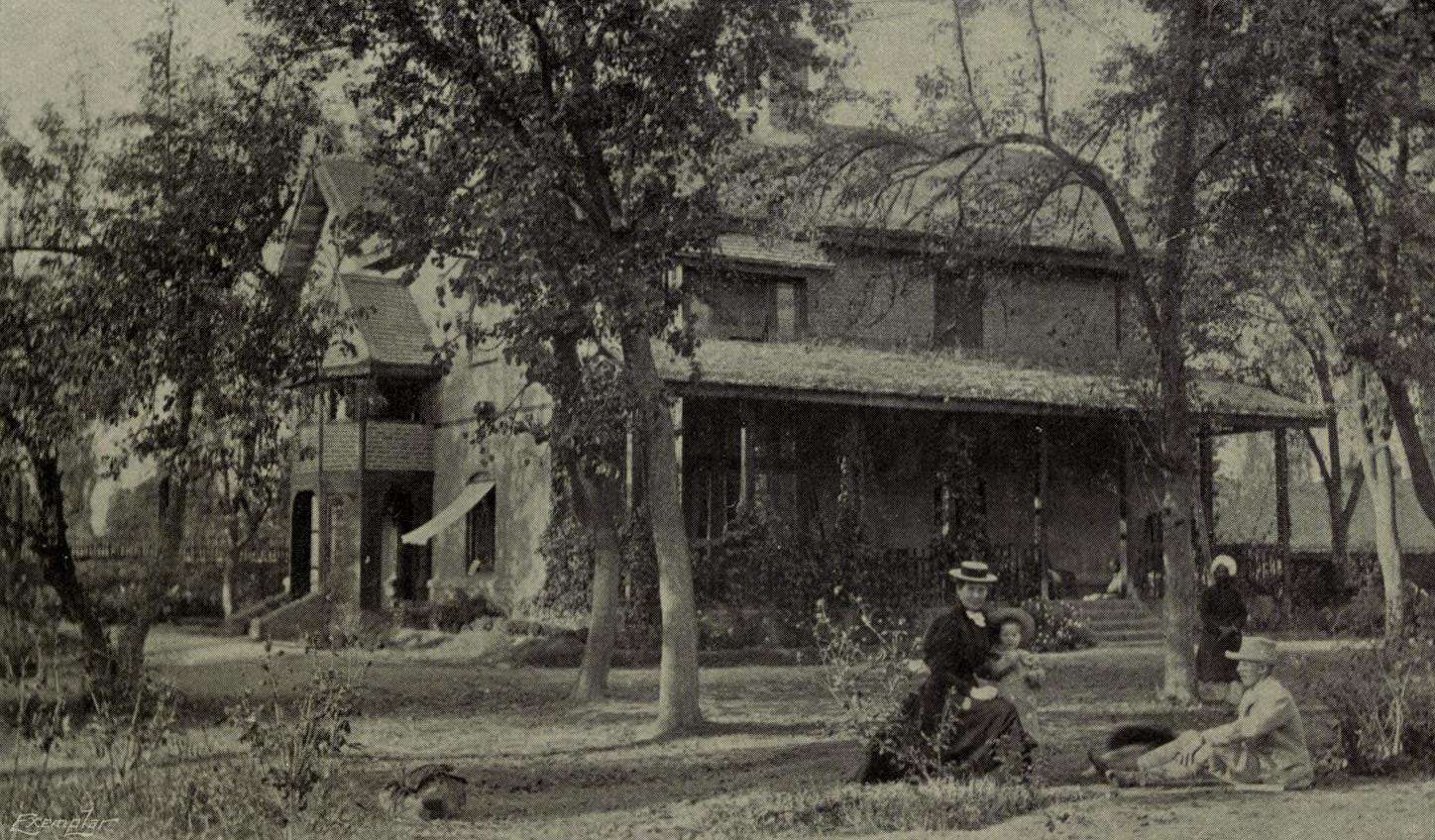
Holton Cottage in Kashmir

Tyndale-Biscoe married Blanche Violet Burges, daughter of Reverend Richard B. Burges, on 2 November 1891 and had four children. When Irene Petrie joined the mission she stayed with them at Holton Cottage.

In the late 19th century, Kashmir was a princely state made up of a Muslim majority ruled by a Maharaja and his Hindu minority. The Maharaja often utilized the services of British and European experts, though Kashmir was an independent kingdom. Seeing the squalid conditions and caste system as a serious problem, Tyndale-Biscoe aimed to use his own Christian values and western civic ideals to improve Kashmiri society. Although he did not actively pursue conversions as much as his missionary backers would have liked, Tyndale-Biscoe was a convinced imperialist and supporter of the India Defence League.

Tyndale-Biscoe's educational philosophy was one in which conspicuous intellect, or "cleverness", was valued less than the acquisition of more profound attributes and abilities. His schooling placed emphasis on physical activities – boxing, boating, football – which would stimulate senses of courage, masculinity and physical fitness. The pupils were also engaged in civic duties, such as street-cleaning, and in helping deal with flooding and cholera. Enforcing participation in team sports and activities in a highly socially stratified culture had significance beyond the replication of Tyndale-Biscoe's English public school educational experience.

By his later years, Tyndale-Biscoe had founded six schools with 1,800 students. In 1912 he received the Kaisar-I-Hind Medal, and an additional bar in 1929. After Indian independence, he left for what was then known as Southern Rhodesia, where he died in 1949.

== See also ==
- Cecil Hugh Tyndale-Biscoe
- Tyndale Biscoe School
- List of Cambridge University Boat Race crews
