= 2014 India–Pakistan floods =

Natural disaster in Kashmir

2014 India-Pakistan floods
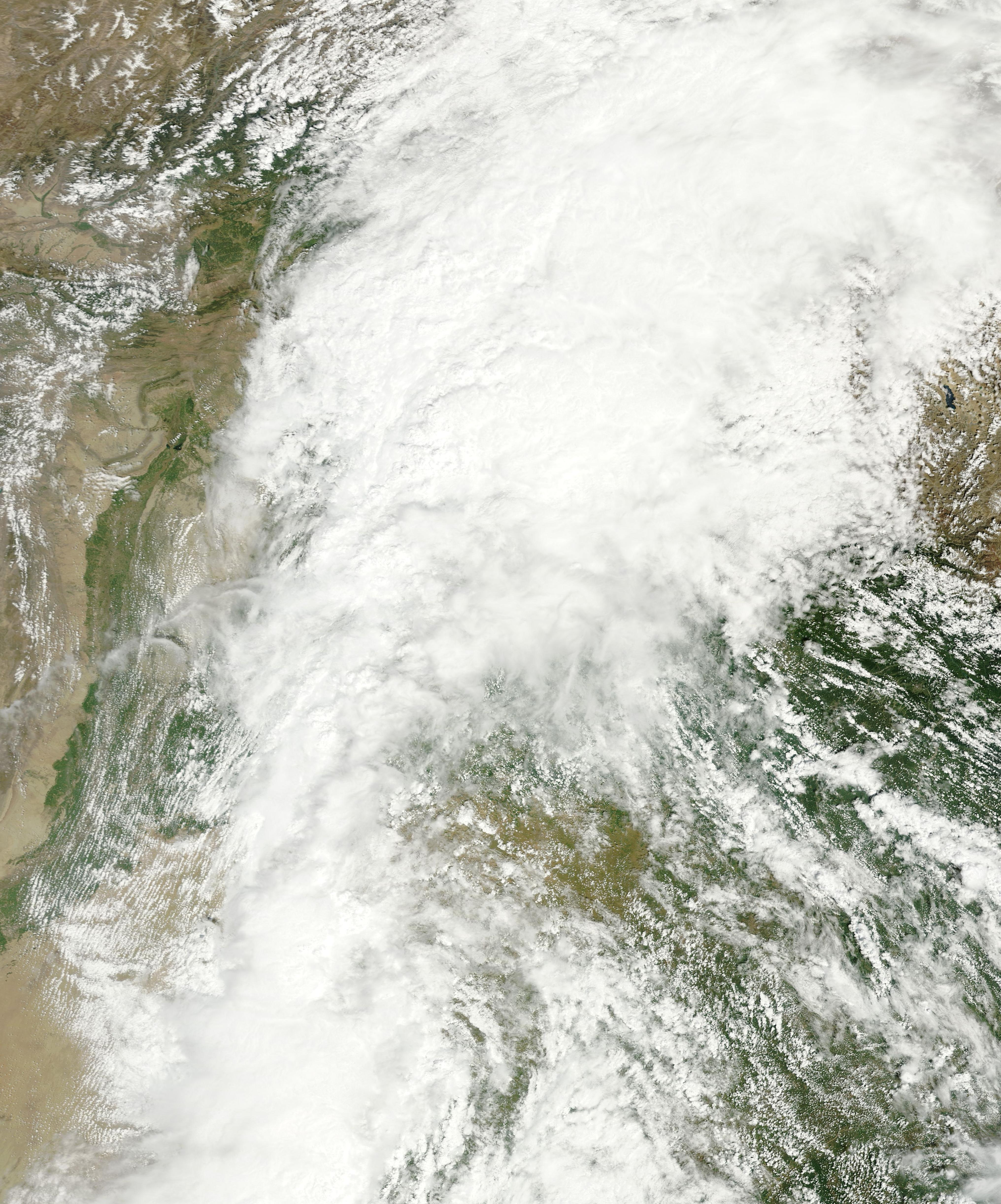
- This image of the northern Indian subcontinent cured by NASA on 4 September 2014 shows heavy clouds over Jammu and Kashmir
- Date: 2–26 September 2014
- Location: India Jammu and Kashmir Pakistan Azad Kashmir Gilgit-Baltistan Punjab
- Deaths: 557; 277 in India; 280 in Pakistan
- Property damage: 2,551 villages affected 80,000 people evacuated

The Indus river system, which flows in the northern region of India and Pakistan is formed by major rivers of Indus, Jhelum, Chenab, Ravi, Beas and Sutlej

In September 2014, the Kashmir region suffered disastrous floods across many of its districts caused by torrential rainfall. The Indian state of Jammu and Kashmir, as well as the Pakistani territories of Azad Kashmir, Gilgit-Baltistan and the province of Punjab were affected by these floods. By 24 September 2014, nearly 277 people in India and about 280 people in Pakistan had died due to the floods.

== Origin ==
The erstwhile state of Jammu and Kashmir and its adjoining areas received heavy rainfall from 2 September 2014, during the last stage of the monsoon in India. This triggered flooding and landslides in India and the adjoining areas of Pakistan. On 5 September, the Jhelum River in Srinagar was reported to be flowing at 22.40 feet (6.83 m) which was 4.40 feet (1.34 m) above the danger mark and at 33 feet (10 m) at Sangam in Anantnag district above the danger mark. The discharge rate in the river was recorded as 70,000 cusecs against the normal discharge of 25,000 cusecs. The Chenab River was also reported to flow above the danger mark by which hundreds of villages were affected in Pakistan. These rivers flooded into the streets causing heavy casualties and loss of property.

== Affected areas ==
=== India ===
According to the Home Ministry of India, several thousand villages across the state had been hit and 390 villages had been completely submerged. In actual figures 2600 villages were reported to be affected in Jammu and Kashmir, out of which 390 villages in Kashmir were completely submerged. 1225 villages were partially affected and 1000 villages were affected in Jammu Division Many parts of Srinagar, including the Border Security Force (BSF) HQ in Sanant Nagar & Army cantonment in Badam Bagh, were inundated, and vital roads were submerged, by the floods.

=== Pakistan ===
The strongest post monsoon storm ever recorded in Pakistan's recorded history took place on 3 September on a very low pressure system which started to affect parts of Jammu and Kashmir and northeast Pakistani districts of Sialkot, Lahore, Narowal, Mandi Bahauddin, Gujranwala, Hafizabad and Sheikhupura. By fourth, the rains became more widespread as the northern Punjab, Pakistan, Azad Kashmir and Khyber Pakhtunkhwa including the twin cities of Rawalpindi/Islamabad, Mangla, Rawalakot, Kotli and Jhelum. The heaviest amounts of rainfall however were recorded on 4 and 5 September as several weather stations broke their 24-hour, 48-hour and total monthly rainfall records for the month of September.

The chief amounts of total rainfall (in mm) as a result of this spell is as follows: (recorded between 3 and 5 September)

- Palandari, Rawalakot, Azad Kashmir 981
- Lahore: Airport 498, Shahi Qila 466, Misri Shah 453, Shahdra 452, Upper Mall 389, Jail Road 379
- Sialkot: Cantt 471, Airport 346
- Rawalakot, Kashmir 464
- Kotli, Kashmir 410
- Rawalpindi: Airport 336, Shamasabad 311, Bokra 208
- Gujranwala: 286
- Kasur 280
- Islamabad: (Zero Point) 274, Saidpur 268, Golara Sharif 209
- Okara 257
- Gujrat 231
- Murree 204
- Jhelum 203

== Live events ==
On 8 September, in many places of Srinagar's neighbourhood, the water was about 12 feet (3.7 m) deep, submerging entire houses. Stranded residents left their homes to move in with friends or relatives in safer areas. The death toll till 10 September had crossed 190 in Kashmir Valley and areas affected by the floods were mostly districts in South Kashmir.

== Consequences ==
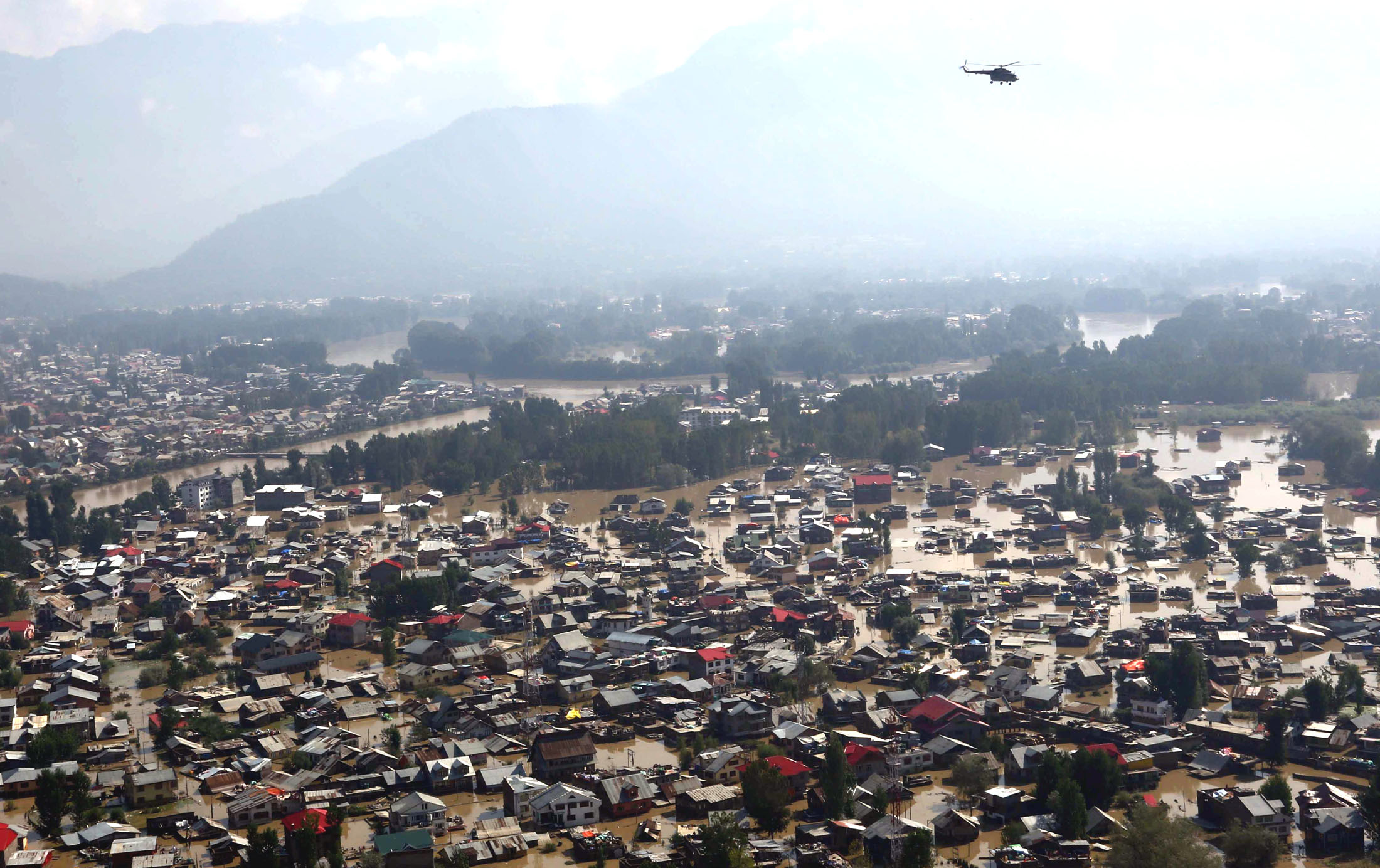
An aerial view of Srinagar submerged under water in September 2014

=== India ===
In Srinagar, most of the city areas were submerged under water. The river Jhelum spilled over submerging Sonwar Bagh, Shivpora, Batwara, Soitang, Lasjan, Padshai bagh, Natipora, Pandrathan, LalChowk, Rajbagh, Jawahar Nagar, Gogji Bagh and Wazir Bagh neighbourhoods of city. The first and the second storey of the houses and hotels in Rajbagh that were packed with tourists were submerged. According to Omar Abdullah, the Chief Minister of Jammu and Kashmir then, boats had been brought from Delhi to help with evacuations, and the air force had begun rescue operations in the city.

50 bridges were reported to have been damaged across the state. The preliminary assessment of damages to property was estimated between INR 5000 cr to INR 6000 cr. The state government requested the central government for 25,000 tents and 40,000,000 blankets for the affected people. There was a total estimated loss of 1 trillion INR to Kashmir division alone.

In the Jammu Division, landslides triggered by heavy rainfall had damaged roads, dozens of bridges, buildings and crops. Vehicular traffic had been stopped on the Jammu-Pathankot highway. Katra-bound trains were halted. Haj flights scheduled up to 12 September were postponed. The Jammu-Pathankot national highway was opened on 8 September, after the water level receded. Srinagar-Leh Highway reopened for traffic on 9 September. The Prime Minister of India Narendra Modi called it a "national calamity".

=== Pakistan ===
Flow of destruction as flood water entered Multan villages. While the Trimmu Head works was saved from the peak flood discharge, more than 350 villages in Jhang District were flooded due to the breaches made at two places in Athari Hazari dyke, leaving trail of destruction behind. As the floodwater moved further south, water level started increasing at Panjnad and had reached 116,000 cusecs, flooding areas in Mittan Kot and 300 villages in Multan District. National Disaster Management Authority (NDMA) said that 257 people had been killed and more than 1.1 million were affected by the floods. According to reports, the Trimmu Head works, safely discharged 650,000 cusecs of water resulting in the water levels to recede. Three people were reported killed in Jhang and nine in Chiniot.

== Rescue operations ==
=== India ===
- IAF rescue

Home Secretary of India Anil Goswami said 82 aircraft and helicopters, 10 battalions of Border Security Force, 329 columns of Indian Army and 300 boats were used in the rescue operations. According to home secretary, 10 VSAT systems were air lifted to restore critical telecom towers and a satellite link from Bardula had been provided for crucial communication. The Indian Army showing their ingenuity used some old fashioned Indian Juggar and converted their trucks to mobile charging platforms for the people to charge their mobile phones. Two IL 76, One C-130J and one AN 32 aircraft carried a total of 50 tonnes of supplies including food, water and medicines. 300 boats were dispatched to South Kashmir for excavation of people from submerged areas. Armed Forces including Border Security Force (B.S.F) and National Disaster Response Force (NDRF) rescued over 200,000 people from different regions of Jammu and Kashmir. Bharat Sanchar Nigam Limited (BSNL) launched an operation on a war-footing with Indian Army and Indian Air Force (IAF) to restore mobile services through satellite network and the telecom network.

Home Ministry had been sent to Srinagar to monitor rescue operations. The government also set up control rooms in Delhi and asked people to approach it with details of their trapped families.

- Local rescue

Lt. General Subrata Saha of the Indian Army said that the rescue efforts of the Army would not have been possible without the assistance and efforts of the local youth. Every second or third boat of the Army went to the local volunteers. "The Army salutes the efforts put by the youth of the Valley," he said. "If not for these local youths, who have guided us to reach the places, I cannot say how we would have been able to accomplish the mission." The daily Rising Kashmir quoted an Indian Army trooper saying that, while the Army was doing its bit to rescue the people, it could not match the job done by the locals. The trooper further stated that the Indian news channels focused on covering the Army more than the plight of the victims, which was causing resentment among the local people. The total of about 200,000 people were rescued, including 87,000 from Srinagar city.

=== Pakistan ===
The Pakistani Army and the Pakistani Air Force carried out most of the rescue operations like dropping food packets, packaged drinking water and winching stranded people from their roof tops using helicopters.

== Relief ==
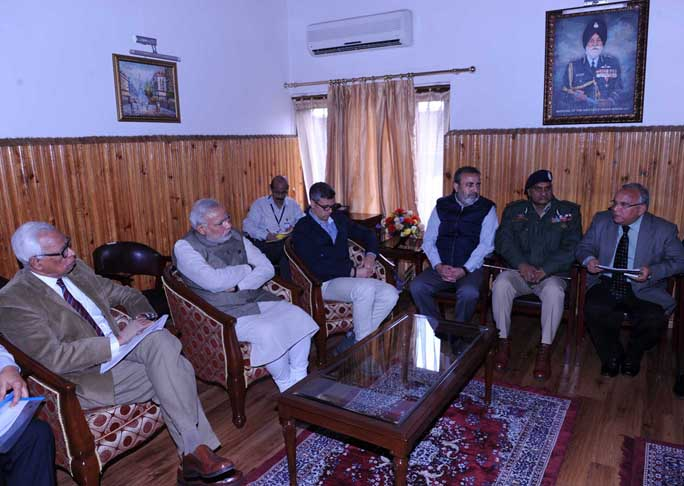
Prime Minister Narendra Modi and Jammu and Kashmir Chief Minister Omar Abdullah at a high-level meeting, on 7 September 2014, to assess the situation arising out of incessant rain and floods in the state.

The Prime Minister of India, Shri Narendra Modi, offered an assistance of ₹745 crore (US$77 million) to the state government, this was in addition to ₹1,100 crore (US$110 million) already earmarked for the disaster. Chief Minister of Maharashtra and Chief Minister of Telangana announced an aid of ₹10 crore (US$1.0 million) each from the chief minister's relief fund for the rescue and relief for Jammu and Kashmir flood victims, in addition to that Government of Telangana has also announced to send 50 water purifiers worth ₹2.5 crore (US$260,000) for safe drinking water for flood affected areas. Also, Madhya Pradesh, Tamil Nadu, Gujarat and Andhra Pradesh, announced an assistance of ₹5 crore (US$520,000) each and appealed to the people to come forward and help those in need.

Jammu and Kashmir Chief Minister Omar Abdullah announced relief package for those affected by the floods. It included Rs. 200 crore assistance for Jammu region and the valley and Rs. 3.5 lakh for the kin of those who lost their lives in the disaster which includes Rs. 2 lakh announced by Prime Minister Narendra Modi. Omar also announced financial assistance of Rs. 75,000 as initial installment for those who lost their homes. Free food supply will be supplied to the affected for six months which includes 50 kg of rice.

The United India Insurance Company also presented a cheque of Rs. 1 crore to Jammu and Kashmir Chief Minister Omar Abdullah for flood-affected people of the State. People from unaffected areas of Kashmir set up relief camps, collected and distributed relief among flood-ravaged people of Srinagar city. Jammu and Kashmir government ministers have called it the equivalent of Hurricane Katrina in Kashmir. Further, to help the people of Jammu & Kashmir, to build back all the damaged infrastructure, a student-professor duo, Saqib Gulzar and A. R. Dar at NIT Srinagar came up with Preliminary Guidelines for Repair, Restoration, Retrofitting & Rebuilding of Building Structures in Flood Affected Areas of Jammu & Kashmir. These guidelines were well received by the people of Jammu and Kashmir and helped them in building back the infrastructure damaged by the floods.

== See also ==
- 1992 India–Pakistan floods
- 2010 Pakistan floods
