= Rajbagh =

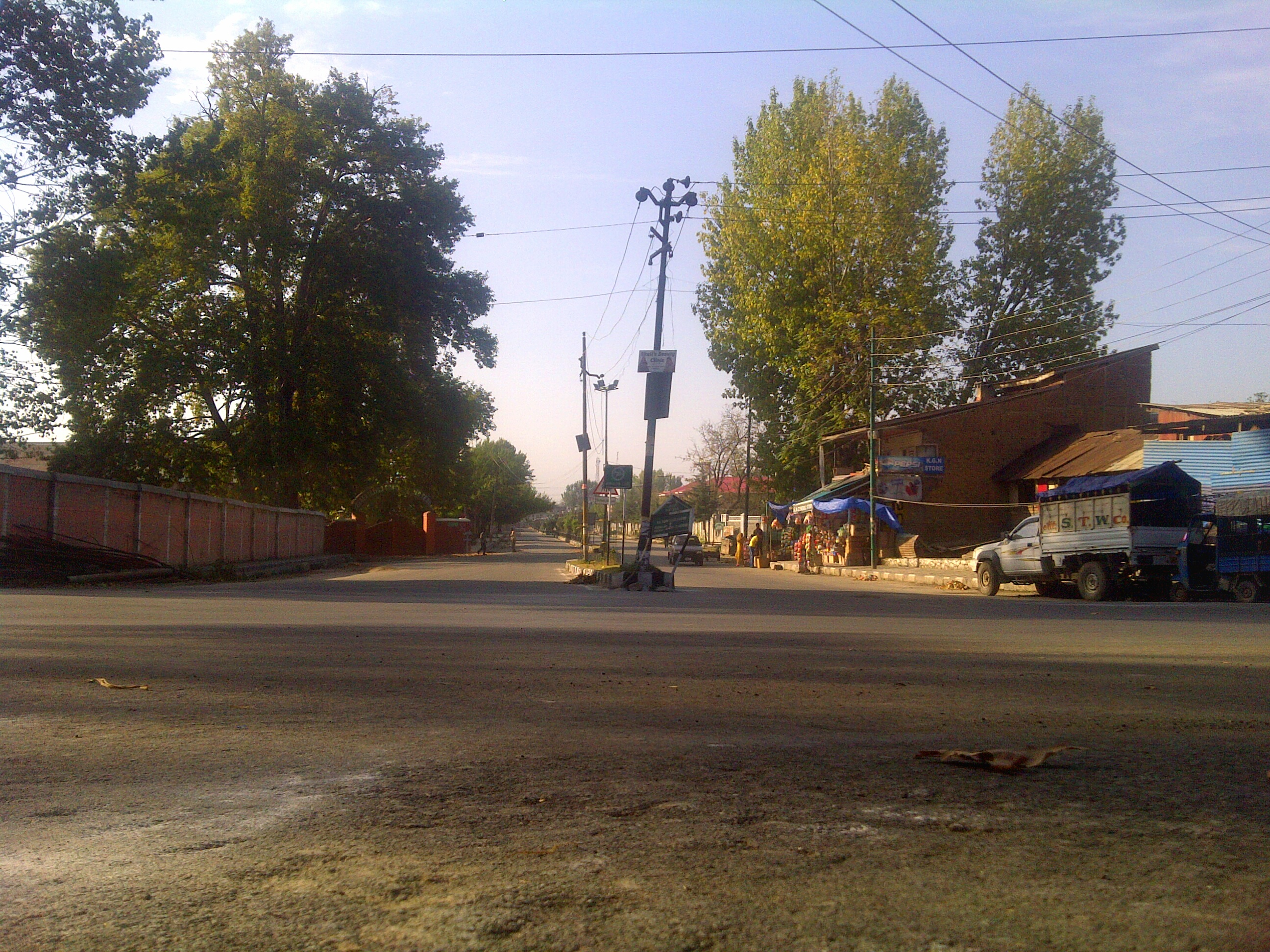
- Convent road Rajbagh

- Location in Jammu and Kashmir, India Rajbagh (India)
- Coordinates: 34°4′10″N 74°49′30″E
- Country: India
- Union territory: Jammu and Kashmir
- District: Srinagar
- Settled: Ancient
- Elevation: 1,592 m (5,223 ft)

Languages
  - Official: Kashmiri, Urdu, Hindi, Dogri, English
- Time zone: UTC+5:30 (IST)
- PIN: 190008
- Distance from Delhi: 826.4 kilometres (513.5 mi)
- Distance from Mumbai: 2,190.8 kilometres (1,361.3 mi)

Rajbagh is a notified area in the municipal committee of Srinagar, in the Indian Union Territory of Jammu and Kashmir. It comes under the Lal chowk constituency. Rajbagh is a posh locality in the Civil Lines area of Srinagar. The postal code of Rajbagh is 190008. Rajbagh is considered one of the many best residential places in Srinagar. There are many hotels, restaurants and schools in this locality. Rajbagh area was heavily damaged by the 2014 Kashmir floods; it was one of the worst affected areas due to the floods.

== Geography ==
Rajbagh is situated along the banks of the Jhelum River. It is located about 3.2 km (2.0 mi) from the commercial center of Kashmir. Ram Munshi Bagh, Shivpora, Guzarwaan Mohalla, and Jawahar Nagar are the nearby localities of Rajbagh. The area is located at an elevation of 1,592 m (5,223 ft) above mean sea level.

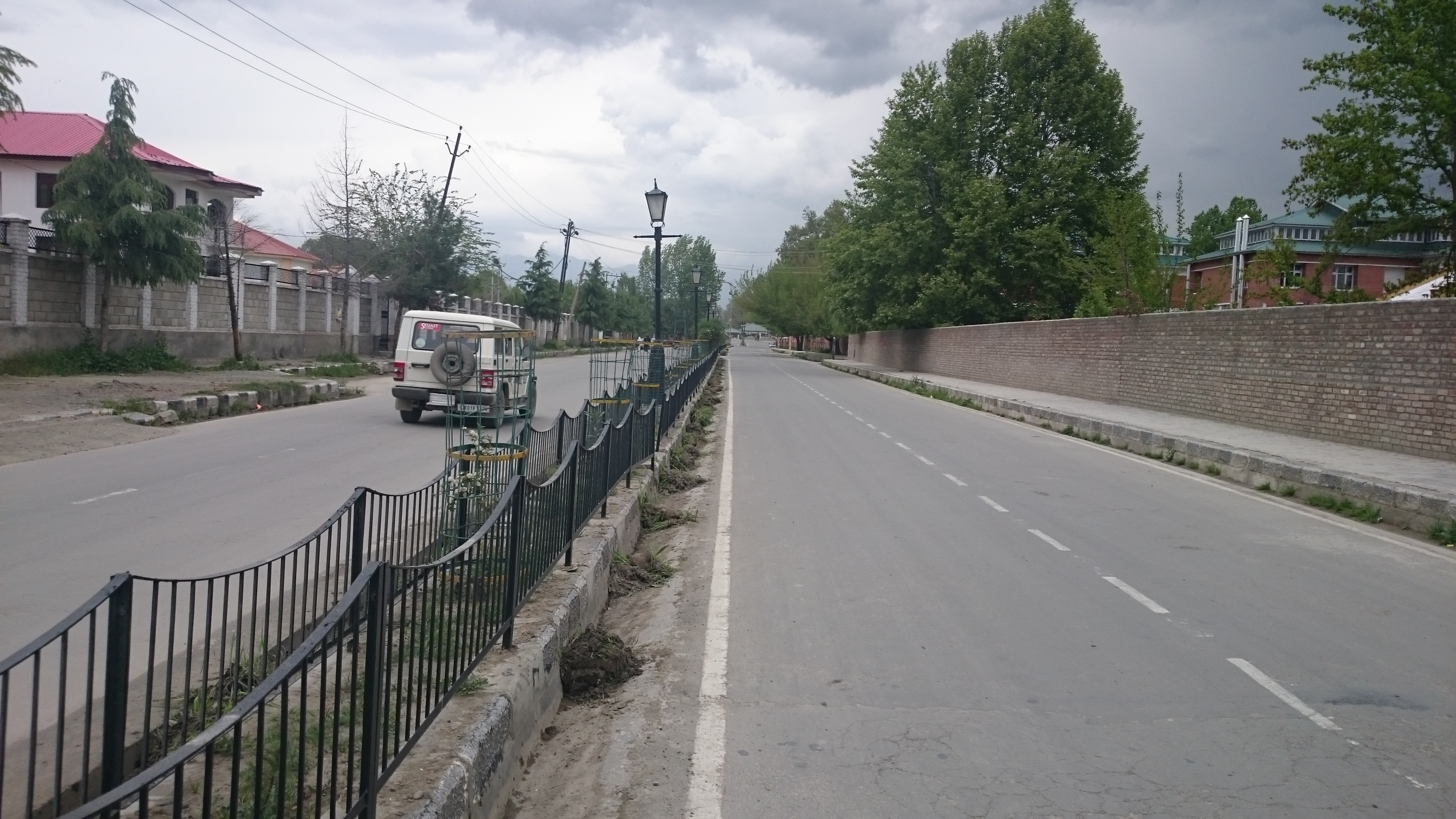
A view of Convent Road.

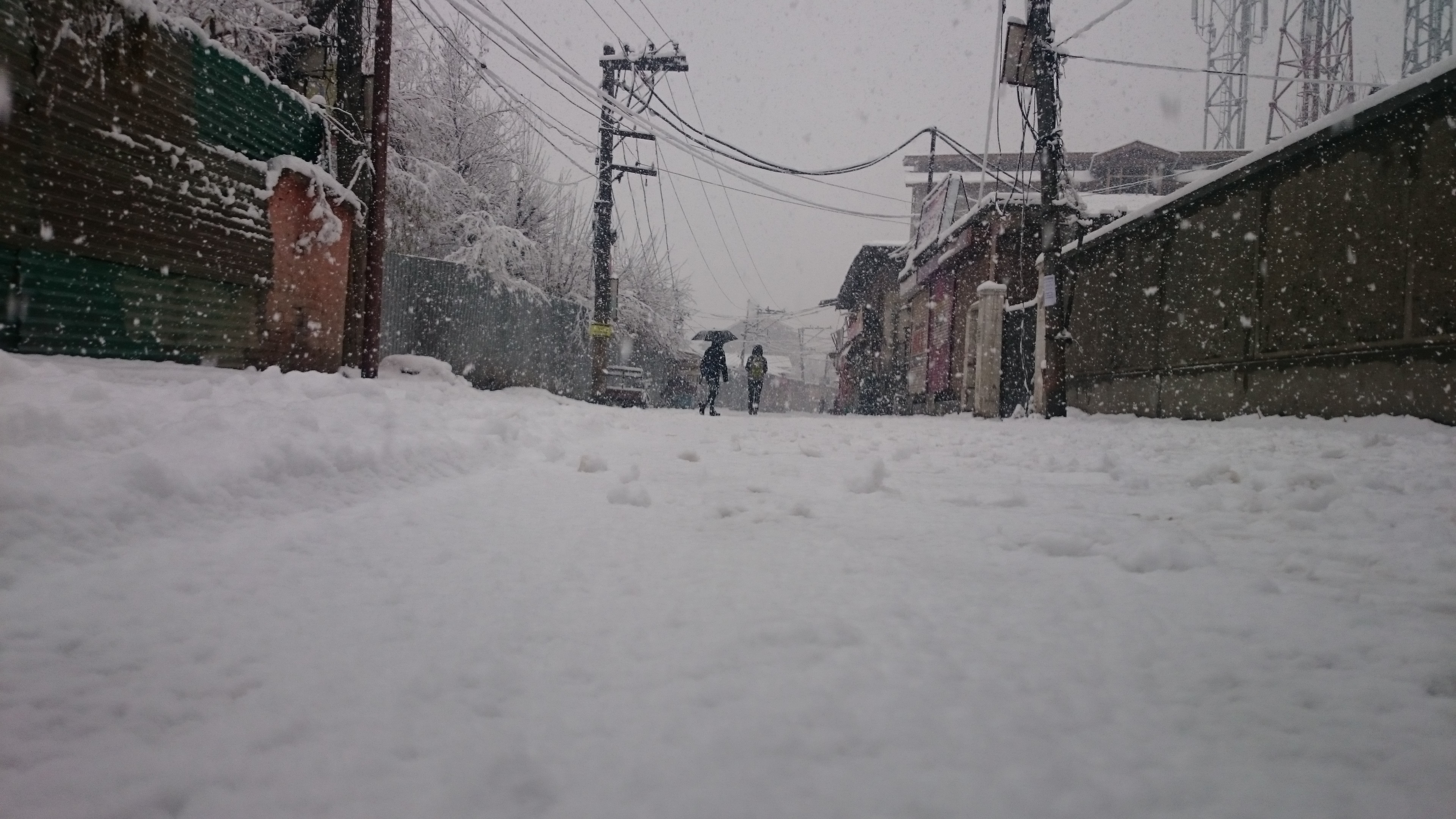
Snowfall in Rajbagh.

== Subdivisions ==
- Pathan Bagh
- Kursoo Rajbagh
- Rajbagh Extension
- Aramwari or Aramwear

== Education ==
There are more than 15 schools in the area. The prestigious girls' school, Presentation Convent High School, is located in this area.

The following schools are located in the area:

- Linton Hall School
- Muslim public High school
- Lawrence Vidya Bhawan School
- Presentation Convent High School
- Little Angels High School

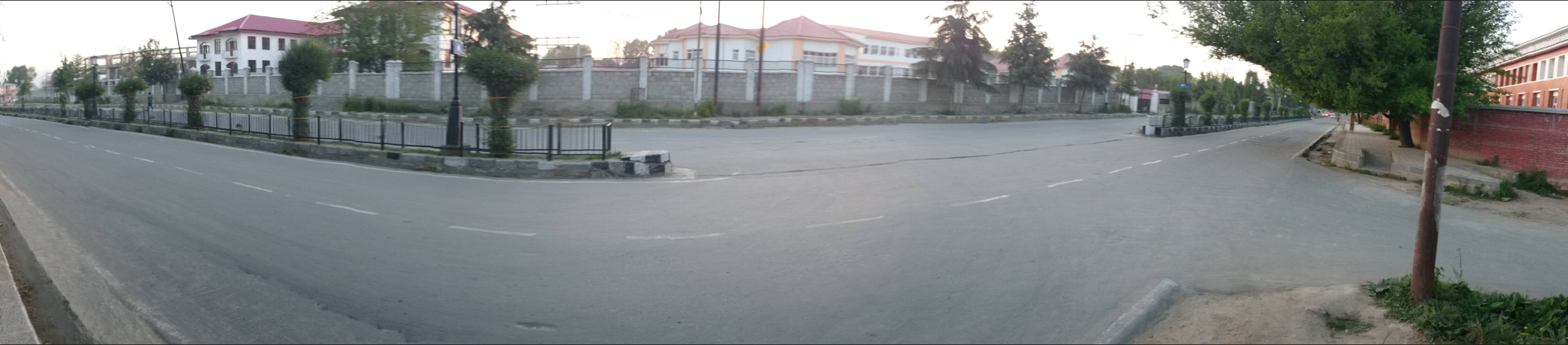
A panoramic view of Convent Road, Rajbagh.

== September floods ==
The area was damaged quite heavily by the 2014 Kashmir floods. At about 4:18 AM on 7 September, water started to enter the ground floors of the houses located in this locality, and by 3 PM, the water level had reached about 25 feet high above ground level on the streets. Some houses were fully submerged in water, others were partially submerged, and people were rescued from their houses by locals in shikaras and rafting boats. Rajbagh remained submerged for 25 days after the flood. The level of damage was extensive, making it one of the worst-affected areas during the flood.

== Known For ==
Rajbagh, located in the heart of Srinagar, is widely recognized for several reasons:

- Prime Location: Situated centrally, Rajbagh is one of Srinagar’s most prominent neighborhoods. It is close to key landmarks like Lal Chowk and Dal Lake, making it well-connected and accessible to locals.
- Educational Hub: The area is home to numerous schools and coaching centers.
- Cultural and Social Influence: Rajbagh has a rich cultural history, with many prominent families residing here. Its social significance contributes to its standing as one of Srinagar’s most influential neighborhoods.
- 2014 Flood Impact: The 2014 floods severely affected Rajbagh, attracting significant media attention. The floods caused major destruction in the area, and the subsequent rebuilding efforts brought additional recognition.

== See also ==
- Lal BazarLal Chowk
- Lal Chowk
- Soura
- Karan Nagar
- Indira Nagar, Srinagar
