= Badami Bagh =

Badami Bagh Badam Bagh
- Town
- Location in Jammu and Kashmir, India Badami Bagh (India)
- Coordinates: 34.07°N 74.85°E
- Country: India
- Union territory: Jammu and Kashmir
- District: Srinagar
- Elevation: 1,727 m (5,666 ft)

Population (2001)
  - Total: 13,477

Languages
  - Official: Kashmiri, Dogri, Urdu, Hindi, English
- Time zone: UTC+5:30 (IST)

Badami Bagh or Badam Bagah is a cantonment town on the outskirts of Srinagar in Jammu and Kashmir, India. Established in the 1920s as military barracks on a site containing several ancient Hindu and Budhhist ruins near Pandrethan, the Badami Bagh Cantonment currently serves as the headquarters of the Indian Army's Chinar Corps, with many of the army's soldiers residing here. The cantonment is established on the two road sides of Jammu–Srinagar National Highway, on the banks of the Jhelum River. A c. 8th–9th century architecturally significant Shiva Temple is located inside the cantonment.

== History ==
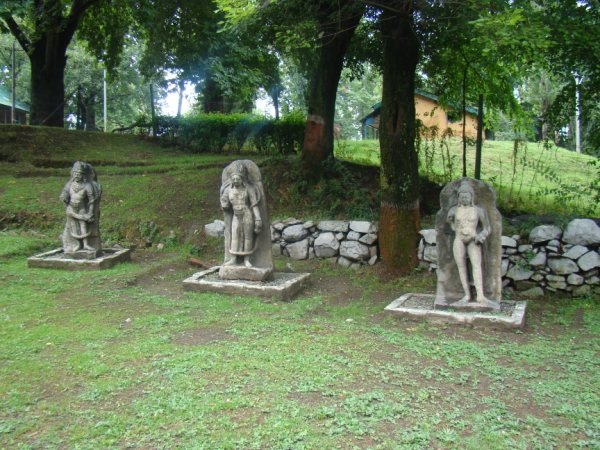
Ancient Buddhist and Hindu sculptures excavated from the former archaeological site of Pandrethan, where the cantonment is presently situated, exhibited inside the cantonment

The site of the present Badami Bagh military cantonment had formed part of the ancient city of Pandrethan, identified as the original site of the capital city of Srinagar. When the capital was shifted during the 6th century CE, the area came to be called puranadhisthana, meaning 'old capital' in Sanskrit, which corrupted to 'Pandrethan' over time. By the 19th century, the site had numerous ancient Hindu and Buddhist ruins, including ruins of two stupas and a monastery. Close to the end of 19th century, a Parsi aramgah was built in the area, on land gifted to the Parsi community by Maharaja Pratap Singh. Many Buddhist artefcts were excavated in 1915, and several Hindu sculptures were accidentally discovered during the construction of military barracks in the 1920s, when the area was appropriated for military use and cleared of most ruins. In the 1954, the cantonment was established, with a total area of 1458.537 acres, including 313.50 acres of civilian area and the remaining being military establishment. A building constructed between 1926 and 1930 during Dogra rule, within the present-day cantonment, was converted in 1994 into a museum focused on the militancy period and called Ibadat-e-Shahadat.

== Geography ==
Badami Bagh is located at 34.07°N 74.85°E. It has an average elevation of 1727 metres (5666 feet).

== Demographics ==
As of 2001 India census, Badami Bagh had a population of 13,477. Males constitute 53% of the population and females 47%. Badami Bagh has an average literacy rate of 71%, higher than the then national average of 59.5%; with 58% of the males and 42% of females literate. 6% of the population is under 6 years of age.
