= Lal Chowk =

Place in Srinagar, India

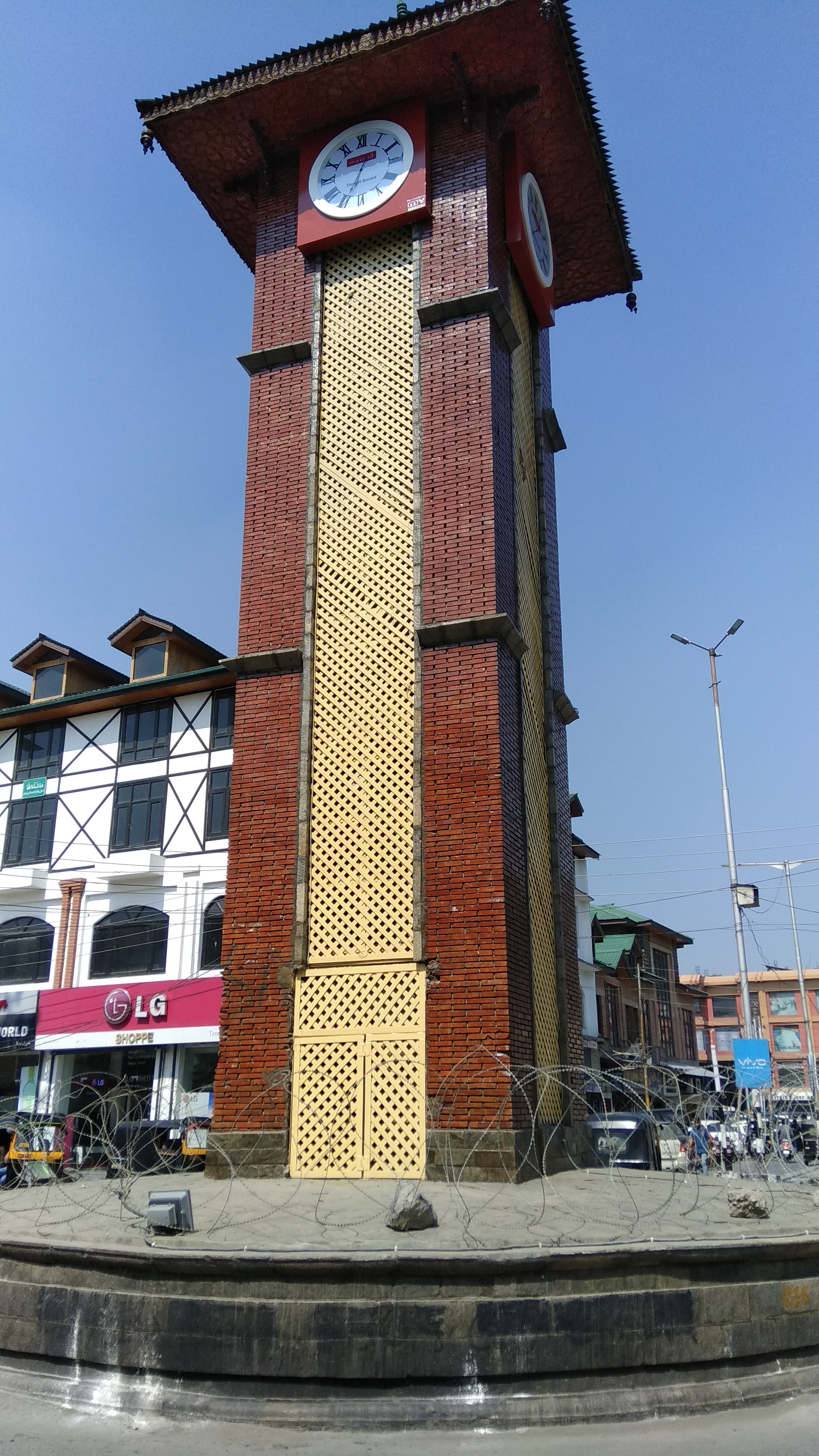
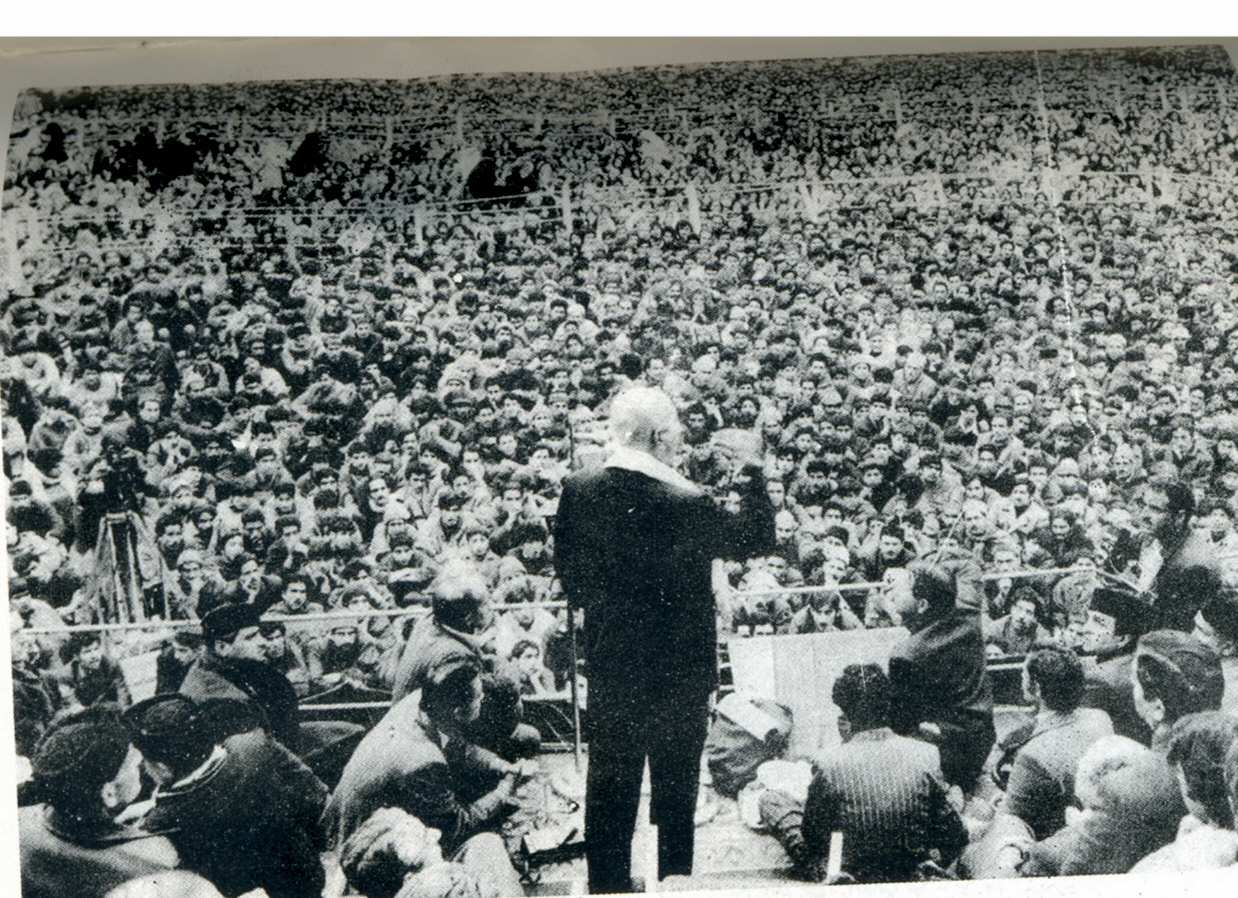
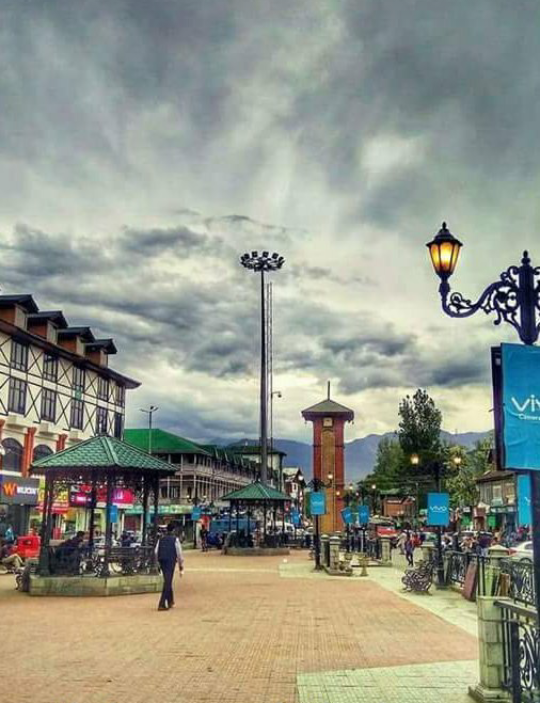
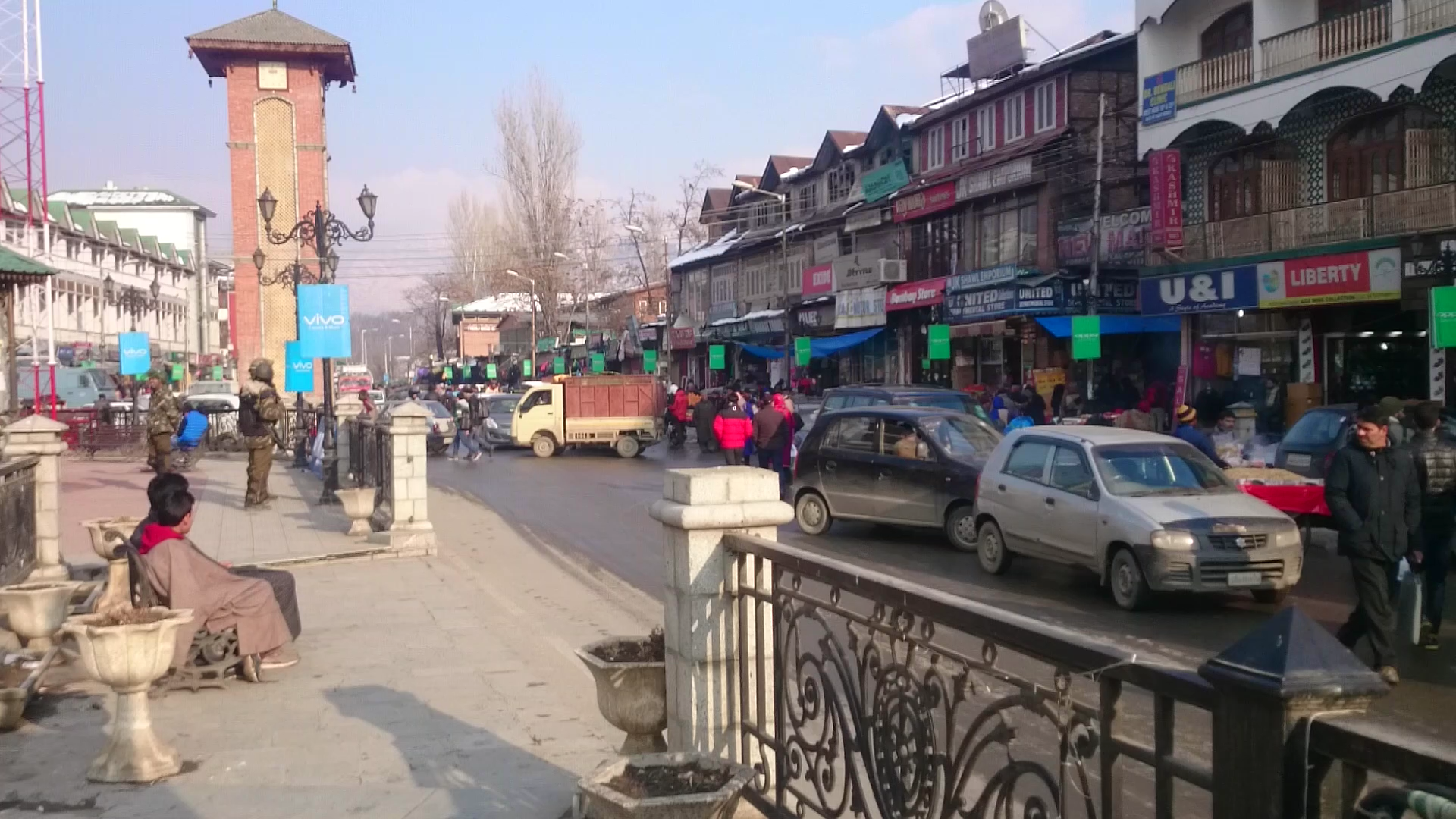
- From left to right, top to bottom: The clock tower at Lal Chowk; Sheikh Abdullah speaking at Lal Chowk in 1975; View of the square in 2017; Shops near the square
- Interactive map of Lal Chowk
- Namesake: Red Square during the Russian Revolution
- Length: 1 km (0.62 mi)
- Location: Srinagar, J&K, India
- PIN: 190001
- Coordinates: 34.0712°N 74.8106°E

Lal Chowk (lit. 'Red Square') is a city square in Srinagar, in the Indian union territory of Jammu and Kashmir. The square was given its name by left-wing activists who were inspired by the Russian Revolution as they fought the princely state Maharaja, Hari Singh. It has traditionally served as a place for political meetings, with Jawaharlal Nehru (the first prime minister of India) and Sheikh Abdullah of Jammu and Kashmir, respectively, as well as other prominent political leaders having addressed the people from it. The clock tower at Lal Chowk was built in 1980.

== Description ==
View of Lal Chowk's clock tower and premises

The Lal Chowk precinct stretches on both sides of the Residency Road between the Amira Kadal bridge and the Tyndale Biscoe School. It has evolved into Srinagar's main business district since the early twentieth century.

The Lal Chowk itself is a traffic roundabout towards its eastern end. It houses a clock tower (ganta ghar) constructed by Bajaj Electricals in 1980.

== History ==
Lal Chowk was the location where Jawaharlal Nehru, the first Prime Minister of India, unfurled the Indian national flag in 1948, shortly after the country gained independence from the British Empire. Following the Indo-Pakistani War of 1947–1948, Nehru stood in Lal Chowk and promised the Kashmiri people a chance to vote in a referendum whereby they would be able to choose their political future. The city square was also the location where Sheikh Abdullah, the first elected Prime Minister of Jammu and Kashmir, expressed his allegiance to Nehru and India in a Persian couplet, saying "Man Tu Shudam, Tu Man Shudi, Taqas Na Goyed, Man Degram Tu Degri (I became you and you became I; so none can say we are separate)".

=== 1990s ===
In 1990, separatists had dared anyone to try to raise the flag of India at Lal Chowk. The National Security Guards took up the challenge and raised the flag. The clock tower gained political significance in 1992, when the then Bharatiya Janata Party president, Murli Manohar Joshi along with several others such as now Prime Minister of India Narendra Modi, hoisted the Indian flag on top of the tower on Republic Day. Joshi hoisted the flag in the company of Indian troops. Since then, the Indian Border Security Force and Central Reserve Police Force undertook the hoisting ceremony until 2009, when they announced that continuing the ritual was unnecessary because the tower "had no political significance". Following this, official ceremonies were held at the nearby Bakshi Stadium in Wazir Bagh , Srinagar, on Republic Day and Independence Day.

=== 1993 Lal Chowk fire ===
In 1993, there was an arson attack on the main commercial centre of downtown Srinagar. (Note: The incident took place on 10 April 1993.) The fire was alleged to have been started by a crowd incited by separatist militants. The civilians and police officials interviewed by Human Rights Watch and other international organizations alleged that the Indian Border Security Force (BSF) set fire to the locality, apparently in retaliation for the burning of an abandoned BSF building by the residents. Over 125 Kashmiri civilians were killed in the incident.

== See also ==
- Lal Bazar
- Hazratbal
- Rajbagh
- Jawahar Nagar Srinagar
