= Lal Bazar =

- Locality
- Interactive map of Lal Bazar
- Coordinates: 34.14065°N 74.82559°E
- Country: India
- Union territory: Jammu and Kashmir
- District: Srinagar

Government
  - Type: Municipal corporation
  - Body: Srinagar Municipal Corporation

Languages
  - Official: Kashmiri, Urdu, English
- Time zone: UTC+5:30 (IST)
- PIN: 190023
- Vehicle registration: jk01
- Distance from Delhi: 835.4 kilometres (519.1 mi)

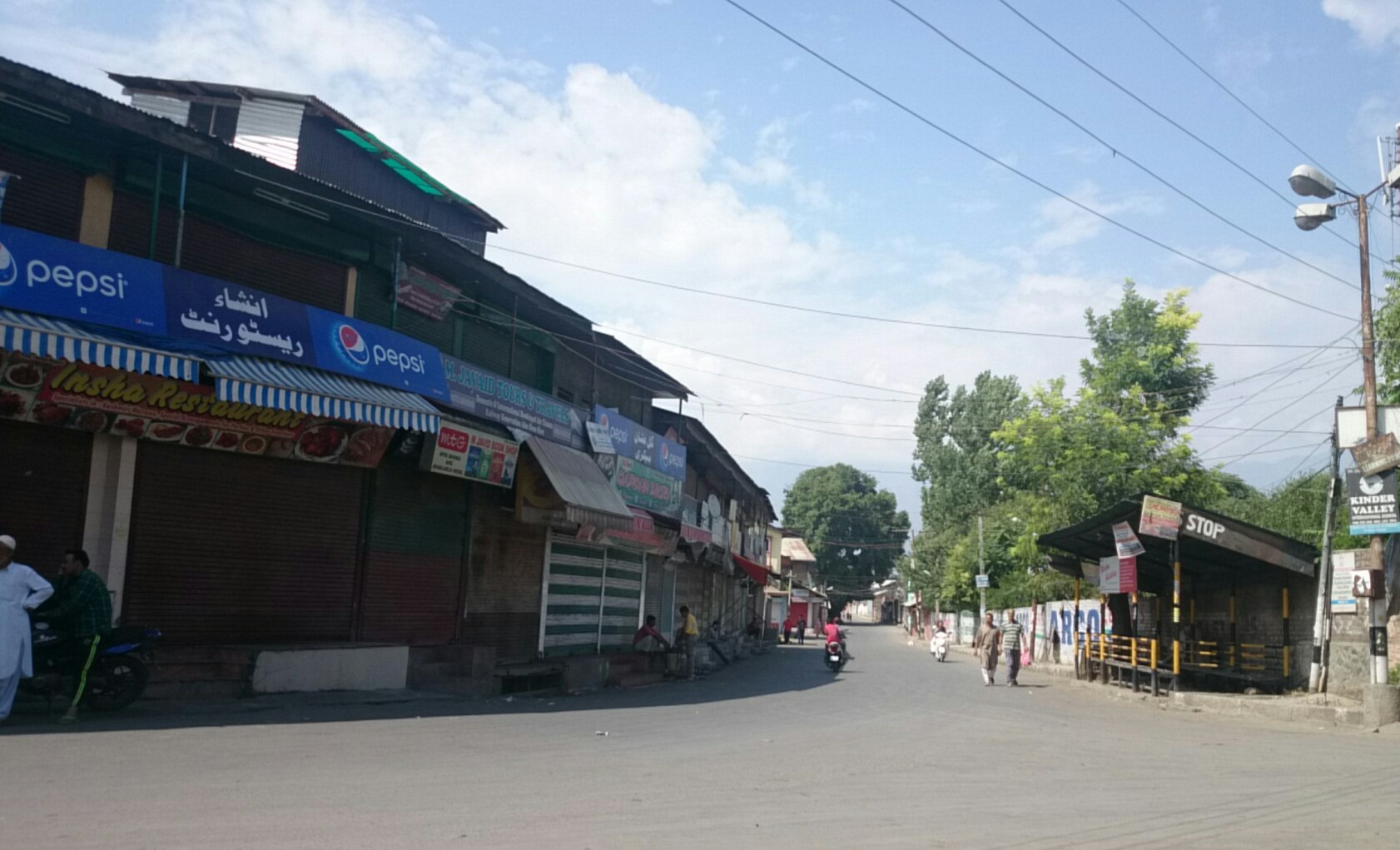
Lal Bazar's main street view.

Lal Bazar is a locality in the municipal committee of Srinagar in the Indian administered union territory of Jammu and Kashmir. It comes under the Zadibal constituency of the Srinagar Legislative Assembly. Lal Bazar is a well known area in the upper downtown area of Srinagar. The Pincode of Lal Bazar is 190023. Considered amongst the best residential areas in Srinagar the area has many amenities such as major banks and schools along with University of Kashmir, NIT Srinagar, Institute of Technology, University of Kashmir, Zakura Campus, Sher - i - Kashmir Institute of Medical Sciences close by, roughly 2 km from Lal Bazar.

== Location ==
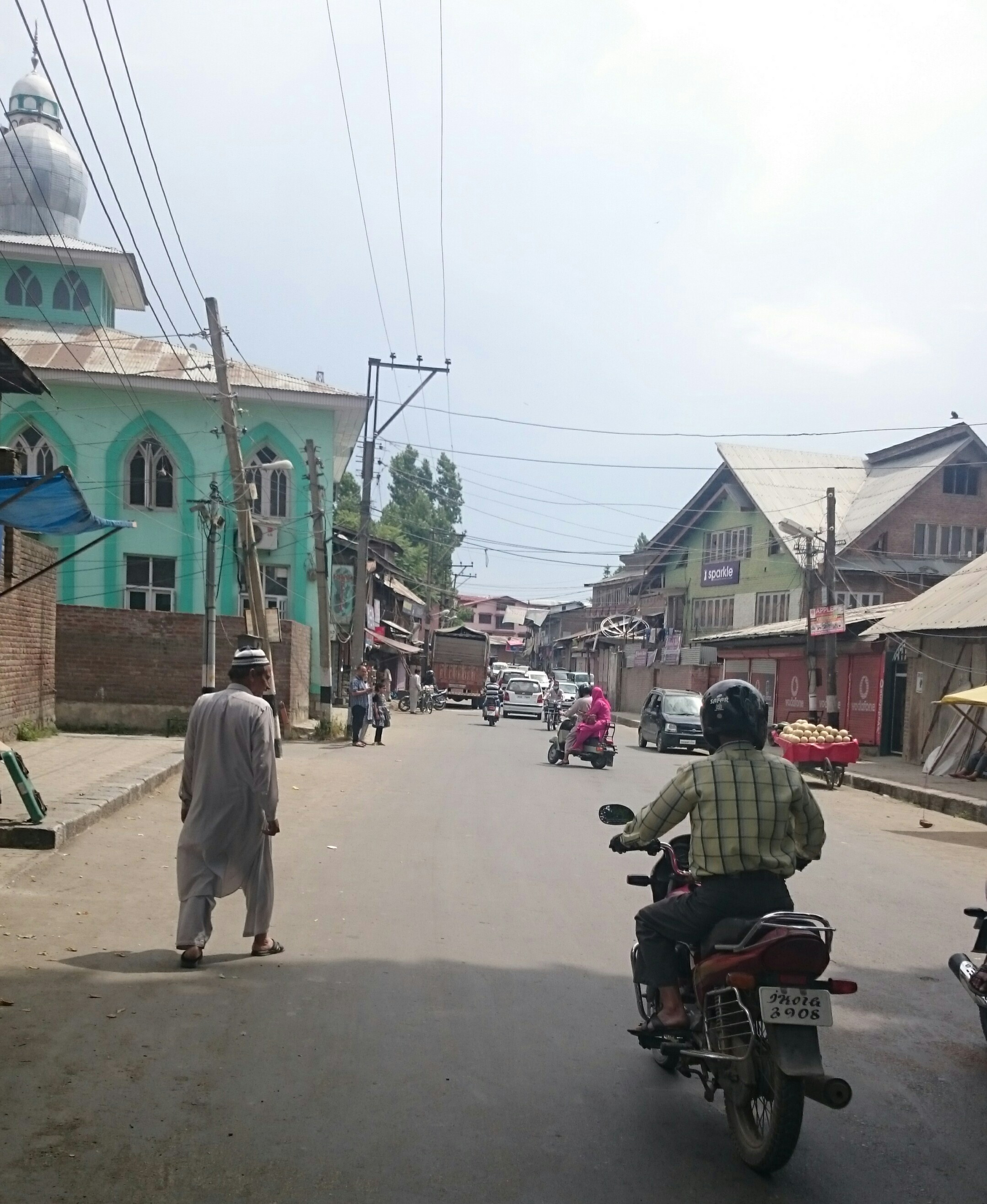
The street which heads towards one of Lal Bazar's bus stops

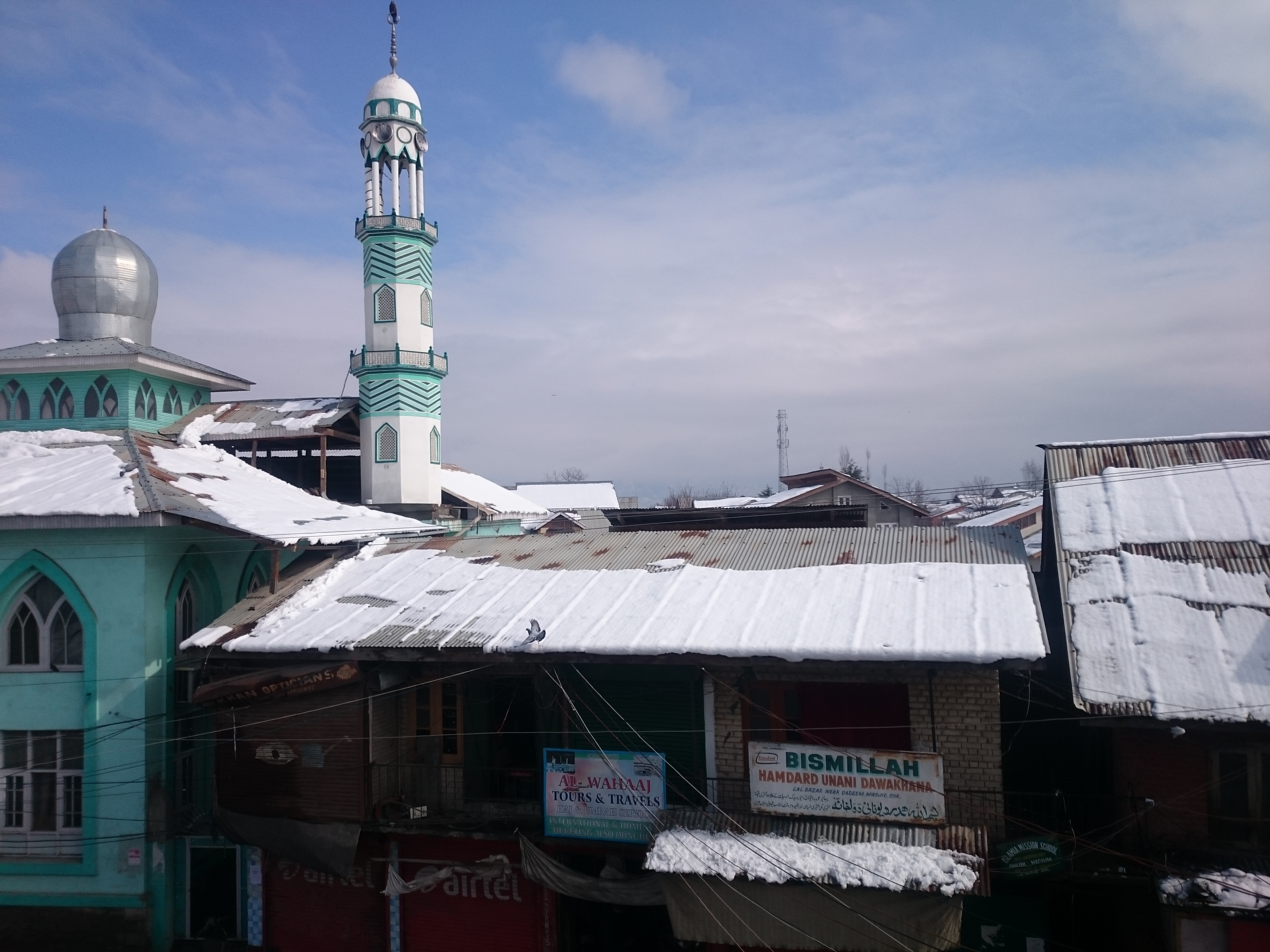
The Minaret of the famous Qadeem Masjid at Lal Bazar after a spell of snow showers in the Valley

Lal Bazar is about 8 kilometres (5.0 mi)way from the city centre of Srinagar.

== Sub Divisions ==
- New Housing Colony Near Police Station
- Umar Colony A - B - C
- Mughal Street
- Molvi Stop
- Kanitar
- Broadway Street
- Rose Lane
- Friends Lane
- Green Lane
- Botshah Mohalla
- Botshah Colony
- Alamdar Colony A & B
- Bota Kadal
- Sikh Bagh
- Bagwanpora
- Sheikh Hamza Colony
- Shoor
- Gousia Colony
- Mughal Lane-Alamdar Colony
- Zari mohalla

== Schools ==
Several prestigious and well known private schools of the city are located in this area.

- G.D. Goenka Public School, Lal Bazar
- Radiant Public School (R.P School), Lal Bazar
- Crescent Public School, Lal Bazar
- Eve's Garden Educational Institute, Lal Bazar
- Green Woods High School, Sikh Bagh - Lal Bazar
- Vision School of Education, Lal Bazar
- The Legends School of Education, Lal Bazar is also located in this area.

== See also ==
- Mughal Road
- Dal Lake
- Hazratbal shrine
- Rajbagh
- Kashmir University
- Srinagar
