= Jammu and Kashmir Board of School Education =

School education board

Coordinates: 34°33′35.5″N 76°7′32.3″E

The Jammu and Kashmir Board of School Education
- JKBOSE
- Abbreviation: JK BOSE
- Formation: 24 March 1965; 61 years ago
- Type: Board of School Education
- Legal status: School Education Board
- Professional title: JKBOSE
- Headquarters: Jammu/ Bemina, Srinagar
- Location: J&K, Ladakh
- Origins: 1965
- Official language: Kashmiri, Hindi, English, Urdu, Bhoti, Balti, Dogri, Gojri, Sheena, Pahari, Punjabi, Persian and Arabic.
- Owner: Government of Jammu and Kashmir
- Minister of School Education: Sakina Itoo
- Chairman: Ghulam Hassan Sheikh
- Secretary: Mr. Ghulam Hassan Sheikh, JKAS [NOW CHAIRMAN]
- Website: jkbose.jk.gov.in jkbose.jk-edu.in jkbose.unaux.com

Jammu and Kashmir Board of School Education (JKBOSE) is the main board of school education in the Union Territories of Jammu and Kashmir. It is based in Jammu & Srinagar and is an autonomous body under the administration of the Government of Jammu and Kashmir. The board gives affiliation to more than 10200 schools across the U.T of Jammu & Kashmir and U.T of Ladakh and employs 22856 teachers. The Jammu and Kashmir Board of School Education was established on 24 March 1965 under the name of “Jammu & Kashmir Board of Secondary Education” under the Act No. II of 1965, which received the assent of the then “ Sadr-i-Riyasat Dr. Karan Singh. Prof. T.M Advani was first Chairman of Jammu & Kashmir Board of Secondary Education from 1965 to 1967. At that time i.e from 1965 to 1975, Vice- Chancellor of University of Jammu & Kashmir was also Chairman of JKBOSE. In 1975, through a legislation under the Jammu and Kashmir State Board of School Education Act, 1975 Jammu & Kashmir Board of Secondary Education renamed as Jammu & Kashmir State Board of School Education with Agha Ashraf Ali as its first independent chairman.

== Composition ==
The Board consists of:

- Chairman, Jammu and Kashmir Board of School Education;
- Administrative Secretary, School Education Department;
- Administrative Secretary, Youth Service and Sports Department;
- Director School Education, Kashmir;
- Director School Education, Jammu;
- Director State Council of Educational Research and Training, Jammu and Kashmir or representative of

National Council of Educational Research and Training to be nominated by the Chairman, National Council of Educational Research and Training;

- Two representatives not below the rank of Head of Departments from Universities and institutes of eminence e.g. Indian Institute of Technology/Indian Institute of Management/All India Institute of Medical Sciences situated in Jammu and Kashmir to be nominated by the Lieutenant Governor of Jammu and Kashmir;
- Two eminent educationist unconnected with the administration, to be nominated by the Lieutenant Governor of Jammu and Kashmir;
- Two officers to be nominated by the Lieutenant Governor from amongst the Principals, Headmasters and Headmistress of teaching institutions of the union territory.

== Major functions ==
The board is empowered to specify the courses of instruction and create syllabi for them, and to select textbooks for the elementary, and secondary schools and for the higher secondary (school gradation) school examinations; to conduct public examinations and publish the results at the secondary school and higher secondary levels; to grant diplomas or certificates to people who have passed its examinations; to recognize educational institutions at the secondary school and higher secondary levels, and conduct inspections of recognized institutions, ensuring that required facilitates, equipment, and staff are in place, that only the approved books and courses are taught, and that the standards are in accord with the relevant regulations; to remove recognition from schools that do not meet the proper conditions; to supervise and control the recognized institutions; and exercise various other powers given to it by law.

== Exams conducted ==
The exams conducted by the Board are:

- Elementary Teacher's Training Institute, Jammu
- Elementary Teacher's Training Institute, Kashmir
- Higher Secondary - Pt II Annual (Pvt) - Jammu Prov.
- Higher Secondary Pt II Annual (Reg.) Jammu Prov.
- Higher Secondary Pt II Annual (Pvt.) Kashmir Prov.
- Higher Secondary Part Two - Kashmir - Annual
- Higher Secondary - Part II Bi-Annual (Pvt)
- Jammu - Annual Private Class X Summer Zone & Winter Zone
- Jammu - Annual Regular Class X
- Leh - Annual Private & Regular Class X
- Leh - Higher Secondary - Part II Annual & Bi-Annual (Reg. & Pvt)
- Leh - Matric Bi-annual - Srinagar
- Kargil - Annual Regular & Private Class X
- Kargil -Higher Secondary - Part II Annual & Bi-Annual (Reg. & Pvt)
- Matric Bi-Annual - Srinagar
- Srinagar - Annual Private Class X

== Divisions and Grading Criteria. ==
=== Class 10: Subject-wise Grading System ===
The Jammu and Kashmir Board of School Education (JKBOSE) uses a detailed subject-wise grading system for Class 10. Grades are assigned based on the percentage of marks obtained in individual subjects. This structure is documented in the official board regulations. Source: JKBOSE Regulations, page 187 point 11 (scheme of examination)

Grade	Description	Percentage Range
A	Excellent	75% and above
B	Very Good	60% to below 74%
C	Good	52% to below 59%
D	Average	45% to below 51%
E	Fair / Satisfactory	33% to below 44%
F	Marginal	15% to below 32%
G	Poor	Below 15%

Marks for Physical and Health Education are recorded numerically, not alphabetically.

Additional confirmation of this grading structure is available from educational platforms such as College dunia

=== Class 10: Aggregate Performance Classification ===
JKBOSE also categorizes students based on their overall aggregate performance.

Source: JKBOSE Regulations, page 195 point (ix)

Divisions	Aggregate Percentage Range
Distinctions	75% and above
Grade I	55% to below 75%
Grade II	33% to below 55%

=== Class 12: Marking and Evaluation System ===
Class 12 results are assessed numerically. JKBOSE does not use letter grades or GPA systems at this level.

Minimum pass marks (as per official marks distribution):

General English: 33%

All other subjects: 36% (with separate pass marks in theory, practical, and aggregate)

Official Source:JKBOSE Marks Distribution PDF Page no. 1

This differs from the Central Board of Secondary Education (CBSE), which includes both letter grades and relative performance bands.

CBSE Grading System for comparison

=== Class 12: Division Classification ===
Class 12 student performance is categorized into divisions according to total aggregate marks.

Official Source: JKBOSE Regulations, page 228-point no.13

Divisions	Aggregate Percentage Range
Distinction	75% and above
First Division	60% to 74.9%
Second Division	48% to 59.9%
Third Division	36% to 47.9%

This system is publicly used in result announcements and covered in the national press:

Indian Express (JKBOSE Class 12 result coverage)

=== Note ===
This section summarizes the officially adopted evaluation structure of JKBOSE for both Class 10 and Class 12. All data is verifiable through official government sources or reputable secondary reporting. The structure presented aligns with standard practice for documenting school board grading systems on Wikipedia.
