= List of colleges in Kashmir division =

There are about 47 Government and 3 Private Grant-in-Aid degree colleges in Kashmir Division, of Indian-administrated union territory of Jammu and Kashmir as per the data available by Jammu and Kashmir Higher Education Department. The colleges in Kashmir province are located in 10 districts. These districts include, Srinagar, Baramulla, Anantnag, Budgam, Kupwara, Pulwama, Ganderbal, Kulgam, Shopian and Bandipora. All the degree colleges of Kashmir Division are affiliated to the University of Kashmir.

== District wise breakup of colleges ==
=== District Srinagar ===
- Sri Pratap College
- Amar Singh College
- Women's College, M.A Road
- Women's College, Nawakadal
- Islamia College of Science &

Commerce, Hawal

- Gandhi Memorial College, Fateh Kadal
- Vishwa Baharti Women's College, Rainawari
- Govt. Degree College, Bemina
- Govt. Degree College, Bagi Dilawar Khan
- Govt. College of Nursing, M A Road Srinagar
- Govt. Degree College, Khanmoh
- Govt. Degree College, Nowgam Byepass
- Govt. Degree College, Hyderpora
- Govt. Degree College, Eidgah
- Govt. Degree College, Allochibagh
- Govt. Degree College, Soura
- Govt. Degree College, Shalimar

=== District Baramulla ===
- Govt. Degree College Boys', Baramulla
- Government College for Women, Baramulla
- Government Degree College Boys, Sopore
- Women's College, Sopore
- Government Degree College, Uri
- Government Degree College, Pattan
- Govt Degree College Hadipora
- Govt. Degree College, Tangmarg
- Govt. Degree College, Kreeri
- Govt. Degree College, Watergam
- Govt. Degree College, Bomai
- Govt. Degree College, Bonier
- Govt. Degree College, Dangiwacha
- Govt. Degree College, Wagoora

=== District Anantnag ===
- Govt. Degree College, Boys Anantnag
- Govt. College for Women, Anantnag
- Government Degree College, Bijbehara
- Govt. Degree College, Dooru
- Govt. Degree College, Uttersoo
- Govt Degree College, Vailoo, Larnoo Anantnag
- Govt Degree College Verinag, Anantnag
- Govt Degree College Siligam(Aushmuqam)Anantnag
- Govt Degree College Chattisinghpora, Anantnag
- Govt Degree College Mattan(East), Anantnag
- Govt Degree College Achabal Anantnag
- Govt Degree College Srigufwara, Anantnag

==== District Budgam ====
- Govt. Sheikh-ul-Alam Memorial College, Budgam
- Govt. Degree College, Chadoora
- Govt. Degree College, Beerwah
- Govt. Degree College, Charar-i-Sharief
- Govt. Degree College, Khansahib
- Govt. Degree College, Magam
- Govt. Degree College, Soibugh
- Govt Degree College Waterhail, Budgam

=== District Kupwara ===
- Govt.Degree College, Boys Kupwara
- Govt.Degree College, Handwara
- Govt. Degree College, Tangdhar
- Govt. Degree College, Sogam
- Govt Degree College Women, Kupwara
- Govt Degree College Langate, Kupwara
- Govt Degree College Kralpora, Kupwara
- Govt Degree College Viligam, Kupwara

=== District Pulwama ===
- Govt. Degree College Boys Pulwama
- Govt. Degree College Women Pulwama
- Govt. Degree College Boys, Tral
- Govt. Degree College Women, Tral
- Govt. Degree College, Pampore
- Govt. Degree College, Rajpora
- Govt. Degree College, Awantipora
- Govt. Degree College, Kakapora

=== District Ganderbal ===
- Government Degree College, Ganderbal
- Govt.Degree College, Kangan
- Govt Degree College, Gund
- Govt Degree College, Wakura

=== District Kulgam ===
- Government Degree College, Kulgam
- Government Degree College, Kelam
- Govt Degree College, Dhamhal
- Govt. Degree college, Frisal
- Govt Degree College, Qazigund
- Govt Degree College, Yaripora

=== District Shopian ===
- Government Degree College, Shopian
- Government Degree College, Zainapora
- Government Degree College, Wachi

=== District Bandipora ===
- Govt. Hassan Khoihame Memorial Degree College, Bandipora
- Govt. Degree College, Gurez
- Govt Degree College, Sumbal
- Govt Degree College, Hajin
- Govt Degree College, Tulail
- Govt Degree College, Ajas
- Govt Degree College, Mujegund
