= List of colleges in Srinagar =

The majority of the colleges in Srinagar are affiliated to the University of Kashmir and are spread throughout the city. Students from different parts of the valley study in these colleges. At the undergraduate level, Bachelor of Arts, Bachelor of Science, and Bachelor of Commerce are the most common courses in these colleges. Along with these conventional courses, many colleges also offer professional courses which concentrate on a specialized field an example of that is National Institute of Technology, Srinagar.

== Colleges in Srinagar ==
The following list of the colleges in Srinagar.

=== Degree colleges and B.Ed colleges ===
- Amar Singh College, Srinagar
- Birla Post Graduate College, Srinagar
- Dr Iqbal Teacher Training College of Education, Srinagar
- Gandhi Memorial College, Srinagar
- Government College for Women, M.A. Road Srinagar
- Govt. Women College, Nawakadal, Srinagar
- Government College of Education, Srinagar
- Government Degree College, Bemina
- Government Degree College of Handware, Srinagar
- Govt Degree College, Bagi Dilawar Khan, Srinagar
- Islamia College of Science and Commerce, Srinagar
- Jamiya-Tul-Banat, Srinagar
- Kamla Nehru Memorial, Maqhavidyala, Srinagar
- MA College of Education, Srinagar
- Qumariya College of Education (QCE), Srinagar
- Ramzan College of Education, Srinagar
- Rizwan Memorial Women's College of Education (RMCE), Srinagar
- Shadab College of Education, Srinagar
- Shanti Niketan College of Education (SNCE), Srinagar
- SM Iqbal College ofducation (SMICE) Rangreth, Srinagar
- SP memorial B.Ed college, Srinagar
- Sri Pratap College, Srinagar
- Vishwa Bharti Women's College, Rainawari Srinagar
- Nund Reshi College of Education(NRC)-Natipora

=== Medical colleges ===
1. Bibi Haleema Nursing College, Srinagar
2. Government Dental College, Srinagar
3. Government Medical College, Srinagar
4. Sher-i-Kashmir Instt. of Medical Sciences, Soura, Srinagar
5. Kashmir Institute of Medical Sciences and Technology, Lawaypora, Srinagar(www.kashmirinstitute.com)

=== Engineering colleges ===
1. National Institute of Technology, Srinagar
2. SSM College of Engineering

=== Design College ===
1. National Institute of Fashion Technology, Srinagar

=== Hotel Management ===
1. Institute of Hotel Management, Srinagar

=== Polytechnic colleges ===
1. Government Polytechnic for Women, Bemina, Srinagar
2. Kashmir Government Polytechnic, Srinagar
3. Kite Polytechnic, Srinagar
4. Royal Polytechnic College, Srinagar

=== Law colleges ===
1. College of Forestry — Srinagar
2. Kashmir Law College Nowshera, Srinagar
3. Vitasta School of Law and Humanities, Srinagar

=== Technical training ===
1. IT Concepts, Srinagar
2. Institute of Music and Fine Arts, Srinagar
3. Industrial Training Institute (ITI), Srinagar

=== Technology and Management ===
1. Iqbal Institute of Technology and Management, Srinagar
2. SM Iqbal Business School SMIBS, Srinagar
3. CASET College of Computer Science, Srinagar
4. DOEACC, Rangreth Srinagar
5. Masterpro Institute of Technology, Srinagar

== See also ==
- List of colleges affiliated to Kashmir University, Kashmir
- Caset College of Computer Science
- List of engineering colleges in Jammu and Kashmir
- SSM College of Engineering, Kashmir
- NIT Srinagar
