= List of colleges affiliated to the University of Kashmir =

The following colleges are affiliated to Kashmir University, Kashmir for all academic purposes. Engineering colleges in the list are also approved by AICTE.

== District Anantnag ==
- Govt. Degree College, Dooru
- Govt. Degree College, Bijbehara
- Govt. Women's College Anantnag
- Govt. Boys College, Anantnag
- Govt. Degree College, Kokernag
- Govt. Degree College, Uttersoo, Anantnag
- Govt Degree College, Vailoo, Larnoo Anantnag

== District Bandipora ==
- Hassan Shah Khoi-e-Hami Memorial
- Govt. Degree College, Bandipora
- Govt. Degree College, Gurez
- Govt Degree College, Sumbal

== District Baramulla ==
- Govt. Degree College Women, Baramulla
- Govt. Degree College Women, Sopore
- Govt. Degree College, Uri
- Govt. Degree College, Pattan
- Govt. Degree College, Sopore
- Govt. Degree College Boys, Baramulla
- Govt Degree College, HadiPora, Rafiabad
- Govt Degree College, Tangmarg, Baramulla
- Govt Degree College, Magam, Tangmarg
- Govt Degree College, Bomai, Sopore

== District Budgam ==
- Govt. Degree College, Budgam
- Govt. Degree College, Beerwah
- Govt. Degree College, Khansahib, Budgam
- Govt. Degree College, Magam
- Govt. Degree College, Chariesharief, Budgam
- Govt. Degree College, Soibug, Budgam
- Govt. Degree College, Chadora, Budgam

== District Gaderbal ==
- Govt. Degree College, Ganderbal
- Govt Degree College, Kangan, Ganderbal

== District Kulgam ==
- Govt. Degree College, Kulgam
- Govt. Degree College, Kelam, Kulgam
- Govt Degree College, Dhamal Hanjipora, Kulgam

== District Kupwara ==
- Govt. Degree College of Handwara
- Govt. Degree College, Kupwara
- Govt. Degree College, Tangdhar
- Govt. Degree College, Sogam,

Kupwara

- Govt Degree College Women, Kupwara

== District Pulwama ==
- Govt. Degree College, Pulwama
- Govt. Degree College, Tral
- Govt. Degree College, Women, Pulwama
- Govt Degree College, Pampore, Pulwama

== District Srinagar ==
- Vishwa Bharti Women's College, Rainawari Srinagar
- Gandhi Memorial College, Srinagar
- Government College for Women, Nawakadal Srinagar
- Govt Degree College, Bagi Dilawar Khan, Srinagar

== District Shopian ==
- Govt. Degree College, Shopian

== District Kargil, Ladakh ==
- Govt. Degree College, Kargil

== District Leh, Ladakh ==
- Govt. Degree College, Leh

== See also ==
- List of colleges affiliated to Jammu University, Jammu
- List of colleges in Srinagar
- List of colleges in Anantnag
- List of engineering colleges in Jammu and Kashmir
- SSM College of Engineering
- NIT Srinagar
