= University of Kashmir Convocation Complex =

Auditorium complex in the University of Kashmir

Kashmir University Convocation Complex
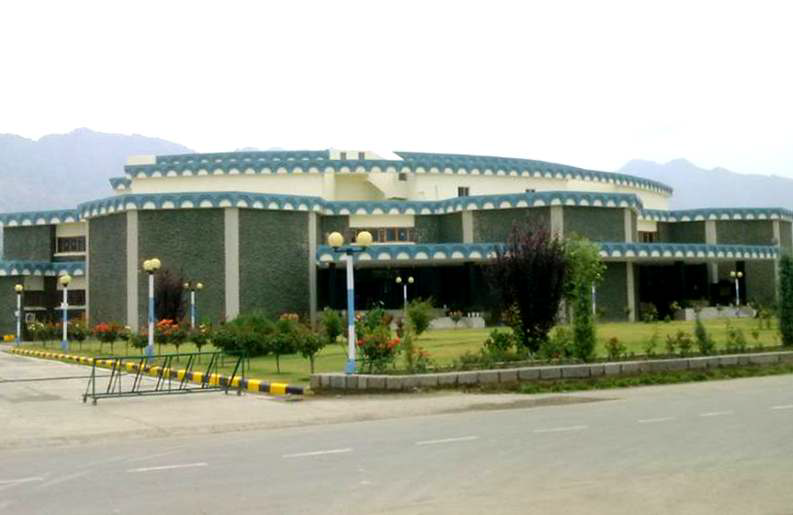
- University Convocation Complex, University of Kashmir
- Interactive map of Kashmir University Convocation Complex
- Address: Hazratbal, Srinagar, Jammu and Kashmir, India
- Location: Hazratbal Campus
- Coordinates: 34°7′46″N 74°50′15.22″E
- Owner: University of Kashmir
- Operator: Directorate of Convocation Complex

Construction
- Built: 1981
- Opened: 7 July 2007
- Cost: ₹ 8 Crores INR

Website
- http://ucc.uok.edu.in

University of Kashmir Convocation Complex is a multi-purpose auditorium complex located inside the main campus of University of Kashmir. It is one of the largest auditorium facilities not only in Jammu and Kashmir, India, but in the whole of North India.

The Complex is spread over an area of 25,000 sq ft and conveniently accessible from two of the gates of University Campus; Sir Syed Gate and Maulana Rumi Gate. It has a seating capacity of 2500 persons.

The Complex was constructed by University Construction Division with assistance from Kadiri Consultants, Mumbai and Construction Engineers, Srinagar.

The first director to head the Directorate of Convocation Complex was Dr. S Mufeed Ahmed of the Business School, University of Kashmir. Dr Nisar Ahmad Mir is currently Director of the Complex.

== History ==
Sensing the need for such a facility, work on the University Convocation Complex commenced on 7 November 1981 when the foundation stone of the multi-Crore project was laid by then Chief Minister of Jammu & Kashmir, Sheikh Mohammad Abdullah. Soon after, the construction work remained suspended for several years due to technical reasons.

Work on the Complex however resumed in February 2004 after a peer team from the National Assessment and Accreditation Council while on an on-site visit suggested that the completion of the Complex be undertaken. The university's Construction Division with the help of Kadiri Consultants, Mumbai and Construction Engineers, Srinagar went on to complete the Complex and it was finally thrown open on 4 July 2007 by Lt Gen (Retd.) S K Sinha, who was then Chancellor of the University of Kashmir.

== Construction ==
Construction of this complex cost ₹ 8 crores.

== Noted visitors to the complex ==
- Former President of India, Pranab Mukherjee
- Former President of India, Pratibha Devisingh Patil
- Vice President of India, Mohammad Hamid Ansari
- Minister of Rural Development, Jairam Ramesh
- Former Chairman of the Prime Minister's Economic Advisory Council, C. Rangarajan
- Former Governor of Jammu and Kashmir, Narinder Nath Vohra
- Former Chief Minister of Jammu and Kashmir, Omar Abdullah
- Former Chief Minister of Jammu and Kashmir, Mufti Muhammad Sayeed
- Jagjit Singh
- A G Noorani

== Directors of the Complex ==
- Prof. Sheikh Mufeed Ahmad (2007 to 2011)
- Dr. Muhammad Shafi Sumbli (2011 to August 2018)
- Mr. Altaf Ahmad Bhat (September 2018 - incumbent)

== See also ==
- University of Kashmir
- Srinagar
- Hazratbal
- Dal Lake
