= Government Degree College, Kupwara =

College in Kupwara, Jammu and Kashmir, India

Government Degree College Kupwara
- Established: 1988
- Academic affiliations: University of Kashmir
- Location: Kupwara, Jammu and Kashmir
- Campus: Rural
- Language: English, Urdu and Kashmiri
- Website: https://www.gdckupwara.edu.in/

The Government Degree College Kupwara is a Govt. run co-educational college located in the Kupwara district in the Indian union territory of Jammu and Kashmir. It is recognized by the University Grants Commission.

== History ==
The college was established in 1988 by Jammu and Kashmir's department of higher education with the aim of opening learning opportunities for the students of Kupwara. The college is affiliated with the University of Kashmir and is recognized by UGC under 2(F) and 12(B) of UGC Act, 1956.

The college started as a makeshift arrangement at Government Higher Secondary School Kupwara and quickly established a temporary campus on the river side of the school. In 2000, the college moved to its present campus, located about 1.5 km from Kupwara town in Bohipora.

== Evaluation ==
It has been awarded grade "A" by NAAC.

== Location ==
The college is located about 97 km from Srinagar. It is about 1.5 km from Kupwara town center in Bohipora on Kupwara-Gushi road.

== Courses ==
The college offers bachelor's degrees in various subjects like Arts, Science, Commerce and Computer Science; in addition, there are several add-on courses available.

=== Bachelors degrees ===
- Bachelor of Arts (BA)
- Bachelor of Science (Medical)
- Bachelor of Science (Non Medical)
- Bachelor of Commerce (B.Com)
- Bachelor of Computer Applications (BCA)

=== Other courses ===
- Computer Applications
- Data Care Management
- Lab Techniques
- Sericulture Management

== Recognition ==
The college was the first among valley colleges to get a NAAC RE Accreditation grade A in 2022 With CGPA 3.15.
