= List of engineering colleges in Jammu and Kashmir =

There are many technical colleges in Jammu and Kashmir listed by division north to south. They are affiliated to State Universities such as the University of Kashmir and University of Jammu along with other universities such as Baba Ghulam Shah Badshah University and Islamic University of Science and Technology. Engineering colleges listed below are accredited by All India Council for Technical Education.

== Kashmir Division ==
=== Baramulla district ===
==== SSM College of Engineering ====
SSM College of Engineering is in Pattan, Baramulla and is affiliated to University of Kashmir for academic purposes. The engineering disciplines are Civil engineering, Electrical engineering, Electronics & Communication engineering, Mechanical engineering, Computer Science and Engineering.

=== Ganderbal district ===
==== GCET Ganderbal Kashmir ====
Engineering College in Safapora, Ganderbal.

=== Srinagar district ===
==== National Institute of Technology, Srinagar ====
The National Institute of Technology, Srinagar is a national engineering institute located in Hazratbal, Srinagar.

- Departments

Bachelor of Technology
Chemical Engineering
Civil Engineering
Computer Science and Engineering
Electrical Engineering
Electronics and Communication Engineering
Information Technology
Mechanical Engineering
Metallurgical & Materials Engineering (Formerly Metallurgical Engineering)
Master of Technology
Structural Engineering
Water Resources Engineering
Communication and Information Technology
Electrical Power and Energy System
Industrial Tribology and Maintenance Management
Mechanical System Design
Arts and Science
Humanities
Chemistry
Physics
Mathematics

==== University of Kashmir (North Campus), (South Campus) & (Zakura Campus a.k.a. Institute of Technology) ====
Affiliated to University of Kashmir, it has two campuses

- North Campus at Delina in Baramulla: offers Bachelor of Technology (B.TECH) degree in Computer Science & Engineering while Zakura Campus offers Bachelors of Technology (B.TECH) in Electronics and Communication Engineering, Civil Engineering, Electrical and Electronics Engineering and Mechanical Engineering.
- South Campus or main campus at Zakura Campus in Hazratbal in Srinagar: offers courses leading to Masters of Technology (M.Tech.) in Computer Science and Embedded Systems.

Kashmir College of Engineering and Technology, Srinagar

Kashmir College of Engineering and Technology is also affiliated to University of Kashmir, Srinagar. The engineering courses are Artificial Intelligence, Mechanical Engineering, Civil Engineering, Electronics and Communication and Computer Science.

== Jammu Division ==
=== Rajouri district ===
==== College of Engineering and Technology, Baba Ghulam Shah Badshah University, Rajouri ====
Baba Ghulam Shah Badshah University is located in Rajouri. It came into existence by an Act of the Jammu and Kashmir Legislative Assembly in 2002. The engineering college offers B.tech degrees in Civil, Computer Science, Electrical and Renewable Energy, Electronics and Communication and Information Technology.

=== Reasi district ===
==== College of Engineering, Shri Mata Vaishno Devi University, Katra ====
Shri Mata Vaishno Devi University is located in Katra. It provides engineering degrees in Computer Science, Electronics and Communication, Mechanical, Biotechnology, Architecture & Landscape Design and Energy Management.

=== Jammu district ===
==== Indian Institute of Technology, Jammu ====
The Indian Institute of Technology Jammu (abbreviated IIT Jammu) is a public research university located in Jammu. The Institute opened in 2016 when a Memorandum of Understanding between the Department of Higher Education, J&K and Department of Higher Education, MHRD, was signed. The institute offers five B.tech programs: computer science, electrical, mechanical, civil and chemical enrolling 30 in each. The admission to these programs is done through JEE-Advanced.

==== Model Institute of Engineering and Technology, Jammu ====
Model Institute of Engineering and Technology is a technical institute located in Bantalab, Jammu. It offers undergraduate degrees in engineering trades and a master's degrees in computer engineering.

| Trade | Seats |
|---|---|
| Electrical Engineering | 60 |
| Information Technology | 60 |
| Electronics and Communication Engineering | 120 |
| Computer Science and Engineering | 120 |
| Civil Engineering | 60 |
| M.tech Computer Science and engineering | 18 |

==== MBS College of Engineering & Technology, Digaina ====
The college is affiliated to Jammu University for academic purposes. Engineering degrees include Applied Electronics and Instrumentation, Computer, Electrical, Electronics and Communication, Information Technology and Mechanical.

==== Government College of Engineering and Technology, Jammu ====
The Government College of Engineering and Technology, Jammu (GCET, Jammu) is an engineering institute located in Jammu. It offers Bachelor of Engineering (BE) degrees in Computer Sciences, Electronics and Communication, Mechanical, Civil and Electrical. It was established in 1994 and is the first engineering college in the Jammu region.

==== Yogananda College of Engineering and Technology ====
Yogananda College of Engineering and Technology is located in Muthi. The college offers engineering courses in Electrical, Civil, Computer Science, Mechanical and Information technology.

=== Samba district ===
==== Bhargava College of Engineering and Technology ====
Bhargava College of Engineering and Technology is an engineering college located in Samba. This college is approved by AICET and affiliated to University of Jammu. It offers a Bachelor of Engineering degree in civil, mechanical, electrical, electronics and communication and computer science. It was established in 2015.

== See also ==
- List of colleges affiliated to Kashmir University, Kashmir
- List of colleges affiliated to Jammu University, Jammu
