= Cluster University of Srinagar =

State university in Srinagar, India

- کلسٹر یونیورسٹی سری نگر
- Motto: Knowledge Enlightens
- Type: State university
- Established: 2016; 10 years ago
- Parent institution: Government of Jammu and Kashmir
- Affiliations: UGC
- Chancellor: Lieutenant Governor of Jammu and Kashmir
- Vice-Chancellor: Dr. Mohammad Mobin
- Students: 15000+
- Location: Wazir Bagh, Srinagar, Jammu and Kashmir, India; 34°03′39″N 74°48′21″E
- Campus: 108 acres (44 ha); Urban
- Website: www.cusrinagar.edu.in

Cluster University of Srinagar (C-U, CUS) is a collegiate state university located in Wazir Bagh Srinagar, Jammu and Kashmir, India. It is a cluster of five colleges in Srinagar city. It has been established under the Srinagar and Jammu Cluster Universities Act, 2016, together with Cluster University of Jammu, and is an initiative of the centrally sponsored scheme, Rashtriya Uchchatar Shiksha Abhiyan (RUSA), to create new universities through the upgradation of existing colleges and the conversion of colleges in a cluster.

== Constituent colleges ==
The five constituent colleges of the university are Amar Singh College, Sri Pratap College, Government College for Women, M.A. Road, Srinagar, Abdul Ahad Azad College, Bemina, and The Institute of Advanced Studies in Education, Srinagar.

== Courses offered ==
Abdul Ahad Azad Memorial Degree College ( School of Social Sciences (SSS) )	Political Science	10 Semesters	30	10	40
Abdul Ahad Azad Memorial Degree College ( School of Social Sciences (SSS) )	Business Management (BBA / MBA)	10 Semesters	30	10	40
Abdul Ahad Azad Memorial Degree College ( School of Social Sciences (SSS) )	History	10 Semesters	30	10	40
Abdul Ahad Azad Memorial Degree College ( School of Social Sciences (SSS) )	Commerce	10 Semesters	30	10	40
Abdul Ahad Azad Memorial Degree College ( School of Social Sciences (SSS) )	Professional Courses				
Abdul Ahad Azad Memorial Degree College ( School of Social Sciences (SSS) )	Bachelor of Business Administration (BBA)	6 Semesters	60	0	60
Abdul Ahad Azad Memorial Degree College ( School of Social Sciences (SSS) )	Honor's Courses				
Abdul Ahad Azad Memorial Degree College ( School of Social Sciences (SSS) )	Political Science	6 Semesters	40	0	40
Abdul Ahad Azad Memorial Degree College ( School of Social Sciences (SSS) )	History	6 Semesters	40	0	40
Abdul Ahad Azad Memorial Degree College ( School of Social Sciences (SSS) )	Commerce	6 Semesters	40	0	40
	Integrated Courses				
Amar Singh College ( School of Humanities and Liberal Arts (SHA) )	Economics	10 Semesters	30	10	40
Amar Singh College ( School of Humanities and Liberal Arts (SHA) )	Geography	10 Semesters	30	0	30
Amar Singh College ( School of Humanities and Liberal Arts (SHA) )	English	10 Semesters	30	10	40
Amar Singh College ( School of Humanities and Liberal Arts (SHA) )	Professional Courses				
Amar Singh College ( School of Humanities and Liberal Arts (SHA) )	Bachelor of Computer Applications (BCA)	6 Semesters	60	0	60
Amar Singh College ( School of Humanities and Liberal Arts (SHA) )	Honor's Courses				
Amar Singh College ( School of Humanities and Liberal Arts (SHA) )	History	6 Semesters	40	0	40
Amar Singh College ( School of Humanities and Liberal Arts (SHA) )	Geography	6 Semesters	40	0	40
Amar Singh College ( School of Humanities and Liberal Arts (SHA) )	English	6 Semesters	40	0	40
Amar Singh College ( School of Humanities and Liberal Arts (SHA) )	Commerce	6 Semesters	40	0	40
Amar Singh College ( School of Humanities and Liberal Arts (SHA) )	Economics	6 Semesters	40	0	40
	Integrated Courses				
Govt College For Women ( School of Engineering & Technology (SET) )	Computer Applications (BCA / MCA)	10 Semesters	30	10	40
Govt College For Women ( School of Engineering & Technology (SET) )	Journalism & Mass Communication	10 Semesters	30	10	40
Govt College For Women ( School of Engineering & Technology (SET) )	Professional Courses				
Govt College For Women ( School of Engineering & Technology (SET) )	Bachelor of Computer Applications (BCA)	6 Semesters	60	0	60
Govt College For Women ( School of Engineering & Technology (SET) )	Honor's Courses				
Govt College For Women ( School of Engineering & Technology (SET) )	English	6 Semesters	40	0	40
Govt College For Women ( School of Engineering & Technology (SET) )	Journalism & Mass Communication	6 Semesters	40	0	40
	B.Tech Courses				
Govt. College for Engineering and Technology ( School of Engineering & Technology (SET) )	Electronics and Communication Engineering	8 Semesters	56	10	66
Govt. College for Engineering and Technology ( School of Engineering & Technology (SET) )	Bio-Medical Engineering	8 Semesters	56	10	66
Govt. College for Engineering and Technology ( School of Engineering & Technology (SET) )	Electrical and Electronics Engineering	8 Semesters	56	10	66
Govt. College for Engineering and Technology ( School of Engineering & Technology (SET) )	Electrical Engineering	8 Semesters	56	10	66
Govt. College for Engineering and Technology ( School of Engineering & Technology (SET) )	Mechanical Engineering	8 Semesters	56	10	66
Govt. College for Engineering and Technology ( School of Engineering & Technology (SET) )	Civil Engineering	8 Semesters	56	10	66
Govt. College for Engineering and Technology ( School of Engineering & Technology (SET) )	Computer Science and Engineering	8 Semesters	56	10	66
	Integrated Courses				
Institute of Advanced Studies in Education ( School of Education (STE) )	B.Ed-M.Ed	10 Semesters	40	12	52
Institute of Advanced Studies in Education ( School of Education (STE) )	B.Ed & M.Ed. Courses				
Institute of Advanced Studies in Education ( School of Education (STE) )	B.Ed	4 Semesters	200	100	300
Institute of Advanced Studies in Education ( School of Education (STE) )	M.Ed	4 Semesters	80	24	104
Institute of Advanced Studies in Education ( School of Education (STE) )		Integrated Courses			
Sri Pratap College ( School of Sciences (SSC) )	Chemistry	10 Semesters	30	10	40
Sri Pratap College ( School of Sciences (SSC) )	Botany	10 Semesters	30	10	40
Sri Pratap College ( School of Sciences (SSC) )	Bio-Chemistry	10 Semesters	30	10	40
Sri Pratap College ( School of Sciences (SSC) )	Environmental Science	10 Semesters	30	10	40
Sri Pratap College ( School of Sciences (SSC) )	Information Technology	10 Semesters	30	10	40
Sri Pratap College ( School of Sciences (SSC) )	Physics	10 Semesters	30	10	40
Sri Pratap College ( School of Sciences (SSC) )	Geography	10 Semesters	30	10	40
Sri Pratap College ( School of Sciences (SSC) )	Zoology	10 Semesters	30	10	40
Sri Pratap College ( School of Sciences (SSC) )	Honor's Courses				
Sri Pratap College ( School of Sciences (SSC) )	Botany	6 Semesters	40	0	40
Sri Pratap College ( School of Sciences (SSC) )	Bio-Chemistry	6 Semesters	40	0	40
Sri Pratap College ( School of Sciences (SSC) )	Geography	6 Semesters	40	0	40
Sri Pratap College ( School of Sciences (SSC) )	Chemistry	6 Semesters	40	0	40
Sri Pratap College ( School of Sciences (SSC) )	Physics	6 Semesters	40	0	40
Sri Pratap College ( School of Sciences (SSC) )	Zoology	6 Semesters	40	0	40
Sri Pratap College ( School of Sciences (SSC) )	Environmental Science	6 Semesters	40	0	40
Sri Pratap College ( School of Sciences (SSC) )	Information Technology	6 Semesters	40	0	40

== Academics ==
Cluster University of Srinagar offers a variety of undergraduate, postgraduate, and integrated programs in arts, science, commerce, and professional fields. The university provides 5-year integrated courses in Political Science, BBA+MBA, and History, along with 3-year degree programs like BA (English, Journalism), BSc (Medical/Non-Medical), BCom, and BCA. For postgraduate studies, options include MA (English, History), MSc (IT), and MCA. These courses are spread across different schools such as Social Sciences, Humanities & Liberal Arts, Sciences, Engineering & Technology, and Education.

== Campus ==
The university's five campuses are spread over 108 acres (44 ha). The infrastructure development is funded through the Rashtriya Uchchatar Shiksha Abhiyan (RUSA).

== See also ==
- University of Kashmir
- Central University of Kashmir
- S.P. College, Srinagar
- Amar Singh College, Srinagar
- Law Society, Central University of Kashmir
- GDC Bemina
