= Government Degree College, Budgam =

Government college in Budgam district of Jammu and Kashmir, India

Sheikh-ul-Aalam Memorial Degree College, Budgam
- Type: Undergraduate College
- Established: 2005 (21 years ago)
- Affiliations: University of Kashmir
- Principal: Prof. Mohd Amin Malik
- Location: Budgam, Jammu and Kashmir, India; 34.027394°N 74.717354°E
- Campus: Rural
- Website: www.samdc.edu.in
- Location in Jammu and Kashmir Government Degree College, Budgam (India)

Government Degree College Budgam also known as Sheikh-ul-Alam Memorial Degree College Budgam, SAM College Budgam, is University of Kashmir affiliated autonomous co-educational degree college, located at district headquarter Budgam in the Indian union territory of Jammu and Kashmir.The college was founded in the year 2005 and is recognised by University Grants Commission of Indian under section 2(f) and (12b) of UGC Act, 1956.The College has started receiving grants from the UGC under various developmental schemes of academic and infrastructural nature. Prof. Mohd Amin Malik Joined as the principal of The College on 6 December 2024.

== Location ==
The College is situated at Budgam, one of the oldest districts headquarter in the Indian administered union territory of Jammu and Kashmir. It is located at a distance of about 16 km from the summer capital of Srinagar. The college is located on a hill under the lap of nature with a picturesque view overlooking the Budgam town. The college is the first institution of Higher Education in Budgam district. Currently Mohd Amin Malik is the principal of the college.

== Establishment ==
Government of Jammu and Kashmir established the college during the Chief-Ministership of Mufti Mohammad Sayeed in the year 2005 under Prime Minister of India's Reconstruction plan. The college started its first academic session in the same year with just 33 students. It started its academic operations from Govt. Higher Secondary School Budgam. The present campus of college is functioning since July 2009. It is also called Sheikh-ul-Alam Memorial College named after the famous Reshi saint of Kashmir, Sheikh Noor Din Wali.

== Courses offered ==
The college offers bachelor courses in Arts and Science streams.

=== Bachelor courses ===
- Bachelors in commerce
- Bachelors in Arts
- Bachelor of Honors in Anthropology
- Bachelors in Science (Medical)
- Bachelors in Science (Non-Medical)
- Bachelors in Computer Application

== Auditorium Hall ==
There is an Auditorium Hall in the college. Every Friday there is an arranged program for students on Higher education, Business education, skill development etc. The hall has a capacity of more than 500 hundred students.

== Alumni ==
Some prominent personalities in the Valley are alumni of the College. Aga Syed Ruhullah, parliament member for the Srinagar Parliamentary Constituency is an alumnus of the college.
