= Govt. MAM PG College, Jammu =

Govt. MAM PG College Jammu
- Parent institution: Cluster University of Jammu
- Affiliations: Cluster University of Jammu
- Principal: Prof. Archana Kaul
- Location: Jammu
- Campus: Dr. Ambedkar Road, Jammu - 180006
- Website: www.mamcollegejammu.org

Govt. Maulana Azad Memorial, Post Graduate College, Jammu generally known as the Govt. MAM P.G College is affiliated to the Cluster University of Jammu in the Indian union territory of Jammu and Kashmir. The College largely caters to the need of the students studying various subjects of Arts but has lately started Science and management courses including but not limited to Bachelors in Computer Applications and Bachelors in Business Administration. Besides graduate courses, Post Graduation courses in the subject of Mathematics was started in the year 2003. Accredited B+ by the National Assessment and Accreditation Council, the College is at par with other colleges of repute in the country. The college boasts of alumni ranging from judges to police officers, bureaucrats, political leaders and industrialists.

== History ==
The college started as the erstwhile Prince of Wales College on 23 April 1907. After Independence of the country the college was renamed as Govt. Gandhi Memorial College, Jammu on 4 June 1948. To meet the need of growing number of students, this college was bifurcated into Arts and Science Colleges on 20 September 1954. Govt. Gandhi Memorial Arts College was shifted to its new premises on 23 September 1960 and was renamed as Govt. Maulana Azad Memorial College in the memory of the inaugural education minister of the country Maulana Abul Kalam Azad. Initially only Arts subjects were introduced. Later on science subjects including physics, chemistry, geography, geology and electronics were inducted in a phased manner. Post-graduation in mathematics has been introduced since 2003, BCA since 2009 and BBA since 2010.

The College building has an imposed "facade" evenly balanced right and left wings emanating from the central dome - capped entrance which bears a faint resemblance to the Gothic architecture. A science block, Earth scienceblock, a canteen complex with RECREATION hall, a hostel block and a new Library block stand apart from the main structure. A few Chinar trees, a rarity in this region, cover the foreground. Majestically tall Eucalyptus trees, standing as sentinels on either side of the approach road, offer a guard of honour to all and sundry high and low. The college is affiliated to the University of Jammu and is recognized under sec 2f and 12 B of the UGC Act 1956.

The Govt. M.A.M College had Camp / Evening shift which came into being from the session 1990-91 to facilitate the academic courses of migrant students who migrated to Jammu from the valley till 2011.

== Location ==
The topography of the College is exquisite as it is opposite to the University of Jammu on the bank of the river Tawi River and majestic Bahu fort in the back drop of Trikuta Hills overlooking it.

== College Description ==
The College has Twenty separate departments including BBA and BCA functioning and One PG Mathematics Dept. A beautiful dome at the top of main building adds a feather to the beautification of the institution. The back of the main building has a separate canteen for the students. The Earth Sciences block has two departments – Geography and Geology, having separate laboratories. The science block has three departments of Physics, Chemistry and Electronics. All these departments have separate laboratories and class rooms. The college has a separate hall for indoor activities with the seating capacity of 300 and very soon a big auditorium. The Principal, the administrative head of the institute has his office in a separate building known as the Administrative Block. The block has IQAC and offices for support staff of the college. This block is situated on the left side of the main building. The butterfly shaped college library has at present a collection of about 60,000 books. There is a reading room attached to the college library. About 100 different magazines, newspapers and journals are subscribed by the college. The college library is very well equipped with the facilities like Xerox copier, internet facility available for the convenience of the students. Besides, the services of N.S.S. volunteers are also utilized for inculcating the habit of cleanliness amongst the students. The college functions to impart education to a maximum number of students. The college also acts up as an IGNOU study Eye with more than 1200 students on roll for various commensurateness courses like Bachelor preparatory programme, B.A., B.Com. and BSc, Certificate programme in laboratory techniques, Certificate programme in the teaching of primary school mathematics.

College offers about 27 different subjects and 47 different combinations at the under graduate level provides a host of amenities like common room for girl students.

== See also ==
- University of Jammu
