= Government Degree College, Tral =

College in Jammu and Kashmir, India

Government Degree College Tral
- The Principal, The Dean, The Scholars And The Students Of Degree College At Tral
- Motto: من الظلامت إلى النور
- Type: Govt
- Established: 1988
- Affiliations: University of Kashmir
- Vice-Chancellor: Prof. Nilofer Khan
- Principal: Prof. (Dr.) Mushtaq Ahmad Malik
- Location: Tral, Jammu and Kashmir, India
- Campus: Rural
- Language: Koshur, Urdu and English
- Website: www.gdctral.ac.in

Government Degree College Tral also known as GDC Tral, is a University of Kashmir-affiliated co-educational degree college located at Tral in Pulwama district of the Indian union territory of Jammu and Kashmir. It is a University Grants Commission autonomous college recognised by UGC under 2(f) and 12(b) of UGC Act 1956.

== History ==
Department of higher education, Govt. of Jammu and Kashmir established the college under the chief-Ministership of Dr. Farooq Abdullah in the year 1988.

== Location ==
GDC Tral is 43 km (27 mi) south from state summer capital Srinagar. GDC Tral is located around three km (1.9 mi) from main Tral town in the Bajwani area. GDC Tral is located in a vast area spread over many acres of land.

== History and Milestones ==
Government Degree College (GDC), Tral has undergone significant developmental phases since its inception to become a key hub for higher education in the Pulwama district.

- 1988: Foundation – The college was established by the Government of Jammu & Kashmir during the administration of then-Chief Minister Farooq Abdullah. It was created to provide accessible higher education to the rural and semi-urban population of the Tral sub-district.
- 2006: Expansion of Distance Education – To cater to students unable to attend regular classes, the college became a registered study centre for Indira Gandhi National Open University (IGNOU). This allowed for the introduction of postgraduate courses in various disciplines.
- 2015: NAAC Accreditation – The college achieved a major quality benchmark by undergoing its first cycle of assessment by the National Assessment and Accreditation Council (NAAC), which validated its academic and administrative standards.
- 2020: Digital Transformation – Under the "Digital India" initiative, the institution modernized its infrastructure, launching a "Digital Campus" featuring smart classrooms and an automated library system to facilitate remote learning during the COVID-19 pandemic.
- 2022–2024: NEP Implementation – The college formally adopted the National Education Policy 2020 (NEP 2020), transitioning to a multidisciplinary four-year undergraduate framework with a focus on vocational courses like Mushroom Science and Veterinary Technology.

== Courses offered ==
The college offers bachelor degrees in three streams: science, arts and commerce.

- Bachelor of Arts
- Bachelor of Science (Medical)
- Bachelor of Science (Non Medical)
- Bachelor of Commerce
- Bachelor of computer applications
