= Ayub Thakur =

Kashmiri political activist and founder of London-based World Kashmir Freedom Movement

Ayyub Thakur
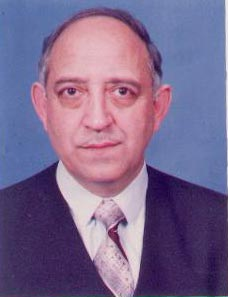
- Born: 1948; Shopian, Jammu and Kashmir, India
- Died: March 10, 2004 (aged 55–56); London, United Kingdom
- Education: University of Kashmir (PhD in Nuclear Physics)
- Organization(s): World Kashmir Freedom Movement, Justice Foundation, Mercy Universal
- Movement: Jammu and Kashmir insurgency
- Children: Muzzammil Ayyub Thakur

Muhammad Ayyub Thakur (1948 – 10 March 2004) was a political activist and founder of London-based World Kashmir Freedom Movement (WKFM). He also founded a charity organization called 'Mercy Universal'. In 2011, according to a report by The Telegraph, It was a front group for Pakistan's Inter-Services Intelligence (ISI). After investigatation by the British Charity Commission, Scotland Yard and the FBI, it was stated that his organization had direct contacts with Hizbul Mujahideen, an EU-Sanctioned insurgent organization.

In 2001, Indian Government had booked him under Terrorist and Disruptive Activities (Prevention) Act for providing financing & logistical support to terrorists.

His son Muzammil Ayub Thakur is an active representative member of the UK based NGO

== Early life ==
Thakur was born in 1948 in a farming family in Pudsoo village in district Shopian in Jammu and Kashmir. He was the eldest of four children. Thakur obtained his Doctorate (Phd.) in Nuclear Physics from the University of Kashmir.

== Career ==
In 1978, after a brief stint at the Bhaba Atomic Research Centre (Zakoora, Srinagar), he became lecturer in the Department of Physics in the University of Kashmir. He had a keen interest in the social and political issues of Jammu and Kashmir.

After becoming lecturer at the University of Kashmir he intensified his subversive political activities. He began organising protests. In August 1980, he and many of his colleagues at university and students organisation, Islami Jamiat-i-Talaba, organised an international conference on the issue of right of self-determination of Kashmiris. the government banned the conference, dismissed Thakur from his job as a university lecturer, and later imprisoned him along with his colleagues under Public Safety Act (PSA).

In 1981, Thakur joined the Nuclear Engineering Department of King Abdulaziz University, Jeddah in Saudi Arabia as a lecturer.

== World Kashmir Freedom Movement ==
WKFM, along with other two organisations founded by Thakur were investigated by Scotland Yard, the Charity Commission and FBI for ties to the Pakistan Military and Militant groups active in Jammu and Kashmir. The outcome of these investigations were unable to implicate any ties to ISI for funding these organizations.

== Impounding of Indian Passport and demand for extradition ==
Upon the revelation of his ties to militant groups, Indian government twice sought his extradition from the UK in 1992 and 1993. After its failure, they finally impounded his passport in 1993. Thakur subsequently obtained British travel papers which he used until his death in 2004.

During the visit of British Home Secretary Jack Straw to India in May 2002, Indian Deputy Prime Minister, LK Advani again demanded extradition of thakur citing him being accused of providing funds to the terrorists in Jammu and Kashmir. Advani also demanded the arrest of Thakur under the UK's New anti-terrorist laws.

== Family Members Allegedly Harassed ==
Ayub regularly claimed that his family members, relatives and friends were subjected to house raids, torture and harassment by the Indian army [citation needed]. He often claimed that his ancestral home in Kashmir was raided many a time and his parents threatened.

== Death ==
Thakur died at the age of 55, in London on 10 March 2004 after an illness. He was suffering from pulmonary fibrosis. His funeral was held at the London Central Mosque, Regent Park, and he was laid to rest at the Garden of Peace, in Greenford, West London, close to where he had been living for many years. The Indian Government, having stripped him of his citizenship in 1993, dismissed a request by his family that he be buried in Jammu and Kashmir. He is survived by his wife, a son and two daughters.

== See also ==
- Syed Ali Shah Geelani
- Islamic Jihad
- Insurgency in Jammu and Kashmir
