= Cluster University of Jammu =

Collegiate public state university in India

Coordinates: 32.7249°N 74.8521°E

- Type: State university
- Established: 2016; 10 years ago
- Chancellor: Lieutenant Governor of Jammu and Kashmir
- Vice-Chancellor: K. S. Chandrasekar
- Location: Jammu, Jammu and Kashmir, India
- Campus: Urban
- Website: www.clujammu.ac.in

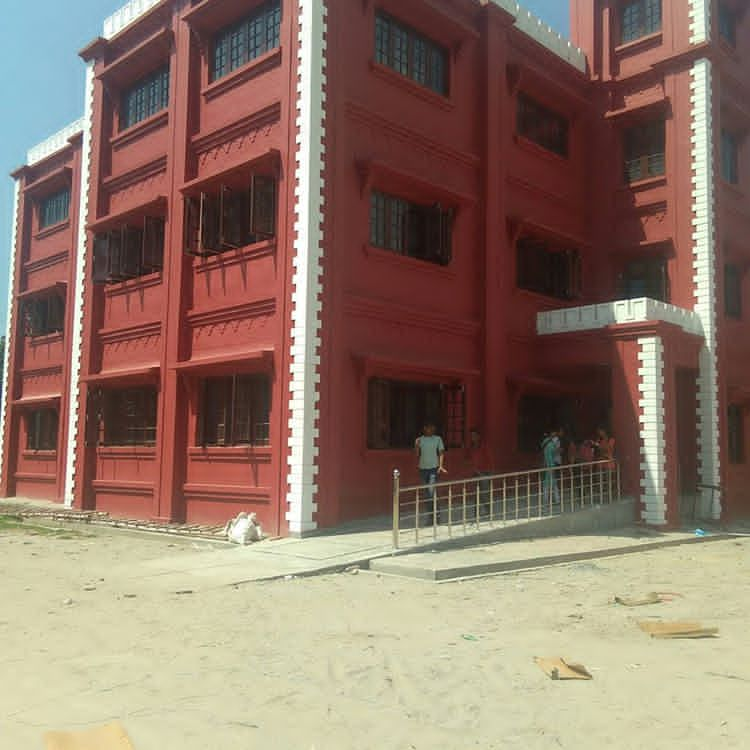
CLU Jammu GGM Science college Campus

The Cluster University of Jammu (CLUJ) is a collegiate public state university, located in Jammu in the union territory of Jammu and Kashmir, India. It is a cluster of five colleges of the Jammu city and five Schools. It was established in 2016 under The Srinagar and Jammu Cluster Universities Act, 2016 together with Cluster University of Srinagar under the initiative of the centrally sponsored scheme, RUSA. Cluster University of Jammu along with Cluster University of Srinagar was inaugurated by Prakash Javadekar, then Minister of HRD, Government of India on 17 April 2017.

== University Profile ==
The Cluster University of Jammu came into existence on 1 March 2017, with the appointment of the first Vice-Chancellor, Prof. Anju Bhasin. It was established by The Srinagar and Jammu Cluster Universities Act, 2016 (Act No. III of 2016). As a collegiate university, its main functions are divided between the schools of university and constituent colleges.

The first academic session (2017-2018) commenced with 10 undergraduate courses, 8 postgraduate courses and 8 integrated courses in various subjects.

== Schools of University ==
The University includes 5 schools, namely Sciences, Humanities and Liberal Arts, Social Sciences, Teacher Education and Engineering & Computer Technology.

== Constituent colleges ==
The university includes five constituent colleges, namely Govt. Gandhi Memorial Science College (as a lead college), Govt. MAM PG College, Jammu, Govt. S.P.M.R College of Commerce, Government College for Women Gandhi Nagar and Government College of Education Canal Road.

== Academics ==
The university currently offers 12 undergraduate courses, 8 postgraduate courses and 12 integrated courses in various humanities, sciences, and commerce subjects. Admission to the various courses is made on the basis of CUET UG.

== See also ==
- Cluster University of Srinagar
