= List of colleges in Anantnag =

This is a list of colleges in Anantnag, Jammu and Kashmir.

== Medical College ==
- Government Medical College, Anantnag.

== Degree colleges and B.Ed colleges ==
- Government College for Women, Anantnag.
- Government Degree College, Uttersoo.
- Government Degree College for Boys, Anantnag
- Government Degree College, Bijbehara.
- Government Degree College, Larnoo
- Government Degree College, Kokernag
- Government Degree College, Doru
