= Naseem Bagh =

Garden in Srinagar, India

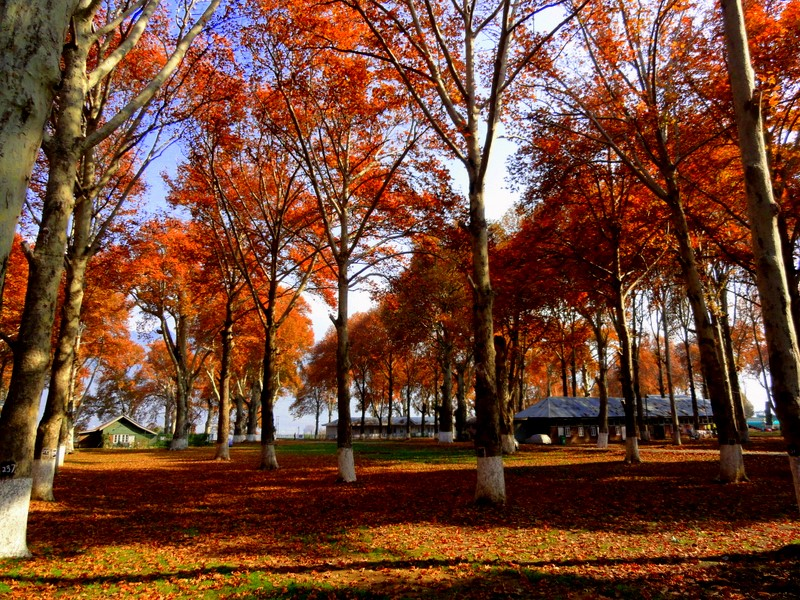
- Naseem Bagh
- Interactive map of Naseem Bagh
- Type: Mughal garden
- Location: Srinagar, J&K, India
- Coordinates: 34°08′17″N 74°50′17″E
- Area: 25 hectares (62 acres)
- Opened: 1586 A.D.
- Founder: Akbar
- Owner: Jammu and Kashmir Tourism Department
- Operator: Jammu and Kashmir Tourism Department
- Plants: Platanus orientalis (Chinars)

Naseem Bagh is a Mughal garden built on the northwestern side of the Dal Lake, close to the city of Srinagar in Jammu and Kashmir, India.

The garden is one of the oldest Mughal gardens in Kashmir, built by Mughal emperor Akbar in 1586. Over 1,200 chinar trees were planted in 1686 by Shah Jahan. Now owned by the Jammu and Kashmir Tourism Department, it is developed as Chinar Heritage Park by the University of Kashmir. At present the park houses around 700 chinar trees. It is mostly visited in the autumn from September to December.

== See also ==
- Foreshore Road
- Indo-Islamic Architecture
- Dal Lake
- Shalimar Bagh (Srinagar)
- Hazratbal
