= Amar Singh College =

College in Srinagar, Jammu and Kashmir, India

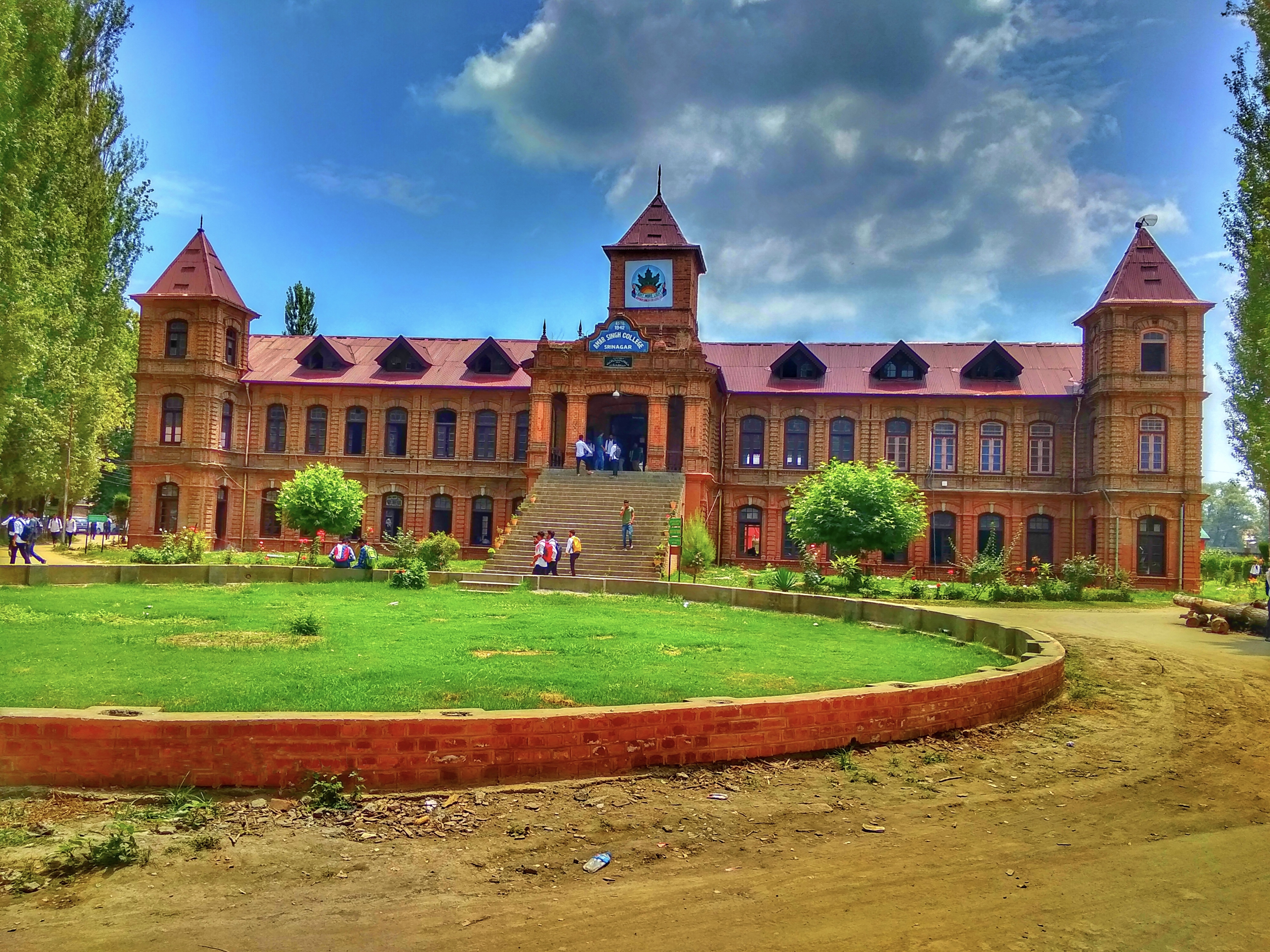
- Front view of Amar Singh College in 2021
- Motto in English: Light More Light
- Type: Education
- Established: 1913 (113 years ago)
- Affiliations: Kashmir University; Cluster University of Srinagar
- Principal: Prof.(Dr.) Tehmina Yousuf
- Location: Wazir Bagh, Srinagar, Jammu and Kashmir, India; 34.03°N 74.48°E
- Campus: 35 hectares (86 acres); Urban
- Website: https://www.amarsinghcollege.ac.in/

- Location in Jammu & Kashmir, India Amar Singh College (India)

Amar Singh College, is an academic and professional college in Srinagar, Jammu and Kashmir, India. It is the second oldest college in the Kashmir Valley after Sri Pratap College.

== History ==
It was established in November 1913 as Amar Singh Technical Institute, to teach willing students art, culture, and basics like masonry and carpentry. It was formally opened on 29 May 1914 by Maharaja Pratap Singh. In June 1942, the Technical Institute was converted into Amar Singh College through bifurcation of Sri Pratap College commemorating the name of the father of Hari Singh, the then Maharaja of Kashmir. M.D. Taseer became the first principal of Amar Singh College in 1942. was recognized by University Grants Commission of India (UGC) in June 1972. The College is accredited by National Assessment and Accreditation Council (NAAC) with B++ Grade.

== Location ==
The college is located in Wazir Bagh, in the city of Srinagar. It is spread over 35 hectares (86 acres) of land divided into a large playground, parks, gardens, and an infrastructural area.

At present, the college has multiple academic buildings making a total built-up area of about 30,000 square metres (320,000 sq ft). This includes the glorious heritage building, representing the finest blend of Anglo-Indian architecture, constructed in 1910 for running a technical institute. Presently it houses chemistry department, teaching staff room, UGC, IQAC Cell, NSS and NCC rooms, besides having six lecture theaters and three large halls for the conduct of examinations. The heritage building had got damages during earthquake in 2005 and devastating floods in September 2014. However, it was repaired and restored to its actual look in 2017-18 by the then Jammu and Kashmir state Government through INTACH. In 2020, Amar Singh college was awarded the prestigious Award of Merit in the Unesco Asia-Pacific Awards for Cultural Heritage Conservation for the restoration of the heritage building.

== About the College ==
- Amar Singh College served as a nodal college for Kashmir Division acting as a liaison between departments of higher education and about fifty government colleges of the providence. However,nstitute of Advanced Studies in Education (IASE) located at M.A Road has been designated for this j and Amar Singh College no longer remains the nodal collegeob.
- The college has a well equipped library with a collection of about 70,000 books including a collection of rare books.
- The college offers Undergraduate courses in Science, Arts, Commerce and Computer applications, and Postgraduate studies in geography, economics, and english.
- The college also offers UGC sponsored add-on job-oriented courses in information technology, video editing, computer application, and web design.
- The college is also one of the Special Study centers of IGNOU.

== Facilities ==
- Library
- Computer Labs
- Auditorium
- Gymkhana
- Canteen
- Classrooms
- Sports and Games
- Hostel
- National Service Scheme (NSS)
- National Cadet Corps (NCC)

== JKIMS ==
Jammu and Kashmir Institute of Mathematical Sciences is an autonomous public institution under recognition of University of Kashmir, situated inside the campus of Amar Singh College Srinagar in Indian administered Union Territory of Jammu and Kashmir, which was established in 2014 by the higher education department of government of Jammu and Kashmir.

Note that the college has its own departments for mathematics and statistics. JKIMS is an independent institute merely located in the premises of ASC, CUS.

== Famous alumni ==
- Kuldeep Khoda IPS

Former Director General of Police, J&K (2007-12) and Former Chief Vigilance Commissioner, J&K (2013-17). Decorated with Presidential Police Medal for Distinguished Services, President’s Police Medal for Meritorious Services, Prime Ministers Medal for Excellence in Public Administration, Wembley Savy Awarded by International Chiefs of Police Association, Washington for conceiving and implementing concept of Village Defence Committees for combating terrorism in J&K. Joined Amar Singh College in 1966. Graduated in 1970. Got 1st Rank from J&K University in Class 12 as student of the college. After graduation joined Indian Institute of Technology, Delhi wherefrom qualified in All India Civil Services Cmpetetive Exam and joined Indian Police Service in 1974.

- Major General Mohammed Amin Naik, (Chief Engineer, Central Army Command, and first Kashmiri General in the Indian Army)
- Prof. Amitabh Mattoo
- Mehrajuddin Wadoo - Football Player
- Chewang Norphel - Indian Civil Engineer
- Keshav Malik - Poet
- Kacho Sikander Khan - Writer
- Shahnaz Bashir - Writer
