= Government Degree College, Bemina =

College in Jammu and Kashmir, India

Abdul Ahad Azad Memorial Degree College
- عبدل احد آزاد میموریل ڈگری کالج، بمنہ
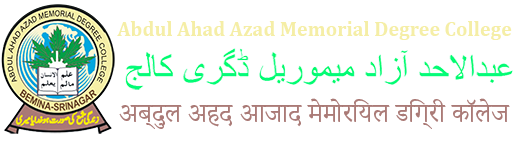
- Other name: Government Degree College Bemina
- Motto: زندگی شمع کی صورت ہو خُدایا میری
- Motto in English: "O My God Make My Life Like a Candle"
- Established: 1970 (56 years ago)
- Affiliations: University of Kashmir (1970-2017); Cluster University of Srinagar (2017-present)
- Principal: Prof. Muzafar Ahmad Bhat
- Location: Bemina, Srinagar, Jammu and Kashmir; 34.080°N 74.779°E
- Campus: 37.5 acres (15.2 ha); Urban
- Language: Urdu, English, Kashmiri, Arabic, Persian
- Website: www.gdcbemina.edu.in

The Abdul Ahad Azad Memorial College Bemina (Urdu;عبدل احد آزاد میموریل ڈگری کالج، بمنہ ) formerly known as GDC Bemina, Government Degree College, Bemina is a University Grants Commission recognized college in the Indian state of Jammu and Kashmir located on 283 Kanal (35.3 acre) campus in state summer capital Srinagar. It is affiliated with the Cluster University of Srinagar. It was established in the year 1970 and has been operational since 1972. The college has the largest campus in the state of Jammu and Kashmir spread over 283 kanal of land.

It has been awarded grade "A" by the NAAC.. The institution offers undergraduate programs in Science, Humanities, Social Sciences, Commerce, and Management Studies under NEP 2020.

== Location ==
It is located in Bemina Srinagar about two kilometres (1.2 mi) west from Srinagar city center Lal Chowk in the neighborhood of Batmaloo opposite Iqbal Memorial Institute.

== Establishment ==
The college has been established during the reign of the then Chief Minister of J&K state Ghulam Mohamad Sadiq in the year 1970. It started academic operations in the year 1972.

== Degrees offered ==
- Bachelor of Arts Honours
- Bachelor of Science Honours (medical)
- Bachelor of Science Honours (non-medical)
- Bachelor of Commerce Honours
- B.Voc(Banking & Financial Services)
- i-MCom, i-MBA
- Bachelor of Business Administration Honours
- Master of Commerce
- Integrated Political Science
- Integrated History
