= Government College for Women, Nawakadal Srinagar =

College in Jammu and Kashmir, India

Govt. College for Women, Nawakadal Srinagar
- Women's College Nawakadal Logo
- Motto: Learn to Serve
- Type: Degree College
- Established: 1961
- Academic affiliations: University of Kashmir
- Vice-Chancellor: Talat Ahmad
- Principal: Tabasum Rafiq
- Location: Nawakadal, J&K, India
- Campus: Urban
- Language: English, Urdu, Hindi, Arabic, Persian and Kashmiri
- Colours
- Website: gcwnk.ac.in

Government College for Women, Nawakadal Srinagar commonly known as Women's college Nawakadal, Nowkadal College is a University Grants Commission recognized 2B and 12f college located in Old City Downtown Srinagar. It was established in 1961. The college is affiliated with the University of Kashmir. It is the only Women Institution in Kashmir Valley offering Commerce and management Courses.

It has been awarded grade "A" by the NAAC.

== Location ==
Women's College Nawakadal is located on the Southern bank of river Jhelum near the Nawakadal Bridge in old city of Srinagar locally known as Shehr-i-Khaas. It is the only institution of Higher Education for Women located in Old City Srinagar (Downtown). It is located at a distance of about 6 km (3.7 mi) to south from the Srinagar city center Lal Chowk and about 1.5 km (0.93 mi) west from historical Jamia Masjid Srinagar.

== Establishment ==
The Government of Jammu and Kashmir established the college in 1961 with Arts and Science subjects and a teaching faculty of 19 members with just 50 students. It was established during the reign of the then Prime Minister of Jammu and Kashmir Bakshi Ghulam Mohamad.

== History ==
Women's college Nawakadal has a historical background. It is located adjacent to the historical Maharaj Gunj, the Capital of Maharaja regime and historical trade centre of Downtown Srinagar locally known as Shehr-i-Khaas.The college campus was initially the women's hospital founded by Maharaja Pratap Singh in 1890.

In 1952 the then Prime Minister of Jammu and Kashmir Sheikh Mohamad Abdullah ordered for its elevation to a women's college and it was achieved during the era of the then Prime Minister of Jammu and Kashmir Bakshi Ghulam Mohamad in 1961.

== Courses offered ==
- Bachelor of Arts
- Bachelor of Science (Medical)
- Bachelor of Science (Non Medical)
- Bachelor of Commerce (Computerized Accountancy)
- Bachelor of Business Administration
- Bachelor of Arts (Social Science)

== Awards and achievements ==
The National Assessment and Accreditation Council (NAAC) has accredited the Government College for Women, Nawakadal Srinagar, with Grade"A" in the year 2015.

== Gallery ==
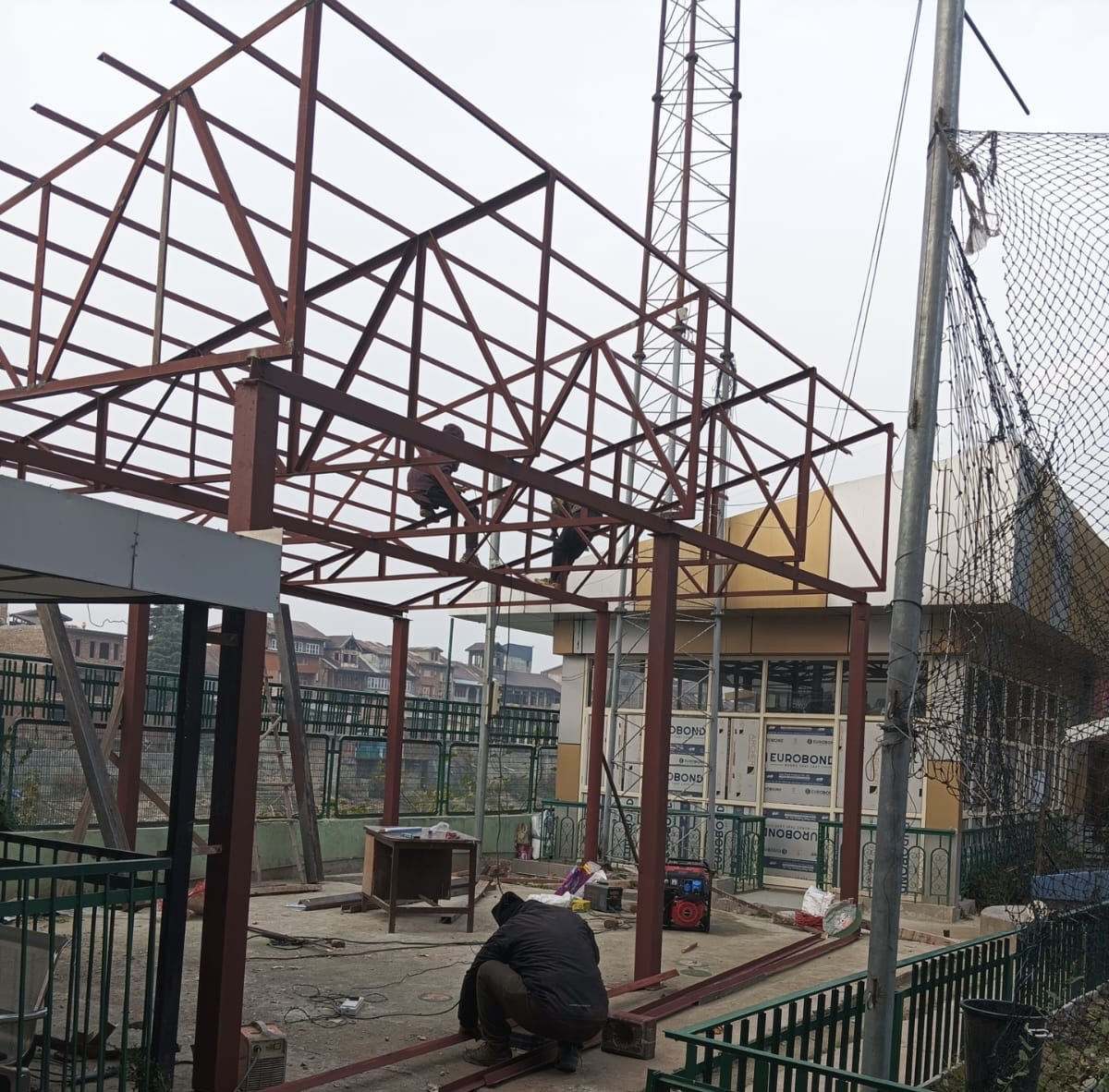
Girls Degree college Nawakadal ECCE LAB

== See also ==
- Women's College M.A Road Srinagar
- Government College for Women, Baramulla
