= Government College for Women, M.A. Road Srinagar =

College in Jammu and Kashmir, India

Government College for Women, M.A. Road, Srinagar
- گورنمنٹ کالج خواتین سرینگر
- Women's College Logo
- Motto: Light to Enlighten
- Type: State College
- Established: 1950 (76 years ago)
- Academic affiliations: Cluster University of Srinagar
- Vice-Chancellor: Prof. (Dr.) Mohammad Mobin
- Principal: Prof.(Dr.) Yasmeen Farooq
- Location: Srinagar, Jammu and Kashmir
- Campus: Urban, 8.5 acres (3.4 ha)
- Language: Urdu & English
- Colours
- Website: www.gcwmaroad.edu.in

Government College for Women, M.A. Road, Srinagar (Urdu;گورنمنٹ کالج خواتین ایم اے رُوڈ سرینگر) commonly known as Women's College Srinagar is located on 8.5 acre campus in summer Capital of Jammu and Kashmir, Srinagar near Lal Chowk opposite SP College. It was founded in 1950. The college is affiliated to Cluster University of Srinagar, recognized by UGC and accredited with ‘B+’ grade by NAAC. The college is celebrating its Diamond Jubilee (75th anniversary) on Octobter 15, 2025. The Diamond Jubilee celebrations started with Mehmooda Ali Shah Interdisciplinary Lecture Series in March this year.

== Establishment ==
The Government of Jammu and Kashmir established the college in October 1950, during the reign of the then Prime Minister of Jammu and Kashmir, Sheikh Mohamad Abdullah.

== Overview ==
Women's College Srinagar is in central Srinagar. The college is affiliated with the Cluster University of Srinagar and UGC under 2(f) and 12(b) of UGC Act 1956.

== Faculties ==
- Faculty of Human Development
- Faculty of English
- Faculty of Sciences
- Faculty of Computer Science
- Faculty of Social Sciences
- Faculty of Humanities, Islamic and Oriental Learning
- Faculty of Home Sciences

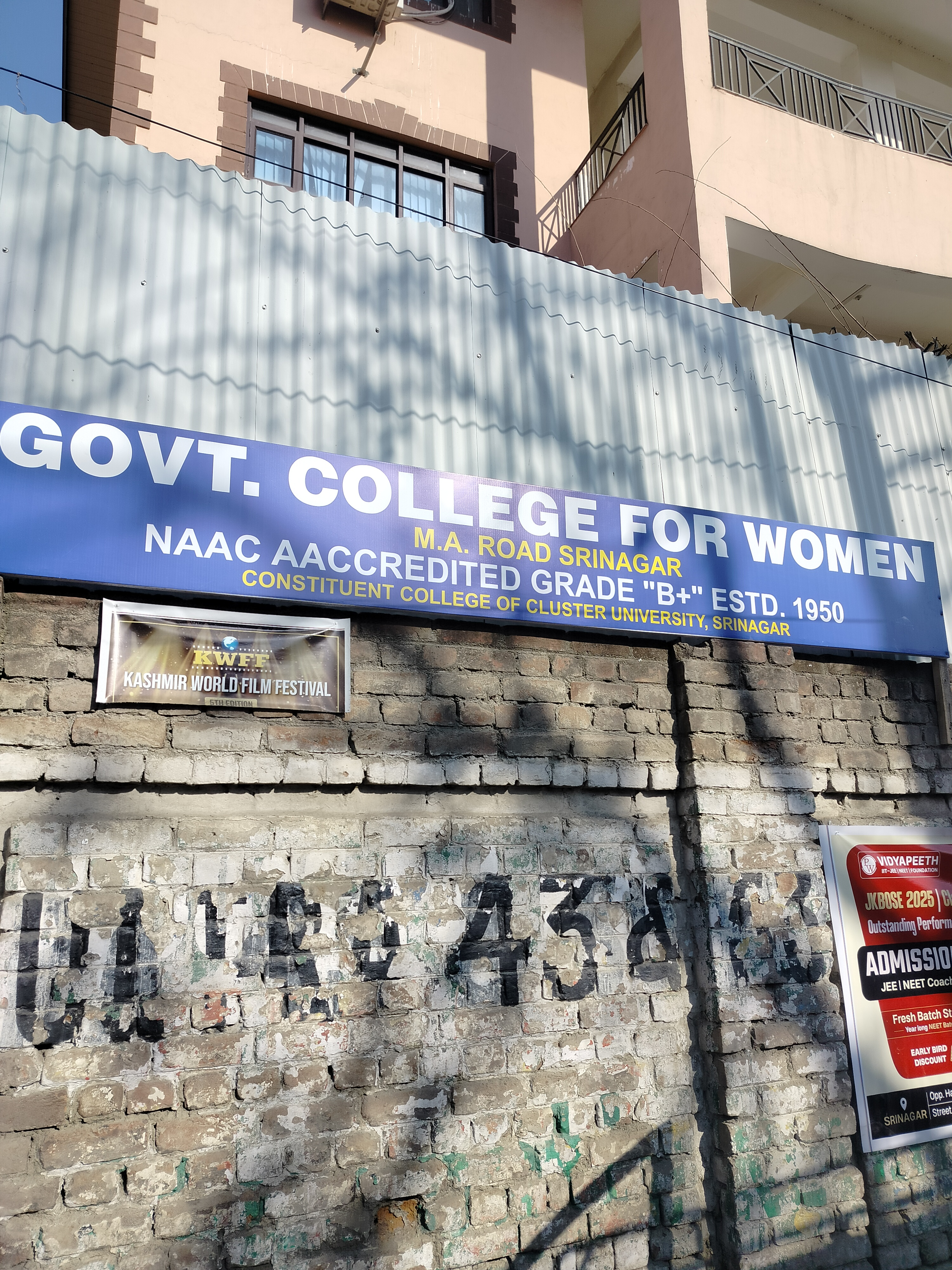
Signboard of Government College for Women, M.A. Road, Srinagar

== Degrees offered ==
- Bachelor of Science (Medical)
- Bachelor of Science (Non-Medical)
- Bachelor of Science (Home Science)
- Bachelor of Arts
- Bachelor of Arts (Hons) Journalism and Mass Communication.
- Integrated MCA.
- Bachelor of Arts (Hons) English
- Master of Science (Home Science)
- Bachelor of Nursing

== Awards and achievements ==
The National Assessment and Accreditation Council (NAAC) has accredited the Government College for Women, M A Road, Srinagar, with Grade A.

== See also ==
- Government College for Women, Nawakadal Srinagar
- Government College for Women, Baramulla
