= Government Degree College, Pattan =

College in Jammu and Kashmir, India

Government Degree College Pattan
- Type: Degree college
- Established: 2005
- Academic affiliations: University of Kashmir
- Location: Pattan, Baramulla, Jammu and Kashmir, India
- Campus: Rural
- Language: Urdu & English
- Website: http://gdcpattan.edu.in/

The Government Degree College Pattan also known as GDC Pattan, Pattan College, is a University of Kashmir affiliated degree college located at Pattan in Baramulla district of Indian administrated state of Jammu and Kashmir.The college is recognised by University Grants Commission of India under sections 2(f) and 12(b) of UGC, Act 1956. The college underwent first cycle of NAAC inspection in November 2021 and was graded 'C' grade with the score of 2.0 on 7 point scale.

== Location ==
The college is located at Pattan in Baramulla district in the Indian administrated state of Jammu and Kashmir. It is about 27 km (17 mi) from district headquarter Baramulla and about the same distance from the state summer capital Srinagar.The college is located just half a kilometer away from the main Pattan Chowk. Additionally, two famous temple ruins of Shankaragaureshwar and Sugandhesa are almost equidistant from the main college building.

== Establishment ==
Government of Jammu and Kashmir established the college in the year 2005 during the Chief-Ministership of Mufti Mohammad Sayeed under Prime Minister of India's reconstruction plan.Currently the college has got staff strength of 49 including post of a Principal and other Teaching and Non Teaching staff members.

== Courses offered ==
The college offers various bachelor courses in Arts, Commerce and Science at the undergraduate level.

=== Bachelor courses ===
- Bachelors in Arts
- Bachelors in Science (Medical)
- Bachelors in Science (Non-Medical)
- Bachelors in Commerce
- Bachelors of Science in Information Technology (B.Sc IT)

In addition, many new skill courses have been included in the curriculum in consonance with the National Education Policy 2020.
