= Bemina =

Bemina Bemyun (pronounced in Kashmiri language)
- Town
- Location in Jammu and Kashmir, India Bemina (India)
- Coordinates: 34°3′12″N 74°45′43″E
- Country: India
- Union territory: Jammu and Kashmir
- District: Srinagar

Government
  - Body: Government of Jammu and Kashmir
- Elevation: 1,585 m (5,200 ft)

Languages
  - Official: Kashmiri, Urdu, Hindi, Dogri, English
- Time zone: UTC+5:30 (IST)
- Postal Code: 190018
- Vehicle registration: JK
- Website: srinagar.nic.in

Bemina or Bemyun is a region in the city of Srinagar, the summer capital of Jammu and Kashmir, India. It is in the heart of the summer capital of Jammu and Kashmir just about 4 km (2.5 mi) from Lal Chowk. It lies in the Batamaloo Assembly Constituency, Batamaloo assembly segment of the Srinagar parliamentary constituency.

== Etymology ==
Bemina was originally called "Abhimanyupur".

== History ==
Bemina was a nabal before it was developed by srinagar development authority .

== Flood plain ==
Bemina was settled on the local floodplains of adjoining rivers. Unplanned and haphazard construction led to usurpation of flood plains. A direct consequence of this is that it is one of the most flood prone areas in the Srinagar city.
