= Bohipora =

Bohipora Buhipor Buhipora
- Village
- Location in Jammu and Kashmir, India Bohipora (India)
- Coordinates: 34.52°N 74.24°E
- Country: India
- Union Territory: Jammu and Kashmir
- District: Kupwara

Population (2011)
  - Total: 2,563

Languages
  - Official: Kashmiri, Urdu, Hindi, English
- Postal code: 193222

Bohipora or Buhipora is a village in Kupwara district in the Indian union territory of Jammu and Kashmir. According to the 2011 census of India, the village had a population of 2,563 people (1,319 males; 1,244 females).

The Government Degree College in Kupwara has been located at Bohipora since 2000.

== Description ==
Bohipora is located about 1 km from kupwara town on Kupwara Poshpora road. The village is connected through two bridges on either side, Pumpshed bridge also called "Boud Kadal" (large bridge), connects Bohipora with Kupwara town, and Gushi Kadal, located over Kahmil Nala, connects Bohipora with village Gushi.

After recurrent floods, which made the people to abandon their homes, some steps were taken to improve the safety of the village by creating bundhs and a bridge was also allotted, but it is still incomplete. Bund work has been done to minimize damage due to floods as the village is prone to recurrent floods. D.I.E.T kupwara is located in Bohipora on the Bohipora - Poshpora Road. A public park for women and children is also under construction which lies on the bank of Nala Tikkertar. This village has a variety of walnut trees.

== Schools ==
- Al Mustafa English Medium Near Degree College Bohipora.
- Un-Nadvia International School Bohipora.
- Govt. Middle school Bohipora.

== Mosques ==
- Masjid Al-Mustafa(Jamiah Masjid)
- Masjid Ismail
- Masjid Bilal
- Masjid Rabbulaalamin
