= Government Degree College for Boys, Anantnag =

Educational institute

Government Degree College, Anantnag
- گورنمنٹ ڈگری کالج، انتناگ
- Humanities block of GDC Anantnag
- Motto: “To orient with the realisation of ‘The Self’ And to equip with the passion for service unto creation”
- Type: Government degree college
- Established: 1950 (76 years ago)
- Accreditation: NAAC, NIRF, UGC.
- Affiliations: University of Kashmir
- Principal: Prof. Mushtaq Ahmad Malik
- Location: Khanabal, Anantnag, Jammu and Kashmir, India; 33°44′37″N 75°07′42″E
- Campus: 31.25 acres (12.65 ha); Urban
- Website: www.gdcboysang.ac.in

The Government Degree College, Anantnag was established in 1950 as an Intermediate College. One of the largest colleges of northern India, it is spread over an area of 250 kanals. After functioning as an intermediate college for eleven (11) years, the college attained Degree College status in 1961-62. The college was given 2(f) and 12 (B) status by the UGC in 1972. After the implementation of NCERT pattern (10+02+03) in the state in 1983-1984, the 11th and 12th classes were delinked from the institution. In the 1980s, the IGNOU Study centre (1211) was established in the college. The college was Accredited by NAAC first in 2005 then in 2012 and then in 2021 to evaluate the academic standards of the institution conferring college with B+, A and B+ grade respectively. In a stride forward, the college was granted the “College with Potential for Excellence” (CPE) status by UGC in April 2016.

== Degrees ==
The college offers various undergraduate courses ranging from Arts, Science, to Humanities.

Here is the list of Undergraduate Courses offered by the college.

1. Bachelor of Commerce (BCOM)
2. Bachelor of Computer Application (BCA)
3. Bachelor of Science Medical (BSC)
4. Bachelor of Science Non-Medical (BSC)
5. Bachelor of Arts (BA)
6. Bachelor of mass media and mass communication (BMMMC)
7. BA Honours in English (BA ENGLISH LITERATURE)
8. Bachelor of Business Administration. (BBA)
9. Bachelor of Science in Information Technology (BSC. IT)

== Facilities ==
The college has a library, housed in a newly constructed building, and about 56,000 books in addition to subscriptions to local, national and international magazines, journals and other periodicals. Some departments also have departmental libraries.

Other academic facilities include a study center for Indira Gandhi Open University.

Physical education and first aid health care facilities are available.

== Hostel ==
The College Hostel provides accommodation to at least 120 students at a time. The College gives hostel facilities to only those students who live far from their college.
