= Government Degree College, Bijbehara =

College in Anantnag, Jammu and Kashmir, India

Government Degree College Bijbehara
- The Principal, The Dean, The Scholars And The Students Of Degree College In Bijbehara
- Latin: Imperium Degree Collegium Bijbehara
- Motto: زندگی شمع کی صورت ہو خدایا میری
- Type: Government Degree College
- Established: 2005 (21 years ago)
- Parent institution: Kashmir University
- Affiliations: University of Kashmir
- Location: Bijbehara, Jammu and Kashmir, India; 33.801°N 75.115°E
- Campus: Rural
- Language: Koshur Urdu and English
- Website: www.gdcbijbehara.edu.in

Government Degree College Bijbehara, also known as GDC Bijbehara, is a University of Kashmir affiliated co-educational degree college located in Bijbehara in the Indian union territory of Jammu and Kashmir. The college is affiliated with the University of Kashmir and recognised by the University Grants Commission of India under 2(f) and 12(b) of UGC Act, 1956. The college has been accredited by NAAC for the first time in 2019 and awarded Grade B.

== Establishment ==
Govt. Degree College Bijbehara was established in the year 2005. It started its operation from the year 2006. It was established during the chief-ministership of Mufti Mohammad Sayeed under Prime Minister of India's Reconstruction Plan. The college started its operations with only 22 students.

== See also ==
- List of colleges in Anantnag
