= Government Degree College, Sopore =

College in Sopore, India

Government Degree College Sopore
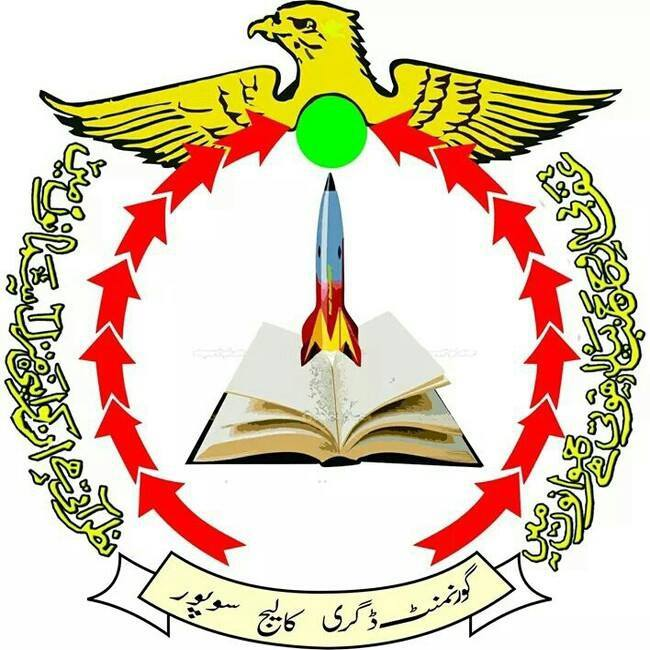
- Motto: "from darkness to light"
- Type: Government Institution
- Established: 1951
- Affiliations: University of Kashmir
- Principal: Prof. Dr. Syed Muzaffar Ahmad
- Location: Sopore Town, Union Territory of Jammu and Kashmir, India
- Website: www.gdcsopore.ac.in

Government Degree College Sopore is an educational institution located in the town of Sopore in the Baramulla District of Jammu and Kashmir, India. The college was established in 1951 to provide higher education to the students of the area. It is one of the oldest institutes in the valley of Kashmir and is National Assessment and Accreditation Council (NAAC) accredited "A". In its third cycle of NAAC assessment, the college was awarded grade A, for the first time in its history, after a NAAC peer team visit took place on May 10–11, 2023.

== History ==
Government Degree College, Sopore Kashmir was established as an intermediate college in 1949, then housed in present Boys Higher Secondary Institute Sopore with Late Prof. Mufti Jalal-ud-din as its first principal. The foundation stone of the college was formally laid down by the Prime Minister Hon’ble Late Sheikh Muhammad Abdullah on 27 September 1951 starting with a meager roll of 50 odd students in 1951. The institution has presently 5500 students on rolls, with about 2500 girl students making it the biggest multi-disciplinary co-education institution of the valley.

In 1970 it became affiliated with the University of Kashmir.

The college emblem is “Minnaz Zulumati illan Noor” (English: “from darkness to light”).

The college is funded by the state government and boasts a distinguished faculty of over 50 permanent professors. In addition to the core faculty, the institution has access to a pool of 60 contracted teachers, allowing for flexibility in addressing any staffing needs.

== Campus ==
Since 1951, the college has developed into a multi-faculty institution with faculty of Arts, Science, Commerce and Management and Computer Applications, all staffed by academics with research and teaching experience.

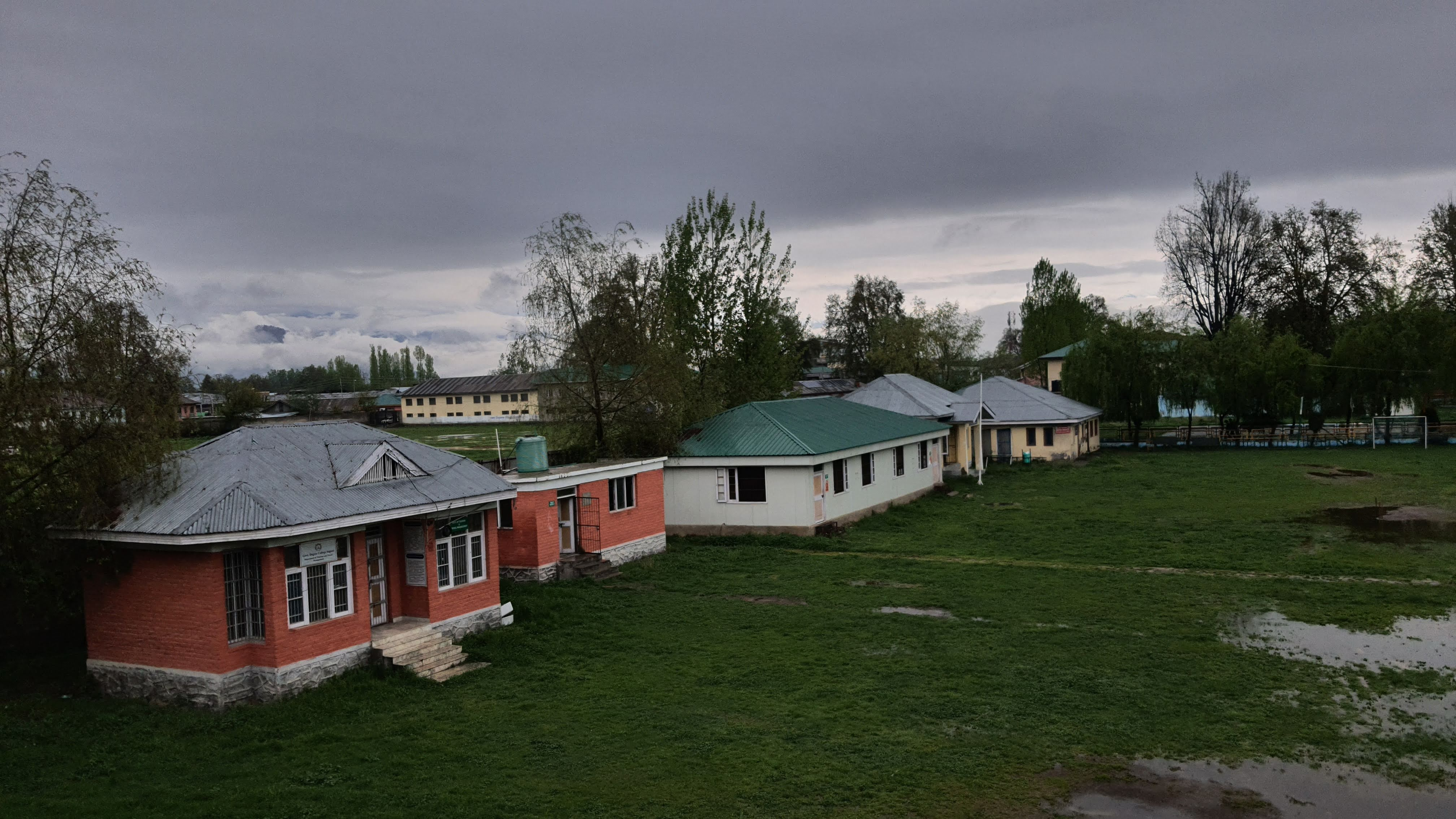
From Left: Department of Tourism, Washroom, Canteen, Male Staff Room, Gymnasium.

This college is housing IGNOU Study Centre since January, 2000 that provides platform for providing education to large segment of population through distance mode.

The campus features a main building along with a variety of specialized structures to support academic and extracurricular activities. These include the Admissions Block, Science Block (housing the Botany and Chemistry departments as well as classrooms), Geo-sciences Building, Commerce and Management Studies Building, Computer Applications and IT Building, Department of Tourism & Travel Management Building, Biotechnology Department Building, Examination Block, Laboratory Building, and a Canteen.

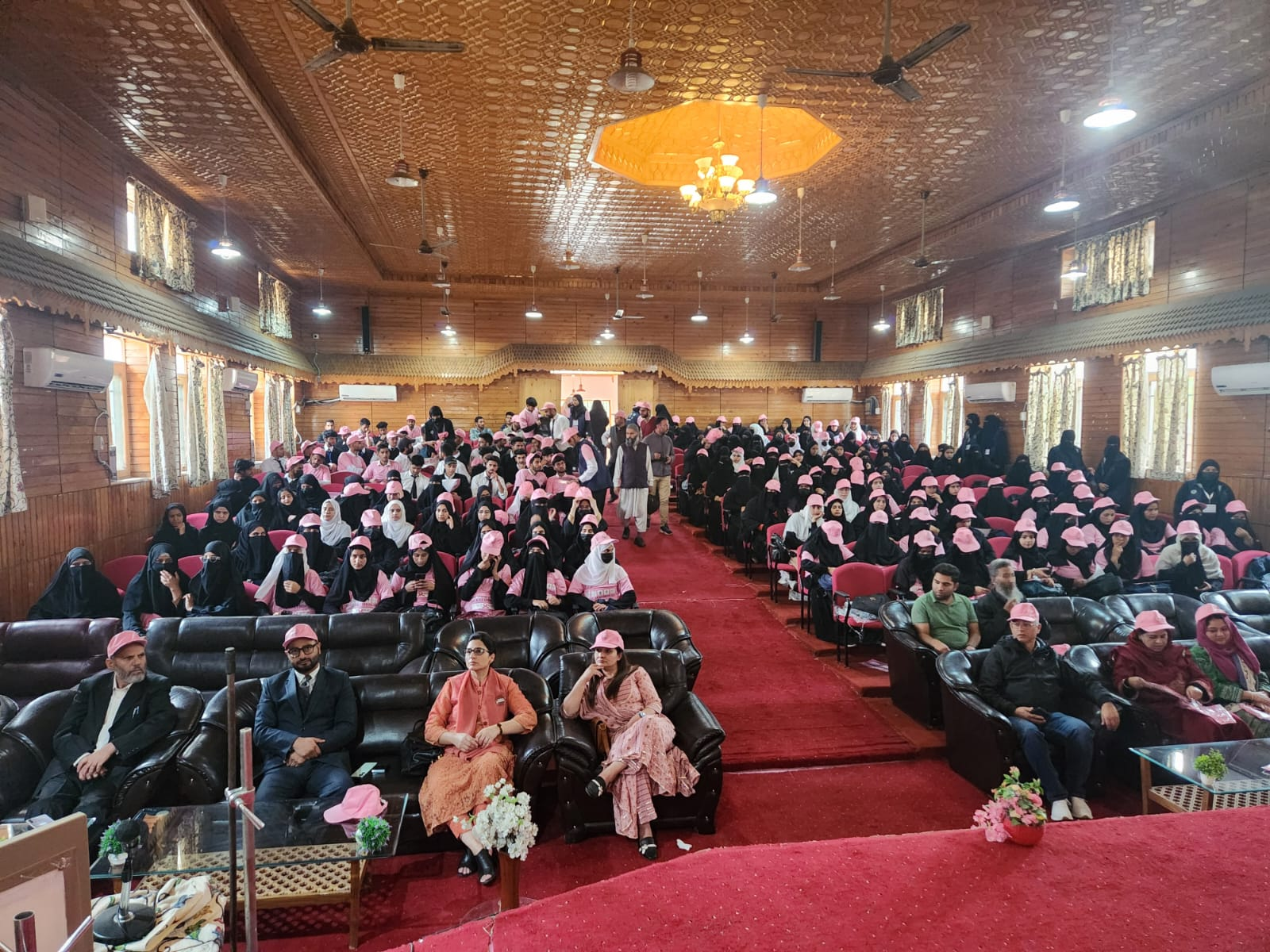
Pinkayathon 2024 (The Annual Breast Cancer Awareness Mega Event of Kashmir) held at GDC Sopore.

The campus also includes a Gymnasium, multiple washroom facilities, and a well-equipped library with a dedicated reading room for newspapers, magazines, and other materials. For cultural and recreational events, the college offers a decorated auditorium and an indoor stadium, supported by an active Sports Department. Additionally, the Botany Department maintains a botanical garden with a lily pond and an array of tree species. Greenhouse, Fern-house and Herbal Garden are installed in the presently existing Botanical Garden. Solar Park for college, fair price shop equipped with stationery items are coming up in the campus. fast food facilities, Internet facilities /Broadband facilities and An EDUSAT facilities connected with main hub at Srinagar has been made functional.

For e-governance of admissions, examinations and internet connectivity, the University of Kashmir has raised facility by erecting the towers and providing gadgetry support. College Library has Automation Support.

== Administration and Academic Heads ==
The administrative leadership and departmental heads of the institution are as follows:

Administrative Officials:

- Principal: Prof. Dr. Syed Muzaffar Ahmad
- Vice-Principal: Prof. Zahoor Ahmad Shah
- Chief Librarian: Ansaar Hussain Ghanayi
- Coordinator Examinations: Prof. Tanveer Ahmad
- Convener Admissions: Prof. Nisar Ahmad Khan
- IQAC Coodinator: Vacant

== Courses Offered ==
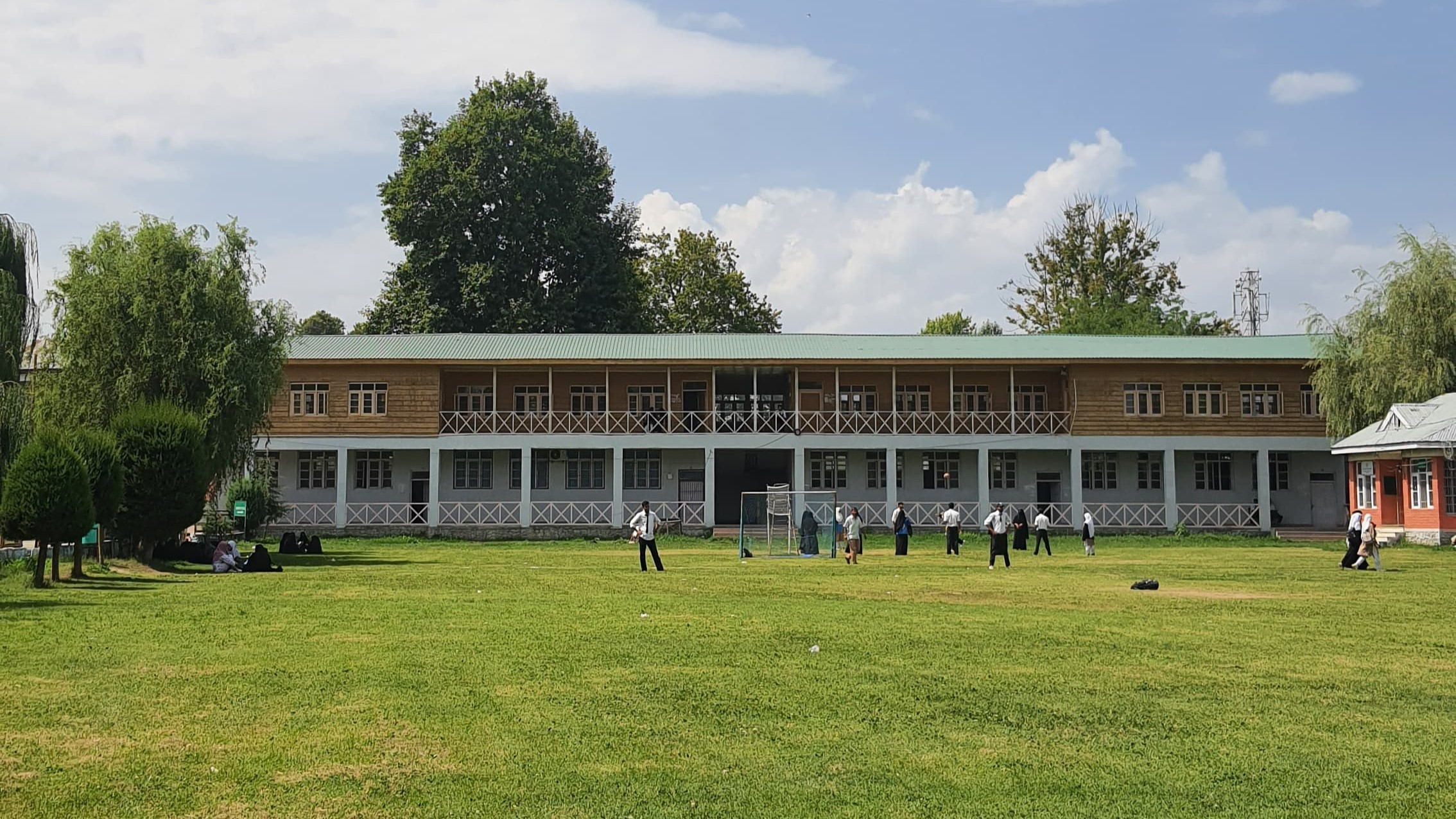
Examination Block GDC Sopore With the students playing in the Sports Field and Department of Tourism in the right.

Degree Programs:

- Bachelor of Business Administration (BBA) – 6-Semester Course
- Bachelor of Commerce (B.Com) – 6-Semester Course
- Bachelor of Arts (B.A.) – 6-Semester Course
- Bachelor of Science (B.Sc.) – 6-Semester Course
- Bachelor of Computer Applications (BCA) – 6-Semester Course

== MOU’s Undertaken by the Dept. of Management Studies ==
=== Skill Development Initiatives and Collaborations ===
The college has established various partnerships and collaborations to enhance skill-based education and align its curriculum with industry standards. Key initiatives include:

1. Tripartite Memorandum of Understanding (MoU): Signed with the Department of Higher Education (Government of Jammu & Kashmir), University of Kashmir, and SKUAST-K Shalimar to implement a Skill Development Programme within the college.
2. NASSCOM Sector Skill Council (Noida): Collaboration for curriculum alignment, assessment, and sup port of UGC-approved skill development programs.
3. Tourism and Hospitality Sector Skill Council (THSC): Engaged for curriculum alignment and support in UGC-approved skill initiatives.
4. Homemade & Apparel Designing Sector Skill Council: Partnered for curriculum development and student assessments in skill-based courses approved by the UGC.
5. Retail Association Sector Skill Council: Affiliated for curriculum and assessment development under UGC-recognized skill programs.
6. National Institute of Electronics and Information Technology (NIELIT), Srinagar: Provides training and certification programs in Basic Computer Applications, GST, and Tally-based accounting.
7. MoU Under Progress: Ongoing collaboration with JKEDI Pampore and the New Generation Innovation and Entrepreneurship Development Centre (University of Kashmir) to foster innovation and enterprise skills.

=== Academic Scope and Curriculum Expansion ===
The college offers a diverse range of undergraduate programs across the fields of Arts, Sciences, Social Sciences, and Commerce. It is affiliated with the University of Kashmir

To meet the changing needs of the job market and support both employment and entrepreneurship, the college is integrating “add-on” certificate courses into its academic framework aimed to broaden students’ skill sets and improve their professional competitiveness.

== Noted archaeological find ==
In 1990 a group of geology students studied soil strata with Dr. A.M. Dur and M.S. Lone and happened upon exposed elephant tusk in the village of Galandar in the Pulwama district. Further excavation resulting in the find of an additional elephant tusk, skull and other fossils and remains which were examined by Dr. Mohammad Ismail Bhat at Kashmir University. Stone tools found in the area and the presence of percussion marks on the elephant skull indicate that the elephant was killed by humans with primitive tools. The remains are considered to be at least 50,000 years old and may be as much as 10 million years old. The remains are the first clear evidence that there may have been human in South Asia during the Paleolithic age.

== Notable alumni ==
- Engineer Rashid (Member of Parliament Baramulla)
- Syed Ali Shah Geelani (Chairman of Tehreek-e-Hurriyat)

== See also ==
- Central Board of Secondary Education
- Education in India
- Indian Certificate of Secondary Education
- University of Kashmir
- National Institute of Technology, Srinagar
