= Government Degree College, Kulgam =

College in Jammu and Kashmir, India

Government Degree College Kulgam
- Type: Degree College
- Established: 2004 (22 years ago)
- Academic affiliations: University of Kashmir
- Principal: Syed Aezaz Ahmad Rizvi
- Location: Kulgam, Jammu and Kashmir, India
- Campus: Rural
- Language: Urdu and English
- Website: http://gdckulgam.edu.in/Main/Default.aspx

The Government Degree College, Kulgam also known as GDC Kulgam is the University of Kashmir affiliated autonomous co-educational degree college located in Kulgam in the Indian union territory of Jammu and Kashmir. It is one of the premier learning of higher education in South Kashmir. The college is recognized by the University Grants Commission, under sections 2(f) and 12(b) of UGC Act, 1956.

== Location ==
Govt. Degree College Kulgam is located near Sumo stand Kulgam, distance of about one km (0.62 mi) from Kulgam town on Chawalgam road. It is also situated at a distance of about 72 km (45 mi) south from the summer capital of Srinagar.

== Establishment ==
Govt. of Jammu and Kashmir established the college under the Chief-Ministership of Mufti Mohammad Sayeed in the year 2004.

== Courses offered ==
The college offers various bachelor courses.

- Bachelor of Arts (BA)
- Bachelor of Science (Medical)
- Bachelor of Science (Non-Medical)
- Bachelor of Commerce (B.Com.)
- Bachelor of Business Administration (BBA)

•Bachelor of Computer Applications(BCA)
