= Government Degree College, Shopian =

College in Jammu and Kashmir, India

Government Degree College Shopian
- Type: UG Degree College NAAC accredited Grade 'B'
- Established: 1988
- Academic affiliations: University of Kashmir
- Principal: Prof. (Dr.) Mohd Shafiq
- Location: Shopian, Jammu and Kashmir, India
- Campus: Rural
- Language: Arabic, Kashmiri, Urdu, Persian and English
- Website: gdcshopian.edu.in

Government Degree College Shopian also known as GDC Shopian, is an autonomous degree college affiliated with the University of Kashmir, located on a 67 kanal (8.375 acres [3.389 ha]) campus in Shopian in the Indian union territory of Jammu and Kashmir. The college provides admission in more than 146 combinations involving more than 30 subjects. In addition, the college facilitates off-campus education in collaboration with IGNOU, MANUU and the Department of Distance Education of the University of Kashmir. The college is recognized by the UGC, under sections 2(f) and 12(b). The college was established in 1988 by the Government of J&K.

== Location ==
Degree College Shopian is located in Gagren one kilometre (0.62 mi) from the main town Shopian, about 51 km (32 mi) south of the state summer capital Srinagar and 20 km (12 mi) from Pulwama City.

== Courses ==
The college offers three year bachelor courses in Arts, Science, Social Science, Commerce, Computer Science, Business Administration

=== Bachelor courses ===
- Bachelors in Arts
- Bachelors in Arts (Social Science)
- Bachelors in Science
- Bachelors in Science (with Mathematics)
- BBA
- BCA
- B.Com
- The college has introduced many job oriented subjects in 2018 which include Food Science & Technology, Bio-technology, Bio-Chemistry, Clinical Biochemistry etc. GDC Shopian is the second college in Kashmir valley after Women's College M.A. Road Srinagar to start Food Science & Technology as one of the core subjects in UG.
- The GDC Shopian College is the only college in J&K to start Horticulture subject as one of the subject in science stream.
