= Hazratbal =

Hazratbal Dargah
- Town
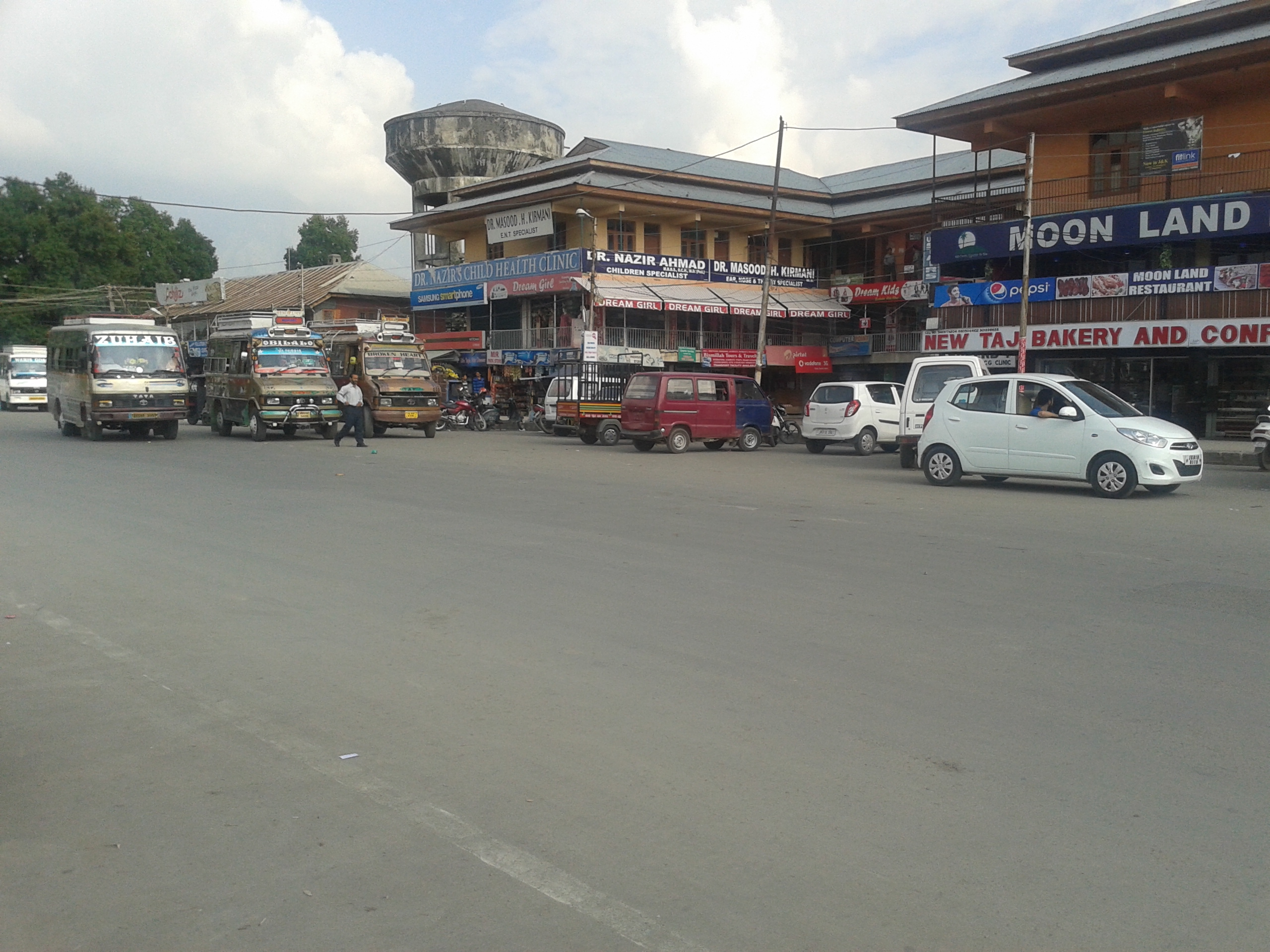
- Nickname: Dargah
- Location within Jammu and Kashmir Location within India
- Coordinates: 34.131°N 74.842°E
- Country: India
- Union territory: Jammu and Kashmir
- District: Srinagar
- Established: Ancient
- Founder: Sheikh Muhammad Abdullah
- Named for: Holy Relics

Government
  - Type: Nagar panchayat
  - Body: Government of India

Languages
  - Official: Kashmiri, Urdu, Hindi, Dogri, English
- Time zone: UTC+5:30 (IST)
- Postal Code: 190006

Hazratbal is a notified area situated in the Srinagar district of Jammu and Kashmir. It is about 10 km (6.2 mi) from the Srinagar city center. The area became famous after the construction of Hazratbal Shrine, where hundreds of thousands of people visit every year because many relics related to the Islamic prophet Muhammad are believed to be there.

The word Hazrat in Urdu gives an indication of "respect" and bal in Kashmiri means "place". Thus, the word Hazratbal means the place which is highly respected among the people. The Dal Lake and its houseboats in the vicinity made the city a tourist spot, and the area's economy depended on tourism.

The grave of Sheikh Muhammad Abdullah is situated in the area.

The postal code of the area is 190006.

== Divisions ==
The areas that come under the constituency of Hazratbal are as under:

- Hazratbal town
- Naseem Bagh
- Mallabagh srinagar
- Usmaan Abad Malabagh
- Batpora
- Zukura
- Ishber
- Habak
- Sadiribal
- Gulab Bagh
- Molvi Stop
- Bota Kadal
- Lal Bazar Hazratbal Main Road
- Pari Chowk, Lal Bazar, Hazratbal Main Road
- Tailbal

== Education ==
There are three educational institutions in the area.

- Kashmir University
- College of Engineering - University of Kashmir, also known as "Zukura Campus"
- National Institute of Technology, Srinagar

Due to this reason, it is considered as higher education centre in Kashmir Valley. Students from different parts of the state study Art, Humanities, Science, Arabic, Persian, Urdu, Engineering in these institutions.
