= Government College for Women, Baramulla =

Degree college in Baramulla, Jammu and Kashmir

Women's College Baramulla
- Type: Degree College
- Established: 1986 (39 years ago)
- Academic affiliations: University of Kashmir
- Vice-Chancellor: Prof. Neelofar Khan
- Principal: Prof. (Dr.) Neelofar Bhat
- Location: Baramulla, Jammu and Kashmir, India
- Campus: Urban, 4.625 acres (1.872 ha)
- Language: English, Urdu, Kashmiri
- Website: gdcwbla.ac.in//

Government College for Women Baramulla commonly known as Women's College Baramulla is a Degree College located on a 4.625-acre (1.872 ha) campus in Baramulla, Jammu and Kashmir. It was founded in the year 1986. The college is affiliated with the University of Kashmir.

It has been awarded grade "B" by the NAAC.

== Establishment ==
The Govt. of Jammu and Kashmir established the college in the year 1986 during the era of the then chief minister of Jammu and Kashmir Farooq Abdullah.

== Location ==
Women's College Baramulla is situated on National Highway Road, near tehsil point, Baramulla 54 km north-west of state summer capital Srinagar. It is a premier institution of Higher Learning for women in district Baramulla.

== Overview ==
Women's College Baramulla was established in the year 1986. The college is affiliated with the University of Kashmir and recognised by UGC under (f) and 12(b) of UGC Act 1956. It was initially housed in Govt. Girls Higher Secondary School Baramulla located adjacent to the present campus area. It started its academic venture with a meager number of students in Arts & Commerce and was later on shifted to its own campus in the year 1995. Science stream was introduced after a gap of 16 years in 2002 and Computer Sciences were introduced in 2005 almost 20 years after the establishment of the college.

== Courses offered ==
- Bachelor of Arts
- Bachelor of Science (Medical)
- Bachelor of Science (Non Medical)
- Bachelor of Commerce
- Bachelor of Computer Applications

Besides this add on course like Data Care Management, Data Processing Management & Sericulture are offered to students.
