= Sri Pratap College =

College in Srinagar, India

- SP College Logo
- Motto: Ad Aethera Tendens
- Motto in English: Fly high and higher
- Type: Science College
- Established: 1905; 121 years ago
- Founder: Annie Besant
- Academic affiliations: University of the Punjab (1912–1947); Banaras Hindu University (1948–1955); University of Kashmir (1956–2017); Cluster University of Srinagar (2017 – present)
- Principal: Prof. (Dr.) Haris Izhar Tantray
- Location: Srinagar, J&K, India
- Campus: 24.2 acres (9.8 ha); Urban
- Language: English & Urdu
- Colours
- Website: www.spcollege.edu.in

Sri Pratap College, commonly known as SP College, is an academic and professional college in Srinagar, Jammu and Kashmir, India. The college has been accredited by NAAC with an 'A+' Grade. It is the oldest institute of higher education in the Kashmir Valley.

== Location ==
It is located in the heart of summer capital of the Indian union territory of Jammu and Kashmir, i. e., Srinagar, at M.A. Road, Srinagar.

== History ==
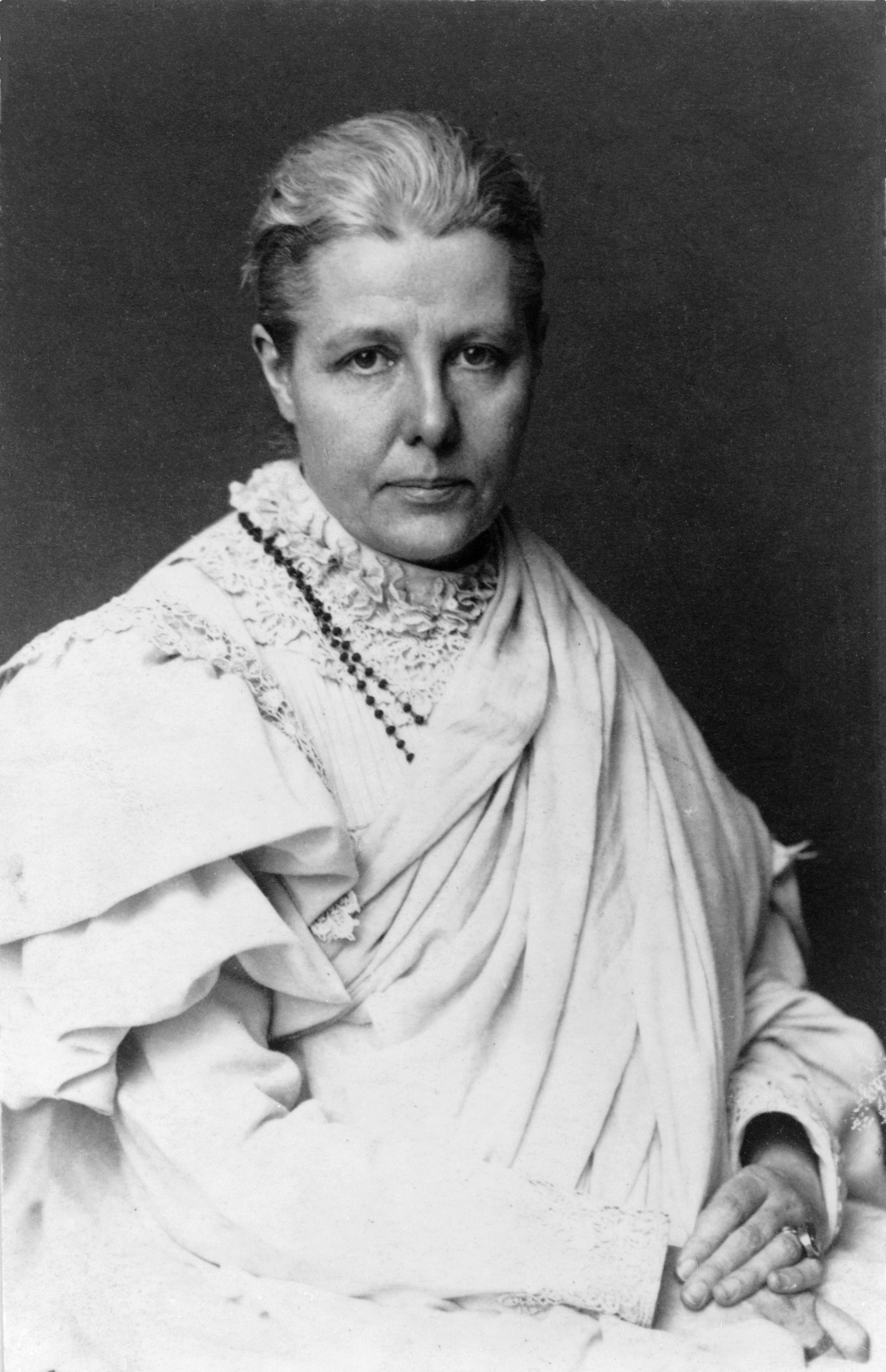
Annie Besant established the Hindu College, Srinagar, in 1905.

Established in 1905 by Annie Besant for the then ruler of Jammu and Kashmir Shri Maharaja Pratap Singh. Before Indian independence, the college was affiliated with University of Punjab and post independence Banaras Hindu University gave affiliation to S.P. college until the University of Kashmir was founded in 1956. It was established in 1905, as an intermediate college by upgrading the famous Hindu High School, Srinagar. It was the personal effort of notable British Social Reformer and educationist, Annie Besant who directed the Central Hindu College Trust, Banaras(to which it was affiliated) to appoint, Mr M.U. Moore, a noted Irish Scholar as the first principal of the institution. Beginning with a modest roll of eight students and only six teachers on its staff, in a few years' time, the college rose to the degree level in Arts by 1911 when state government took it over and renamed it as Sri Pratap College after the name of the then ruler of the state Maharaja Pratap Singh. In 1912 the college was affiliated to the University of Punjab, Lahore with the state patronage available to it by virtue of which the growth of S.P College received a notable fillip. Ever since, the development of the college has been a steady process through the entire span of the 20th century.

During the tenure of Prof. I.K Sharga (1911–1921), the science stream up to intermediate level was introduced in the college curriculum. Prof. M.U. Moore, Prof. Vinamali Chakaravati, Prof. I.K. Sharga, Prof. Lawrence Mac Dermot, Prof. M.M. Ibrahim, Dr. M. D. Taseer, Prof. Jia Lal Kaul and Prof. Saif ud Din also served the college. College alumni later held positions in various fields within and outside the state.

The college has celebrated its centenary year in 2005, and in this year people from the world participated in the college function, as the different departments of the college organized different workshops and exhibitions.

The history of S.P College is, in-fact, the history of progress of higher education in Kashmir. Almost for the first half of the 20th century, S.P. College had the distinction of being the only institution to provide facilities for imparting higher education in Arts and Sciences in the valley. Despite a good number of colleges coming into existence in the valley after 1947, this college continues to maintain its primacy and academic excellence all along. With the delinking of arts faculty from it in 1975, S.P. College is now an exclusively science college imparting science education at Undergraduate level in a broad spectrum of subjects like English, Chemistry, Botany, Zoology, Environment and Water Management, Biochemistry, Clinical Biochemistry, Biotechnology, Bioinformatics, Human Genetics, Mathematics, Statistics, Physics, Geology, Geography, Electronics, Information Technology. The college also offers add-on course in Spoken Arabic, Environmental Sciences, Communicative English, Personality Development, Physical Education, Diagnostic Lab Technology etc. The college also offers Postgraduate level programmes in various science subjects.

The institute has been declared as a part of the Cluster University of Srinagar under the Rashtriya Uchchatar Shiksha Abhiyan. The institute shall run School of Sciences under this initiative offering more postgraduate as well as research intensive programmes. With operationalization of the school of Sciences under RUSA cluster University proposal, research is expected to get a flip with more funding coming for the purpose. The infrastructure for this project is being funded by Central Government and is coming-up at brisk pace. The school is likely to start from 2017.

It is worth to mention that the college got submerged in the September 2014 deluge. This resulted in huge loss of infrastructure, labs, some 60,000 books, and other support facilities.

== Courses ==
The college offers a range of nationally and internationally recognized undergraduate and postgraduate programmes in a variety of academic disciplines including Science and Information Technology. It is recognized by the University Grants Commission of India, (UGC). It is affiliated to Cluster University Srinagar. The college offers following courses:

- Five-Year (Integrated) M.Sc. in Physics
- Five-Year (Integrated) M.Sc. in Zoology
- Five-Year (Integrated) M.Sc. in Chemistry
- Five-Year (Integrated) M.Sc. in Environmental Science
- Five-Year (Integrated) M.Sc. in Information Technology
- Five-Year (Integrated) M.Sc. in Water Resources & Waste Water Technology
- Five-Year (Integrated) M.Sc. in Botany
- Six-Semester based B.Sc. (Hons) in Physics
- Six-Semester based B.Sc. (Hons) in Mathematics
- Six-Semester based B.Sc. (Hons) in Statistics
- Six-Semester based B.Sc. (Hons) in Geology
- Six-Semester based B.Sc. (Hons) in I.T
- Six-Semester based B.Sc. (Hons) in Botany
- Six-Semester based B.Sc. (Hons) in Zoology
- Six-Semester based B.Sc. (Hons) in Chemistry
- Six-Semester based B.Sc. (Hons) in Biochemistry
- Six-Semester based B.Sc. (Hons) in Water Resources & Waste Water Technology
- Six-Semester based B.Sc. (Hons) in Electronics
- Six-Semester based B.Sc. (Hons) in Geography
- Six-Semester based B.Sc. (Hons) in Biotechnology
- Six-Semester based B.Sc. (Hons) in Biochemistry
- Six-Semester based B.Sc. (Hons) in Bioinformatics
- Six-Semester based B.Sc. (Hons) in Clinical Biochemistry

=== Discontinuation of Integrated Courses ===
As of 2022, Sri Pratap College has discontinued its five-year integrated B.Sc.-M.Sc. programs in disciplines such as Zoology, Botany, and others. The last batch for these integrated programs graduated in 2022. This change aligns with the implementation of the National Education Policy (NEP) 2020, which emphasizes a more flexible and multidisciplinary approach to higher education.

=== Current Undergraduate Programs ===
In accordance with the NEP 2020, the college now offers four-year undergraduate programs with multiple exit options:

- Certificate: Awarded after completing 1 year (2 semesters) of study.
- Diploma: Granted after 2 years (4 semesters) of study.
- Bachelor Degree: Conferred upon completing a 3-year (6 semesters) program.
- Bachelors Degree with Honors: Achieved after a 4-year (8 semesters) program, which includes a rigorous research project in the chosen major area of study.

As of the 2024-2025 academic year, Sri Pratap College offers the following Bachelor of Science (B.Sc.) programs:

- B.Sc. in Physics: This program includes minors in subjects such as Botany, Biotechnology, Bioinformatics, Chemistry, Electronics, and others.
- B.Sc. in Botany: Students can choose minors from disciplines like Biochemistry, Biotechnology, Bioinformatics, Chemistry, Clinical Biochemistry, Information Technology, Environmental Science, Human Genetics, Water Management, Zoology, and English.
- B.Sc. in Chemistry: The program offers minors in areas including Biochemistry, Botany, Biotechnology, Bioinformatics, Clinical Biochemistry, Information Technology, Environmental Science, Geography, Geology, Human Genetics, Physics, Statistics, Water Management, Zoology, and English.
- B.Sc. in Environmental Science: Minors available include Biochemistry, Botany, Biotechnology, Bioinformatics, Chemistry, Clinical Biochemistry, Information Technology, Geography, Geology, Human Genetics, Physics, Statistics, Water Management, Zoology, and English.
- B.Sc. in Geology: Students can select minors from Botany, Bioinformatics, Biotechnology, Chemistry, Information Technology, Environmental Science, Geography, Physics, Statistics, Water Management, Zoology, and English.
- B.Sc. in Information Technology: This program includes minors in Botany, Biotechnology, Bioinformatics, Electronics, Physics, Statistics, IT Computer & Electronics, and Mathematics.

Each of these programs is structured to provide a comprehensive education in the major field of study, complemented by minors that allow for interdisciplinary learning.

== Departments ==
- Department of English
- PG Department of Biochemistry
- Department of Biotechnology
- PG Department of Botany
- PG Department of Chemistry
- Department of Electronics
- Department of Environment and Water Management
- PG Department of Environmental Sciences
- Department of Geography
- Department of Geology
- PG Department of Information Technology
- Department of Mathematics
- PG Department of Physics
- Department of Physical Education
- Department of Statistics
- PG Department of Zoology
- Department of Human Genetics
- Department of Bio Informatics
- Department of Clinical Biochemistry

IGNOU Study Centre: S.P. College IGNOU Study Centre (1209) is steaming ahead since its inception in 2004. At present, the centre provides counselling and guidance to number of UG and PG courses. During the current year, the student enrolment has touched 4000 making an increase of staggering 90% and the number of programmes offered has also risen to 39. This centre has a distinction of holding practical sessions for students in all science streams and conducting all types of examinations. This centre also holds distinction in actuating highly market oriented courses in PG Analytical Chemistry, GIS & Remote Sensing, etc.

== Postage stamp ==
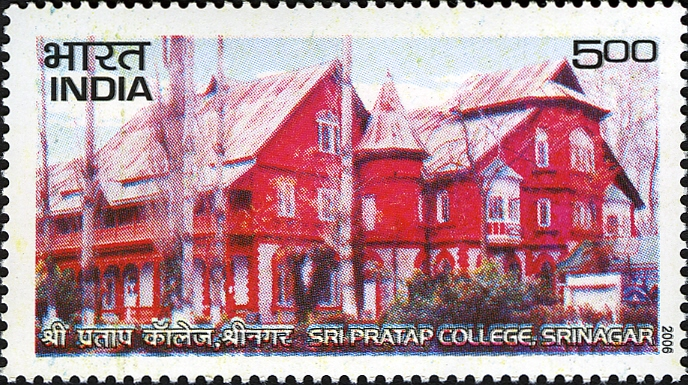
Heritage Building on a 2006 stamp of India

On 15 June 2006, India Post released a commemorative postage stamp on Sri Pratap College. The stamp depicted the heritage building of the college.

== Notable alumni ==
- Amanullah Khan
- Karan Singh
- Mirza Hassan Khan
- Rafiq Ahmad Pampori
- Ramanand Sagar: Celebrated Indian film director.
- Rehman Rahi: Renowned Kashmiri poet and winner of the Jnanpith Award.
- Mufti Mohammad Sayeed: Former Chief Minister of Jammu and Kashmir.
- Om Prakash Malhotra
- Sheikh Abdullah: Former Chief Minister of Jammu and Kashmir.
- Yasin Malik
- Ashfaq Majeed Wani
- Thakur Prithi Chand

== Architecture ==
The main building of Sri Pratap College is designated a heritage structure.
