= University of Kashmir =

State University in Srinagar, India

- Motto: From Darkness to Light
- Type: Public
- Established: 1948; 78 years ago
- Parent institution: Government of Jammu and Kashmir
- Accreditation: NAAC Grade A++
- Academic affiliations: UGC, AICTE, NAAC, AIU, ACU
- Chancellor: Lieutenant Governor of Jammu and Kashmir
- Vice-Chancellor: Nilofer Khan
- Students: 100,000+
- Location: Srinagar, Jammu and Kashmir, India; 34°07′57″N 74°50′15″E
- Campus: 400; Urban, 247 acres (1.00 km^{2})
- Language: English, Kashmiri, Urdu
- Website: uok.edu.in

University of Kashmir (UoK), informally known as Kashmir University (KU), is a public state university located in the Hazratbal neighbourhood, on the western side of Dal Lake in the city of Srinagar, in Jammu and Kashmir, India, which was established in 1948.

The university offers undergraduate, postgraduate and doctoral programs in the fields of liberal arts, business, commerce & management studies, education, law, applied sciences & Technology, biological sciences, physical & material sciences, social sciences, medicine, dentistry, engineering, oriental learning, and music & fine arts. It was awarded Grade "A++" by the NAAC in June 2025. It was awarded rank 34 among universities in India by NIRF ranking 2025.

== History ==
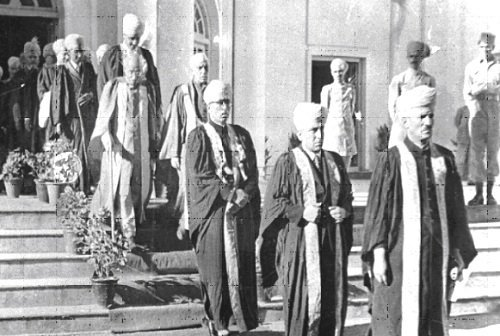
1951: The first convocation procession of the University of Jammu & Kashmir led by Ghulam Ahmad Ashai, the registrar. He is followed by the vice-chancellor, Wazir Janki Nath (chief justice), Sheikh Abdullah (prime minister of J&K), Pandit Nehru (prime minister of India), C. Rajagopalachari (the governor-general of India) and Karan Singh (the yuvraj at the time).

The inception of the University of Kashmir dates back to the establishment of Jammu and Kashmir University in 1948. In 1969, it was made into two full-fledged universities: University of Kashmir at Srinagar and University of Jammu at Jammu.

The University of Kashmir, since its establishment, has been focused at Hazratbal and encompasses three adjacent areas: Amar Singh Bagh, Naseem Bagh and Mirza Bagh. This campus is spread over 263 acres (1.06 km^{2}). It is the largest university by a number of full-time students in the union territory of Jammu and Kashmir.

A major part of Amar Singh Bagh and Naseem Bagh constitute the Hazratbal campus which is laid out on the northeastern bank of Dal Lake. Earlier, many postgraduate departments, research and other centres were housed in Naseem Bagh Campus. But the university resolved to develop Naseem Bagh into a heritage site and, thereafter, many departments were shifted to other areas of the Hazratbal campus. As of 6 July 2025 2025, Zakura Campus, which was being developed on 300 kanals of land in close proximity to Hazratbal campus to meet expansion requirements of the university, consists of the University's largest engineering academic hub i.e. Institute of Technology (IOT), which offers four-year B.Tech courses in Civil, Mechanical, Electronics and Communication, Electrical Engineering, 2 year M.Tech in E&C, Electrical and Mechanical and 4-Year B.S. through Design Your Degree, followed by other campuses which are also providing several PG/Integrated/UG Courses. Mirza Bagh or "University Town" constitutes buildings housing quarters for the university staff.

The idea of extending postgraduate programmes to colleges and establishing new campuses at Anantnag and Baramulla was conceived by the then Vice Chancellor Prof Raees Ahmad in 2002. He mobilised over 300 million for the development of the university from the prime minister's fund for the overall development of the main campus and the establishment of the new campuses. The foundation stones were laid by Mufti Muhammad Sayeed and the plans of buildings were approved. The locations of the campuses had to be changed because of likely floods. After Prof Tareen the development of campuses took a long time and became operational in 2008/2009. The new social science block, the life science block, the examination block, the humanities block, the distance education block, the media block and many other buildings were constructed in 2001 and 2004 during Prof Tareen's period out of the PMs special fund. The 200-capacity convention centre was also completed.

The South Campus established on 259 kanals of land at Fateh Garh, Anantnag was started in October 2008. The North Campus on 559 kanals at Delina, Baramulla was started in December 2009. One Campus at Kupwara is also established and functional, as of 2025. Post-2019, Kargil and Leh Campuses were merged with the University of Ladakh.

== Present form ==
There are 14 schools, more than 50 academic departments, 21 centres, 36 colleges and six (privately managed) recognised institutes spread all over the state. The two largest departments in student enrolment include the School of Law and the School of Business Studies.

The School of Law, being one of the oldest academic departments, runs four full time academic programmes 3-Year LL.B (Hons.), 5-Year Integrated B.A.LL.B (Hons.), 2-Year LLM and Integrated Ph.D. The School's student body, "Law Society," actively organises debates, seminars, and moot court competitions. The School publishes a refereed research journal, Kashmir University Law Review (KULR).

The School of Business Studies consists of four academic departments, the largest one being the Department of Management Studies, which offers academic programmes like Integrated MBA, MBA-FM and MBA.

The other academic departments/research centers offer a variety of academic programmes through PG/UG/Integrated at Main and other satellite sampuses to meet the demand of the student community.

== Campus ==
The university has 247 acres campus in Hazratbal. To make education more accessible to people living in remote areas of Kashmir Valley, the university has established satellite campuses at Zakura Campus (Zakura, Srinagar), North Campus (Delina, Baramulla), South Campus (Fatehgarh, Anantnag) and Kupwara Campus (Wayan, Kupwara).

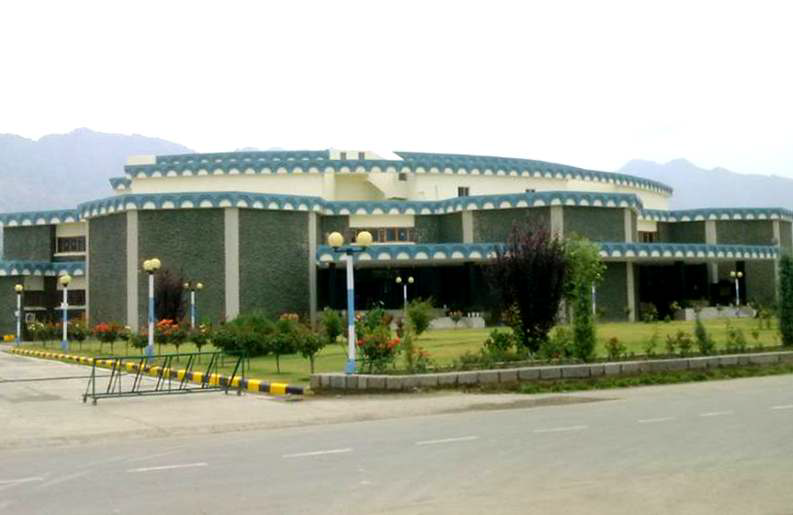
University Convocation Complex (December 2011)

=== Library ===
The university has a central library called Allama Iqbal Library. It is headed by the university librarian. It has a collection of over 600,000 books including 415 rare manuscripts. It was established to cater to the needs of scholars, researchers and students of the university. With the split of the university in 1969, the library was shared by the two universities (University of Kashmir and University of Jammu).

=== Hostels ===
The university provides residential facilities on a first-come-first-served basis to the teaching and non-teaching staff at Main Campus and Mirza Bagh Campus, as well as to students at the following-mentioned places. The hostels (boys'/girls') located at the Main as well as Zakura Campus, are directly supervised by the concerned Provost Office, while as those falling under the other satellite campuses are supervised and managed by the Hostel Allotment Committee of the concerned satellite campus.

In 2020, the varsity enacted a new hostel accommodation-cum-residential policy, superseding the previous 2018 policy.

==== Boys' hostels ====
- International Gani Kashmiri Hostel (Main Campus)
- Mehboob-ul-Aalam Hostel (Main Campus)
- Maulana Anwar Shah Kashmiri Hostel (Main Campus)
- Gani Kashmiri Hostel for Research Scholars (Zakura Campus)
- Shaikh-ul-Alam Boys (A) and (B) Hostels (Zakura Campus)
- Syed Meerak Shah Hostel (Zakura Campus)

==== Girls' hostels ====
- Habba Khatoon Hostel (Main Campus)
- Rabia Basiri Hostel (Main Campus)
- Qurat-ul-Aen Hostel (Main Campus)
- Bibi Amina Hostel (Main Campus)
- Lal Ded Hostel (Main Campus)

== Affiliated colleges ==
The University of Kashmir has 45 affiliated and 21 constituent colleges.

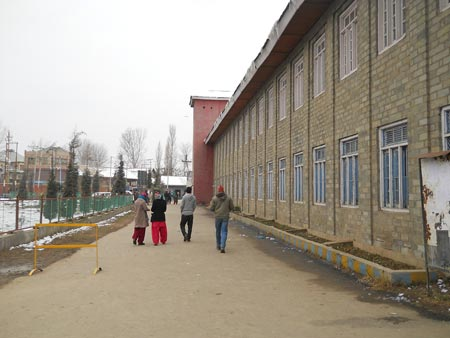
Side view of the main building of Government Degree College, Sopore

Constituent colleges

- Government Medical College, Srinagar
- Government Medical College, Handwara, Kupwara
- Government Medical College, Anantnag
- Government Medical College, Baramulla
- Government Dental College and Hospital, Srinagar
- Government College of Education, M.A. Road, Srinagar
- Institute of Music & Fine Arts, Srinagar
- Government College of Physical Education, Ganderbal
- DOEACC, Rangreth Srinagar
- Composite Regional Centre, Bemina By-pass, Srinagar
- S.S.M. College of Engineering, Pattan, Baramulla
- Kashmir Law College, Nowshera, Srinagar
- Vitasta School of Law & Humanities, Nowgam, Srinagar
- Sopore Law College, Sopore, Baramulla
- KCEF Law College, Payer Road, Pulwama
- Institute of Asian Medical Science Unani, Zakura, Srinagar
- Bibi Haleema College of Nursing and Medical Technology, Srinagar
- Kashmir Tibbia College, Hospital and Research Centre, Saida Kadal, Srinagar
- Kausar College of Computer Science, Nowshera, Srinagar
- S.E.M College of Education, Computer Science, Management Studies and Training, New Airport (IG) Road, Humhama, Budgam
- Max-Well College of Computer Science, Pulwama
- Iqbal Institute of Technology and Management, Laloo Sheshgaribagh, Hyderpora, Srinagar
- CASET College of Computer Science, Near Gole Market, Karan Nagar, Srinagar
- Master Institute of Information Technology, Pulwama
- Kashmir College of Engineering & Technology, Ranbirgarh, Srinagar

Permanently affiliated government colleges

- Islamia College of Science and Commerce, Srinagar
- Government College for Women, Anantnag
- Government College for Women, Baramulla
- Government College for Women, Nawakadal Srinagar
- Government Degree College for Boys, Anantnag
- Government Degree College, Bemina
- Government Degree College, Kupwara
- Government Degree College, Sogam lolab
- Government Degree College, Handwara
- Government Degree College, Sopore
- Government Degree College, Pulwama
- Government Degree College, Tral
- Government Degree College, Shopian
- Government Degree College, Ganderbal
- Government Degree College, Kulgam
- Government Degree College, Kelam
- Government Degree College, Doru
- Government Degree College, Pattan
- Government Degree College, Beerwah
- Government Degree College, Uri
- Government Degree College, Bijbehara
- Government Degree College, Budgam
- Government Degree College, Bandipora
- Government Degree College for Women, Sopore
- Government Model Degree College Tangmarg Gulmarg
- Vishwa Bharti Women's College, Srinagar
- Government Degree College, Bomai Sopore

== Organisation and administration ==
=== Core administrative officers ===
Section 9 of the Kashmir and Jammu Universities Act, 1969 (Act. No. XXIV of 1969) enumerates the university officers, namely the chancellor, pro-chancellor, vice‑chancellor, pro‑vice‑chancellor (if any), financial advisor, registrar, controller of examinations, joint registrar (if any), and other officers the statutes may prescribe

- Chancellor: The university is headed by the lieutenant‑governor of the UT of J&K, who presides over University Council and convocations, and confirms honorary degrees.
- Pro-chancellor: The chief minister, Government of J&K, acts as ex-officio pro‑chancellor. In the chancellor’s absence, he/she presides over Council/convocations. He/she holds inspection/inquiry powers into university affairs and may direct corrective actions.
- Vice-chancellor (VC) The vice-chancellor is the principal executive and academic officer of the university, who is appointed by the chancellor in consultation with the pro‑chancellor from names recommended by a selection committee. Section 13 establishes the vice‑chancellor as the university’s principal executive and academic officer, chairing the Academic Council and other bodies in the absence of the chancellor and pro‑chancellor, and vested with authority to convene meetings, ensure compliance with all statutes and regulations, make necessary appointments, manage discipline, take emergency action, enforce decisions of statutory bodies, and delegate powers as prescribed.
- Pro-vice-chancellor (PVC): Section 15 and related provisions confer on the pro‑vice‑chancellor such powers as may be assigned by the VC or can be prescribed in the statutes and regulations, always under the VC’s control. For a very long time, no one has been appointed as the PVC; the position has been remained vacant.
- Financial advisor: Section 16 designates the Administrative Secretary, Department of Finance, Government of J&K (or his/her nominee), as the ex-officio financial advisor to the University, who supervises university finances, advises on budgetary policy, presents annual estimates and accounts, and may undertake additional duties prescribed by statutes.
- Registrar (Reg) The registrar is appointed by the University Council on the recommendation of a selection committee. As a full‑time officer, the Registrar acts as the secretary to all major university bodies (Council, Syndicate, Academic Council, faculties, boards, etc.), controls ministerial and technical staff under the VC’s sanction, handles university records and property, manages financial transactions (collecting funds, disbursing payments, signing cheques), issues meeting notices, and supports the vice‑chancellor in all administrative duties. The statutes and regulations may allow further duties, and the registrar may delegate powers with VC approval. To keep it simple, the registrar is the chief of administration of the university.
- Controller of examinations (COE or CE): Section 18 empowers the controller of examinations, also appointed by the University Council upon a selection committee’s recommendation, as a full‑time officer responsible for the complete conduct of examinations. He heads the Examination Wing of the University which includes setting, printing, and safeguarding question papers, overseeing examination logistics (dispatch, evaluation, result publication), managing complaints and unfair means cases, and performing statutory duties under the VC’s direction.

The Act also enumerates the key administrative Authorities of the universities - the University Council, the Syndicate, the Academic Council, Schools (formerly "Faculties"), Boards of Studies, Board of Inspection and Board of Research Studies, and other Statutory bodies. Section 22 establishes the University Council as the supreme policy-making body, endowed with powers to draft statutes (in consultation with the Syndicate), approve financial estimates and developmental plans, review annual reports, appoint senior officers and teachers, establish committees, delegate powers, and execute any additional functions provided under the Act or Statutes. Other than those mentioned in the Act, the university has:

- Dean of Academic Affairs (DAA): Under the overall direction of the Vice‑Chancellor, the DAA is the senior most teacher of the University and acts as the nerve centre for all matters concerning academic environment and activity on the campus, assisted by a Joint/Deputy Registrar and assistantrRegistrar. He looks after the working of various teaching departments. He heads the Academic Section, and chairs certain academic committees in the VC’s absence. He has authority to process proposals for guest speakers, visiting fellows/professors, and faculty improvements. he co-signs academic MoUs and recommends statute amendments related to teaching programs. He oversees PG course affiliations.
- Dean of Research (DR): DR plays a central administrative leadership role, overseeing the university’s research agenda. He tracks progress of sponsored and institutional projects, manage budgets, supervise compliance (e.g., IRB, human/animal research, ethics), and coordinate pre/post-award processes. He also fosters ethical practices, research integrity, awareness of COI, safety, training, and overall compliance.
- Dean, College Development Council (DCDC): DCDC is another senior-most professor of the university, who is appointed by the vice‑chancellor, to look after the university’s College Development Council (CDC), which bridges the university, and its affiliated and/or constituent colleges, including their timely inspection and recognition. DCDC develops perspective plans for college openings, ensures minimum prescribed standards, and monitors UGC-mandated requirements.
- Director Finance/Chief Accounts Officer and Financial Advisor
- Proctorial Organization/Office of the Chief Proctor

=== Schools, departments, and research centers ===
- School of Applied Sciences and Technology (SoAST)
1. Department of Computer Science
2. Department of Electronics & Instrumentation Technology
3. Department of Food Science & Technology
4. Department of Pharmaceutical Science
5. Department of Information Technology and Support Systems (DITSS)
6. Institute of Home Science
- School of Arts, Language and Literature (SALL)
1. Department of Arabic
2. Department of English
3. Institute of Foreign Languages
4. Department of Hindi
5. Shri Pran Kishor Koul Institute of Music and Fine Arts
6. Department of Kashmiri
7. Department of Linguistics
8. Department of Persian
9. Department of Philosophy
10. Department of Sanskrit
11. Department of Urdu
- School of Biological Sciences
1. Department of Biochemistry
2. Department of Bioresources
3. Department of Biotechnology
4. Department of Botany
5. Department of Clinical Biochemistry
6. Centre of Research for Development
7. Department of Nano-technology
8. Department of Zoology
- School of Business Studies (SBS)
1. Department of Commerce
2. Department of Economics
3. Department of Management Studies
4. Department of Tourism, Hospitality & Leisure Studies
- School of Earth and Environmental Sciences (SESS)
1. Department of Earth Sciences
2. Department of Environmental Science
3. Department of Geography & Disaster Management
4. Department of Geoinformatics
- School of Education and Behavioural Sciences (SEBS)
1. Directorate of Physical Education and Sports
2. Department of Education
3. Department of Psychology
- School of Engineering (SOE)
1. Institute of Technology
- School of Law (Law)
1. Department of Law
- School of Open Learning (SOL)
1. Centre for Distance and Online Education
2. Directorate of Lifelong Learning and Skill Development
3. Educational Multimedia Research Centre
- School of Physical and Mathematical Sciences 1. Department of Chemistry 2. Department of Mathematics 3. Department of Physics 4. Department of Statistics
- School of Social Sciences (SSS)
1. Department of History
2. Department of Library and Information Sciences
3. Media Education Research Center (MERC)
4. Department of Political Science
5. Shah-i-Hamadan Institute of Islamic Studies
6. Department of Social Work
7. Department of Sociology
8. Institute of Kashmiri Studies
- Centers
1. Bio-informatics Centre
2. Centre for Capacity Building & Skill Development (CCBSD)
3. Centre for Innovation Incubation and Entrepreneurship (CIIE)
4. Centre for Interdisciplinary Research & Innovations (CIRI)
5. Centre for University Society Interface (CUSI)
6. Centre for Women's Studies & Research (CWSR)
7. Centre of Biodiversity & Taxonomy (CBT)
8. Centre of Central Asian Studies (CCAS)
9. Centre of Research for Development(CORD)
10. Educational Multimedia Research Centre (EMMRC)
11. Iqbal Institute of Culture and Philosophy (IICP)
12. UGC-Malaviya Mission Teacher Training Centre (MMTTC)
13. NewGen IEDC ( Incubation Centre)
14. Population Research Centre (PRC)
15. Shaikh-Ul-Aalam Centre for Multidisciplinary Studies (SACMS)

=== Directorates and other Important Bodies ===
- Directorate of Information Technology & Support Systems
- Centre for Distance and Online Education
- Directorate of Lifelong Learning and Skill Development
- Directorate of Physical Education & Sports
- Directorate of Internal Quality Assurance
- Centre for Career-Counselling, Coaching and Placement (CCCCP)
- University Landscape Development Division
- University Construction Division/Engineering Wing
- Directorate of Watch and Ward
- Directorate of Convocation Complex

== Academics ==
University of Kashmir offers more than 100 academic programmes across more than 10 streams at undergraduate, postgraduate and doctoral level. Under undergraduate programme, the university offers three-year Bachelor of Arts, Bachelor of Commerce, 3-Year Bachelor of Law and Bachelor of Science streams, four-year Bachelor of Technology and five-year integrated BA LLB courses in different specializations. Under postgraduate programme, the university offers two-year Master of Arts, Master of Business Administration, MBA-FM, Master of Social Work, Master of Commerce, Master of Technology, Master of Pharmacy and Master of Computer Applications courses. These courses are offered by different schools of specialisations which fall under their respective departments and faculties.

=== Merit scholarships ===
Students selected for admission to various courses/programmes in the university are eligible to receive two merit scholarships which are paid to the top two merit holders. Merit scholarship in favour of previous year paid students is granted on the basis of merit in the entrance test to the course. In the final year, it is awarded on the basis of merit in the M.A/ MSc/ M.Com./ MLIS Previous/ 1st & 2nd semester examination. The scholarship is granted from the date of admission to the course up to the last date of the examination, subject to a maximum period of 12 calendar months.

=== Research scholarships ===
There are six departmental scholarships in each Department/Research Centre awarded for research leading to the award of PhD/M.Phil. degrees in addition to contingency grant payable annually for meeting miscellaneous expenses. The amount of scholarship paid to each selected scholar is Rs 10000/= per month for the period of maximum three years.

=== Students aid ===
The university has adopted a scheme called "Student Aid Fund" under which financial assistance is extended to students, particularly the meritorious ones from low-income groups. The Kashmir University Alumni Association also provides financial assistance to students with poor economic backgrounds with preference given to students who are orphans.

=== Rankings ===
University rankings

General – international
- QS (Asia) (2023): 451-500

General – India
- NIRF (Overall) (2024): 69
- NIRF (Universities) (2024): 45
- QS (India) (2020): 56-60

Internationally, the University of Kashmir was ranked 451–500 in Asia in the QS World University Rankings for 2023. In India, the QS World University Rankings ranked the University of Kashmir 56–60 and the National Institutional Ranking Framework (NIRF) ranked it 69th overall and 45th among universities in 2024.

== Sports ==
The Directorate of Physical Education & Sports (DPE&S) was established in the university in the year 1948 with the objective of promoting sports culture among the youth for the overall development of personality. Since then, it has hosted various inter-university tournaments in various sports like water skiing, kayaking, canoeing, surfing, sailing, and dragon boating at zonal and national levels. The university students have also earned laurels to the university in International Winter Sports Championships. Adventure sports like mountaineering and trekking have also been introduced. Several training camps are also organised in the university to train the students pursuing different courses.

The university has cricket, hockey, football, volleyball, handball, baseball, tennis, and basketball courts/fields and gyms within the main campus, and is currently constructing a Multi-Purpose Indoor Hall

Currently, the Directorate is being looked after by a Coordinator - Dr. Surjeet Singh (Associate Professor), assisted by two Assistant Directors and technical staff.

== Notable alumni ==
- Mian Altaf Ahmed Larvi – Member of Parliament.
- Aga Syed Ruhullah Mehdi – Member of Parliament
- Agha Shahid Ali – Poet
- Ayub Thakur – political activist / physician
- Bilal Nazki – Chief Justice
- Farooq Kathwari – Businessman
- Farooq Nazki – Poet / Broadcaster
- Ghulam Nabi Azad – Politician
- Karan Singh – Politician /
- Mansoor Ahmad Mir – Judge
- Mehbooba Mufti – Politician
- Mirwaiz Umar Farooq – Politician / clergyman
- Syed Ali Shah Geelani – Politician
- Masarat Alam Bhat – politician
- Saifuddin Soz – Professor
- Syed Salahuddin – Preacher
- Sunanda Pushkar – Businesswoman
- Tarannum Riyaz – Writer
- Z. G. Muhammad – Writer
- Mohammad Yaqoob Mir – Judge
- Malik Sajad – Graphic novelist
- Irfan Mehraj – journalist and human rights activist

== See also ==
- University of Kashmir Convocation Complex
- Central University of Kashmir
- Cluster University of Srinagar
- National Institute of Technology, Srinagar
- Foreshore Road
