= Jammu =

City in Indian-administered Jammu and Kashmir

- City
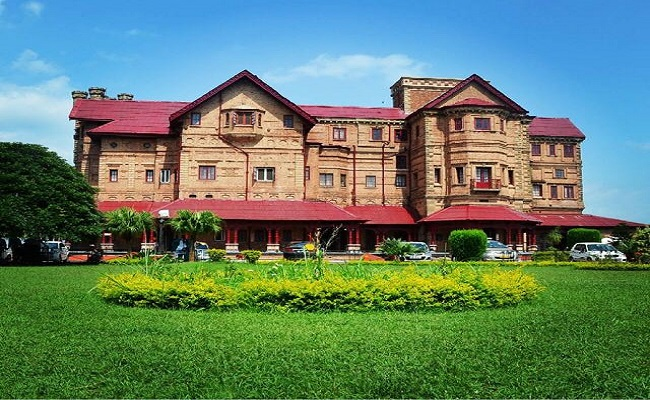
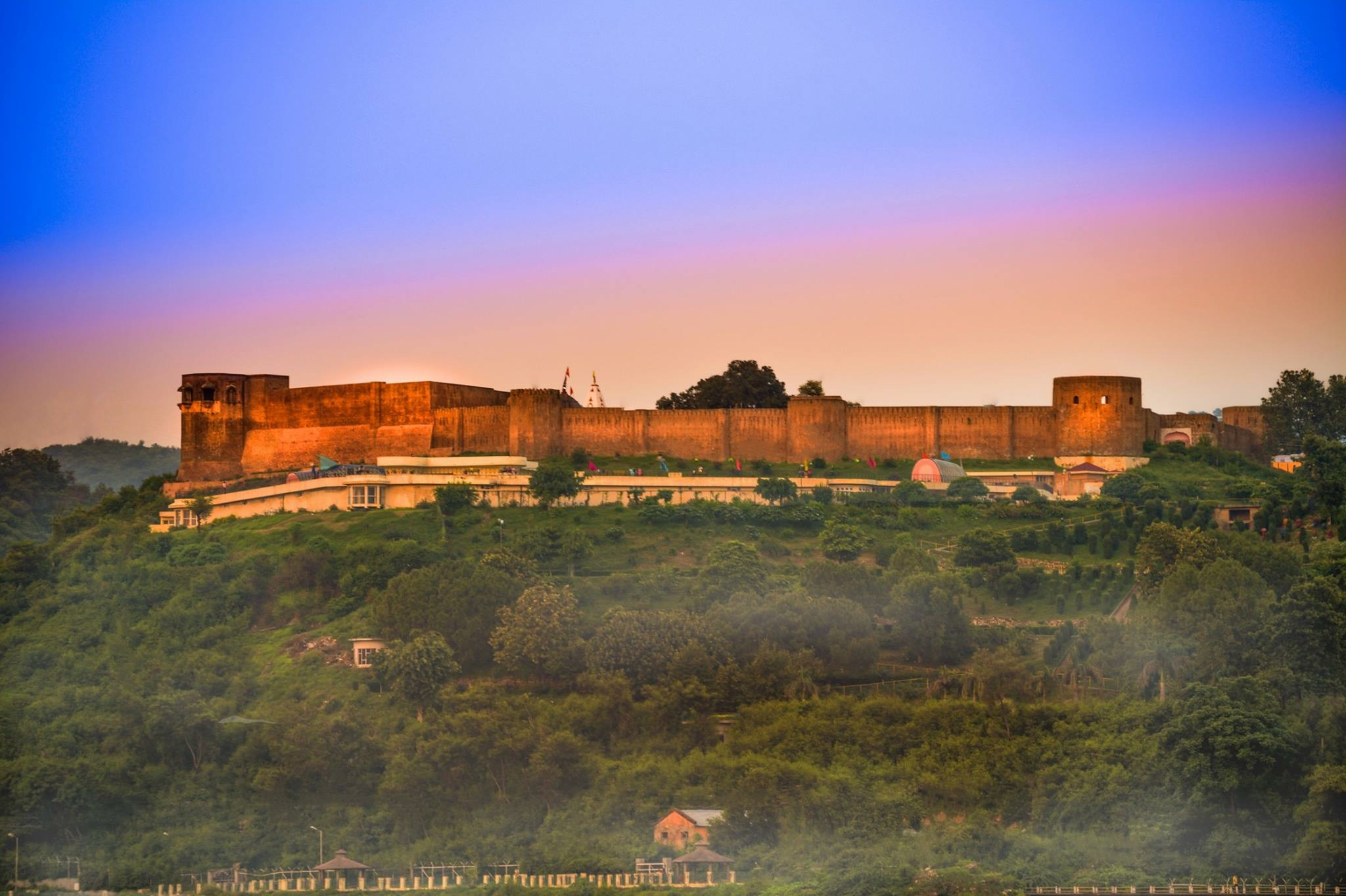
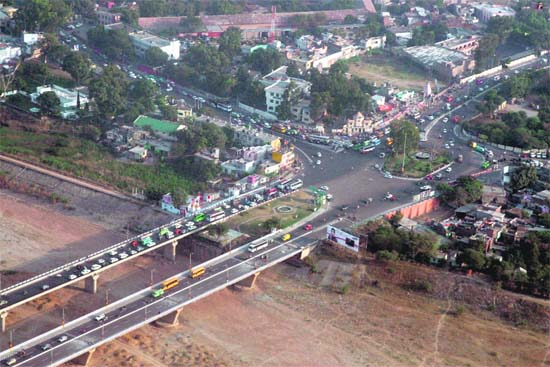
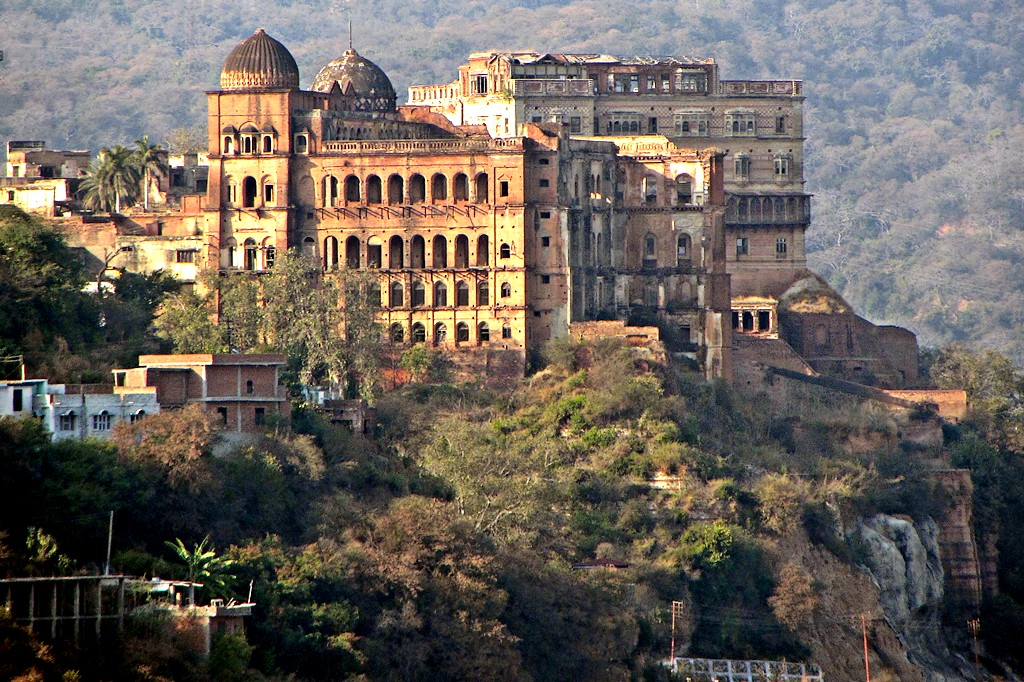
- Hari Niwas Palace Bahu Fort Tawi Bridge Mubarak Mandi Palace
- Nickname: City of Temples
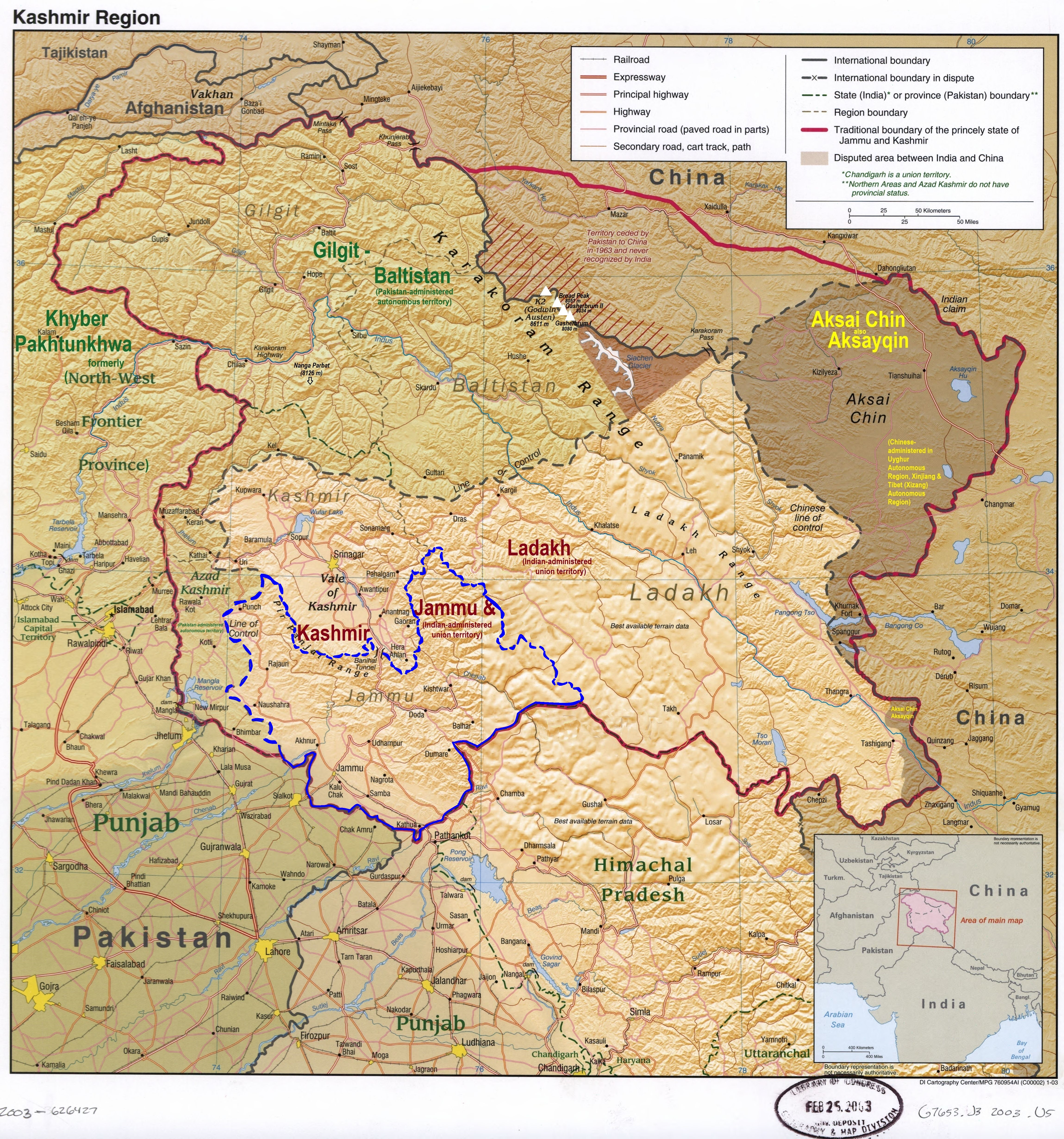
- Jammu lies in the Jammu division (neon blue) of the Indian-administered Jammu and Kashmir (shaded tan) in the disputed Kashmir region. (Note: The application of the term "administered" to the various regions of Kashmir and a mention of the Kashmir dispute is supported by several tertiary sources reflecting due weight in the coverage. Although "controlled" and "held" are also applied neutrally to the names of the disputants or to the regions administered by them, "held" is also considered politicised usage, as is the term "occupied".)
- Coordinates: 32.73°N 74.87°E
- Administering country: India
- Region of administration: Union territory of Jammu and Kashmir
- District: Jammu

Government
  - Type: Municipal Corporation
  - Body: Jammu Municipal Corporation and Jammu Development Authority
  - Mayor: Chander Mohan Gupta, BJP

Area
  - City: 240 km^{2} (93 sq mi)
- Elevation: 300–400 m (980–1,310 ft)

Population (2011)
  - City: 502,197
  - Rank: 94th
  - Density: 45/km^{2} (120/sq mi)
  - Metro: 657,314
- Demonym(s): Jammuwala, Jammuwale, Jammuites

Language
  - Official: Hindi, Dogri, Urdu, Kashmiri, English
  - Other: Punjabi
- Time zone: UTC+5:30 (IST)
- PIN: 180001
- Vehicle registration: JK-02
- Sex ratio: 867 ♀/ 1000 ♂
- Literacy: 90.14%
- Distance from Delhi: 575 km (357 mi) NW
- Distance from Mumbai: 1,971 km (1,225 mi) NE (land)
- Climate: Cwa (Köppen)
- Precipitation: 710 mm (28 in)
- Avg. summer temperature: 29.6 °C (85.3 °F)
- Avg. winter temperature: 17.7 °C (63.9 °F)
- Website: jammu.nic.in

Jammu (/ˈdʒʌmuː/) is a city in the Jammu division of Indian-administered Jammu and Kashmir. It serves as the winter capital of the union territory of Jammu and Kashmir. Lying on the banks of the river Tawi, the city of Jammu, with an area of 240 km^{2} (93 sq mi), is surrounded by the Himalayas in the north and the northern plains in the south.

Jammu is the second-most populous city of the union territory and is also known as the "City of Temples" for its numerous ancient Hindu temples.

== Etymology ==
According to local tradition, Jammu is named after its founder, Raja Jambulochan, who is believed to have ruled the area in the 9th century. Local tradition holds the city to be 3,000 years old but this is not supported by historians.

== History ==
According to Tarikh-i-Azmi, Jammu came into existence around 900 CE. The state of Durgara (modern forms "Duggar" and "Dogra)") is also attested from around this time. The capital of the Durgara state at that time is believed to have been Vallapura (identified with modern Billawar). Its rulers are repeatedly mentioned in Kalhana's Rajatarangini.Bamzai, P. N. K. (1994). Culture and Political History of Kashmir: Ancient Kashmir. M.D. Publications Pvt. Ltd. p. 184. ISBN 978-81-85880-31-0. Babbapura (modern Babor) is another state mentioned in Rajatarangini, some of whose rulers also appear by in the Vamshavali (family chronicles) of later Jammu rulers. These rulers are believed to have enjoyed almost independent status and allied themselves with the Sultans of Delhi.

Jammu is mentioned by name in the chronicles of Timur (r. 1370–1406), who invaded Delhi in 1398 and returned to Samarkand via Jammu. Raja Bhim Dev is prominently mentioned in the Delhi chronicles as a supporter of Mubarah Shah (r. 1421–1434) against Jasrat. Between 1423 and 1442, Jammu came under control of Jasrat (r. 1405–1442) who conquered it after killing his arch-enemy Bhim Dev in 1423. Later, Jasrat appointed Manik Dev (also known as Ajeo Dev) as vassal, and married his daughter. In the Mughal chronicles of Babur in the early 16th century, Jammu is mentioned as a powerful state in the Punjab hills. It is said to have been ruled by Manhas Rajputs. Emperor Akbar brought the hill kingdoms of the region under Mughal suzerainty, but the kings enjoyed considerable political autonomy. In addition to Jammu, other kingdoms of the region such as Kishtwar and Rajauri were also prominently mentioned. It is evident that the Mughal empire treated these hill chiefs as allies and partners in the empire.

=== Modern history ===
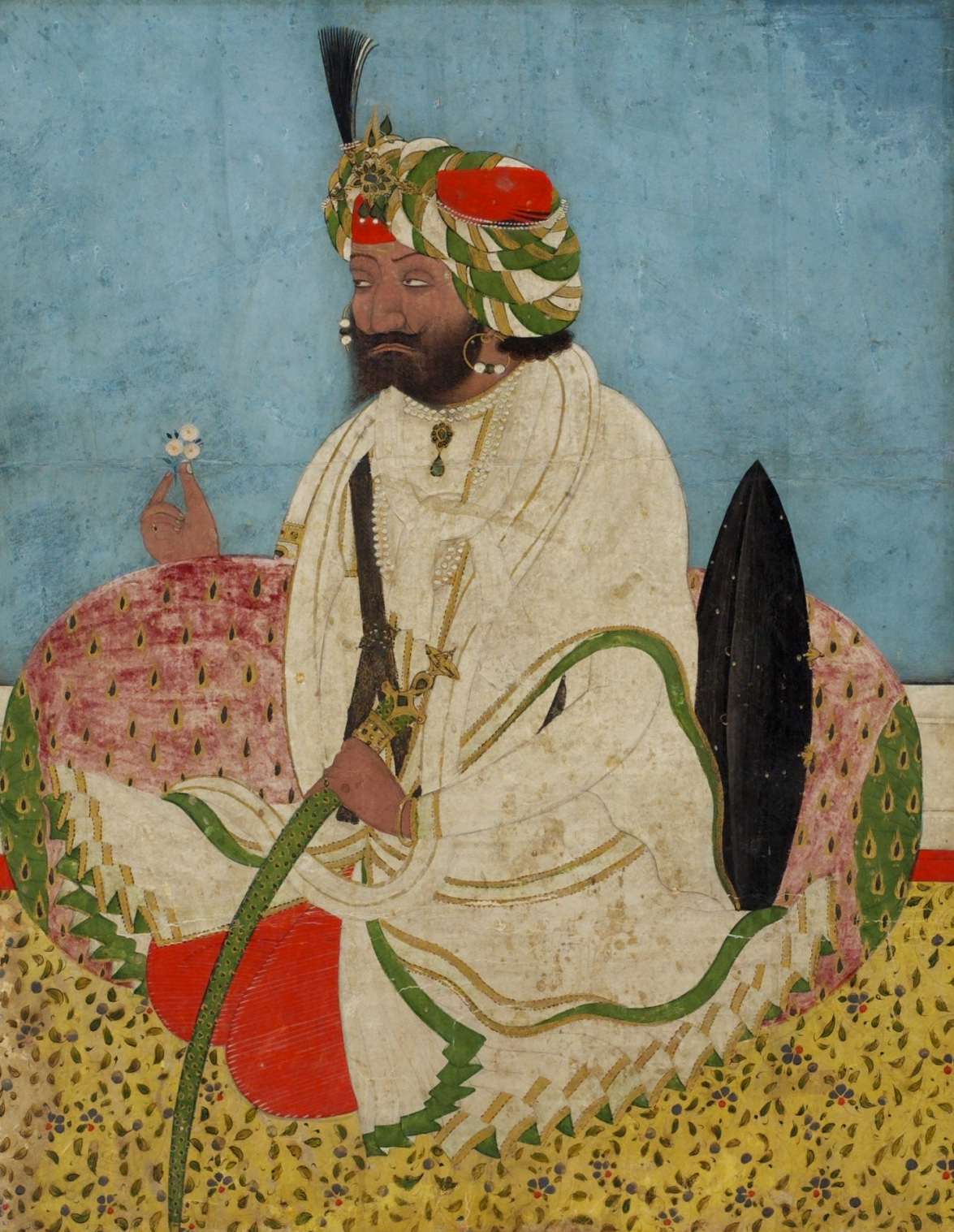
Maharaja Gulab Singh of Jammu and Kashmir

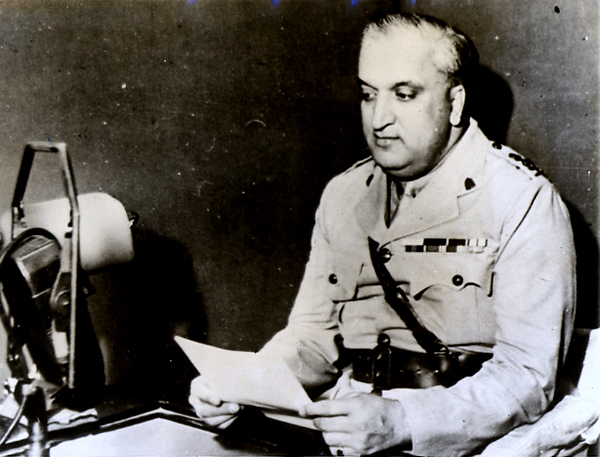
Maharaja of Kashmir, Hari Singh (1895–1961)

After the decline of the Mughal power in the 18th century, the Jammu state under Raja Dhruv Dev of the Jamuwal (Jamwal) family asserted its supremacy among the Dugar states. Its ascent reached its peak under his successor, Raja Ranjit Dev (r. 1728–1780), who was widely respected among the hill states. Ranjit Dev promoted religious freedom and security, which attracted many craftsmen and traders to settle in Jammu, contributing to its economic prosperity.

Towards the end of Ranjit Dev's rule, the Sikh clans of Punjab (misls) gained ascendency, and Jammu began to be contested by the Bhangi, Kanhaiya and Sukerchakia misls. Around 1770, the Bhangi misl attacked Jammu and forced Ranjit Dev to become a tributary. Brij Lal Dev, Ranjit Dev's successor, was defeated by the Sukerchakia chief Mahan Singh, who sacked Jammu and plundered it. Thus Jammu lost its supremacy over the surrounding country. In the Battle of Rumal, the Jammu ruler was killed by Sikhs.

In 1808, Jammu itself was annexed to the Sikh Empire by Ranjit Singh, the son of Mahan Singh. In 1818 Raja Kishore Singh, father of Raja Gulab Singh, was appointed and anointed the ruler of Jammu principality, and hence started the Jamwal dynasty, aka Dogra dynasty, which came to rule the princely state of Jammu and Kashmir under British suzerainty. The rulers built large temples, renovated old shrines, built educational institutes and many more. A 43 km (27 mi) long railway line connecting Jammu with Sialkot was laid in 1897

Jammu has historically been the capital of Jammu Province and the winter capital of the princely state of Jammu and Kashmir (1846–1952).

After the partition of India, Jammu continues as the winter capital of the Indian state of Jammu and Kashmir.

=== Battles ===
1. Battle of Jammu (1712)
2. Battle of Jammu (1774)
3. Battle of Rumal
4. Battle of Jammu (1808)

== Geography ==
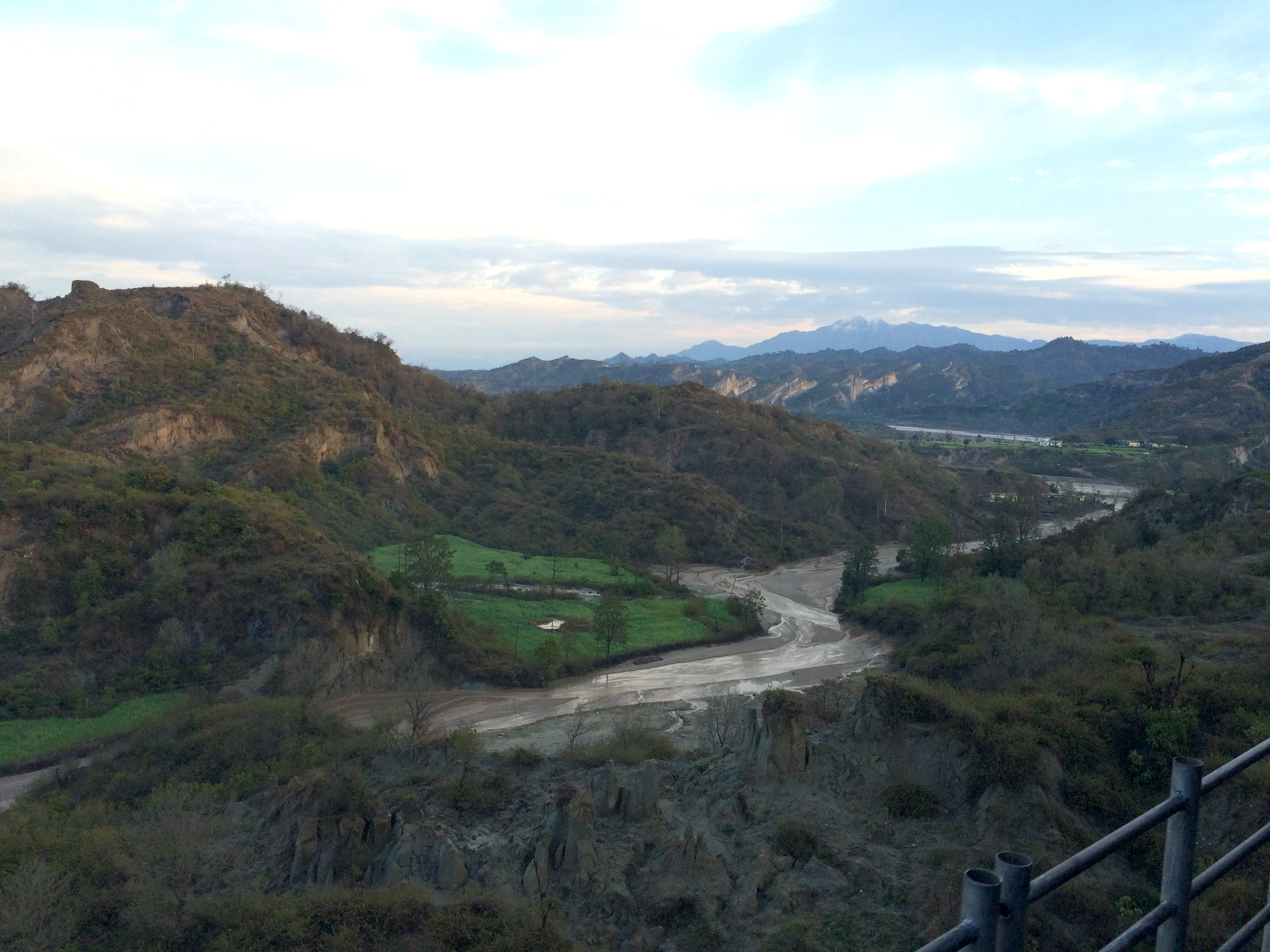
The Valley of Jammu

Jammu is located at 32.73°N 74.87°E. It has an average elevation of 300 m (980 ft). Jammu city is situated on a series of uneven ridges of low heights in the Shivalik hills. It is surrounded by the Shivalik range to the north, east, and southeast while the Trikuta Range borders it in the northwest. It is approximately 600 km (370 mi) from the national capital, New Delhi.

The city straddles the Tawi river. The old city overlooks the river from the north (right bank) while the new neighbourhoods are spread around the southern side (left bank) of the river. There are five bridges over the river.

== Climate ==
Jammu, like the rest of north-western India, features a humid subtropical climate (Köppen Cwa), with extreme summer highs reaching 46 °C (115 °F), and temperatures in the winter months occasionally falling below 4 °C (39 °F). June is the hottest month with average highs of 40.6 °C (105.1 °F), while January is the coldest month with average lows reaching 7 °C (45 °F). Average yearly precipitation is about 1,400 mm (55 in) with the bulk of the rainfall in the months from June to September, although the winters can also be rather wet. In winter dense fog causes much inconvenience and temperature even drops to 2 °C (36 °F). In summer, particularly in May and June, extremely intense sunlight or hot winds can raise the temperature to 46 °C (115 °F). Following the hot season, the monsoon lashes the city with heavy downpours along with thunderstorms; rainfall may total up to 669 mm (26.3 in) in the wettest months. The city is exposed to heatwaves.

Highest recorded temperature: 47.4 °C (117.3 °F) on 31 May 1988.

Lowest recorded temperature: 0.5 °C (32.9 °F) on 24 January 2016.

Jammu

Climate chart (precipitation, max. and min. temperature)
J	F	M	A	M	J	J	A	S	O	N	D
68 18 7	75 22 10	64 27 15	41 33 20	23 38 24	110 38 26	417 34 26	403 33 25	145 33 23	24 31 18	12 26 13	22 21 9
- █ Average max. and min. temperatures in °C
- █ Precipitation totals in mm
Imperial conversion
J	F	M	A	M	J	J	A	S	O	N	D
2.7 65 45	2.9 71 50	2.5 80 58	1.6 91 67	0.9 100 76	4.3 101 79	16 94 78	16 92 77	5.7 91 74	0.9 88 65	0.5 80 55	0.9 70 48
- █ Average max. and min. temperatures in °F
- █ Precipitation totals in inches

Climate data for Jammu (1991–2020, extremes 1925–2020)
Month	Jan	Feb	Mar	Apr	May	Jun	Jul	Aug	Sep	Oct	Nov	Dec	Year
Record high °C (°F)	28.0 (82.4)	31.7 (89.1)	37.3 (99.1)	43.9 (111.0)	47.4 (117.3)	47.2 (117.0)	45.0 (113.0)	41.7 (107.1)	39.2 (102.6)	37.9 (100.2)	34.2 (93.6)	28.5 (83.3)	47.4 (117.3)
Mean daily maximum °C (°F)	18.1 (64.6)	21.5 (70.7)	26.6 (79.9)	32.7 (90.9)	37.6 (99.7)	38.3 (100.9)	34.3 (93.7)	33.1 (91.6)	32.8 (91.0)	31.1 (88.0)	26.4 (79.5)	21.1 (70.0)	29.5 (85.1)
Daily mean °C (°F)	12.7 (54.9)	15.9 (60.6)	20.6 (69.1)	26.2 (79.2)	31.0 (87.8)	32.2 (90.0)	29.9 (85.8)	29.0 (84.2)	28.0 (82.4)	24.8 (76.6)	19.7 (67.5)	14.9 (58.8)	23.7 (74.7)
Mean daily minimum °C (°F)	7.3 (45.1)	10.2 (50.4)	14.5 (58.1)	19.7 (67.5)	24.3 (75.7)	26.1 (79.0)	25.5 (77.9)	24.9 (76.8)	23.2 (73.8)	18.4 (65.1)	13.0 (55.4)	8.7 (47.7)	18.0 (64.4)
Record low °C (°F)	0.5 (32.9)	1.1 (34.0)	4.4 (39.9)	8.5 (47.3)	9.8 (49.6)	16.6 (61.9)	14.0 (57.2)	15.0 (59.0)	15.0 (59.0)	11.3 (52.3)	6.1 (43.0)	0.9 (33.6)	0.5 (32.9)
Average rainfall mm (inches)	67.9 (2.67)	74.6 (2.94)	64.1 (2.52)	41.4 (1.63)	22.5 (0.89)	109.5 (4.31)	416.5 (16.40)	403.1 (15.87)	144.8 (5.70)	23.5 (0.93)	12.2 (0.48)	21.9 (0.86)	1,401.9 (55.19)
Average rainy days	3.5	4.3	4.3	2.8	2.4	6.0	13.2	12.3	6.0	1.6	0.9	1.5	59.0
Average relative humidity (%) (at 17:30 IST)	66	57	51	38	31	41	66	72	68	58	63	69	57
Source: India Meteorological Department

== Transport ==
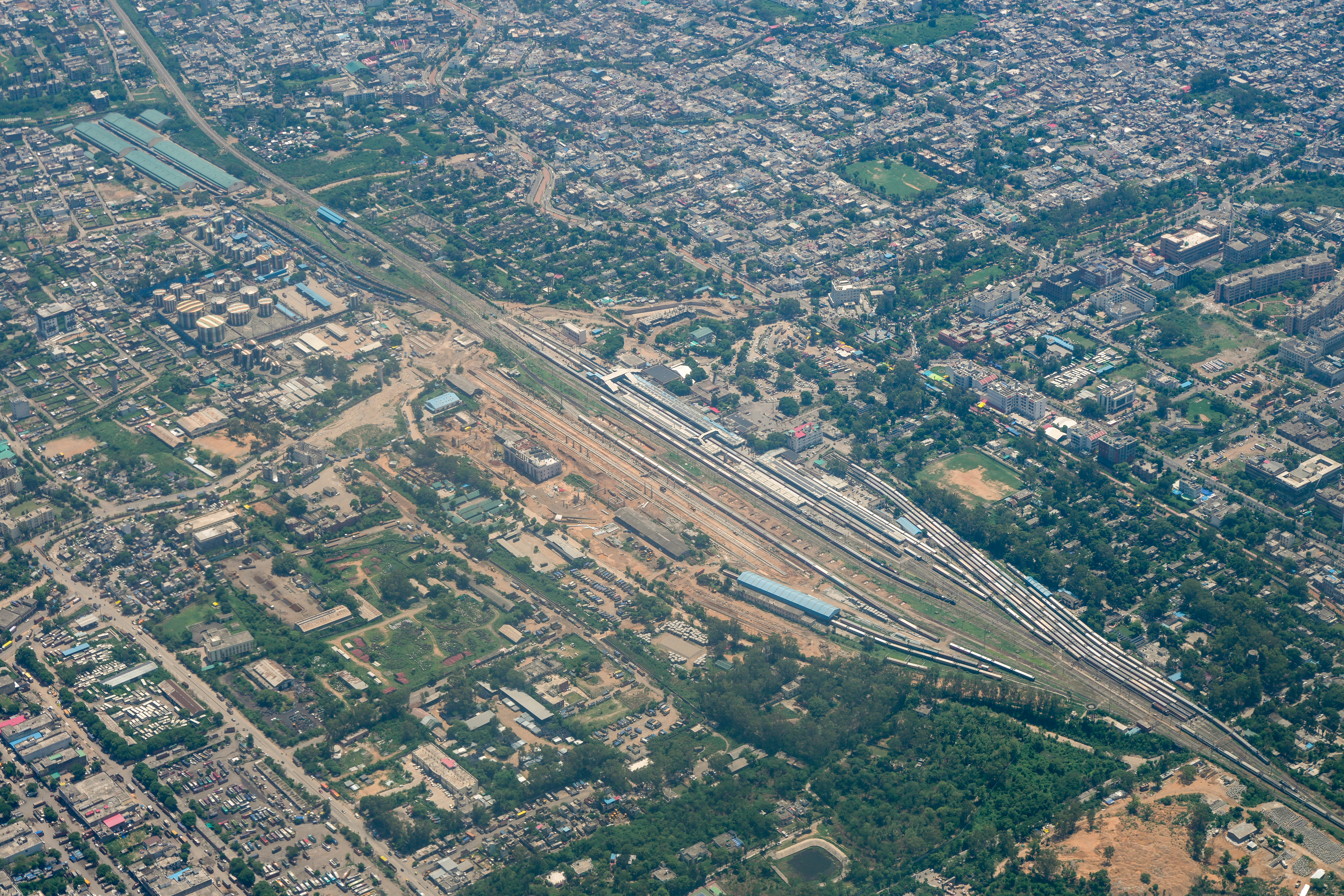
Aerial view of Jammu Tawi station

Jammu city has a railway station called Jammu Tawi (station code JAT) that is connected with major cities of India. The old railway link to Sialkot was suspended by Pakistan in September 1947, and Jammu had no rail services until 1971, when the Indian Railways laid the Pathankot-Jammu Tawi Broad Gauge line. The new Jammu Tawi station opened in October 1972 and is an origination point for express trains. With the commencement of the Jammu–Baramulla line, all trains to the Kashmir Valley will pass through Jammu Tawi. A part of the Jammu–Baramulla project has been executed and the track has been extended to Katra. Jalandhar - Pathankot-Jammu Tawi section has been doubled and electrified.

In January 2025, the Jammu Division of Indian Railways was inaugurated. The new division will create employment opportunities, infrastructure development, promote tourism and lead to overall socio-economic development of the region.

National Highway 44 which passes through Jammu connects it to the Kashmir Valley. National Highway 1B connects Jammu with Poonch town. Jammu is 80 km (50 mi) from Kathua town, while it is 68 km (42 mi) from Udhampur city. The famous pilgrimage town of Katra is 49 km (30 mi) from Jammu.

Jammu Airport is in the middle of Jammu. It has direct flights to Srinagar, Delhi, Amritsar, Chandigarh, Leh, Mumbai and Bengaluru. Jammu Airport operates daily 30 arrival and departure of flights which are served by Air India, SpiceJet, and IndiGo.

The city has JKSRTC city buses and minibusses for local transport which run on some defined routes. These minibusses are called "Matadors". Besides this auto-rickshaw and cycle-rickshaw service is also available. Local taxis are also available.

== Administration ==
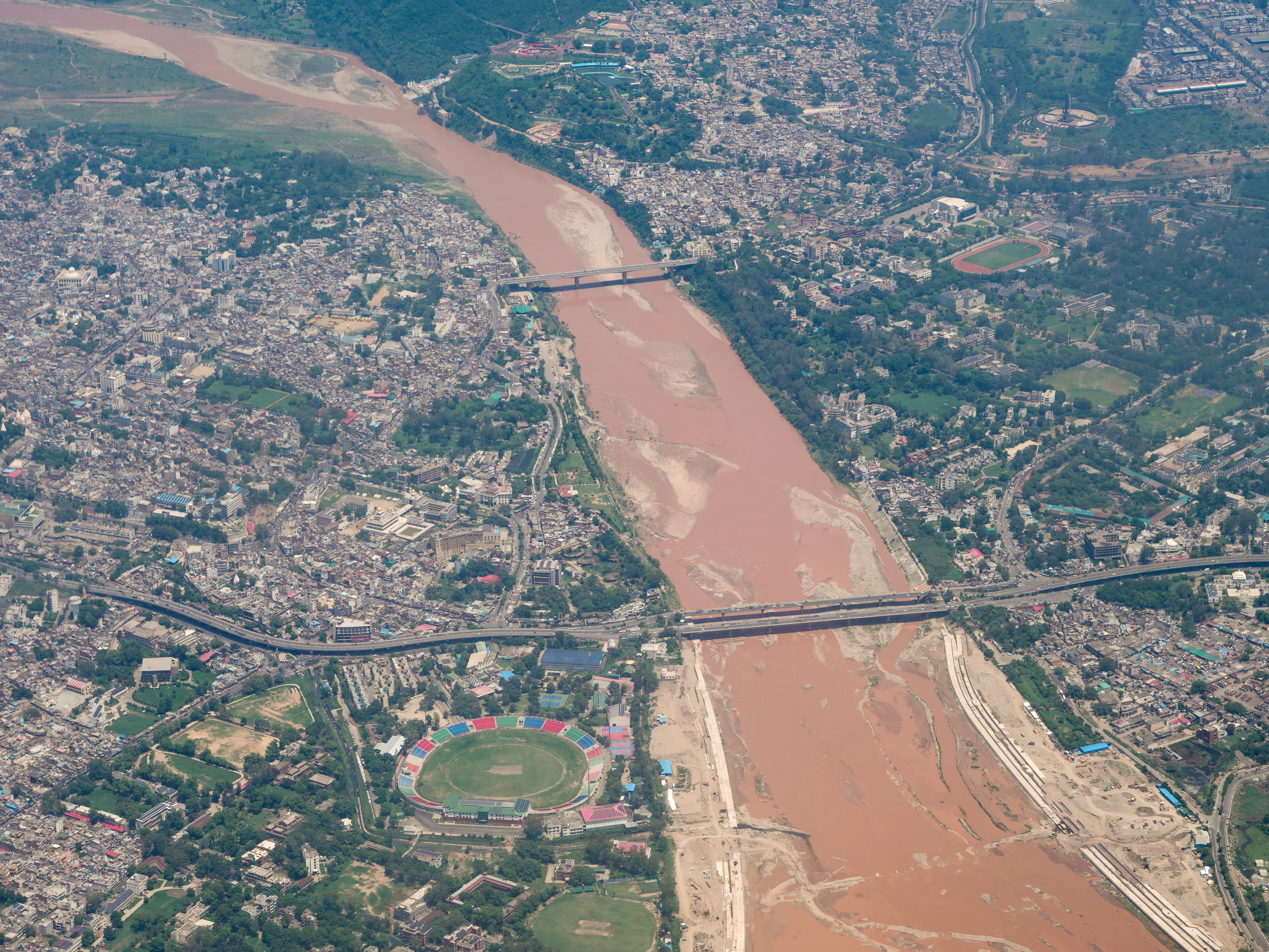
Aerial view of Jammu city and Tawi river

Jammu city serves as the winter capital of Jammu and Kashmir state from November to April when all the offices move from Srinagar to Jammu. Srinagar serves as the summer capital from May to October. Jammu was a municipal committee during 2001 census of India, but after 5 September 2003, it upgraded its status to a municipal corporation.

== Economy ==
Jammu city is the main cultural and economic centre of the administrative division of Jammu. A famous local basmati rice is produced in the RS Pura area near Jammu, and processed in rice mills in Jammu. The industrial estate at Bari Brahamna has a large presence of industrial units manufacturing a variety of products including carpets and electronic goods.

== Tourism ==
Tourism is the largest industry in Jammu city. It is also a focal point for the pilgrims going to Vaishno Devi and Kashmir valley as it is second last railway terminal in North India. All the routes leading to Kashmir, Poonch, Doda and Laddakh start from Jammu city. So throughout the year, the city remains full of people from all the parts of India. Places of interest include old historic palaces like Mubarak Mandi Palace, Purani Mandi, Rani Park, Amar Mahal, Bahu Fort, Raghunath Temple, Ranbireshwar Temple, Karbala, Peer Meetha, Old city.

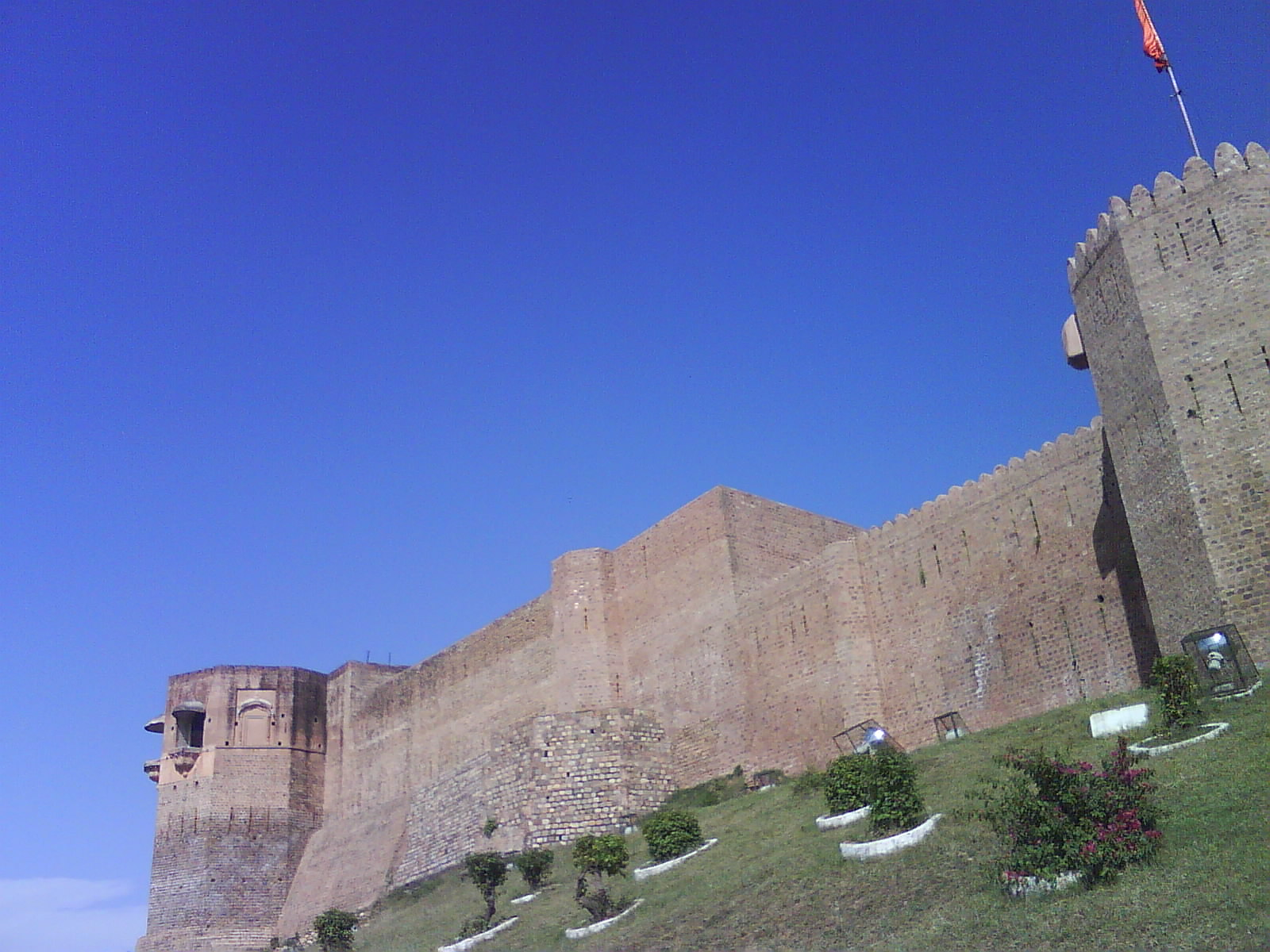
Bahu Fort

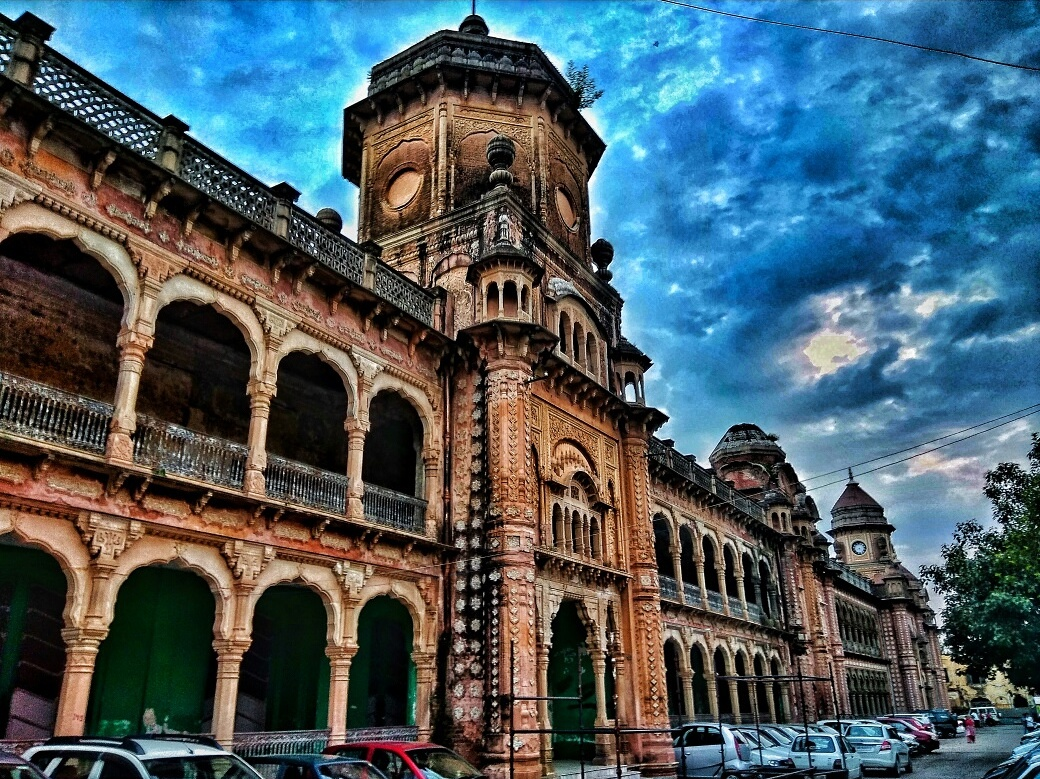
Mubarak Mandi Palace

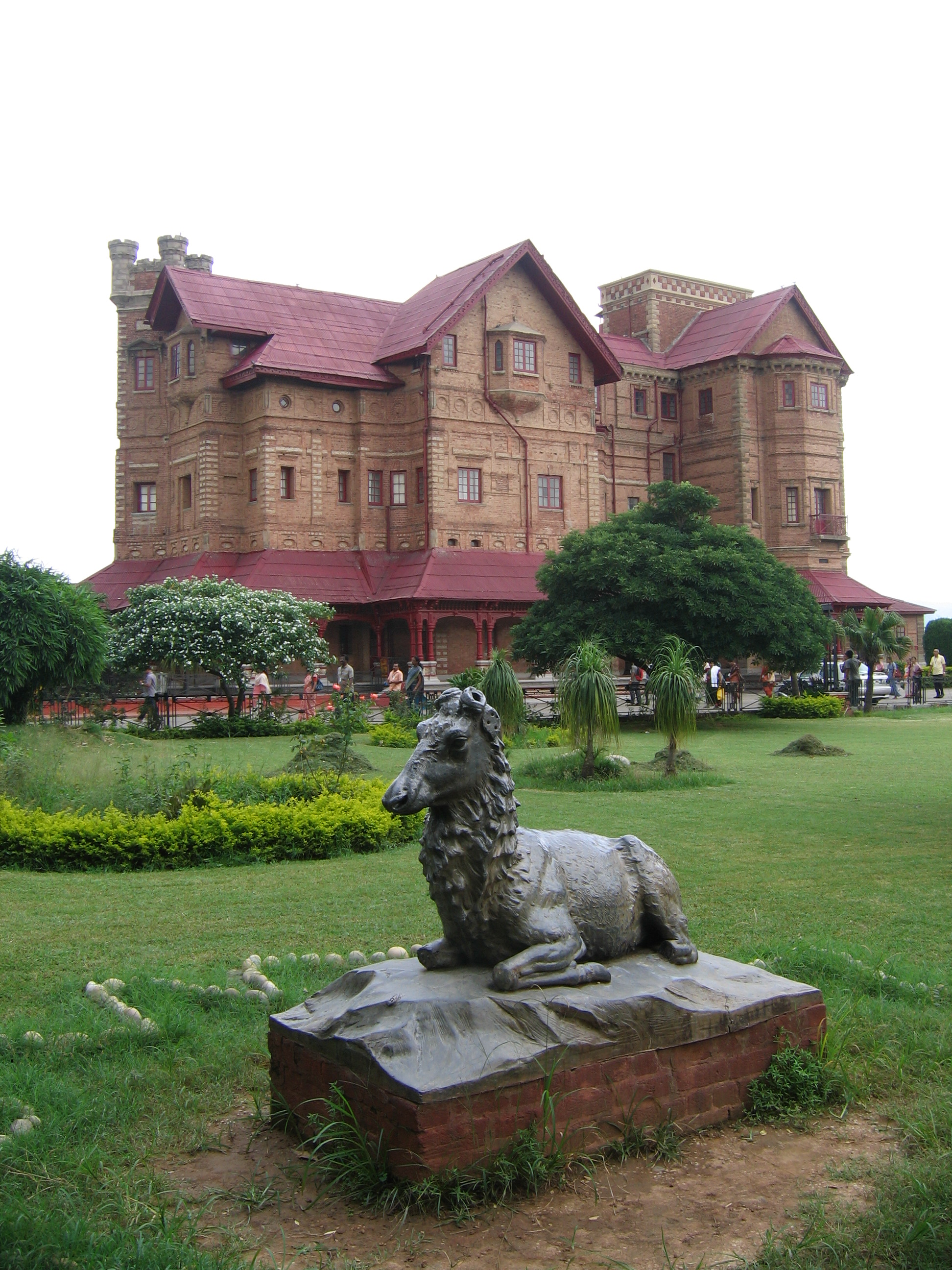
Amar Mahal

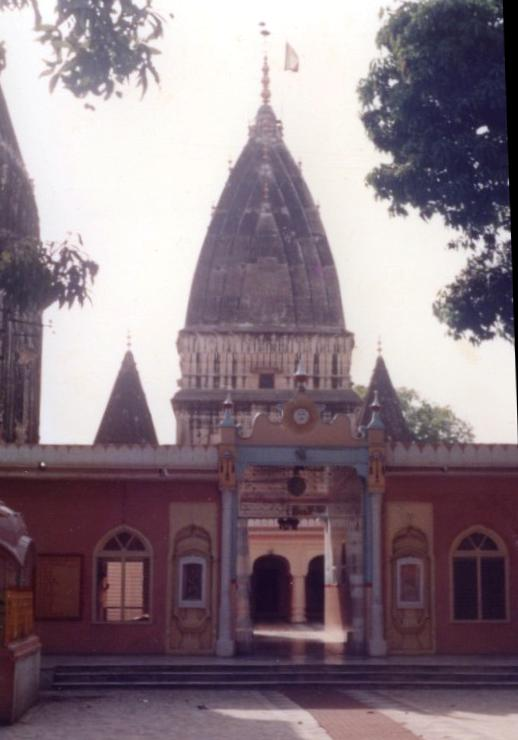
Raghunath Temple

== Demographics ==
Religion in Jammu City
Religion	Percent
Hinduism	81.19%
Sikhism	8.83%
Islam	7.95%
Christianity	1.35%
Others	0.28%

As of 2011 census, the population of Jammu city was 502,197. Males constituted 52.7% of the population; females numbered constituted 47.3% of the population. The sex ratio was 898 females per 1,000 males against the national average of 940. Jammu had an average literacy rate of 89.66%, much higher than the national average of 74.4%: male literacy was 93.13% and female literacy was 85.82%. 8.47% of the population were under 6 years of age. The urban agglomeration of Jammu had a population of 657,314. Most of Jammu and Kashmir's Hindus live in the Jammu region; many speak Dogri.

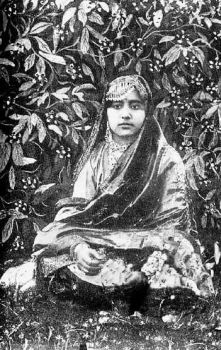
Singer Malika Pukhraj in 1920s

Rank	Language	1961
1	Dogri	55%
2	Punjabi	22%
3	Hindi	11.6%
—	Other	11.4%

=== Muslim communities ===
The city of Jammu had a significant Muslim population prior to the Partition of India, 30 per cent by the 1941 census. During the 1947 Jammu massacres, which preceded and continued during the Pakistan tribal invasion of Kashmir, many Muslims were killed and many driven away to Pakistan.

After the conflict ended, many of the displaced Muslims returned and resettled back in the state. Others settled in Sialkot District and other parts of Pakistani Punjab. Many prominent Punjabi residents in Pakistan, including politician Chaudhry Amir Hussain, economist Mahbub ul Haq, Air Marshal Asghar Khan, journalist Khalid Hasan and singer Malika Pukhraj were from Jammu. In 1961, about 17 per cent of the population in the city was Muslim.

== Education ==
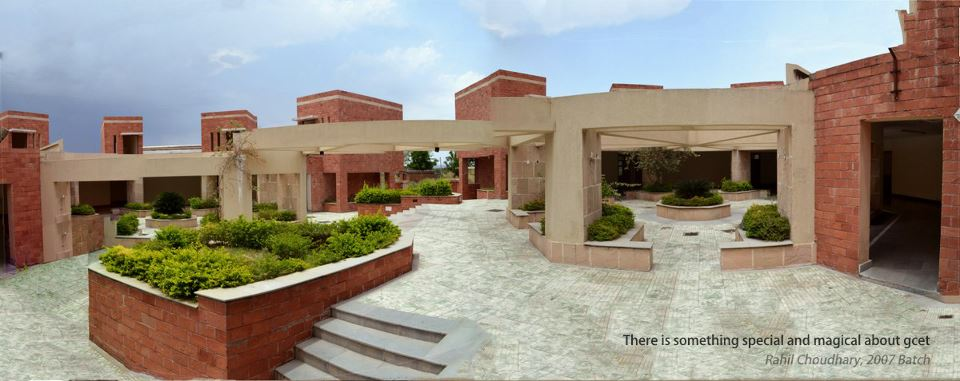
Government College of Engineering and Technology, Jammu

In the 2014–2015 General Budget of India, Arun Jaitley, the Finance Minister of India, proposed an Indian Institute of Technology and an Indian Institute of Management for the division. List of some educational institutions is provided below.

=== Engineering Colleges in Jammu ===
- Indian Institute of Technology Jammu
- Government College of Engineering and Technology, Jammu
- Model Institute of Engineering and Technology, Jammu
- University Institute of Engineering and Technology, University of Jammu

=== Medical Institutions ===
- Indian Institute of Integrative Medicine, CSIR
- Government Medical College, Jammu

=== Legal Institutions ===
- Kishen Chand Law College, Jammu
- Dogra Law College, Jammu
- R. K. Law College, Jammu

=== General Degree Courses (colleges) ===
- Govt. Gandhi Memorial Science College, Jammu
- Govt. MAM PG College, Jammu

=== Universities ===
- Central University of Jammu
- Sher-e-Kashmir University of Agricultural Sciences and Technology of Jammu
- University of Jammu

=== Schools ===
- Kendriya Vidyalaya, Bantalab
- Kendriya Vidyalaya, Sunjuwan

== Cuisine ==
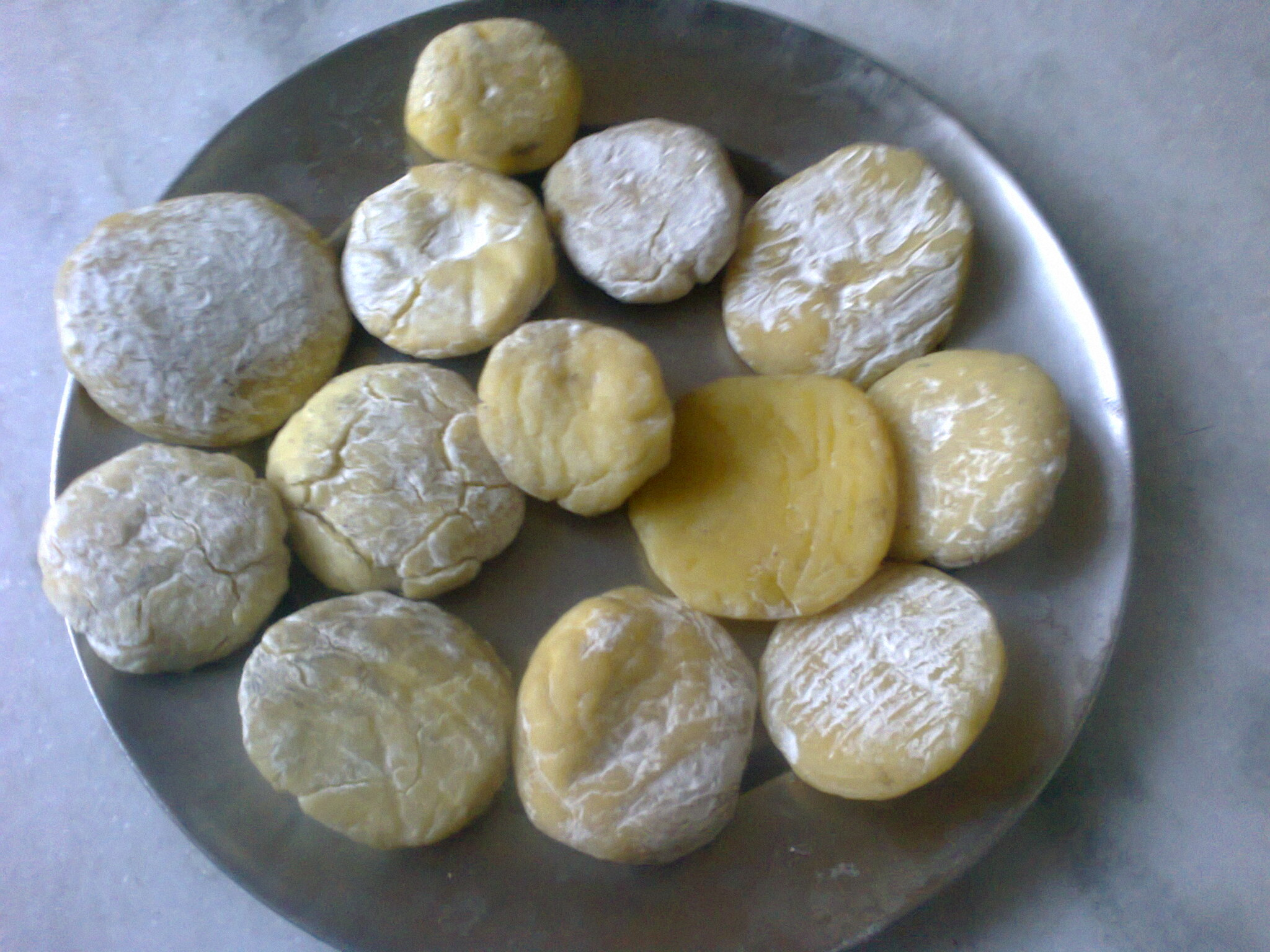
Kalari cheese

Jammu is known for its sund panjeeri, patisa, rajma with rice and Kalari cheese. Dogri food specialties include ambal, khatta meat, kulthein di dal, dal patt, maa da madra, rajma, and auriya. Pickles typical of Jammu are made of kasrod, girgle, mango with saunf, jimikand, tyaoo, seyoo, and potatoes. Auriya is a dish made with potatoes. Jammu cuisine features various chaats, especially gol gappas, kachalu, Chole bhature, gulgule, rajma kulche and dahi palla, among various others.

== Refugees ==
=== Kashmiri Pandit refugees ===
Being comparatively safe from terrorism, Jammu city has become a hub of refugees. These primarily include Kashmiri Hindus who migrated from Kashmir Valley in 1989. Hindus from Pakistan-administered Jammu and Kashmir who migrated to India have also settled in Jammu city. According to records, approximately 31,619 Hindu families had migrated from Pakistan administered Jammu and Kashmir to India. Of these 26,319 families are settled in Jammu.

=== Rohingya refugees ===
Rohingyas who fled Myanmar during 2016 have also currently settled in Jammu. Some believes the settlements of Rohingya Muslims have also raised security threats in Jammu. During the 2018 Sunjuwan attack, intelligence agencies suspected but did not prove involvement of Rohingya Muslims in the attack.

== Notable people ==
- Maulana Abdur Rahman, member of the 2nd Lok Sabha
