= Government College of Engineering and Technology, Jammu =

- Official logo of college
- Motto: Let noble thoughts come to us from all sides
- Type: Govt. Engineering Institution
- Established: 1994; 32 years ago
- Academic affiliations: University of Jammu (Autonomous)
- Principal: Sameru Sharma
- Students: 819
- Location: Chak Bhalwal, Jammu, Jammu and Kashmir, 181122, India; 32.8514°N 74.7793°E
- Campus: 108 acres (44 ha); Rural
- Acronym: GCET
- Website: www.gcetjammu.org.in; coe.gcetj.ac.in

The Government College of Engineering and Technology, Jammu (GCET Jammu) is an engineering institute located in Chak Bhalwal of Jammu district in the Indian union territory of Jammu and Kashmir. Established in 1994, GCET Jammu is the first engineering college of Jammu region and is affiliated with Jammu University for academic progression.

The Government College of Engineering and Technology, Jammu (GCET) was established in the year 1994 under All India Council of Technical Education (AICTE) norms vide Notification No.F-18-1/93-AICTE/910 dated: 30 April 1993 and is affiliated to University of Jammu, Jammu. The inauguration of the college was done by the Governor of Jammu and Kashmir, General K. V. Krishna Rao on 5 October 1994 at Old University Campus, Canal Road, Jammu.

Now, New Campus of GCET has also come up on an area of 869 Kanals of land at Chak Bhalwal, Jammu near Amb Ghrota which is 25 km from Old University Campus, Canal Road, Jammu. The complete College has been shifted to New Campus now.

On Nov 7, 2023 GCET Jammu signed MoU with BIS-Jammu signifying commitment to collaboration in organizing workshops, exposure visits, and industrial visits for students in various industry players within the state. It is now the third technical institution in the Union Territory of Jammu and Kashmir, alongside IIT Jammu and NIT Srinagar, to have signed an MoU with BIS-Jammu.

== Admission process and branch strength ==
The admission of students to GCET Jammu is made through a Common Entrance Test conducted by the BOPEE (Board Of Professional Entrance Examinations). This college has been approved by the AICTE. The college is affiliated to the University of Jammu.

Earlier the strength for the intake of B.E. students was:

- Civil Engineering 30 seats
- Mechanical Engineering 30 seats
- Electrical Engineering 30 seats
- Electronics and Communication Engineering 30 seats
- Computer Engineering 40 seats

However, from the session 2015–16, the number of seats were revised and are as following:

- Civil Engineering 60 + 5% TFW
- Mechanical Engineering 60+ 5% TFW
- Electrical Engineering 60+ 5% TFW
- Electronics and Coummunication Engineering 60+ 5% TFW
- Computer Engineering 60+ 5% TFW
- Total 300+ 5% TFW

As clear from the above table, for each branch, there is a provision of additional 3 seats(5%) for Tuition Fee Waiver Scheme in accordance with AICTE norms.

== Curriculum ==
The Bachelor's degree course consists of eight semesters. Each semester carries 1000 marks and the final percentage of the degree is calculated as the average of all the eight semesters. From first to sixth semester, the curriculum contains six theory courses (600 marks) and four practical courses (400 marks). Much of the first year focuses on the basic sciences, mathematics and introduction to the technical field. The second year is highly interdisciplinary. From fourth semester onwards the course becomes more branch oriented. After fifth semester the students are exposed to summer training in industry for 4–6 weeks.

The seventh and eight semesters i.e. the final year, is different from the rest of the course, with less theory and more practice. Both of these semesters have four theory courses (400 marks). The other 600 marks are divided among the practical courses, summer training, technical seminar, minor project and the major project. 54 seats are approved recently for M.TECH in this institution by AICTE. These will be divided equally among the three branches - mechanical, computers and electronics and communication. Boys hostel has two blocks each having intake capacity 100 students. Girls hostel is under construction.

== New Campus ==
The New Campus of GCET has come up on an area of 869 kanals of land at Chak Bhalwal, Jammu near Amb Ghrota which is nearly 25 km from the Old University Campus, Canal Road, Jammu. The campus is still incomplete with many branches not having their own block. The library block of the campus was completed in November 2016.

== Boys Hostel ==
There is four-storey in-campus boys hostel in GCET Jammu which has a capacity of 200. It consists of two blocks "A" and "B". There are robust sports activities which include HPL (Hostel Premier League) for both cricket and football. There is also a debate club started by alumni; where brain-storming debates of local, national and international issues take place.

== Gallery ==
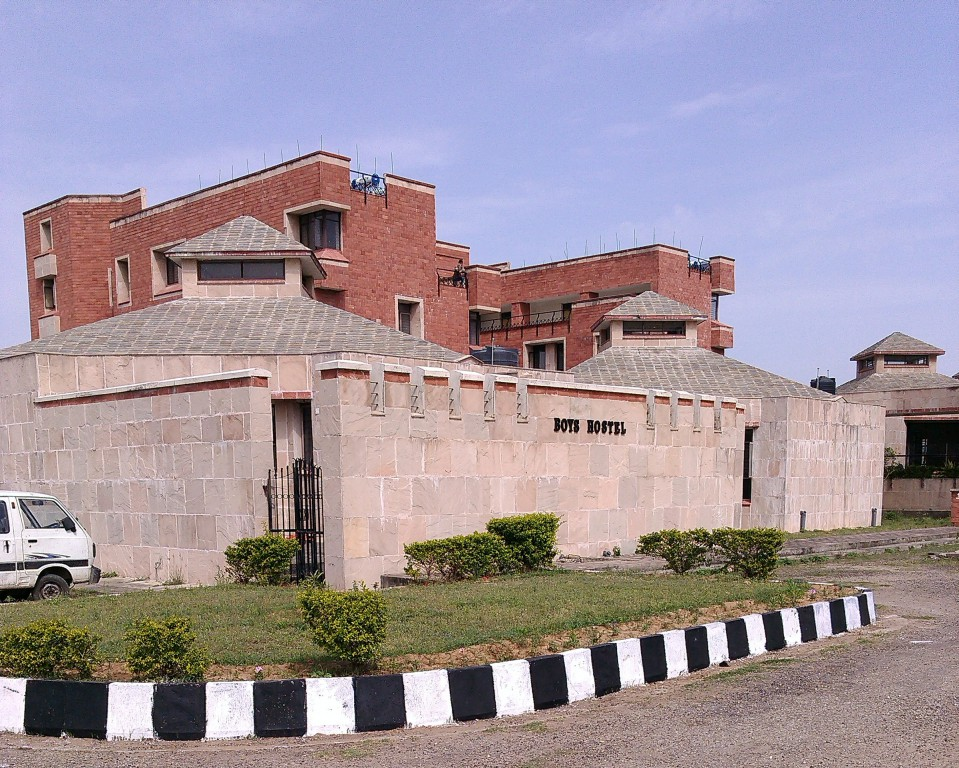
Boys Hostel, GCET Jammu

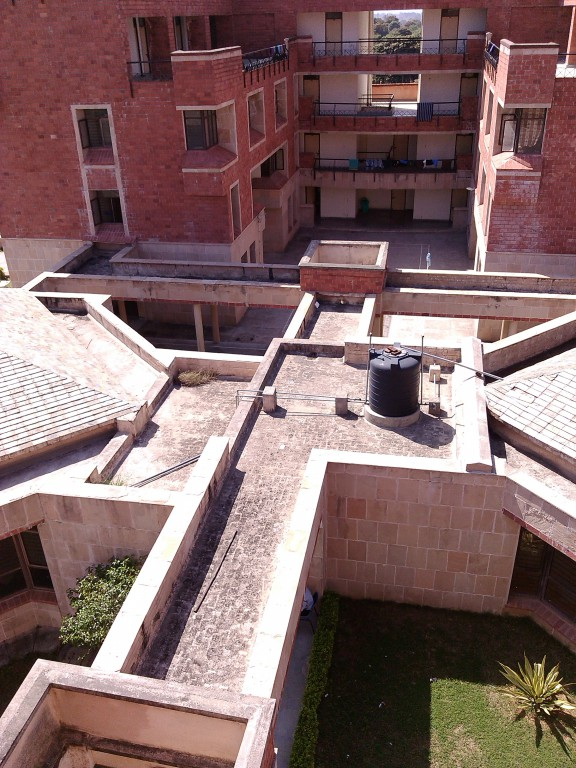
Hostel from top

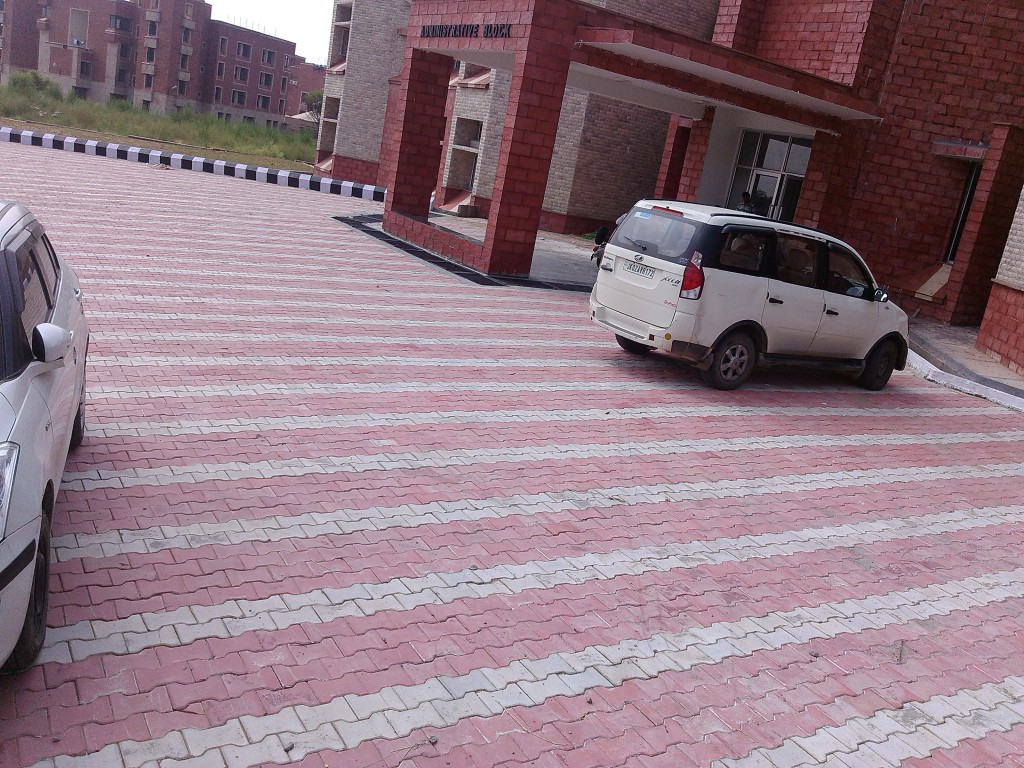
Administrative Block, GCET Jammu

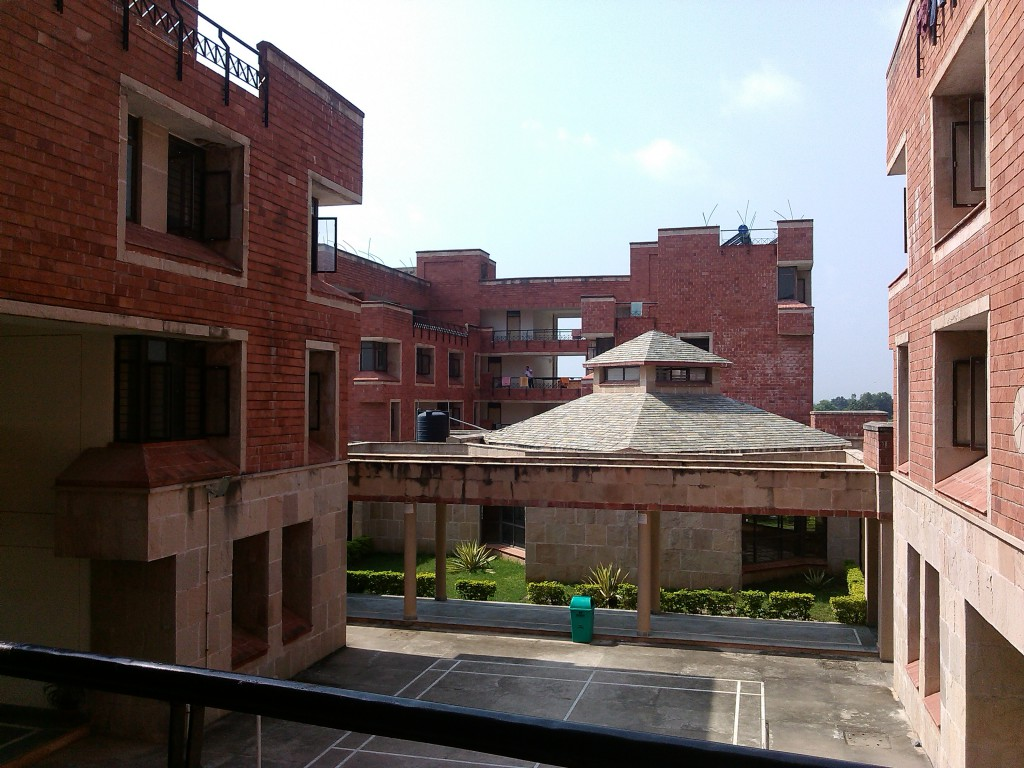
Boys Hostel from Inside

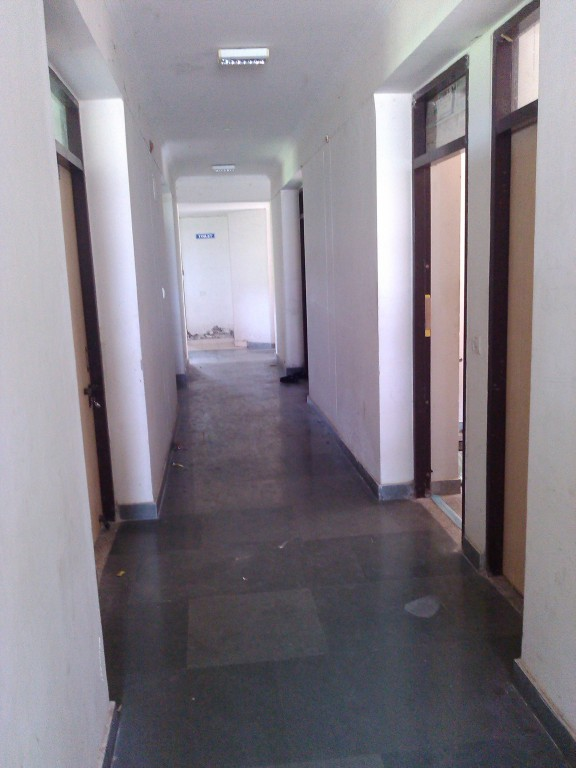
Corridor inside Boys Hostel

== See also ==
- University of Jammu
- National Institute of Technology, Srinagar
