= Kishen Chand Law College =

Law college in Jammu and Kashmir

Kishen Chand Law College or K. C. Law College is a private law school situated beside Akhnoor Road, Rajpura Chungi in Jammu in the Indian union territory of Jammu and Kashmir. It offers undergraduate 3 years law courses, 5 Year Integrated LL.B. courses, approved by Bar Council of India (BCI), New Delhi and affiliated to University of Jammu.

== History ==
Shri Sudershan Mahajan founded the Kishen Chand Educational Society and in 2003, the Society established the law college at Jammu. The college is named after Kishen Chand Mahajan.
