= Bahu Fort =

Fort in Jammu, India

- Part of Forts in India
- Jammu, J&K, India
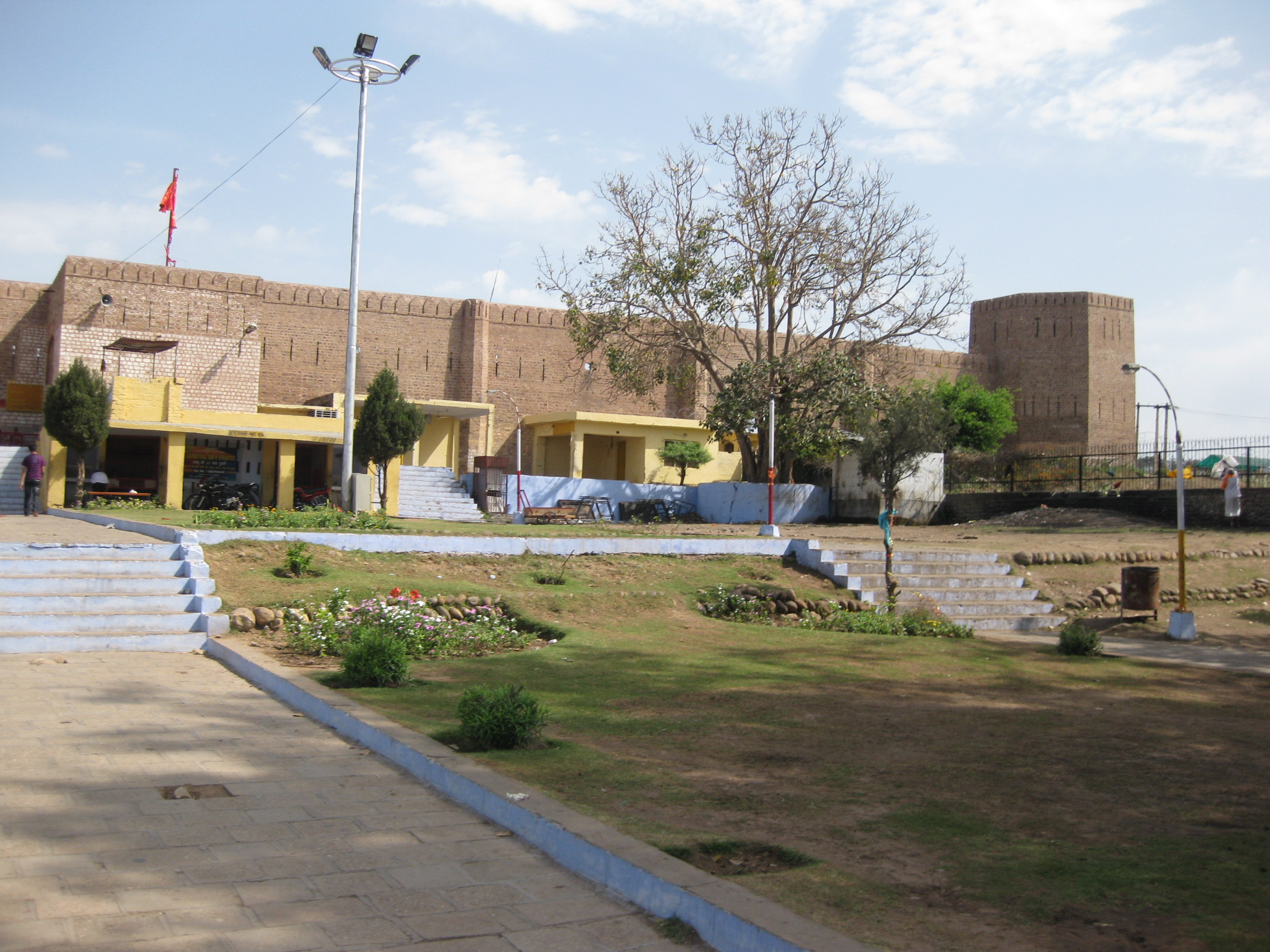
- Bahu Fort

Site information
- Type: Fort & Temple
- Controlled by: J&K Government
- Open to the public: Yes
- Condition: Good

Location
- Fort in Jammu, J&K, India
- Location within Jammu and Kashmir Location within India
- Coordinates: 32.7261°N 74.8803°E

Site history
- Built by: Maharaja of Parmar Rajputs, and repaired by Bahu Lochan.
- Materials: Sandstone Stones

Garrison information
- Occupants: Temple

The Bahu Fort is a historic fort in the city of Jammu, the winter capital of the Indian union territory of Jammu and Kashmir.

Maharaja of Parmar Rajputs constructed the ancient fort on the banks on Tawi River, is believed to have been repaired by Bahu Lochan - brother of the traditional founder of Jammu, Jambu Lochan. It is believed that the first renovation of this fort was undertaken during Dogra Rule in 19th century. The fort is a religious place, and within its precincts has a temple dedicated to the Hindu goddess Kali. The temple is known locally as the "Bawe Wali Mata temple".

== Legend ==
The building of the city of Jammu and the Bahu Fort are linked to a legend. Raja Jambu Lochan, when on a hunting trip, witnessed a curious scene of a tiger and a goat drinking water side by side at the same location in the Tawi River, without the tiger attacking. The Raja considered this a divine direction to establish his new capital here, as the scene he witnessed at this site represented peaceful coexistence. His brother, Bahu Lochan, is credited with building the fort.

== Topography ==
The fort is located on a high plateau land overlooking the Tawi River on its rocky left bank with an average elevation of 325m. The forest area that surrounds the fort has been developed into a well laid out park called the "Bagh-e-Bahu", from where a commanding view of the city of Jammu could be seen. The garden attracts a large number of visitors.

The fort, the temple, and the Bagh-e-Bahu garden are located 5 kilometres (3.1 mi) from the Jammu city centre. The city road to Surinsar was widened for providing approach to an Oil drilling exploration project. However, this project was shelved and consequently the widened new road provided better access to the fort and the temple, and the number of visitors to these places has since increased.

== History ==
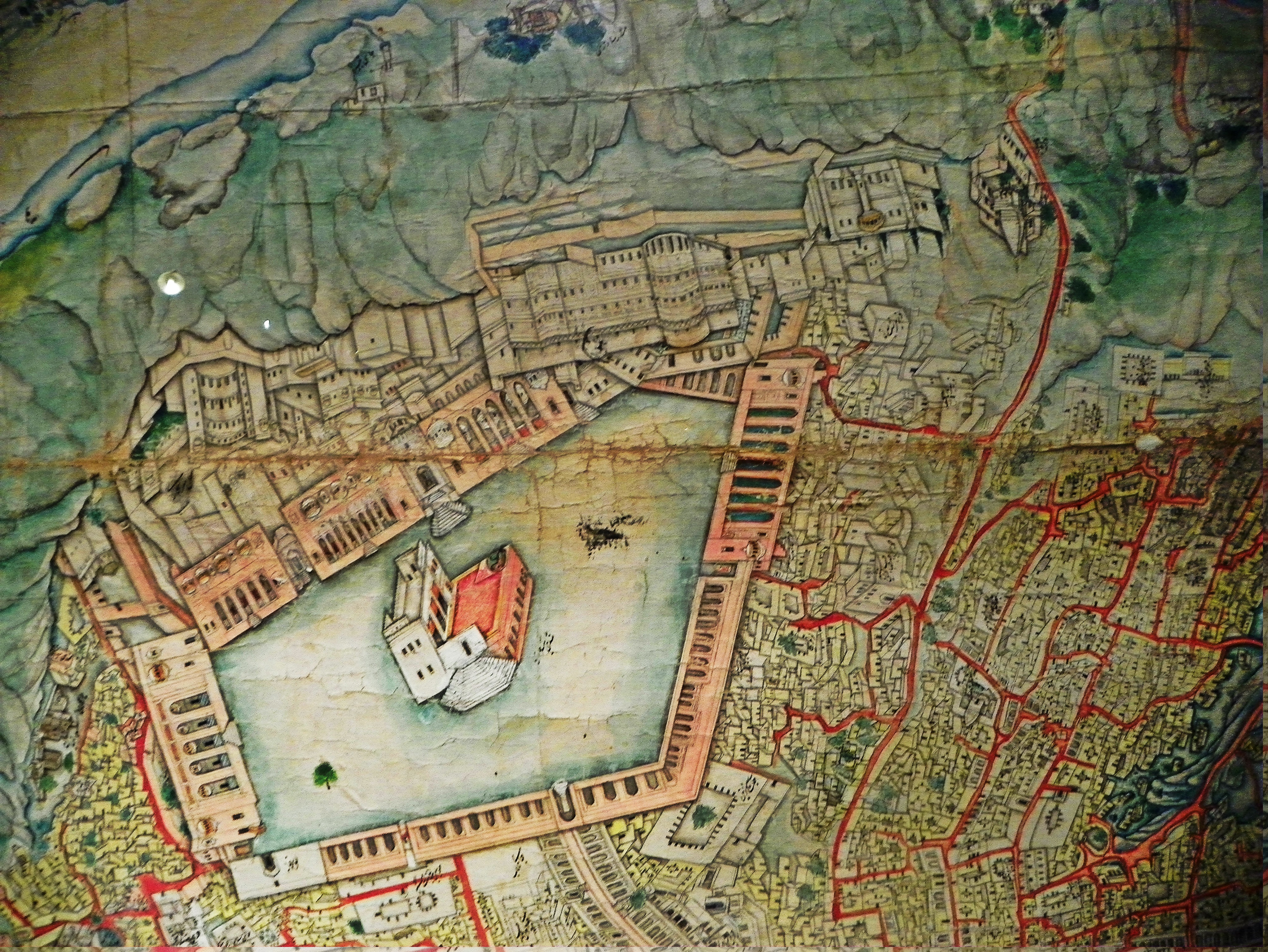
Map of the city of Jammu in 1890

The earliest historical recorded link to the fort is that of Raja Jambu Lochan and his brother Bahu Lochan, sons of a powerful ruler Agnigarbha II of the Jammu dynasty of Suryavanshi kings. Bahu, the eldest of Agnigarbha's 18 sons, is credited with establishing the Jammu city and building the fort. The earlier fort structure was modified over the years to a stronger fortified structure. The present fort was rebuilt, probably at the same location as the ancient fort, by Autar Dev, the grandson of Kapoor Dev in 1585. Over the years the fort underwent demolitions and reconstructions from time to time, until during Sikh Empire the then new Governor/Raja of Jammu Maharaja Gulab Singh reconstructed the present fort in the 19th century, which was further refurbished during the rule of Maharaja Ranbir Singh. They first established temples for their tutelary deities; the image of Mahakali deity in the temple in the fort was brought from Ayodhya.

== Bahu fort ==
The fort structure is located at an elevation of 325 metres (1,066 ft), opposite to the old town of Jammu. The fortified structure has thick walls made of sandstones built with lime and brick mortar. It has eight octagonal towers or turrets connected by thick walls. The towers have enclosures to house guards. The main entry is fit to allow passage of elephants into the fort. A water tank with access for pilgrims to take bath is located on the left entry into the fort. This tank or pond is 6.1× in size and has a water depth of 4.6 metres (15 ft). A pyramidal structure is on the right flank (with very thick walls to withstand any gun attack) of the fort was an ammunition store. An underground chamber here was used a prison. This chamber has a secret exit to escape from the fort in case of any emergencies. The first floor is lavishly built with arches and decorated with floral designs like a Baradari or a palace.

To the right of the temple, there are a few halls which were used in the past as assembly halls and offices of the Quiledar (master of the fort). However, they are not maintained at all. The royal stables were also located within this fort. Substantial renovation and additions to attract visitors have been added during recent years.

Mahakali temple

It is a renowned Shakti temple built within the fort during the 8th century. It has been built in white marble on a raised platform of 1.2 metres (3.9 ft) height. While it is claimed that it was built during 8th or 9th century, the temple as built looks modern. It is a small temple which can accommodate only a few worshippers at a time at the Mandapa, outside the sanctum sanctorum. In the past, animal sacrifice was practiced at this temple, which has since been discontinued. Today, a priest performs a few rites uttering some religious incantations and sprinkles holy water over the animal (usually a sheep or goat) and then lets it go free. Other food offering made by devotees is a sweet dish called Kadah (pudding), after their wishes placed before the deity are fulfilled.

Another special feature seen in the temple precincts is the presence of a large group of Rhesus monkeys, the largest such group in Jammu and Kashmir State. The monkeys are fed by devotees with sweets, gram etc.

== Development works ==
The fort, which is a heritage site declared by the state government, is proposed to be linked with a rope way running from the Mubarak Mandi Palace, another heritage site in the city. The immediate surroundings have been converted into park with fountains and a small lake for boating. Considering the heritage status of the fort, further conservation works have been planned at a cost of Rs 6.97 million.

== Festivals ==
A popular Hindu festival is known as "Bahu Mela" is held during the Navaratras in the fort area, twice a year, during March–April and September–October. This attracts a very large number of pilgrims to the fort and the temple located within it. Every week, Tuesday and Sunday are special days of worship at the temple. During the main festival time, special stalls are opened near the fort area selling paraphernalia such as sweets, flowers, incense, coconuts, red cloth and so forth, to make special offerings to the deity in the temple.

== Demolition due to heavy rains ==
On 18 August 2013, a portion of the fort wall collapsed due to many days of heavy rains. No casualties were reported.

== Gallery ==
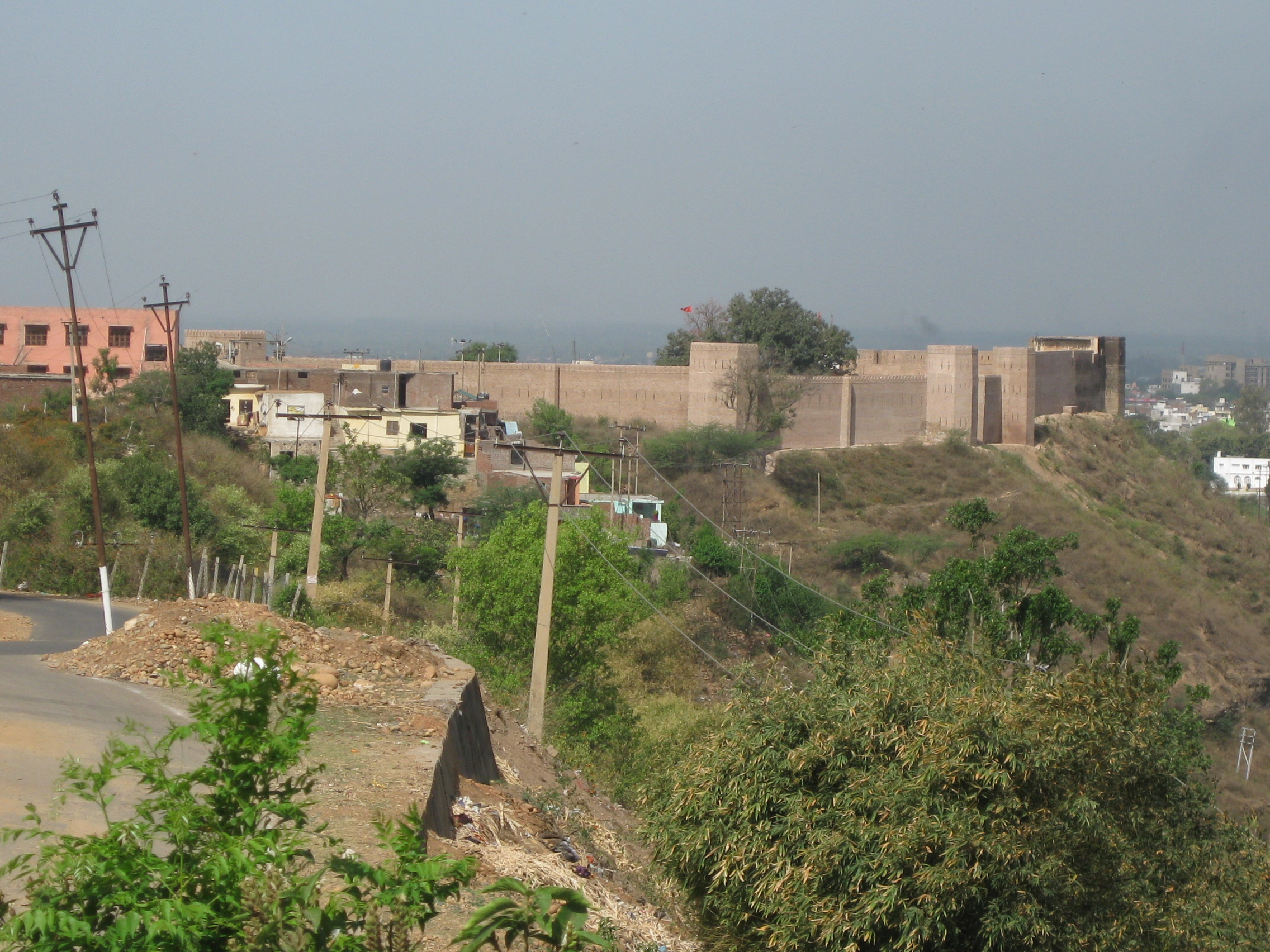
A complete view of the fort from the Sansar road

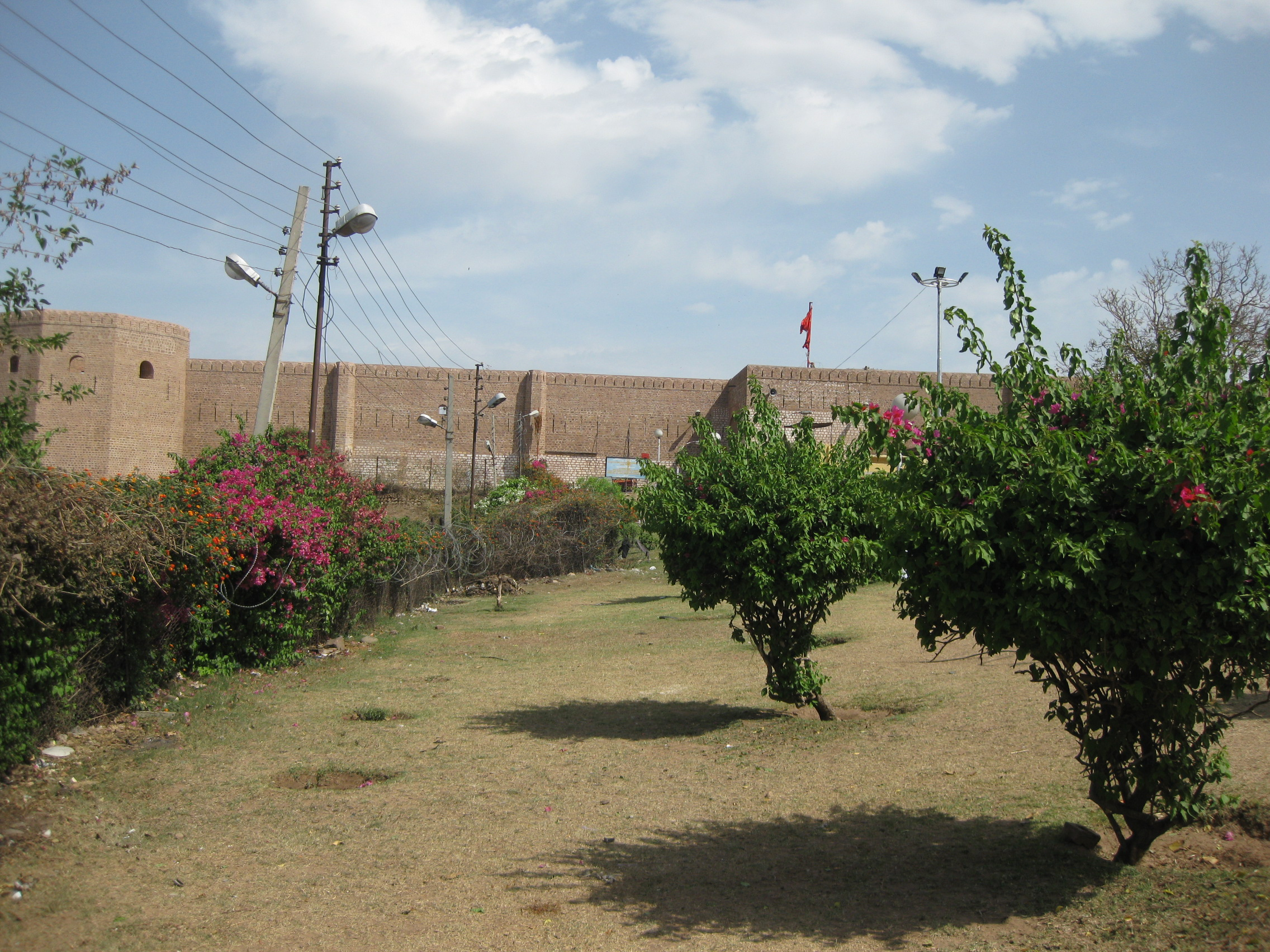
Another view of the fort

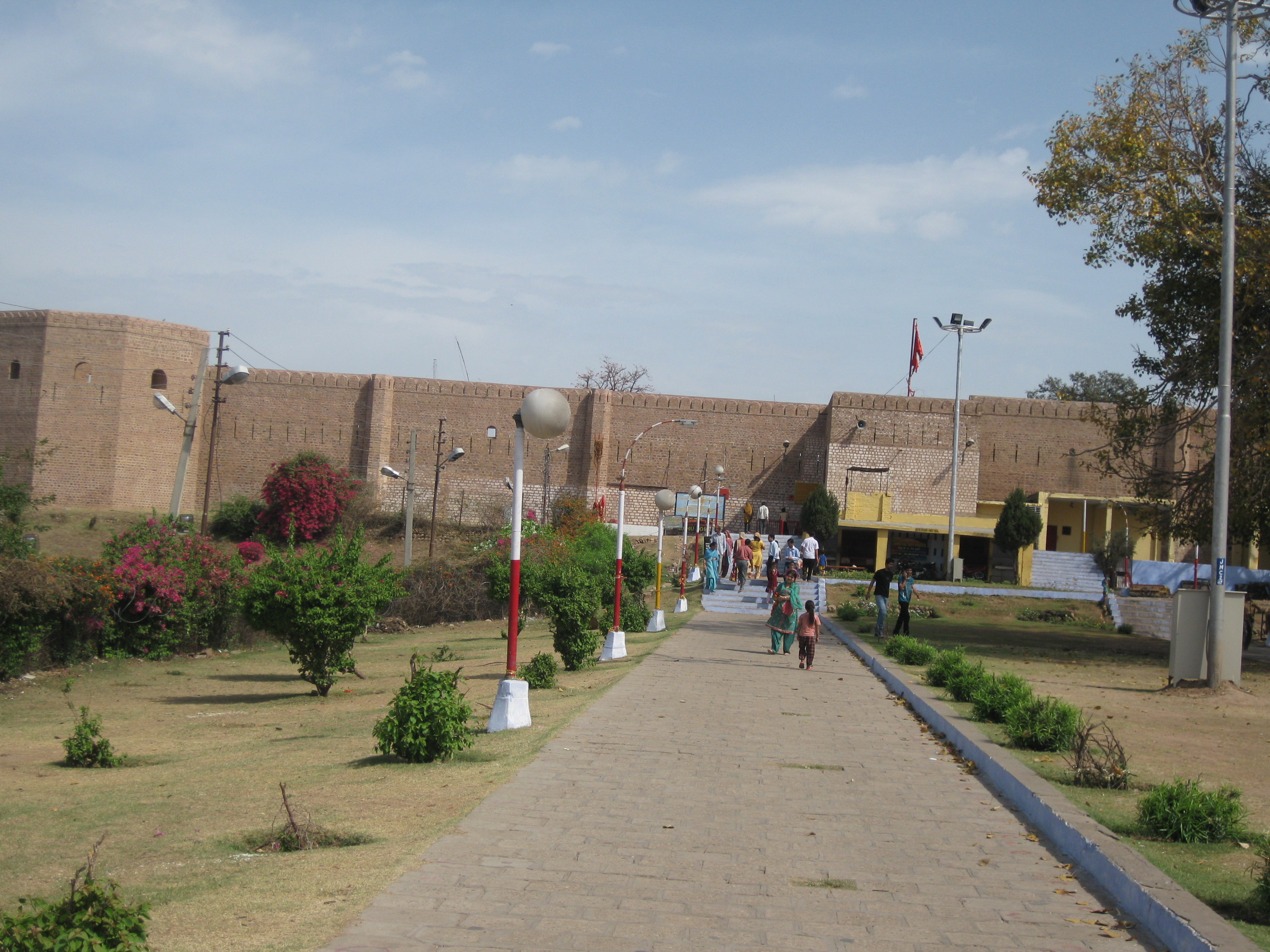
View of right flank of the fort

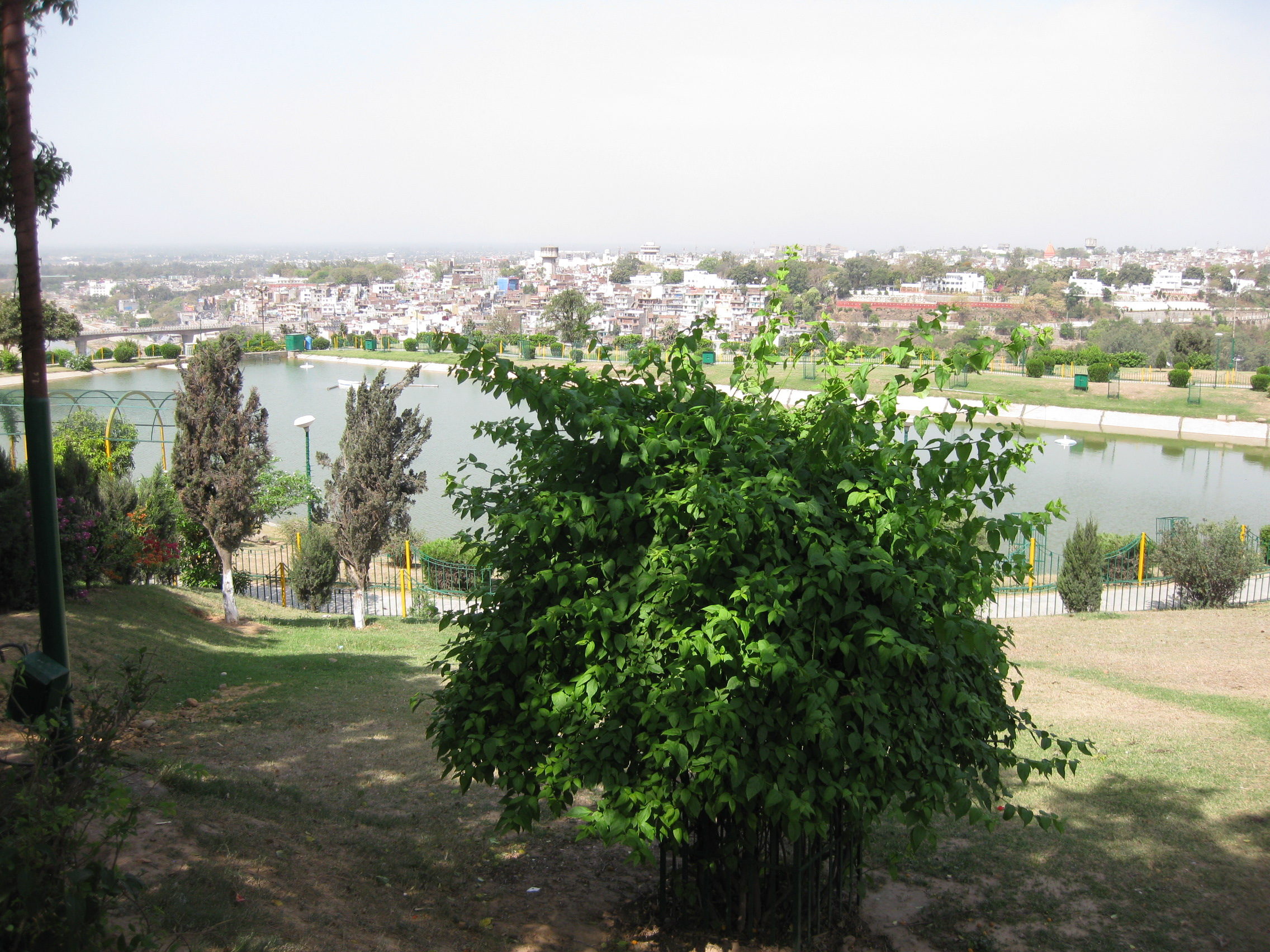
View of the garden and the lake around the fort
