= Battle of Jammu (1712) =

1712 battle of the Mughal-Sikh Wars fought in Jammu

- Part of Mughal–Sikh Wars
Date	22 January 1712
Location	Jammu
Result	Mughal victory

Belligerents
First Sikh State	Mughal Empire: Hindu rulers of Deva dynasty of Jammu

Commanders and leaders
Banda Singh Bahadur	Rustamdil Khan; Muhammad Amin; Aghar Khan; Raja Dhruv Dev

Casualties and losses
500	Unknown

The Battle of Jammu was fought between the Sikhs under the command of Banda Singh Bahadur against the Mughal forces near the hills of Jammu on 22 January 1712. The Mughals were able to achieve a victory against the Sikhs. Raja Dhruv Dev of Jammu supported the Mughals.

== Background ==
After the killing of the Mughal commanders Shamas Khan and Bayazid Khan near Bahranpur, the Sikhs under Banda Singh Bahadur began occupying the cities of Pasrur and Aurangabad. The Mughal forces under the leadership of Rustamdil Khan, the commander-in-chief of the Sikh campaigns in Jammu, with the assistance of Muhammad Amin Khan Turani were able to defeat the Sikhs near Pasrur. They pursued the Sikhs to the hills of Jammu.

== Battle ==
Muhammad Amin Khan soon joined both Rustamdil Khan and Aghar Khan and combined their forces in an attempt to encircle the Sikhs. However, the Sikhs were able to cut through the Mughal lines and escape. Rustamdil Khan then proceeded to commit atrocities on the villages of Parol and Kathua and sold its men and women in the slave markets of Lahore, because he suspected that the villagers were Sikhs. Muhammad Amin advanced upon Jammu and was able to kill 500 Sikhs. Banda Singh however was able to escape.

== Aftermath ==
Banda Singh was able to escape from the hills of Jammu and was successful in retaking both Sadhaura and Lohgarh. After the death of Bahadur Shah I, a civil war would ensue between Bahadur Shah's successors in March 1712. Jahandar Shah would succeed Bahadur Shah as the new Mughal emperor and send Muhammad Amin Khan to retake Sahdaura from the Sikhs. Muhammad Amin Khan however failed in retaking Sadhaura and was soon recalled by Jahandar Shah to join him on his expedition in Agra against Jahandar Shah's nephew, Farrukhsiyar. After achieving victory in the Mughal civil war, Farrukhsiyar was crowned as the new Mughal emperor and he led a new campaign against the Sikhs which eventually led to the capture and execution of Banda Singh Bahadur in 1716.

== See also ==
- Battle of Lohgarh
