= Kalari cheese =

Indian traditional ripened cheese

Kalari (kalaadi)
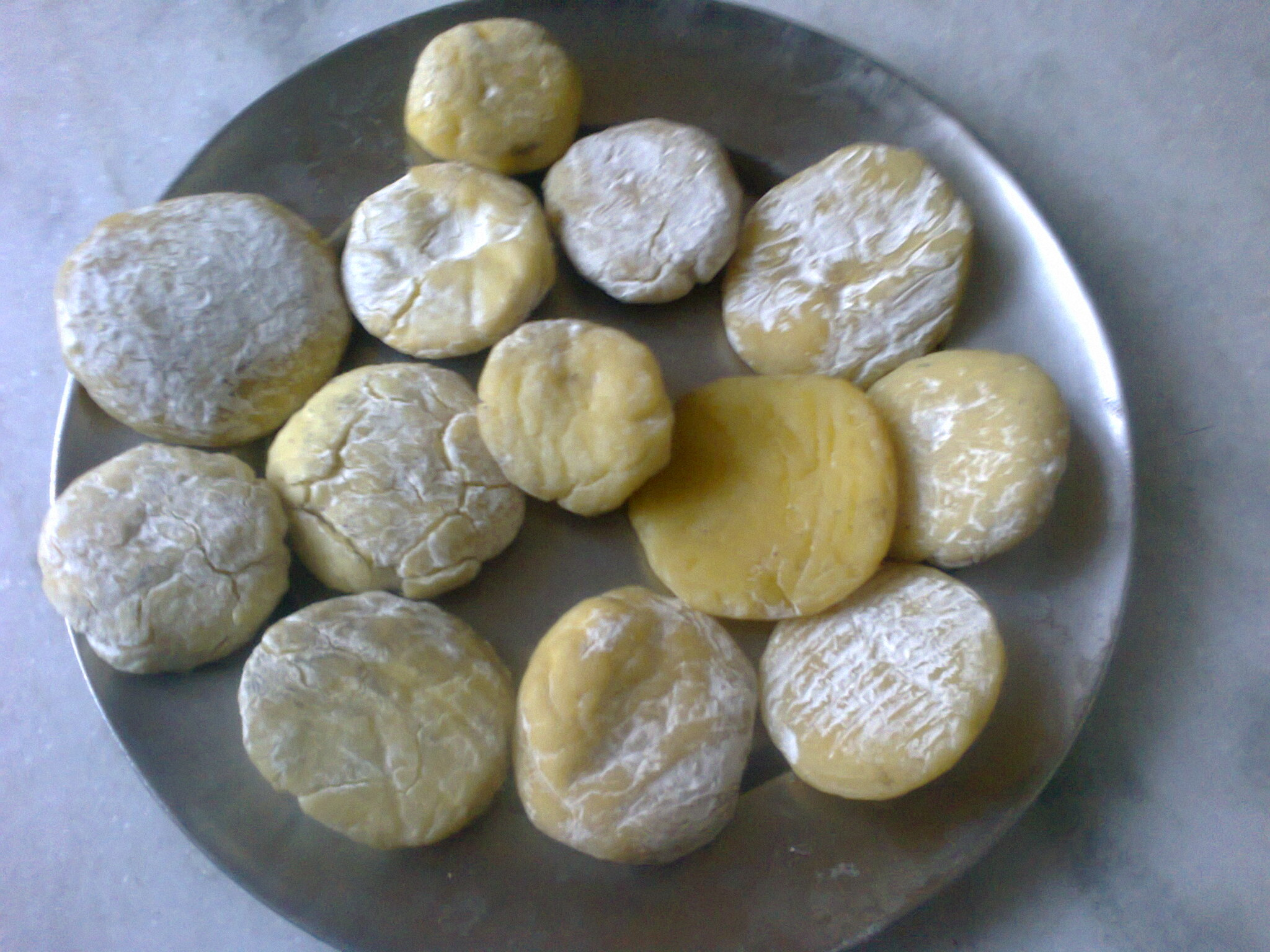
- Kalari cheese
- Country of origin: India
- Region: Jammu and Kashmir
- Source of milk: Cow's milk, sometimes goats' milk
- Texture: Semi-soft

Kalari or kaladi is a traditional Indian cheese believed to have been developed by the Dogra people of Jammu region. It was created to preserve milk in a solid form during the hot summer months, especially when fresh milk was difficult to store. Over time, kalari became an integral part of Dogra cuisine, valued for its rich flavor and nutritional benefits. The authentic recipe continues to be prepared in the Dogra region, while today it is also widely sold across the northern parts of India.

It is indigenous to Ramnagar in the Udhampur district of the Jammu division, within the union territory of Jammu and Kashmir, India and a common snack among ethnic Dogras. It is a very dense cheese that is usually sautéd in its own fat and salted while serving. Kalari is usually made from cow's or buffalo's milk, though kalari made from goat's milk is also available, and has a whitish color. Traditionally kalaris are made from raw (uncooked) full fat milk that is separated using soured milk. The solidified part is packed in donas (small bowls made of leaves) and sun-dried. The excess liquid drips down from the semi-porous donas and the rest of the moisture is evaporated by sun-drying. As the ambient temperature is low and the sun is strong in the Shivalilk mountains, the kalari becomes dry from outside yet retains moisture from inside. Sometimes fungus grows on this and gives it a unique flavor.

== Background ==
Kalari, traditionally a Ramnagar, Udhampur cheese, is an authentic Dogra cheese and often made part of various cheese-based cuisines, such as the "Kaladi Kulcha," which is a popular snack indigenous to Jammu region. Kalari Kulcha is famous street food of and can be seen in the menu list of road side vendors and big shops. To prepare a Kalari, it is dabbed in salt and sautéd in its own fat, it is covered while sautéing. Preparing Kalari requires some expertise that may be mastered in couple of trials. Some people use butter or ghee for making it more viscous and for making it properly crispy. After some time the Kalari is flipped over and covered again. After sautéing, it gets brownish crispy layer outside and soft, creamy, gooey melted cheese inside (akin to melted mozzarella cheese). That is the precise reason Kalari is often termed as "Mozzarella of Jammu" or "Mozarella of Dogras".

Kalari is often served hot and salted with tomatoes, onions, bread and cabbage. In recent improvisation it is made like a burger with Kalari as the patty in layers of coleslaw like salad, tomatoes, etc. filled up in a bun. Kalari is also served with a Kulcha with first kaladi being seasoned with red powdered chilli and then squished between kulcha while being shallow fried. The complete ensemble is shallow fried. Earlier Kalari was served on its own without any breads. Later Kalari sandwich came into existence that consisted of Kalari placed in two slices of bakery bread with complete sandwich shallow fried in the pan containing left over fat from frying the kalari. Some tamarind chutney with red chilli powder and salt are also added. Sometimes it is also prepared by first wetting it and covering it in a dry mixture of whole wheat flour (atta), red chilli powder and salt then sautéing over a nonstick pan. In Jammu people also make a curry with it called कलाड़ी दा सलूना/न्योड़ा or 𑠊𑠥𑠬𑠫𑠮 𑠛𑠬 𑠩𑠥𑠰𑠝𑠬/𑠝𑠹𑠣𑠵𑠫𑠬 in local Dogri language. Pakodas are also prepared with kalari. It is a popular delicacy of Duggar people, and is served particularly at weddings and other events.

== See also ==
- Paneer
- Chhena
- Indian cuisine
- Kashmiri cuisine
- List of cheeses
