= Makhan Lal Fotedar =

Indian politician (1932–2017)

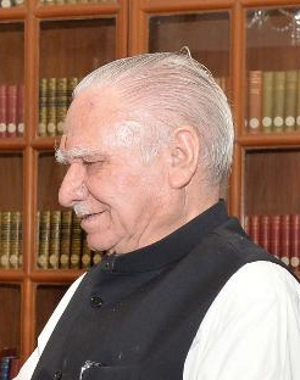

Minister of Health and Family Welfare
- In office 21 June 1991 – 17 January 1993
- Prime Minister: P. V. Narasimha Rao
- Preceded by: Chandra Shekhar
- Succeeded by: B. Shankaranand

Minister of Steel and Mines
- In office 25 July 1987 – 2 December 1989
- Prime Minister: Rajiv Gandhi
- Preceded by: Vasant Sathe
- Succeeded by: Dinesh Goswami

Personal details
- Born: March 5, 1932 Mattan, Jammu & Kashmir, India
- Died: September 28, 2017 (aged 85) Gurgaon, Haryana
- Party: Indian National Congress
- Other political affiliations: All India Indira Congress (Tiwari) (1996–1998)

Makhan Lal Fotedar (5 March 1932 – 28 September 2017) was an Indian politician who served as a senior leader of the Congress political party. He was a close aide of the Nehru family, especially Indira Gandhi. He had also been a cabinet minister in the Government of India and had held important cabinet posts.

== Early life ==
Fotedar was born in the village of Mattan in the Anantnag district of the Kashmir Valley, in the princely state of Jammu and Kashmir, within British India. He was also a leader of the Kashmiri Pandits.

== Political career ==
From 1967 to 1977, he was member of Jammu and Kashmir Legislative Assembly from the Pahalgam constituency and was also cabinet minister in the government of Jammu and Kashmir under Syed Mir Qasim. He had been an MP from Rajya Sabha from 1985 to 1996. He was known as the Chanakya of Indian politics in the eyes of Congress party.

He resigned from the Indian National Congress after the 1992 demolition of the Babri Masjid and also resigned from P V Narasimha Rao's cabinet. Then along with N. D. Tiwari and Arjun Singh, he split from All India Indira Congress (Tiwari) but returned to Indian National Congress after Sonia Gandhi took over as congress President.

== Death ==
He died on 28 September 2017, at a hospital in Gurgaon on the outskirts of Delhi. He was living in Gurgaon, Haryana with his family, and was survived by three sons and two daughters.
