= Parihaspore =

Archaeological site in Jammu and Kashmir, India

- archaeological site
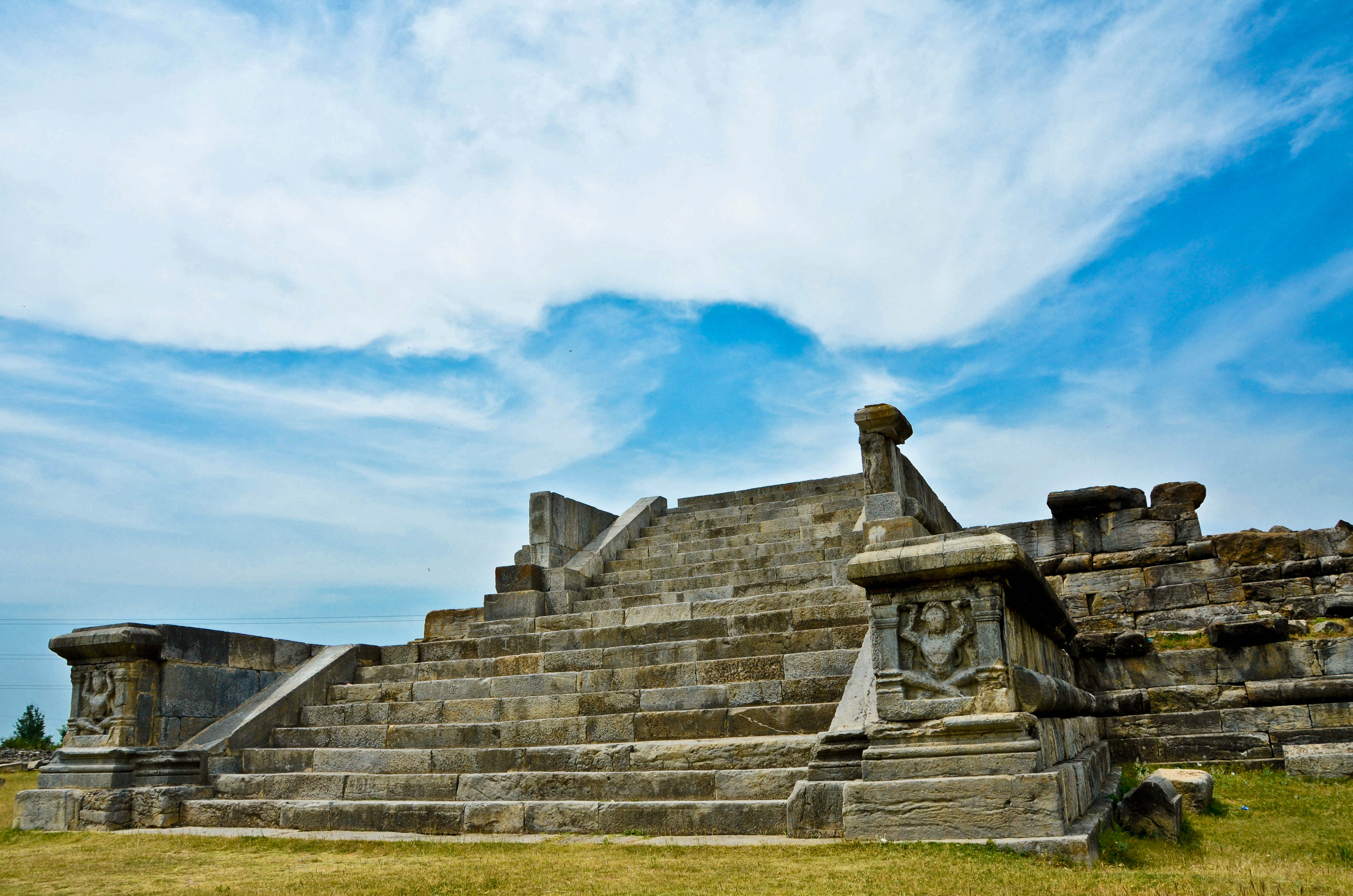
- Parihaspur Stupa

- Location in Jammu and Kashmir, India Parihaspore (India)
- Coordinates: 34°08′N 74°38′E
- Country: India
- Union territory: Jammu and Kashmir
- District: Baramulla
- Tehsil: Pattan
- Established: ~700 CE
- Founder: Lalitaditya Muktapida
- Named for: City of Laughter
- Time zone: UTC+5:30 (IST)

Parihaspora or Parihaspur or Paraspore or Paraspur was a small town 22 kilometres (14 mi) northwest of Srinagar in the Kashmir Valley. It was built on a plateau above the Jhelum River. It was built by Lalitaditya Muktapida (695–731 CE) and served as the capital of Kashmir during his reign.

== Etymology ==
The present name of the place, Paraspore, is derived from the original Sanskrit name of the city, Parihaspur, which loosely translated would mean a city of laughs or a smiling city. "Parihas" means laughter and "pur" means city.

== History ==
It was built by Lalitaditya Muktapida (695–731 CE) of the Karkota dynasty. He moved his capital from Srinagar to Parihaspur. Kalhana mentions the construction of the city in his Book 4 cantos 194–204. Lalitaditya according to Kalhana built his residence and four temples in this area. The temples included one for Vishnu (Muktakeshva) where according to Kalhana the emperor used 84,000 tolas of gold to make the image of Vishnu. In another temple he used as many Palas of silver for the image of Parihaskesana. He also had made a statue of Buddha in copper that according to Kalhana "reached up to the sky." The main temple was larger than the famous temple that Lalitaditya built in Martand.

Parihaspur lost its status as a capital after Lalitaditya's death. His son moved the royal residence. The Jhelum River is to the northeast of Parihaspur as it meets the Sind Nallah at Shadpur sangam. In the past this confluence of the rivers occurred closer to Parihaspur. The change in the course of the river is not natural but was engineered by famous Soya Pandit during Raja Avanti Varman's time (855–883 CE). With the river access gone, the city suffered greatly.

The real destruction occurred when Avanti Varman's son Shankar Varman moved his capital to the new city of Shankarpur. According to Kalhana he cannibalised all the "good material" from these temples and palaces to build his city of Shankarpur (Pattan). Parihaspur however survived the pillage because Kalhana mentions that during the war between King Harsha and Uccala (1089–1101 CE), Uccala took refuge in Parihaspur. King Harsha believing that Uccala was in one of the buildings set the place on fire. He broke and melted down the statues of Parihaspur. The final blow to the temples came when Sultan Sikandar destroyed them completely in the fourteenth century.

== Present ruins ==
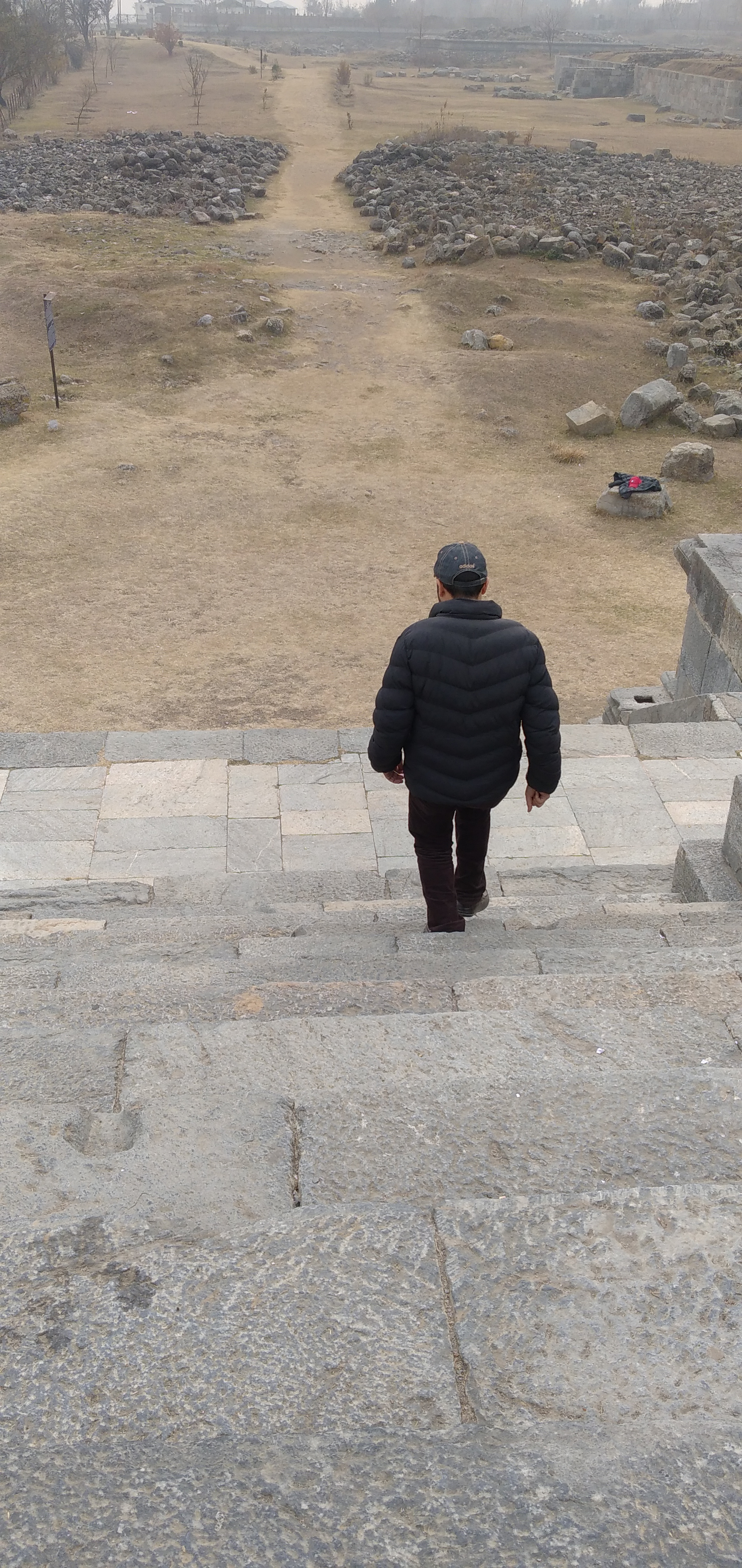
Latest picture of Parihaspora ruins

Only ruins in the form of large boulders, some ornately carved, and in situ carved footings are left of the old city now, and the place is commonly known as "Kani Shahar" (City of Stones) to local residents. Some of the finest examples of the carved figures of seated and standing atlantes have been taken to the Srinagar Museum. M.A.Stein first visited the place in 1892 and was able to place each of these constructions based on ruins that he found at that time. Stein also thinks that the village Gurdan near Parihaspur comes from Govardhana. Govardhana dhara is one of the names of Vishnu. He visited the place again in 1892 and found that many stones that he had seen in 1892 were gone. Apparently Maharaja of Kashmir was building the Jhelum cart road and using the Parihaspur ruins as road material. Stein approached the British resident at that time for help. He was able to convince the Dogra king to stop further desecration of the historic temple ruins.

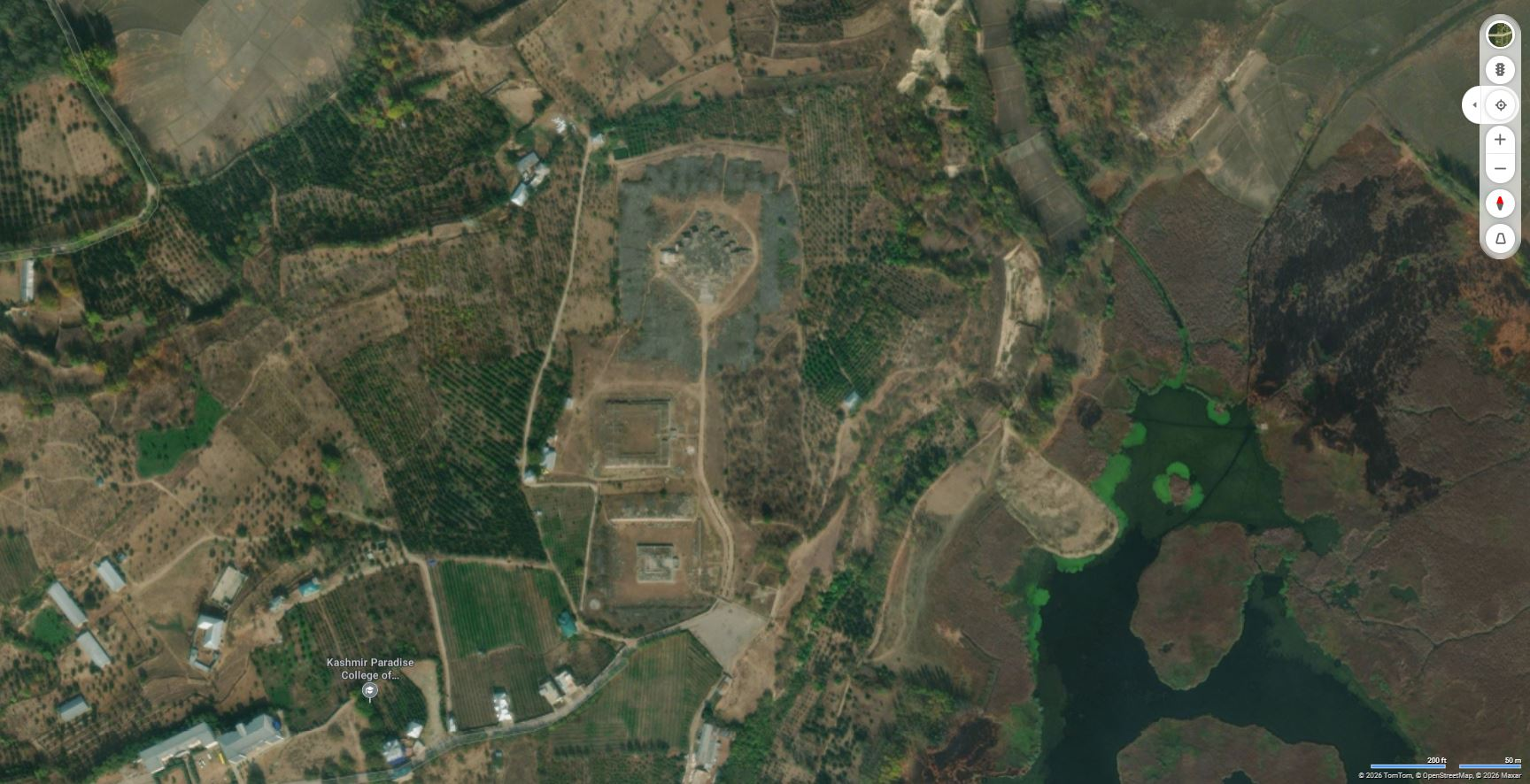
Parihaspora Pattan Satellite Image 2026

== Notable people ==
- Kalhana
