= Wangath temple complex =

Wangath Temple complex
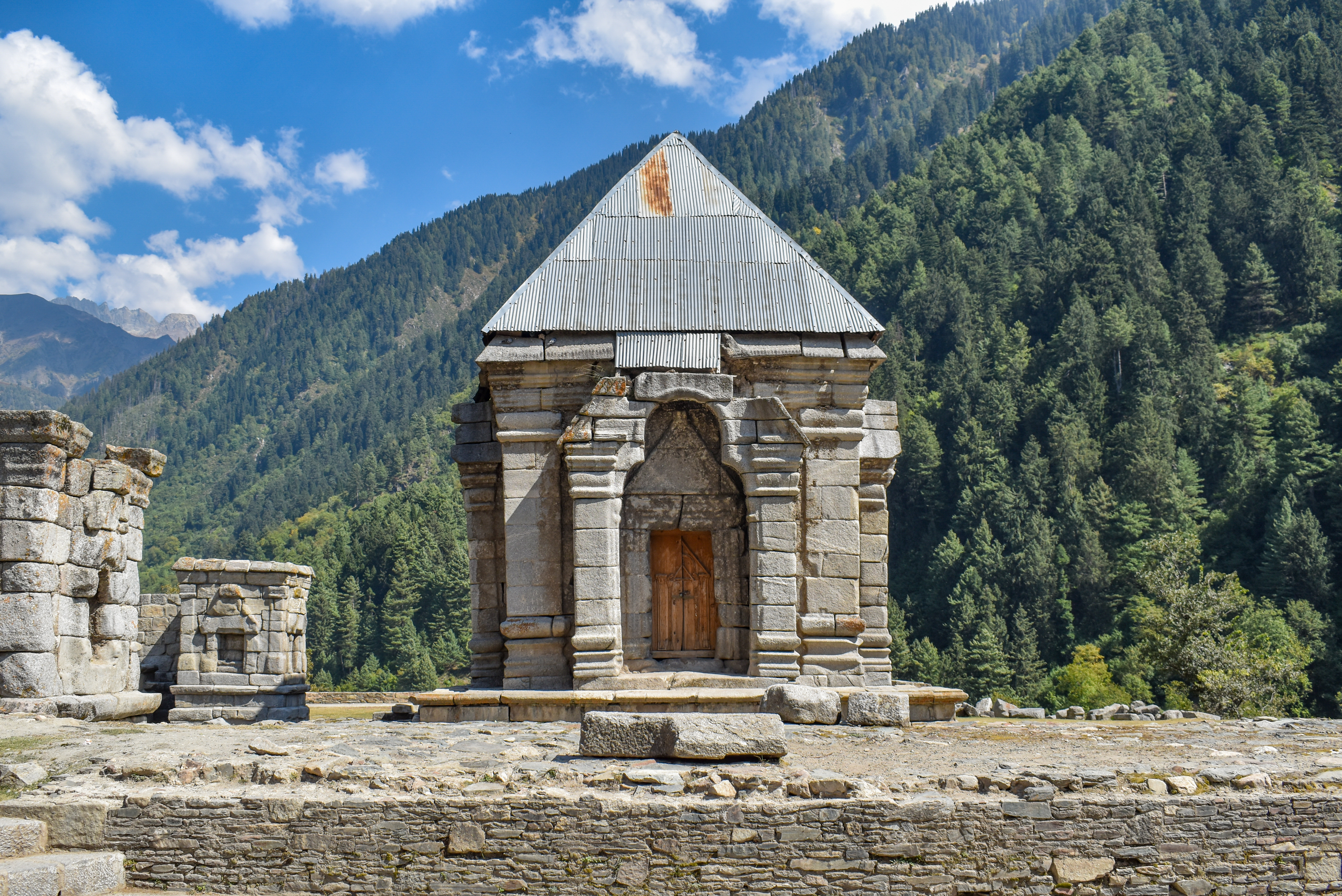
- Main Shiva Temple, Western Complex, Naranag

- Location in Jammu and Kashmir, India Wangath temple complex (India)

Religion
- Affiliation: Hinduism
- District: Ganderbal
- Deity: Shiva

Location
- Location: Naranag
- State: Jammu & Kashmir
- Country: India
- Interactive map of Wangath Temple complex
- Coordinates: 34°21′10″N 74°58′34″E

Architecture
- Creator: Jaluka Maurya, Son of Ashoka and later Lalitaditya Muktapida
- Completed: 8th century CE

Specifications
- Temple: 17 (seventeen)
- Elevation: 2,248 m (7,375 ft)

Wangath Temple complex is a group of Hindu temple monuments in Wangath, near Naranag, in the Ganderbal district of Jammu and Kashmir, India. Wangath is a village around 48 miles (77 km) northeast of Srinagar, in the Himalayas to the northeast of the Kashmir Valley. It was built by Lalitaditya Muktapida of the Karkota dynasty in the 8th century CE, and is now in ruins.

== History ==
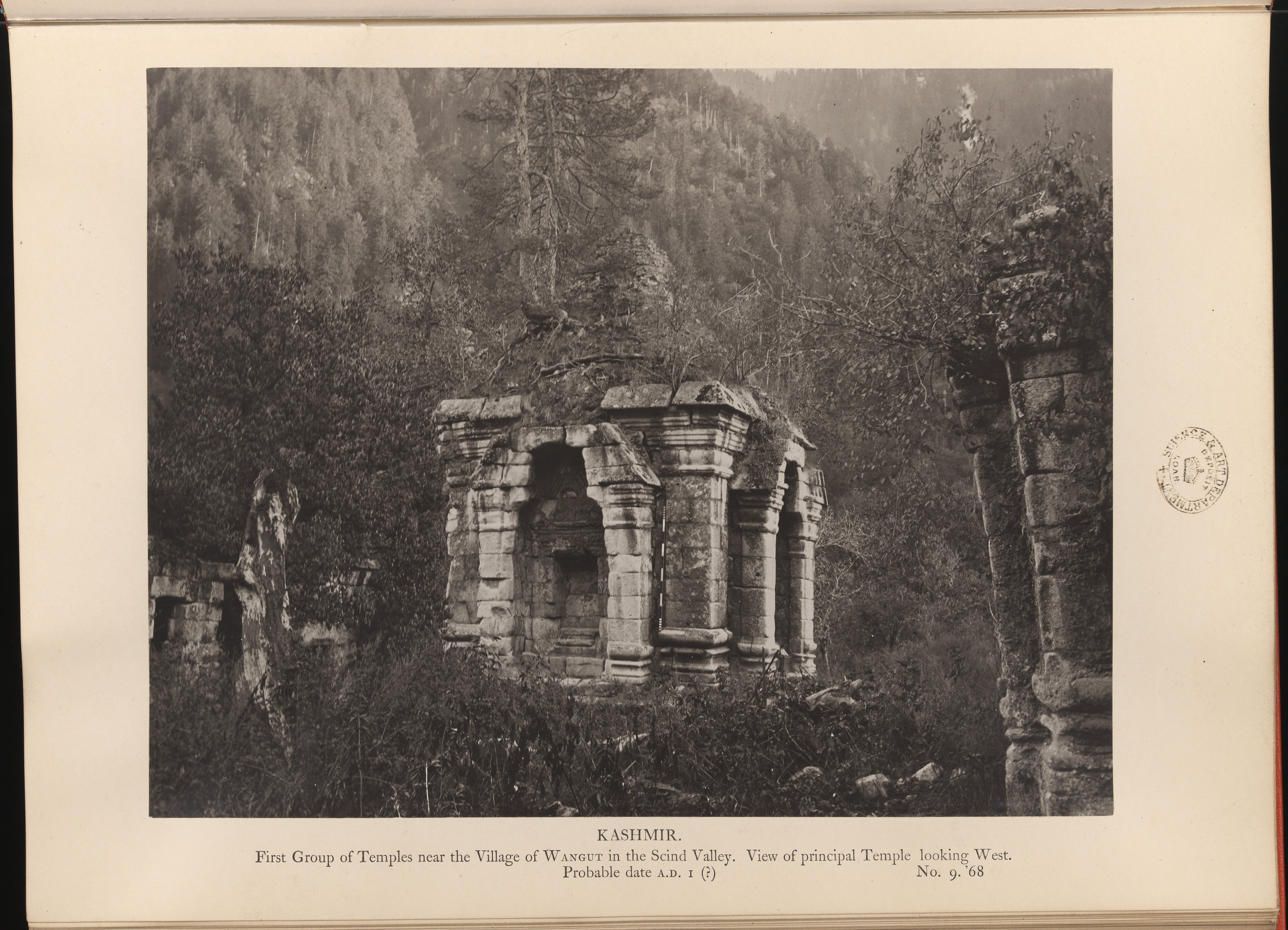
First group of temples near the village of Wangut in the Scind Valley

Kalhana notes in Rajatarangini that Ashoka built the city of Srinagar in the 3rd century BCE. His son Jaluka, 220 BCE, built the Shaivite temples Bhuteshvara, Jyestarudra, and Muthas in the Wangath valley around the holy spring of Naranag. The Wangath temples were built in three groups, around the same time as the Shankaracharya Temple in Srinagari and the Bumazuv temple near Mattan. King Jaluka built a stone temple at the site of the spring Naranag around 137 BCE. King Jayendra (61 BCE) used to worship Shiva Bhutesha at the shrine. Lalitaditya Muktapida (713–735 CE) donated a large sum of money to the shrine after his victorious expedition. King Avantivarman (855–883 CE) built a stone pedestal with a silver conduit at this shrine for the bathing of sacred images. Kalhana's father Canpaka and uncle Kanka also frequented the site.

As per Kalhana, the treasury of this shrine was plundered by King Sangramraja of Kashmir (1003–28 CE), during King Uccala's time (1101–1111 CE) and later by the rebel baron Hayavadana.

== Architecture and style ==
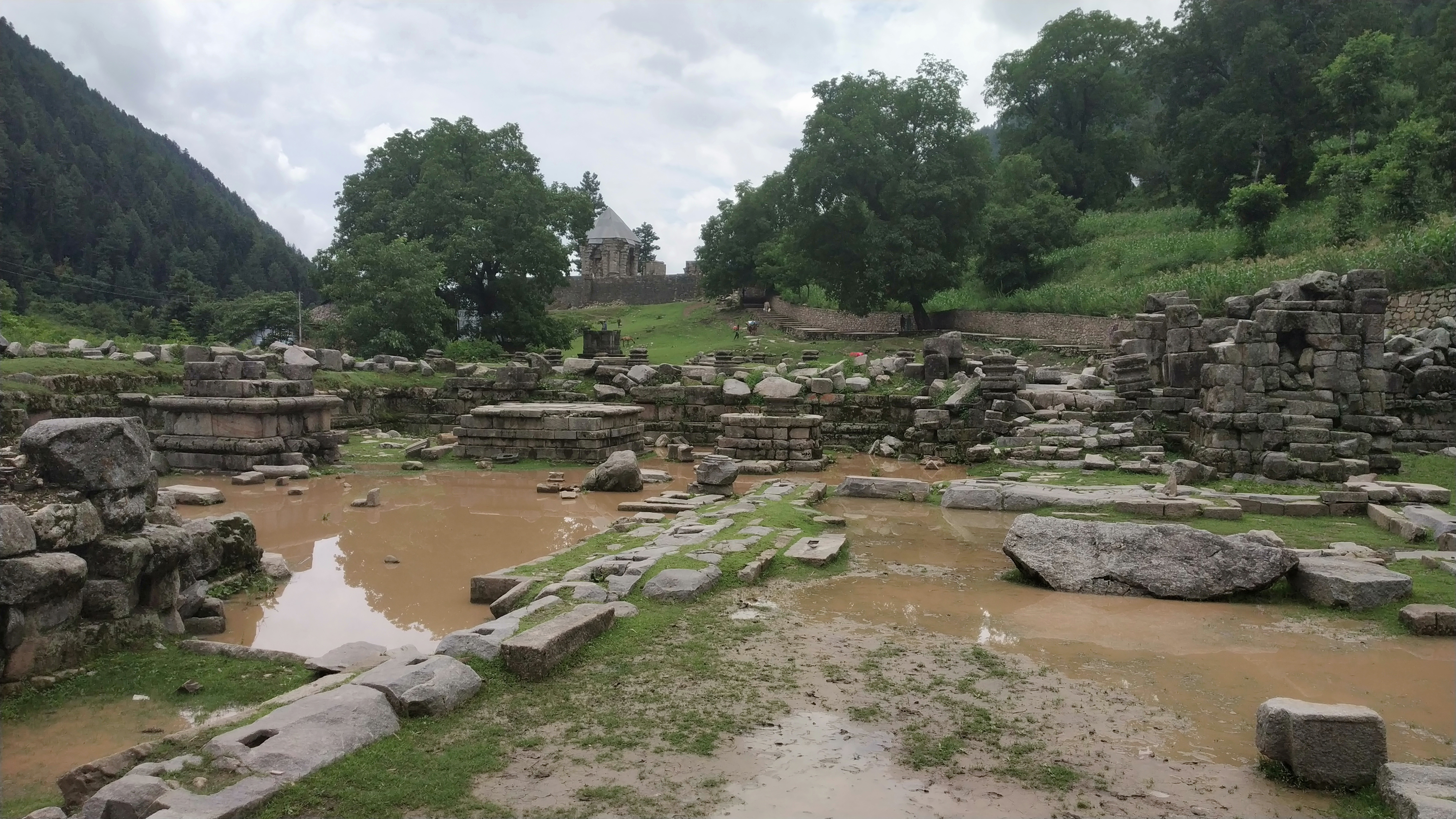
View of the western complex and central pavilion from the eastern complex

Bishop Crowie and Major Cole have identified the ruins of seventeen temple structures of various ages and dimensions in Buthser, near Wangath, in two distinct groups: the first on the western side and the second on the eastern side. Each group is enclosed by a separate stone wall, and lie a short distance from one another. The temple complex is located along the Kanka nadi or the Kanaknai and is constructed of local grey granite. Between the two groups of temples stand a number of structures of a third group, the Mathas.

=== Western complex ===
The first group of six temples, also identified by Aurel Stein as Shiva-Jyestharudra or Shiva-Jyeshthesa, is situated within an enclosure wall. The Jyestharudra group is placed on high grounds and consists of a main temple of Jyeshthesa (Shiva) surrounded by subsidiary shrines. The principal structure is a square of 25 feet (7.6 m) externally and 17 feet (5.2 m) internally, and has two entrances opposite each other, facing the northeast and southwest. In the center of the floor is a square space which is unpaved. It marks the site of the pedestal of the image. Internally, it has a domed ceiling. Externally, the roof is pyramidal.

=== Eastern complex ===
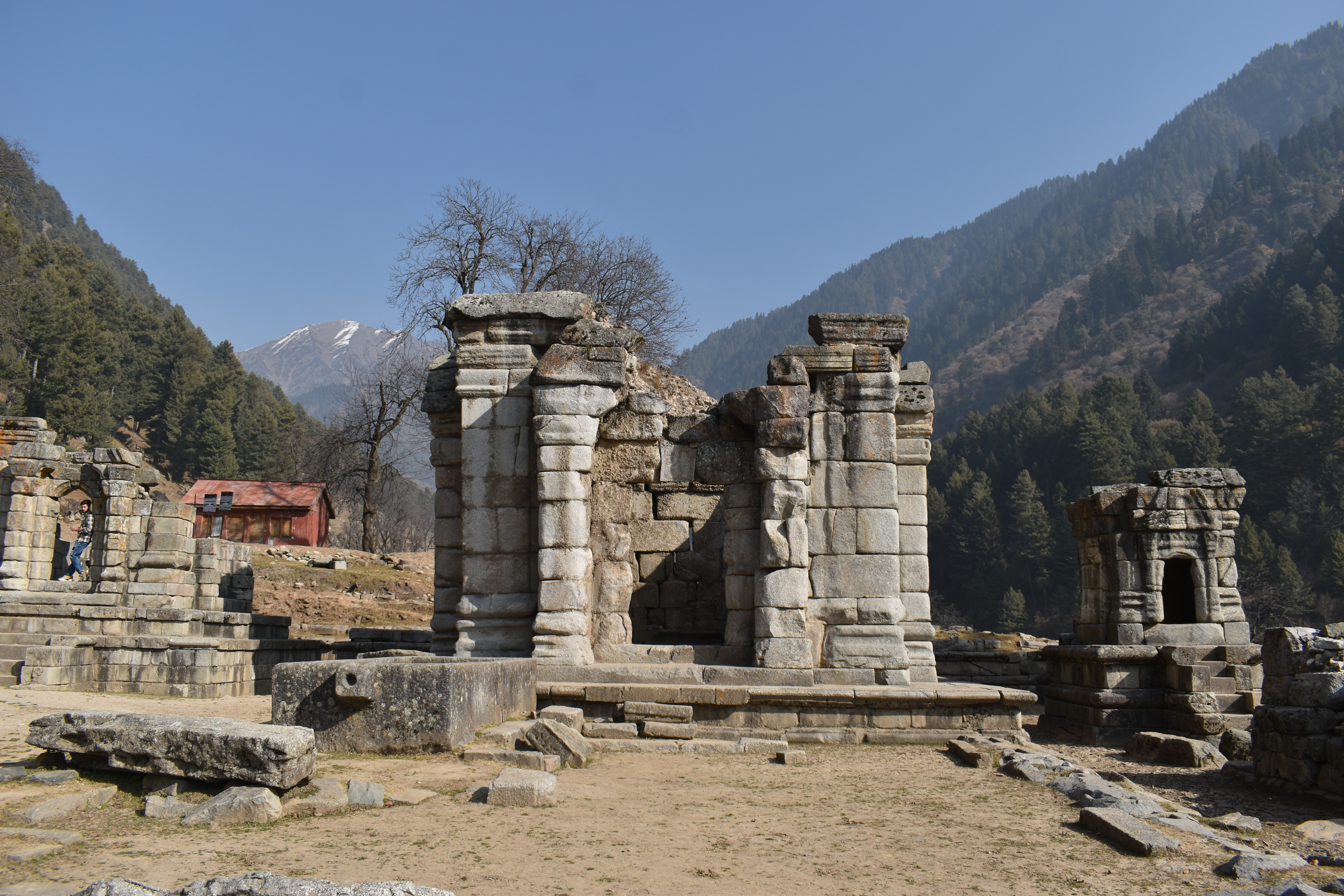
Structures of the eastern complex

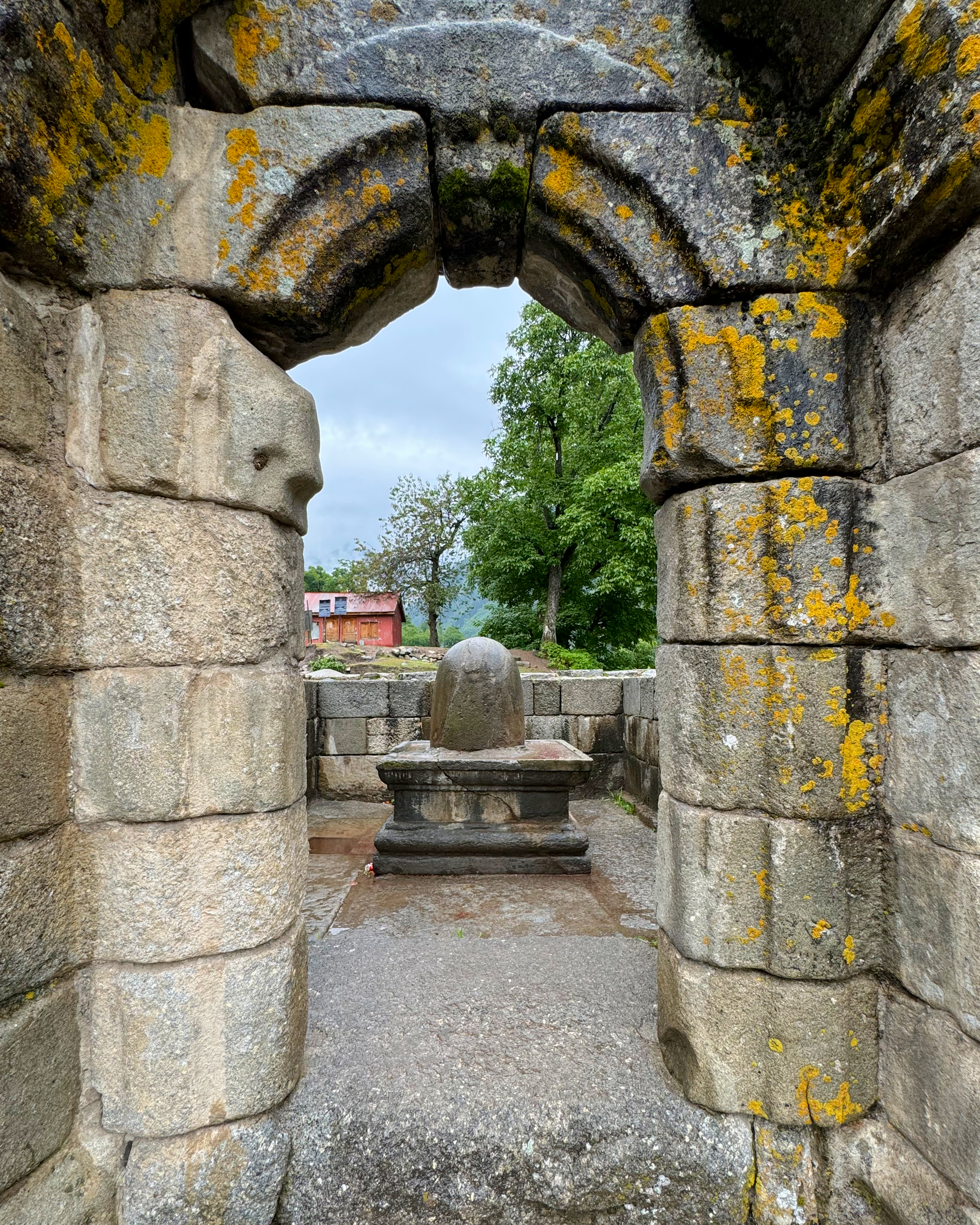
Shivling at a temple in the eastern complex

The second group of temples is enclosed in a massive rectangular stone wall, pierced by a two-chambered gateway. The six temples inside the wall are in ruins and are partly buried in the ground. The largest temple has a 17 feet (5.2 m) square base internally, similar to the largest temple in the western complex. This temple has been identified by Stein as Shiva-Bhuteshwara.

=== Central pavilion ===
Between the western and eastern complexes lie a number of structures of a third group. This consists of the remains of a building measuring 120 feet (37 m) by 70 feet (21 m), with a height of 10 feet (3.0 m). Along the side of this structure are 30 monolithic bases or piers at intervals of 12 feet (3.7 m). This was a pillared pavilion or matha. An impressive 18 feet (5.5 m) rectangular cistern, hammered out of a boulder, is nearby.

== Status ==
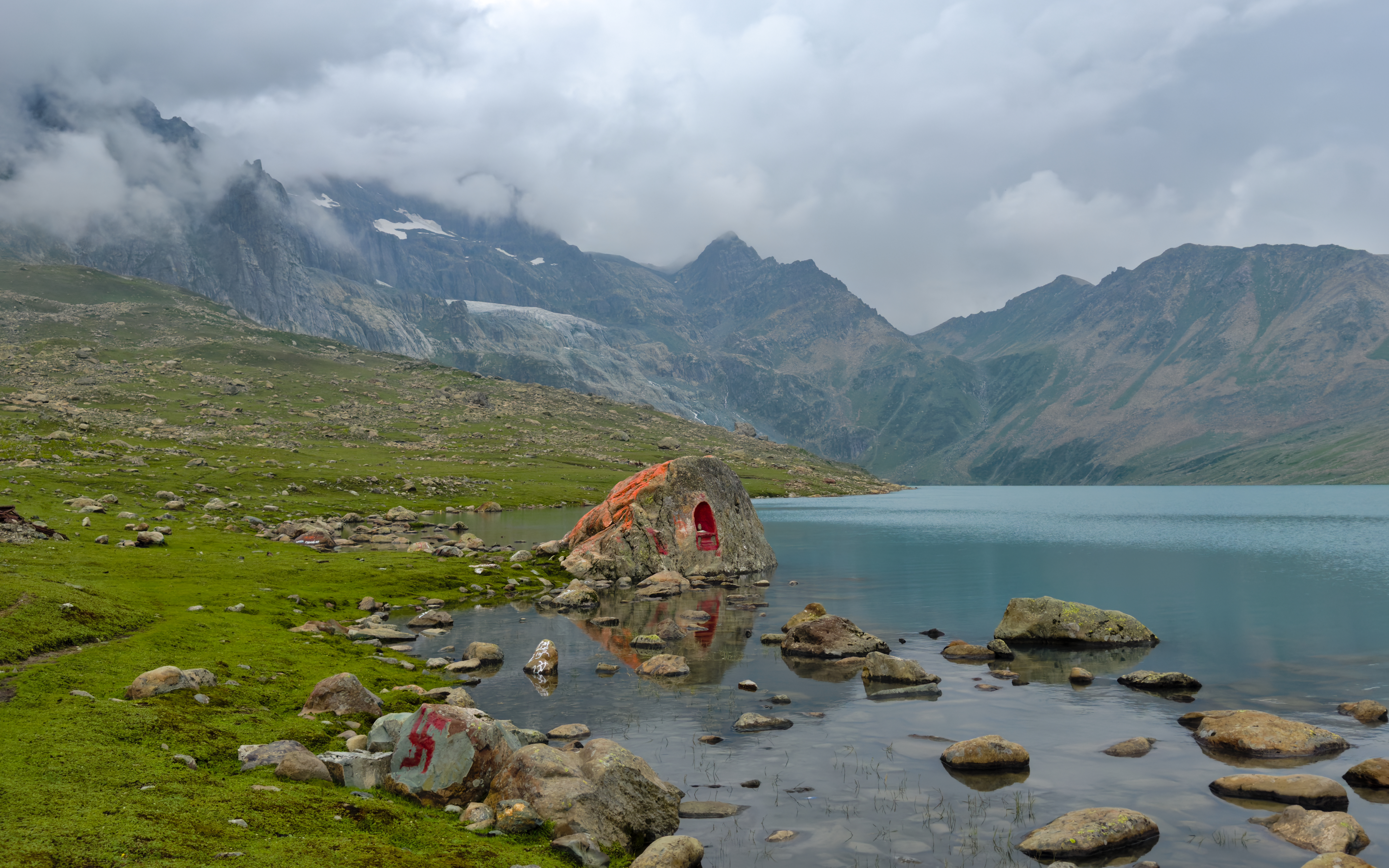
Shiva shrine at the Gangabal Lake in the mountains above the temple complex

=== Worship ===
The Temple complex is the starting point of an annual Hindu pilgrimage or yatra, and is used for worship and rituals. The pilgrimage culminates at the Gangabal Lake which is considered by Hindus to be an abode of Shiva and where Kashmiri Hindus immerse the ashes of their dead after cremation.

=== Site of national importance ===
The Archaeological Survey of India has declared the Wangath Temple complex at Naranag as centrally protected monuments of India. The temple appears in the list of "centrally protected monuments" as "Group of Ancient Temples" at Naranag, Kangan.
