= Martand Sun Temple =

Hindu temple in Jammu and Kashmir, India

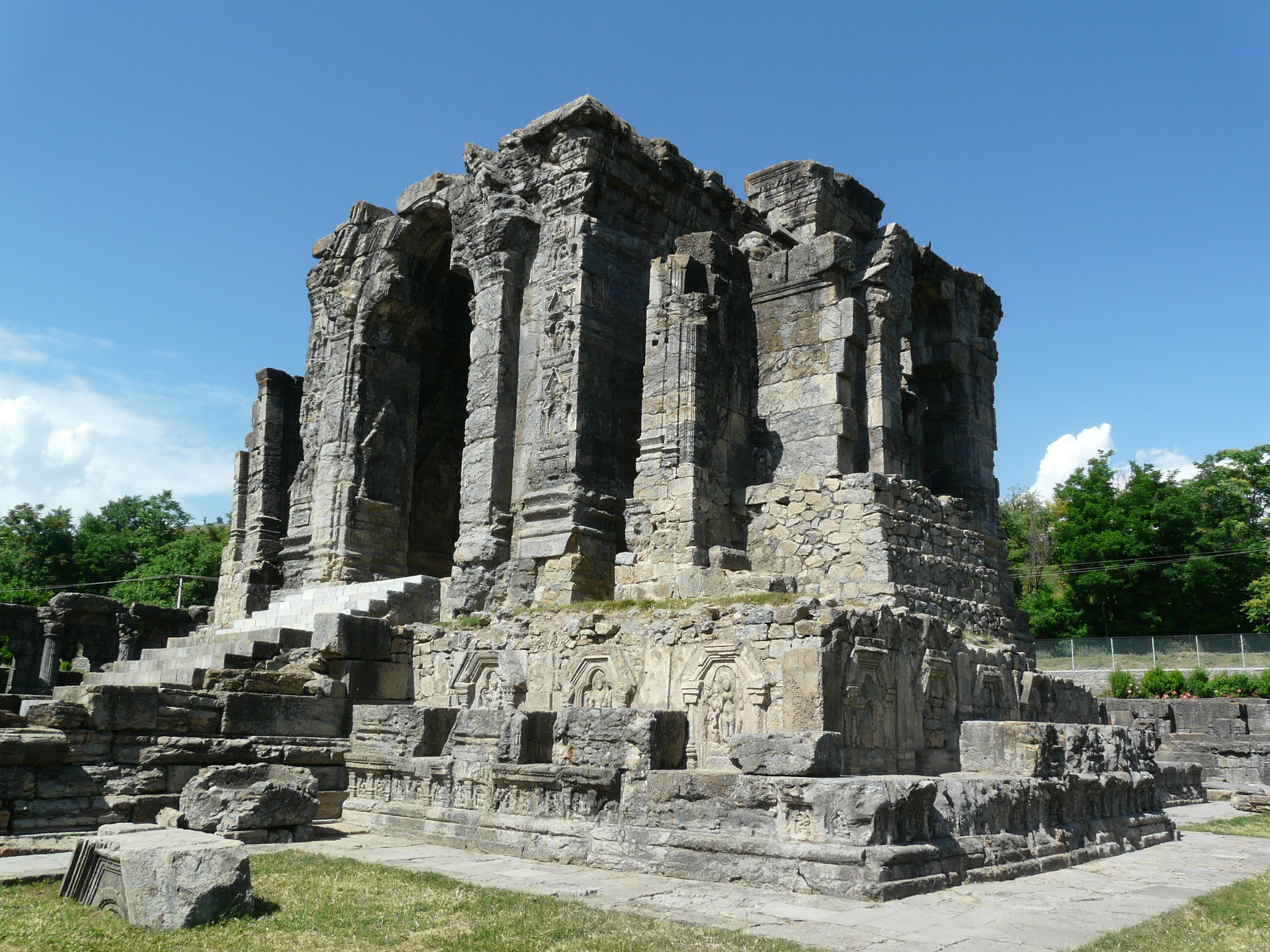
- Central shrine of the temple ruins

- Location within Indian State of Jammu and Kashmir Location within India

Religion
- Affiliation: Hinduism
- District: Anantnag district
- Deity: Surya (Martand)

Location
- Location: Mattan
- State: Jammu and Kashmir
- Country: India
- Coordinates: 33°44′44″N 75°13′13″E

Architecture
- Type: Ancient Indian
- Creator: Lalitaditya Muktapida
- Completed: 8th century CE
- Demolished: 15th century CE

The Martand Sun Temple is a Hindu temple located in Mattan, in the Anantnag district of the Kashmir Valley of Jammu and Kashmir, India. It dates back to the eighth century CE and was dedicated to Surya, the solar deity in Hinduism; Surya is also known by the Sanskrit-language synonym Martand (मार्तण्ड, Mārtaṇḍa). The temple was destroyed by Sikandar Shah Miri.

== History ==
=== Establishment ===
According to Kalhana, the Martand Sun Temple was commissioned by Lalitaditya Muktapida in the eighth century CE.

=== Destruction ===
According to Jonaraja (fl. 1430) as well as Hasan Ali, the temple was destroyed by Sikandar Shah Miri (1389-1413) in a zeal to Islamise society under the advice of Sufi preacher Mir Muhammad Hamadani; (Note: Son of Mir Sayyid Ali Hamadani (1314-1384), a Sufi preacher of the Kubrawiya order who had migrated from Huttalàn (present-day Tajikistan) in the wake of Timurid invasions to Shibu'd-Din's Kashmir.) Jonaraja pinned the blame on his chief-counsel Suhabhatta, a Brahman neo-convert who was held to have manifested a reign of intense persecution for the local Hindus, whereas Ali particularly affirmed Sikandar's convictions in these aspects.

Scholars caution against accepting these sources at face value — Jonaraja was appointed by Sikandar's son, who sought to bring back the Brahminical elite into the royal fold, while later Muslim chroniclers had their motives to fit the past into an idealist tale of orthodox Islamic morality. According to Chitralekha Zutshi and Richard G. Salomon, Sikandar's policies were guided by realpolitik and, like with the previous Hindu rulers, an attempt to secure political legitimacy by asserting state power over Brahmans and gaining access to wealth controlled by Brahminical institutions. J. L. Bhan notes a stone sculpture—a four-armed Brahma, sculpted by the son of a Buddhist Sanghapati and dedicated to Sikandar—to challenge simplistic notions of religious persecution. Slaje disagrees about the absence of religious motivations but notes the aversion of Brahmin chroniclers to be, largely, the result of resistance to the gradual disintegration of caste-hierarchy under Muslim influence.

=== Degradation ===
The ruins and the remnants of the structure suffered further damage from several earthquakes.

== Architecture ==
The Martand temple was built on top of a plateau from where one can view the whole of the Kashmir Valley. From the ruins and related archaeological findings, it can be said that it was an excellent specimen of Kashmiri architecture, which had blended the Gandharan, Gupta, Chinese and possibly Syrian-Byzantine forms of architecture.

The temple has a colonnaded courtyard, with its primary shrine in its center and surrounded by 84 smaller shrines, stretching 220 feet long and 142 feet broad in total and incorporating a smaller temple that was previously built. The temple turns out to be the largest example of a peristyle in Kashmir and is complex due to its various chambers that are proportional in size and aligned with the overall perimeter of the temple. In Hindu temple architecture, the primary entrance to the temple is situated on the western side of the quadrangle and is the same width as the temple itself, creating grandeur. The entrance is highly reflective of the temple as a whole due to its elaborate decoration and allusion to the deities worshiped inside. The primary shrine is located in a centralised structure (the temple proper) that is thought to have had a pyramidal top - a common feature of the temples in Kashmir. Various wall carvings in the antechamber of the temple proper depict other gods, such as Vishnu, and river goddesses, such as Ganga and Yamuna, in addition to the sun-god Surya.

Martand Sun Temple

Ruins in c. 1870

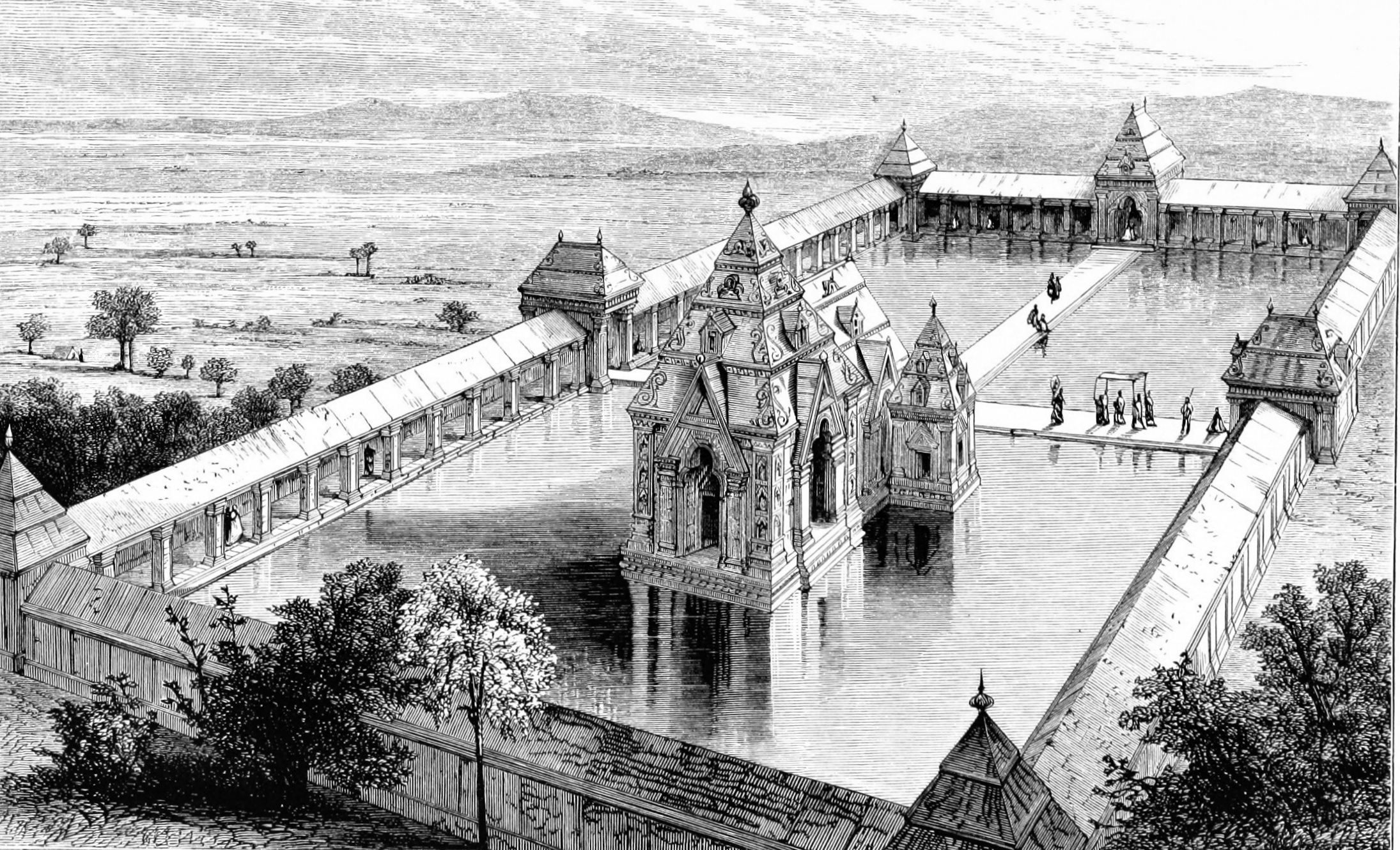
Restored impression by J. Duguid (1870–73)

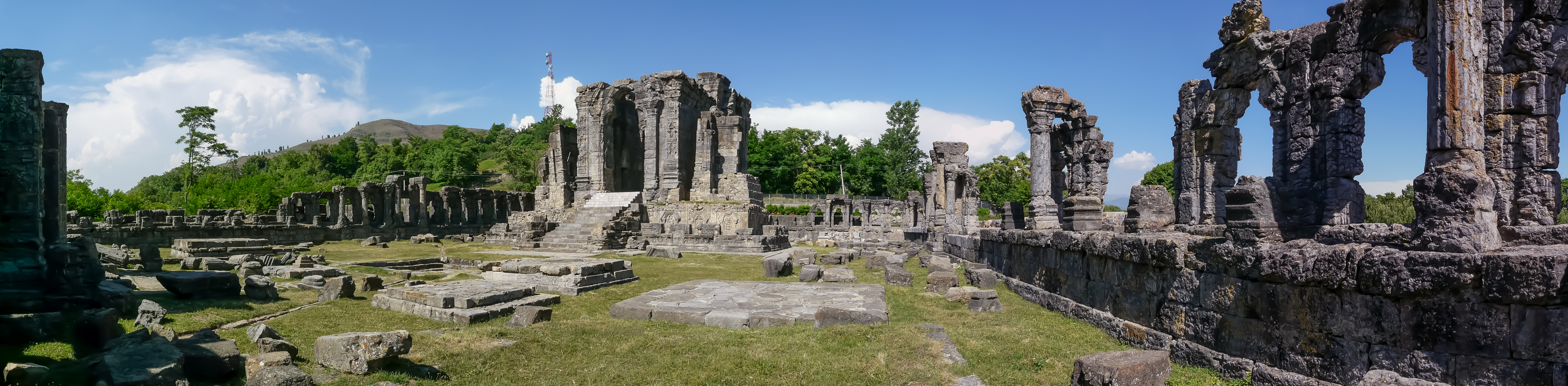
Panorama of the ruins in the summer of 2011

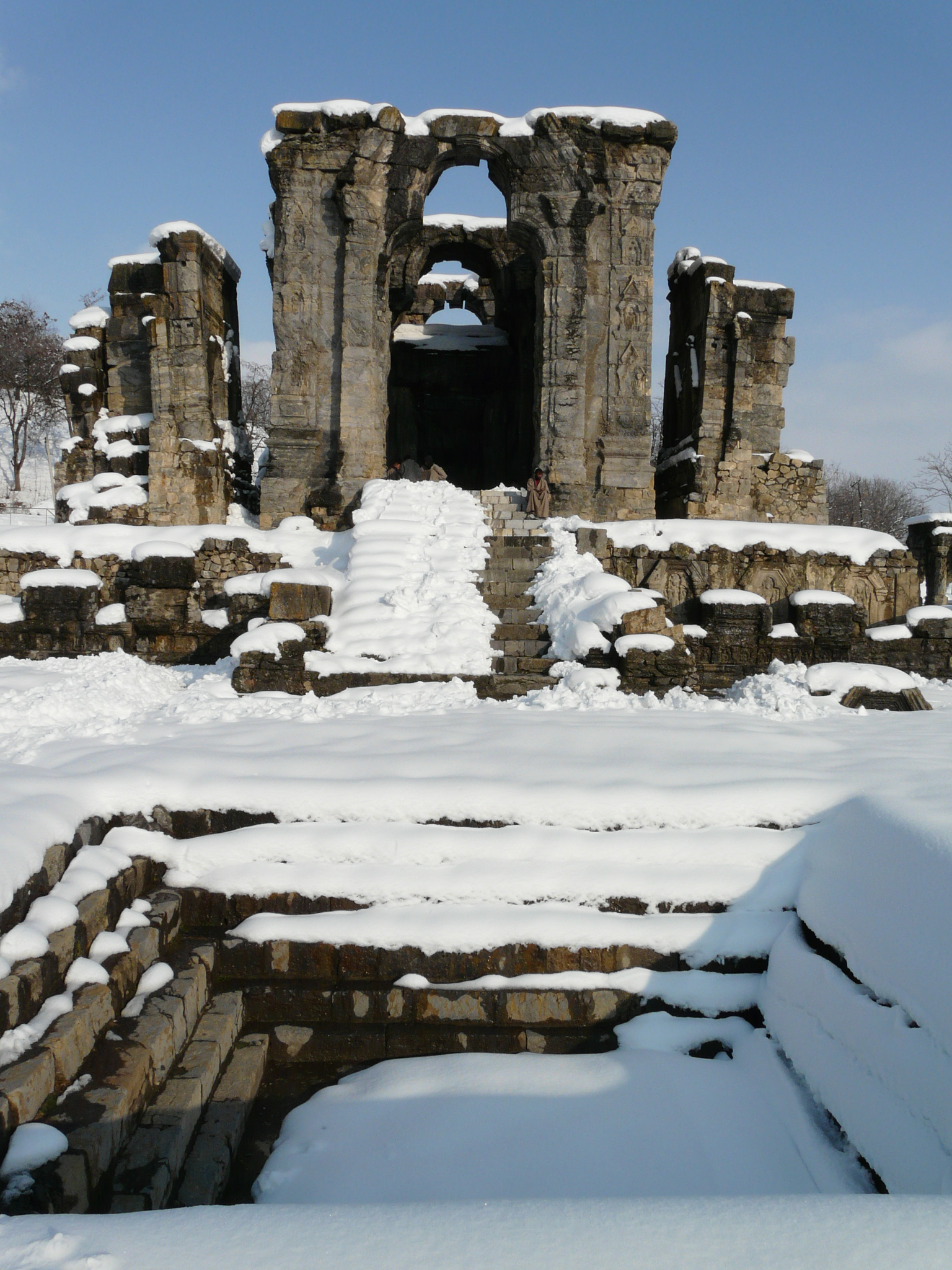
Ruins in winter of 2012

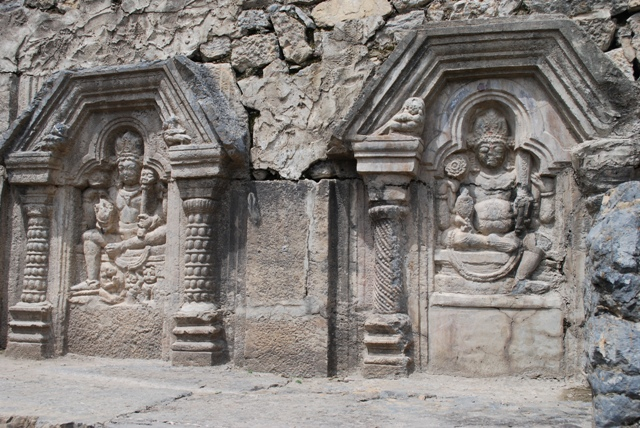
Inscriptions within the temple ruins

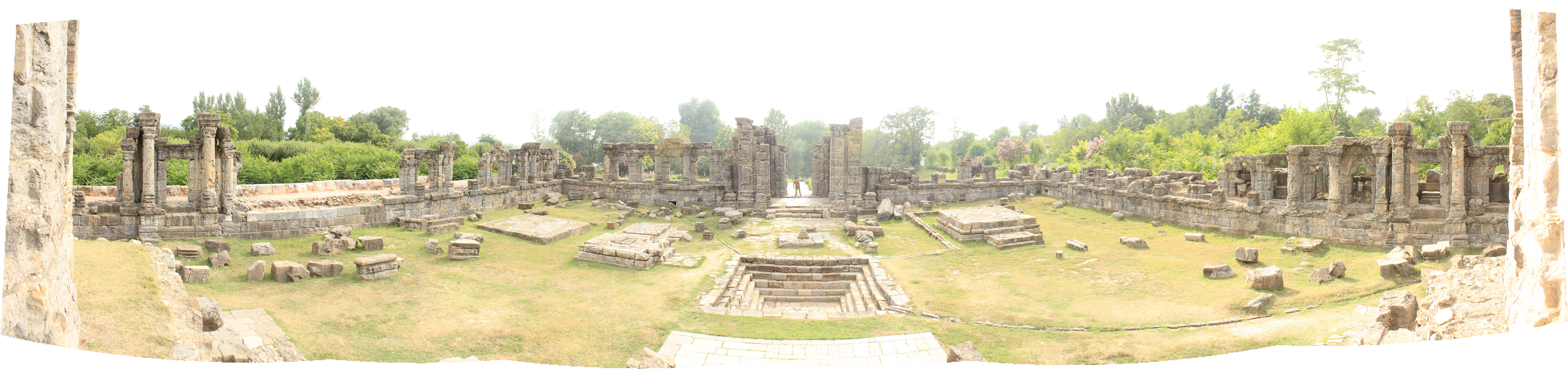
Temple ruins as seen from the entrance to the main temple structure

== Conservation ==
The Archaeological Survey of India has declared the Martand Sun Temple as a site of national importance in Jammu and Kashmir. The temple appears in the list of centrally protected monuments as Martanda (Sun Temple).

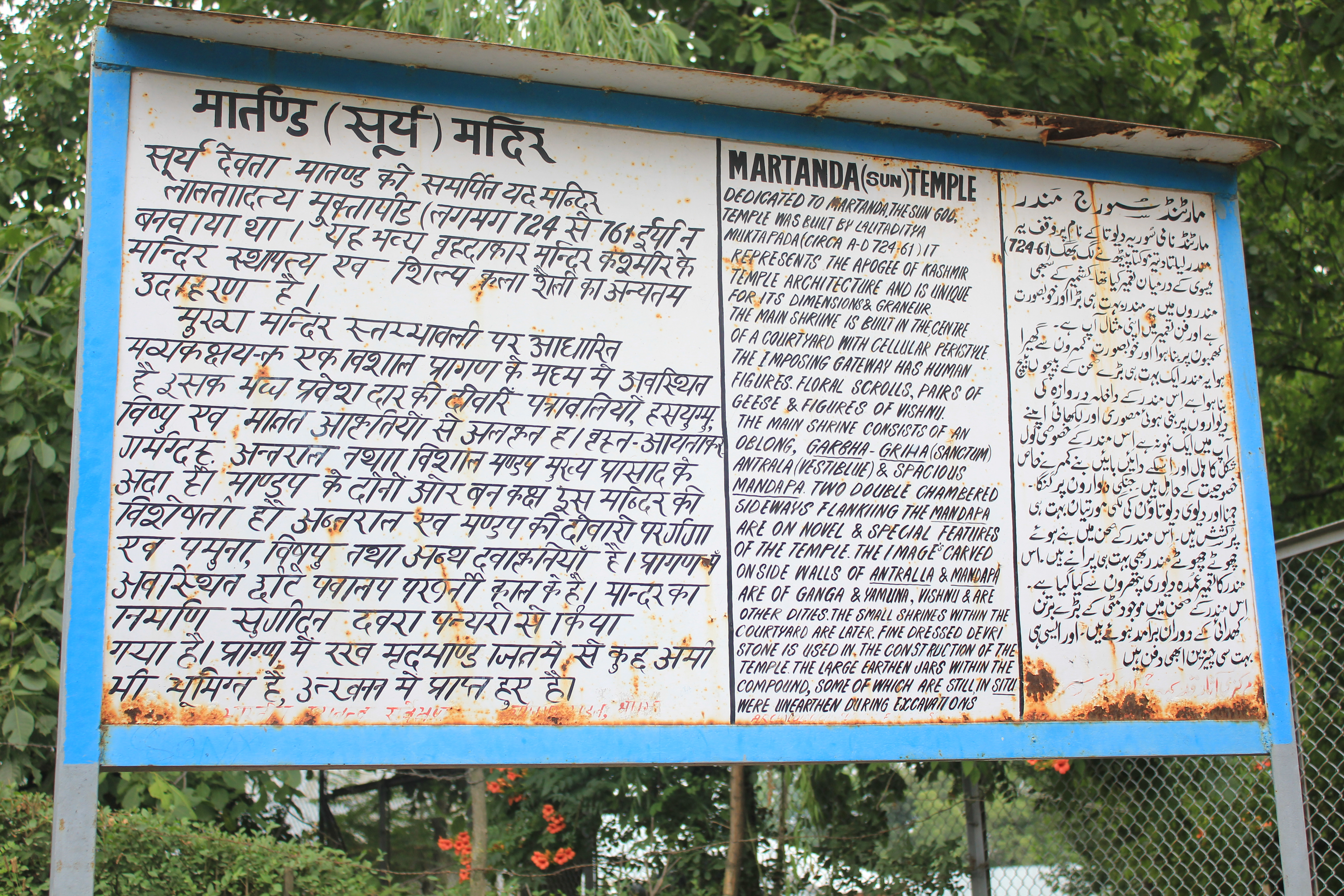
Details sign — ASI

== Restoration ==
In March 2024, the Jammu and Kashmir government initiated efforts to restore the temple.

== In popular culture ==
- 1970: The Hindi film Man Ki Aankhen starring Dharmendra and Waheeda Rahman has Martand Temple as background for the Rafi-Lata song Chala Bhi Aa Aaja Rasiya.
- 1975: The Hindi film Aandhi starring Sanjeev Kumar and Suchitra Sen has Martand Temple as background for the Kishore-Lata song "Tere Bina Zindagi Se Koi Shikwa Nahiin".
- 2014: The temple was selected as the background for the song "Bismil", in the Hindi film Haider, modelled on Hamlet in the backdrop of the Kashmir conflict. Certain Kashmiri Pandits claimed that the site was depicted as a "den of evil"—hurting their sentiments in the process—and sought a ban.
