= Ushkur =

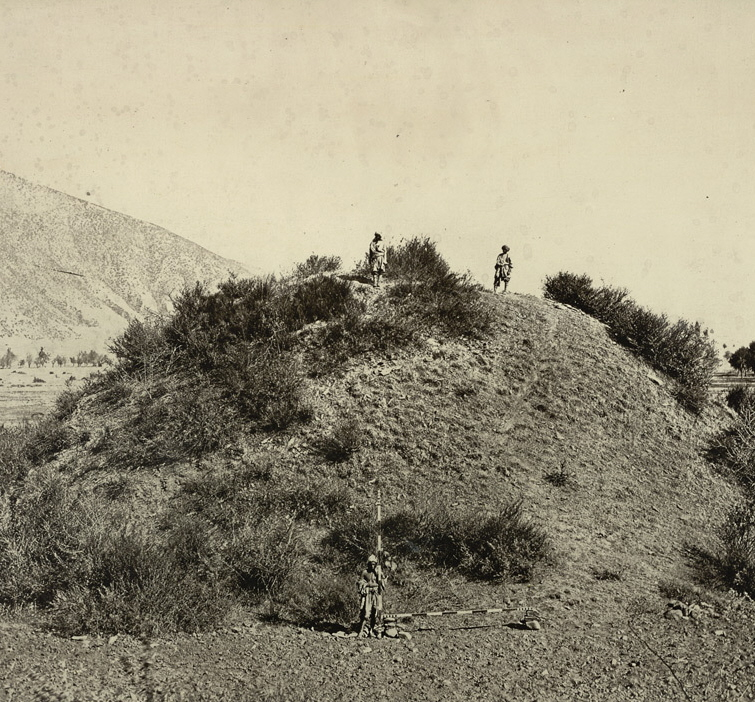
Stupa Jayendra Vihar near Baramulla, during excavations in 1869

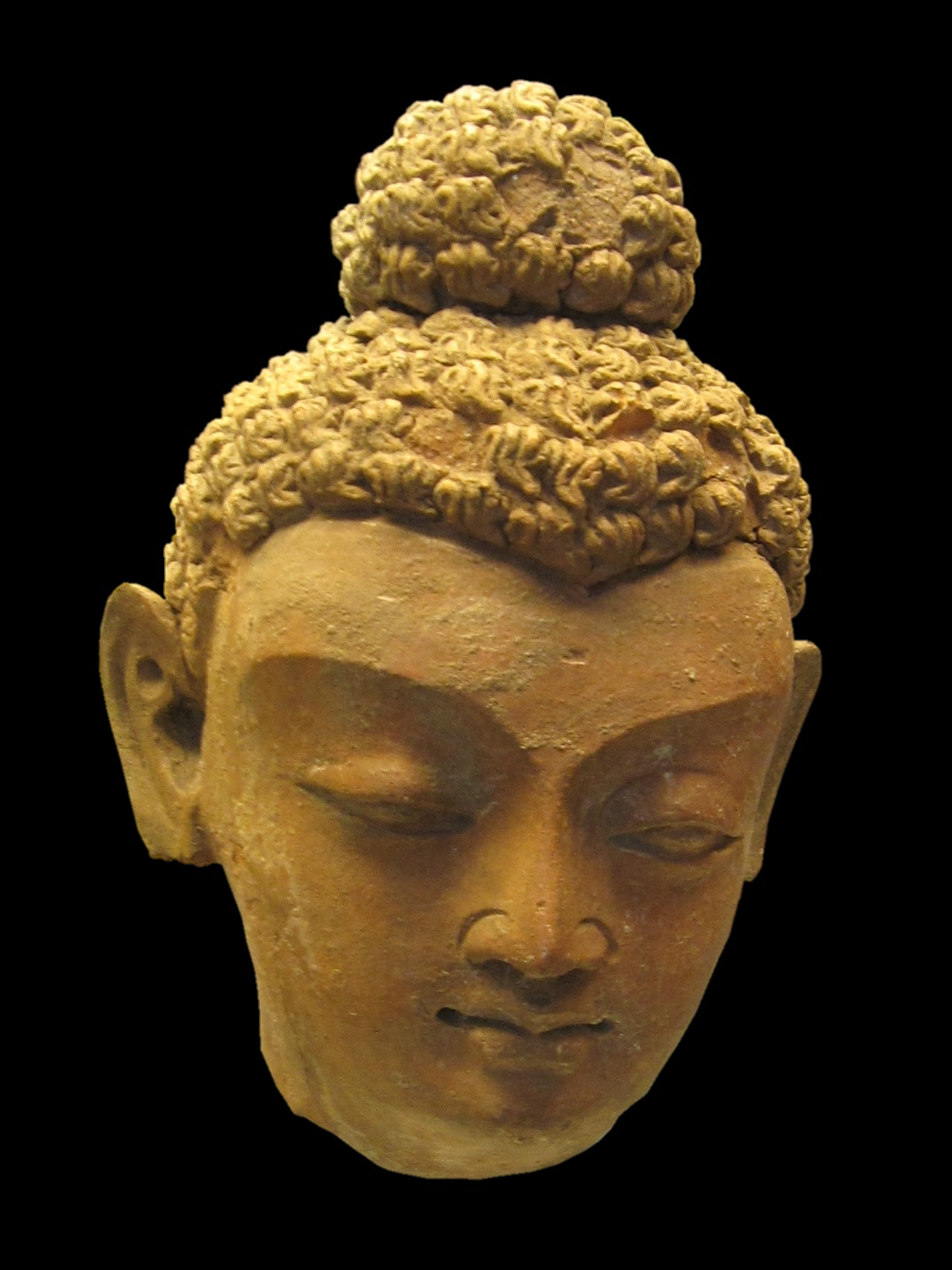
Terracotta head of the Buddha, probably from Ushkur (7th–8th century CE)

Ushkur is an ancient Buddhist site near Baramulla in Jammu and Kashmir, India.

Baramulla is located on the Jhelum river around 55 km from the capital city Srinagar. It was an important trading centre during British rule, as it formed the western entrance to the Kashmir Valley. "The town of Huṣkapura is undoubtedly the modern Uṣkűr, situated opposite to Varămul (Skr. Varāhamūla, vulgo Bāramūla) on the left bank of the Vitastā where the latter leaves the Valley of Kaçmlr."

== History ==
Ushkur was called Hushkapur in ancient times. Hushkapur was said to have been founded by King Huvishka of the Kushan dynasty. The Buddhist Kushans ruled parts of Afghanistan and northern India, including Kashmir, during the first three centuries CE. The Chinese monk Xuanzang spent a night here in 630 CE on his way to the main centres of Kashmir; he described Ushkur as a flourishing centre of Buddhism. It was also visited by the Chinese Buddhist monk Wukong in 759 CE.

The site has several stupas. A stupa was found and excavated in the 1870s. Henry Hardy Cole's Archaeological Survey of India report of 1869 claimed, "The locality which includes the remains of a Monastery is called the 'Jayendra Vihar', and the erection is assigned by local tradition to one 'Praverasena' in A.D. 500." Excavations have unearthed the remains of several finely-modelled terracotta heads in the Gandharan style, which are displayed in the British Museum and others.

General CUNNINGHAM, l. c., p. 100, states that Rev. G. W. Cowie who visited Uṣkũr on his behalf (probably in 1865), found there a 'Buddhist Stūpa quite instact' [sic - read 'intact']. It was not destined to remain so much longer. In the summer of 1891 when I first visited the spot, I found there only a mass of shapeless débris covering the site of what was once the Stūpa referred to. According to the villagers' statements the mound had been dug into years ago by some 'Sahib's' orders. He appears to have found there some relics and in the course of his excavations to have levelled the structure to the ground. I have not been able to trace any report of this "exploration".
