= Mattan, Jammu and Kashmir =

Martand East Anantnag, Martand
- Town and Tehsil
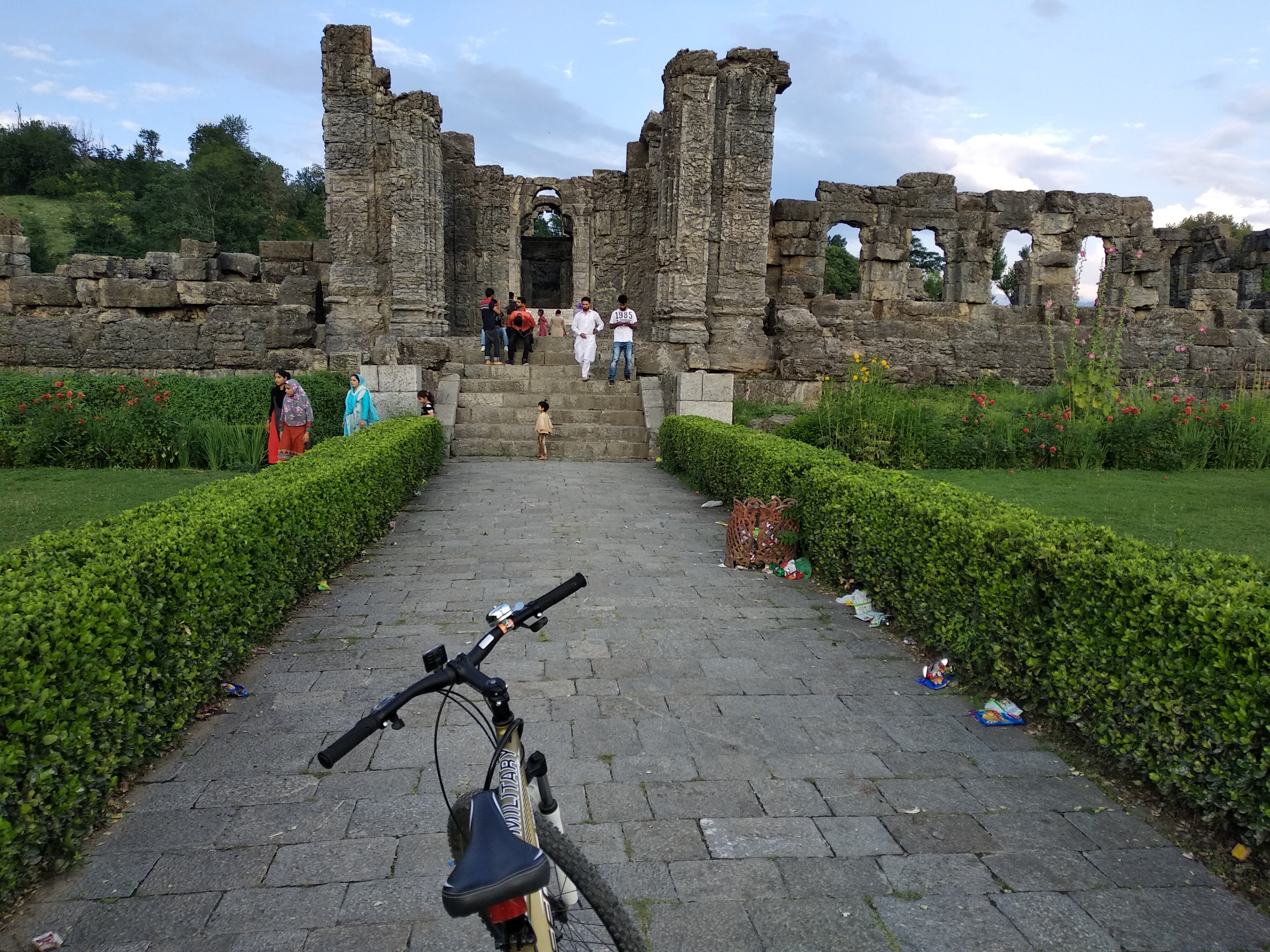
- View of Mattan in Anantnag district (J&K)

- Location in Jammu and Kashmir, India Martand (India)
- Coordinates: 33.775391°N 75.206673°E
- Country: India
- State: Jammu and Kashmir
- District: Anantnag

Population (2011)
  - Total: 9,246
  - Density: 3,698/km^{2} (9,580/sq mi)

Languages
  - Official: Kashmiri, Urdu, Hindi, Dogri, English
- Time zone: UTC+5:30 (IST)
- Vehicle registration: JK-03

Mattan (originally, Martand) is a town, tehsil and a notified area committee, near Anantnag city in the Anantnag district of the Indian union territory of Jammu and Kashmir.

== Demographics ==
Religion in Mattan town (2011)
Religion	Percent
Islam	85.02%
Hinduism	9.18%
Sikhism	5.34%
Other or not stated	0.46%

As of 2001 India census, Mattan had a population of 9,246. Males constitute 55.2% of the population and females 44.8%. Mattan has an average literacy rate of 73%, higher than the union territory average of 67.16%: male literacy is around 82.77%, and female literacy is 61.38%.

The population of children aged 0-6 is 1353 which is 14.63% of total population of Mattan (MC). In Mattan Municipal Committee, the female sex ratio is 813 against state average of 889. Moreover, the child sex ratio in Mattan is around 958 compared to Jammu and Kashmir state average of 862.

== See also ==
- Martand Sun Temple
