= Mārtanda =

Eighth and last of the Vedic solar deities known as Adityas in Hinduism

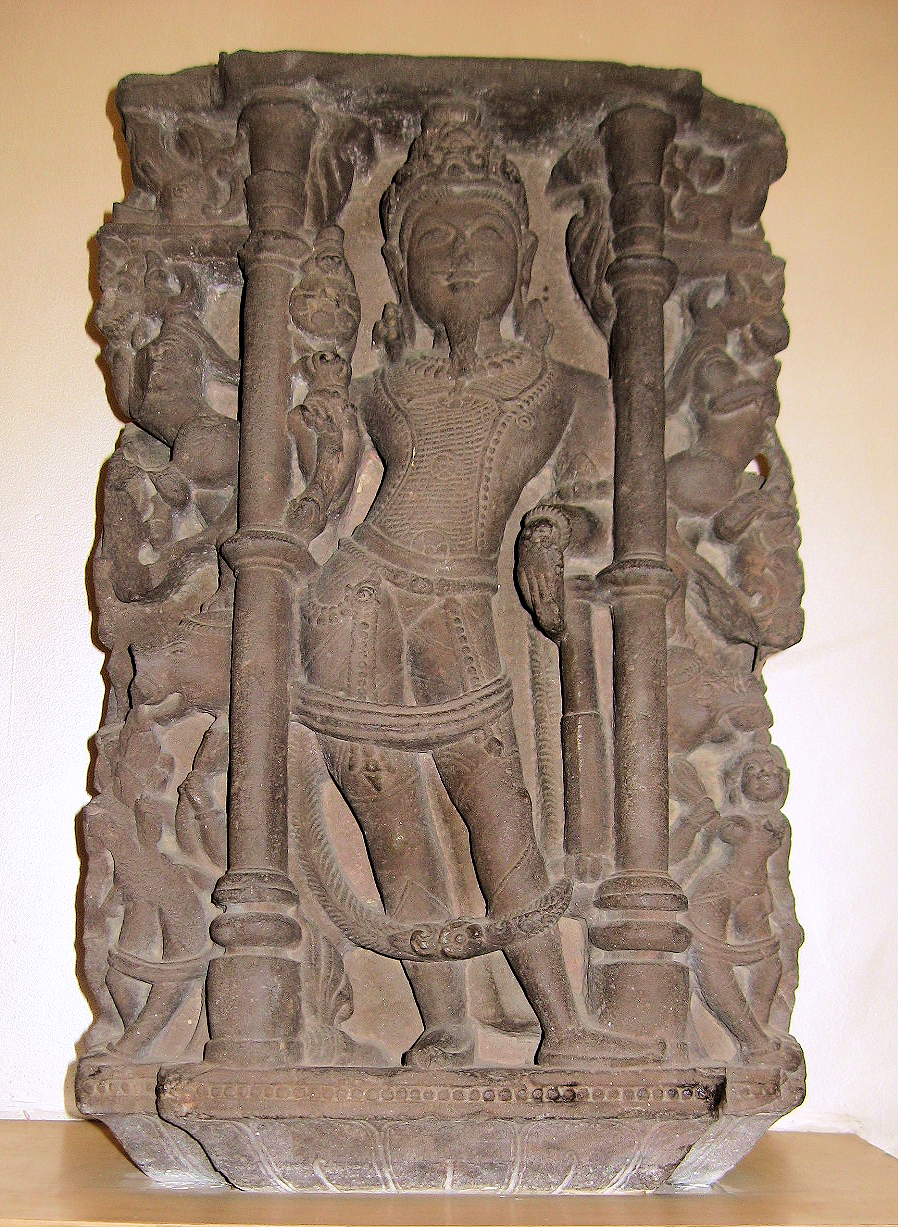
Martanda (an aspect of the Sun-God or Surya), Gahadavala dynasty, Rajasthan, 12th century CE

Martanda (Sanskrit: मार्तण्ड) in Hinduism is the eighth and last of the Vedic solar deities called Adityas. He is known as an Aditya by virtue of being born to Aditi.

== Etymology ==
Mârtânda is etymologically derived from mârta, meaning “dead or undeveloped” (a word connected with mrita, the past participle of mri, "to die") and ânda, "an egg or a bird". The name denotes a dead sun, or a sun that has sunk below the horizon.

== Mentions ==
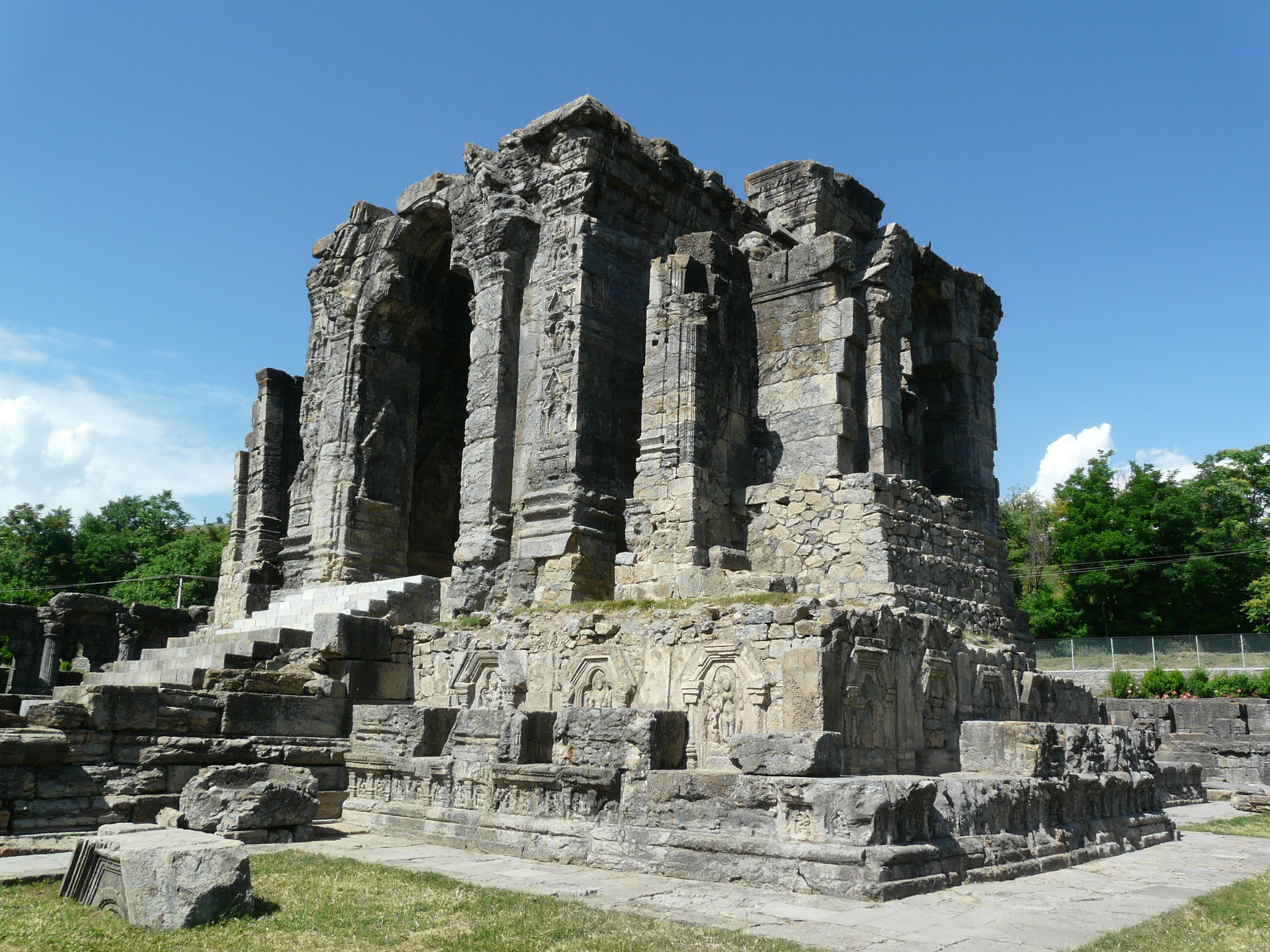
Martand Sun temple, built in 8th-century CE in Anantnag, Jammu and Kashmir is dedicated to Mārtanda.

Book 10, Hymn 72 of the Rigveda has the following verse:

Eight are the Sons of Aditi who from her body sprang to life.
With seven she went to meet the Gods she cast Martanda far away.
So with her Seven Sons Aditi went forth to meet the earlier age. She brought
Martanda thitherward to spring to life and die again.

Aditi at first had only seven sons but later gave birth to an eighth son named Mārtanda. Although many hymns in the Rigveda mention him along with the other Adityas as a form of Surya, as evident from the verse above, Aditi shunned him.

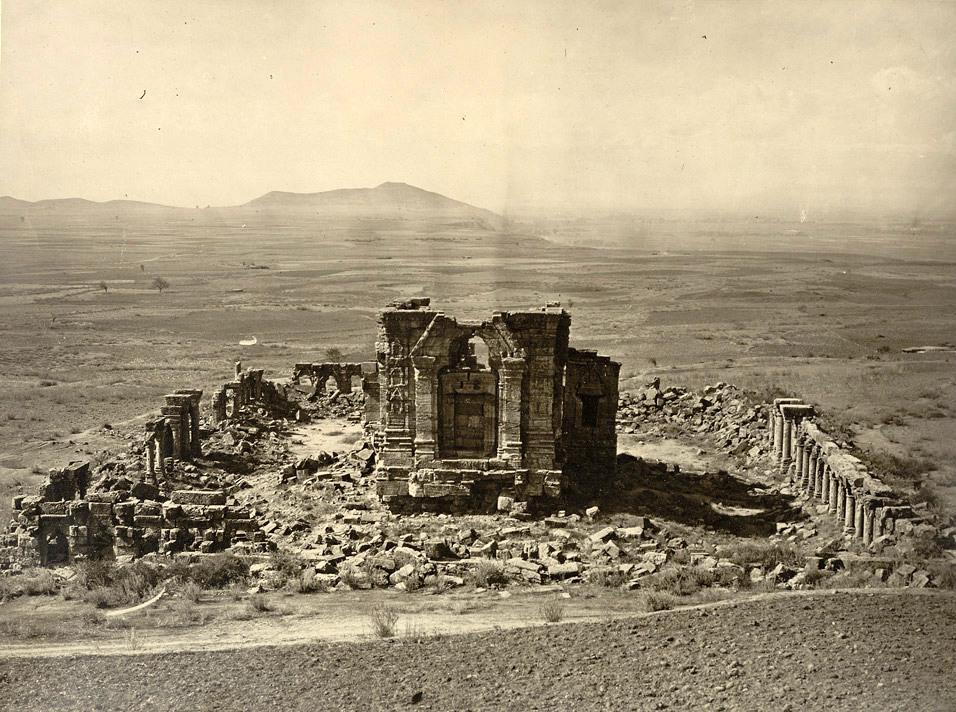
Surya temple at Martand, photographed by John Burke, 1868.

The Taittirîya Aranyaka reads:

Tat parâ Mârtândam â abharat
(She set aside Mârtânda for birth and death)

The Aranyaka then proceeds to give the names of the eight sons as Mitra, Varuna, Dhâtṛi, Aryaman, Amsha, Bhaga, Indra and Vivasvat. But no further explanation is added, nor is it told which of these eight sons represented Mârtânda.

In the post-Vedic period, when the number of Adityas increased to twelve, the name Vivasvat was added to the canon. Vivasvat and Martanda are often used interchangeably.

Martand Sun temple in Anantnag, Jammu and Kashmir is dedicated to Mārtanda. Today the temple is in ruins and Martanda is no longer venerated there. However a temple complex nearby named Martand Tirth serves as a modern replacement.

== See also ==
- List of Hindu deities
- Martand Sun Temple
