= Nepora =

- Village
- Location in Jammu & Kashmir, India Nepora (India)
- Coordinates: 33.7458°N 75.0887°E
- Country: India
- Union Territory: Jammu & Kashmir
- Division: Kashmir
- District: Anantnag

Area
  - Total: 111 ha (270 acres)

Population (2011)
  - Total: 3,163
  - Density: 2,850/km^{2} (7,380/sq mi)

Languages
  - Spoken: Kashmiri, Urdu, English
- Time zone: UTC+5:30 (IST)
- PIN: 192101

Nepora or Nipor is a village in Anantnag tehsil of Anantnag district in the Kashmir Valley of Jammu and Kashmir, India. This village lies on the border of Anantnag district, alongside Kulgam district and acts as a bordering village between two districts. The nearest railway station is Sadura railway station. A tributary of river Jhelum 'Sandran' flows through the village.

== Demographics ==
The Nepora village consist of 3,163 and the residents mostly speak the Kashmiri language. While Urdu is also spoken as second language.

== Transport ==
=== By Rail ===
Sadura Railway Station & Anantnag Railway Station are the closest railway stations to Nepora. However, Jammu Tawi Railway Station is another major railway station 243 km away from Nepora.

=== By Road ===
Srinagar-Kanyakumari road -NH 44 is the nearest Highway. The village will come on the right side of this road when you are going to Srinagar.

=== By Air ===
The nearest airport is Srinagar International Airport or Sheikh-ul-Alam Airport (IATA: SXR, ICAO: VISR), which is approximately some 60 km away.
