= Brenti Bat Pora =

Brinty Batpora Breent
- Village
- Location in Jammu and Kashmir, India Brinty Batpora (India)
- Coordinates: 33.7458°N 75.0887°E
- Country: India
- State: Jammu and Kashmir
- District: Anantnag district

Area
  - Total: 523.7 ha (1,294 acres)

Population (2018)
  - Total: 2,500
  - Density: 480/km^{2} (1,200/sq mi)

Languages
  - Official: Kashmiri, Urdu, Hindi
- Time zone: UTC+5:30 (IST)
- PIN: 192210

Brinty Bat Pora village is located in Anantnag tehsil of Anantnag district in Jammu and Kashmir, India.

== Demographics ==
According to Census 2011 information, the location code or village code of Brenti Bat Pora village is 003700. Brinty Batpora village is located in Anantnag tehsil of Anantnag district in Jammu and Kashmir, India. It is situated 7 km (4.3 mi) away from Anantnag, which is both district and sub-district headquarter of Brinty Batpora village.

The total area of the village is 523.7 ha (1,294 acres). Brinty Batpora has a total population of 5,988 people. There are about 885 houses in Brinty Batpora village. Achabal is nearest town to Brinty Batpora which is approximately 3 km (1.9 mi) away.

== Transport ==
=== Rail ===
Sadura Railway Station & Anantnag Railway Station are the very near by railway stations to Brenti Bat Pora. However ever Jammu Tawi Railway Station is major railway station 243 km near to Brenti Bat Pora.
