= Luk Bawan =

- Village
- Location in Jammu and Kashmir Luk Bawan (India)
- Coordinates: 33°N 75°E
- Country: India
- State: Jammu and Kashmir
- District: Anantnag
- Elevation: 1,596 m (5,236 ft)

Languages
  - Official: Kashmiri, Urdu, Hindi, Dogri, English
- Time zone: UTC+5:30 (IST)
- PIN: 192213
- Website: anantnag.nic.in

Luk Bawan is a village in Doru Shahabad Tehsil of Anantnag district in Jammu and Kashmir, India.

== Transport ==
=== By Rail ===
Sadura Railway Station and Anantnag Railway Station are the very near by railway stations to Luk Bawan. However ever Jammu Tawi Railway Station is major railway station 243 km near to Luk Bawan.
