= Kabamarg =

- Village
- Location in Anantnag, India Kabamarg (India)
- Coordinates: 33.647090°N 75.163638°E
- Country: India
- State: Jammu and Kashmir
- District: Anantnag

Languages
  - Official: Kashmiri, Urdu, Hindi, Dogri, English
- Time zone: UTC+5:30 (IST)
- Postal code: 192214
- Vehicle registration: JK03

Kabamarg is a village in Doru Shahabad Tehsils in Anantnag district in Jammu and Kashmir. Due to the presence of a relic of Muhammad, the shrine at Kabamarg is famous in the whole valley.

== Demographics ==
Kashmiri is the local language here. Also people speaks Hindi and Urdu .

== Transport ==
=== By Rail ===
Sadura Railway Station and Anantnag Railway Station are the very near by railway stations to Kabamarg. However Jammu Tawi Railway Station is major railway station 243 km near to Kabamarg.
