= Shalwan Pora =

Shalwan Pora Shalwan Pur
- Village
- Location in Jammu and Kashmir, India Shalwan Pora (India)
- Coordinates: 33.7458°N 75.0887°E
- Country: India
- Union territory: Jammu and Kashmir
- District: Anantnag district

Area
  - Total: 119 ha (290 acres)

Population (2011)
  - Total: 1,502
  - Density: 1,260/km^{2} (3,270/sq mi)

Languages
  - Official: Kashmiri, Urdu, Hindi, Dogri, English
- Time zone: UTC+5:30 (IST)
- PIN: 192101

Shalwan Pora or Shalwan Pur is a village in Anantnag tehsil in Anantnag district in Jammu and Kashmir, India.

== Demographics ==
The location code or village code of Shalwan Pora village is 003711. Shalwan Pora village is located in Anantnag Tehsil of Anantnag district in Jammu & Kashmir, India. It is situated 5 kilometres (3.1 mi) away from Anantnag, which is both district & sub-district headquarter of Shalwan Pora village.

According to the 2011 Census of India, there are 202 individual homes in the village with a total population of 1,502.

== Transport ==
=== By Rail ===
Sadura Railway Station and Anantnag Railway Station are the very near by railway stations to Shalwan Pora. However Jammu Tawi railway station is major railway station 243 km (151 mi) near to Shalwan Pora.
