= Isoo =

- Village
- Location in Jammu and Kashmir, India Isoo (India)
- Coordinates: 33.7458°N 75.0887°E
- Country: India
- State: Jammu and Kashmir
- District: Anantnag district

Area
  - Total: 119 ha (290 acres)

Population (2011)
  - Total: 1,502
  - Density: 1,260/km^{2} (3,270/sq mi)

Languages
  - Official: Kashmiri, Urdu, Hindi, Dogri, English
- Time zone: UTC+5:30 (IST)
- PIN: 192101

Isoo is a village in Anantnag tehsils in Anantnag district in Jammu and Kashmir, India.

== Demographics ==
Isoo village is located in Anantnag Tehsil of Anantnag district in Jammu & Kashmir. It is situated 17 km away from Anantnag, which is district headquarter of Isoo village.

The total geographical area of village is 119.8 hectares. Isoo has a total population of 1,955 peoples. There are about 301 houses in Isoo village. Achabal is nearest town to Isoo which is approximately 6 km away.

== Transport ==
=== By Rail ===
Sadura Railway Station & Anantnag Railway Station are the very near by railway stations to Isoo. However ever Jammu Tawi Railway Station is major railway station 243 km near to Isoo.
