= Sadura =

Village in Jammu and Kashmir, India

Sadura Sadur
- Location in Jammu and Kashmir Sadura (India)
- Coordinates: 33.667966°N 75.143514°E
- Country: India
- Union Territory: Jammu and Kashmir

Government
  - Body: Government of Jammu and Kashmir

Languages
  - Official: Kashmiri, Urdu, Hindi, Dogri, English
- Time zone: UTC+5:30 (IST)
- Vehicle registration: JK03

Sadura is a village located in Anantnag district in the Indian administered union territory of Jammu and Kashmir. It has a railway station which lies on Banihal-Anantnag railway line.

== Occupation ==
Most of the people of Sadura are associated with the Walnut business. Agriculture production is significantly low as most part of its cultivable land came under railways. Apple gardens are also a source of income.

== Education ==
Sadura has a literacy rate of more than 80%. There are three schools, namely Salfia Muslim Institute, Aziz Memorial Institute, Leads Institute of Virtual Education, Government Primary School, Government Girls Primary School and one Government High school.

== Transport ==
People have at least 90% of their transport here is also public transporters which carries different routes like from Sadura to Anantnag Sadura to Larkipora Sadura to Vessu Sadura to railway station Sadura for patient there is Ambulance donated for public by S B Mall sadura which runs free of cost for every on for 7/24. Sadura has one Railway Station which connects Sadura with Srinagar, Baramulla and Banihal.

=== By Rail and Road ===
Sadura Railway Station and Anantnag Railway Station are the nearby railway stations to Sadura. However Jammu Tawi is major railway station, 243 km (151 mi) near to Sadura. Sadura is 5 km (3.1 mi) away from main town Anantnag, it just takes 15 minutes drive from Anantnag to reach Sadura. Commercial vehicle can be boarded near Janglat Mandi to reach Sadura via Kamad, other ways to reach is to board bus at KMD Anantnag and depart at Vessu. Another way is take Train from Anantnag and Depart at Sadura.

== See also ==
- Akingam
- Achabal
- Kokernag
