= Rasul Mir =

19th Century Kashmiri poet

Imām-e-Ishqiya Shairi Rasul Mir Shahabadi
- رَسوٗل میٖر شاہ آبادی
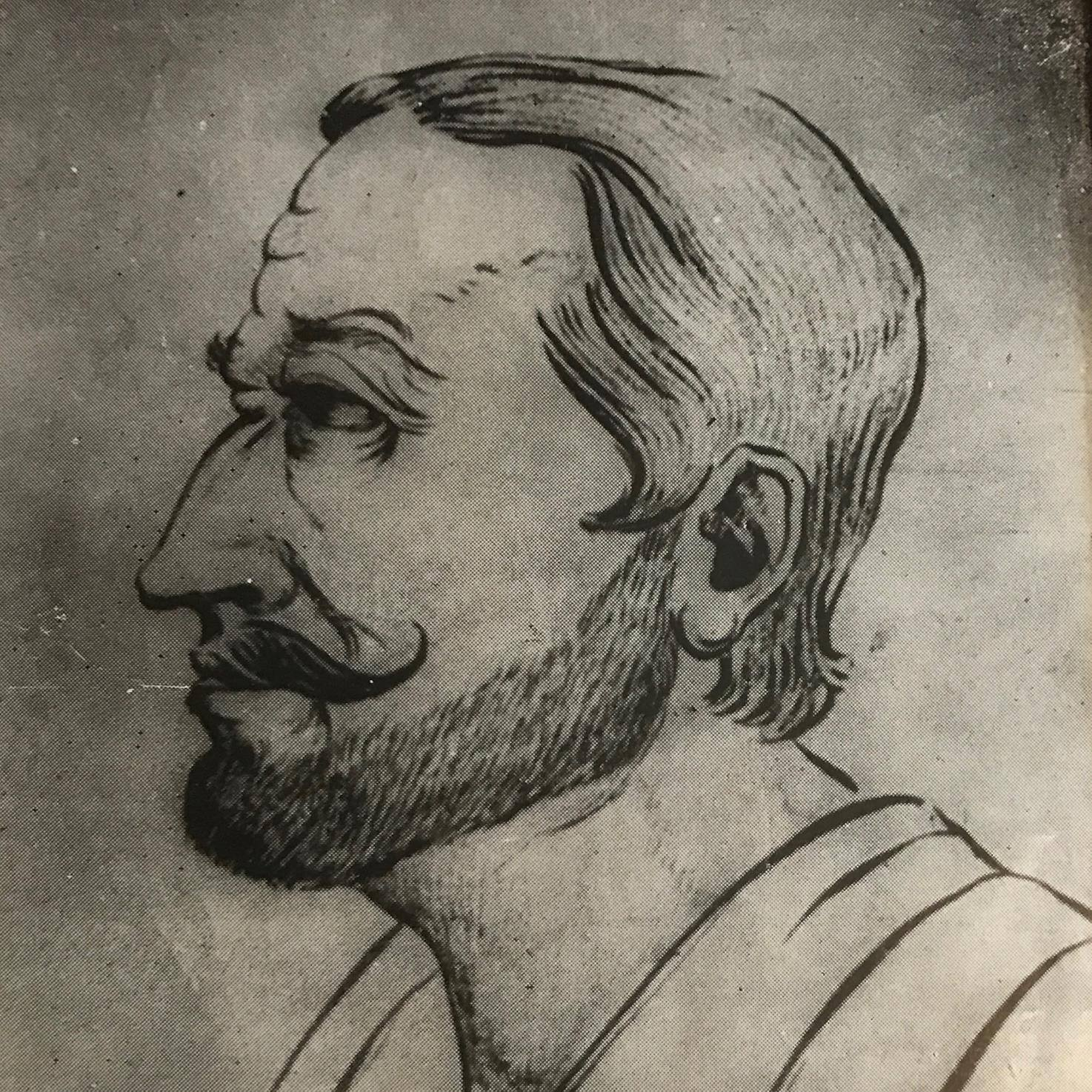
- Rasul Mir on the cover of Sahitya Akademi 1990 edition
- Born: 1840; Dooru Shahabad, Anantnag, Kashmir
- Died: 1870 (aged 29–30)
- Resting place: Khanqah Faiz Panah(shrine of Amir-i-Kabir), Dooru Shahabad, Anantnag, Kashmir
- Education: Persian literature
- Occupations: Poet, Muqdam
- Writing career
- Language: Kashmiri
- Genres: Ghazal, Vatsun, Nazm (Naʽat)
- Notable works: Bal Maraeyo, Baeliye ruthe mai yaar, Chaw mai jami jamai, Lalas vantai chus sawaal, Lo lati lo, Rind posh maal
- Movements: Romanticism, Sufism
- Influences : Muhammad, Hafez, Saadi Shirazi, Bedil, Firdausi, Shah-e-Hamadan, Rumi, Nizami, Attar, Ghani Kashmiri Influenced : Mahjoor, Abdul Ahad Azad, Mohiuddin Hajni, G.N Firaq, Fazil Kashmiri, Zarif Ahmad Zarif, Rahman Rahi, Miskin, Mohammad Taing

Rasul Mir (Kashmiri: رَسوٗل میٖر) also known as Rasul Mir Shahabadi, was a Kashmiri romantic poet born in Doru Shahabad. He is often referred to as Imām-e-Ishqiya Shairi' (The epitome of romantic poetry) for his literary contribution to Kashmiri romanticism. Mir was said to have been alive in around 1855 when Mahmud Gami and Swoch Kral died. He died a few years before Maqbool Shah Kralawari. Though, Muhammad Y. Taing, in his book کلیاتِ رسول میر (Kulliyat-e-Rasul Mir) mentions of a document from Revenue Department, dated 5 April 1889, acknowledging Rasul Mir as a muqdam (village chieftain, in accord to the agrarian system of Kashmir).

He is a Kashmiri poet, often referred to by local scholars as the John Keats of Kashmir. He formally inaugurated Gazal to Kashmiri poetry.

== Early life ==
=== Background ===
Rasul Mir was born in Dooru Shahabad, an administrative unit in Anantnag district of Kashmir. The only thing certain about his early life is the name of the place and the era he lived in. His year of birth and death, remains a debatable subject. According to oral traditions, the poet lived in Mirmaidan area of Dooru or in a house adjacent to Khanqah Faiz Panah, a mosque constructed by Mir Mohammad Hamadani, the son of Mir Sayyid Ali Hamadani. The house has since been demolished, and a vegetative garden can be found in its place there. It is widely believed that he had attended a local traditional makhtab (an academy), where he was introduced to the Persian language. He descended from a family of zamindars (landowners), who used to be the village heads in Mir Maidan at Dooru. Oral traditions describe his appearance as typically wearing a turban and maintaining a long moustache.

The poet's well known contemporary Mahmud Gami was also a native of Doru Shahabad. Gami was much older than Rasul Mir. The first attempts at scripting the ghazal form in Kashmiri have been revered to him but literary critics note stylistic differences compared to the structure later established by Mir. In Mahmud Gami and Rasul Mir's legacy, two parks and a cultural library namely Mahmud Gami Rasul Mir Bazm-e-Adab have been inaugurated as a token for these poets.

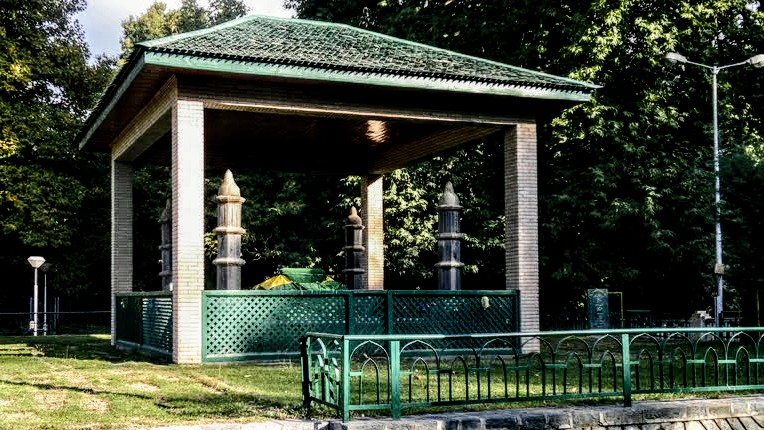
Mausoleum of Mahmud Gami at Doru Shahabad

The Mughal Garden at Acchabal, the deep woods of Kokar Nag and Vernag Lake, are not far from the place where Rasul Mir lived. The poet, with his romantic bend of mind, must have been influenced by the abundance of natural beauty all around him. He was often seen mentioning the name of these picturesque places in several of his poems. Rasul Mir's life spans the reigns of three different sets of rulers in Kashmir - Afghan, Sikh and Dogra empire. He was born during the later years of Sikh rule over Kashmir. The Afghan rule had begun in the year 1752 lasting till 1819 with the Sikh conquest of Kashmir in the Shupian Battle. Of the three sets of rulers, the Afghans were the worst. Their rule over Kashmir had begun immediately after the second Great famine of 1748- following the Great famine of 1723. Their rule was a period of relentless persecution, ruthless economic exploitation of the masses and, politically, a period of continuous instability. Though, in his adolescent-youthful days, the poet has mentioned Kandahar, the former capital of the Afghan Empire, in his love-longing lullaby Bal Maraeyo:

Sharmandà kärthas āftābo
Qandhārich zūn
Käji chāni gäjisäy
läjisày daräy
Bāl màräyo

Translation:

I, the full moon of Qandahar’, am ashamed
Of your brilliance, my sun.
Waiting, wilting in your remembrance,
I will wither away young.

As Lawrence suggests, the Sikh rule, though mild in degree, was no better than the Afghan rule. The first ruler of the Sikh empire, Ranjit Singh, had banned Azaan (the Islamic call for prayer) and the gathering of Muslims in Jama Masjid, Srinagar for 21 years. The Sikhs enacted a number of anti-Muslim laws, which included handing out death sentences for cow slaughter too. The Sikhs ruled for twenty-seven years- the years of Rasul Mir's youth and manhood.

The above reference from this poem could be felt as an expression of departing away from the Beloved (or the Shahid, pious self).

While some are of opinion he was referring to the famous Kashmiri poet Habba Khatoon, "whose name was Zun, the Kashmiri word for the moon. She was born in Chandrahar village" says K. N Dhar while quoting Mahjoor.

It was also during the Sikh rule in 1831 that Kashmir experienced another great famine. Godfrey Vigne, who visited the valley in 1835 after the great famine, writes:

The villages were fallen in decay. The rich-ground was uncultivated for want of labour and irrigation. Shupian was a miserable place, and Islamabad was but a shadow of its former self

The Sikh rule ended in 1846 when, under the Treaty of Amritsar, Kashmir was handed over by the British to the Dogra ruler, Gulab Singh, in return of seventy-five lakh (7.5 million) Nanakshahee rupees and some political concessions. With the accession of Dogras to the throne of Kashmir there was, however, a change for the better. Though, the fourth-time, valley had to approach another Great famine in 1877, wiping or migrating out 30–40% of the population.

It was in a milieu like this that Rasul Mir spent his life. He must have seen the worst prevailing tyranny and exploitation as he belonged to the countryside, where the rule of law seldom prevailed. Mir was himself a muqdam (village chieftain), he must have sometimes acted as a convenient instrument of all-pervasive tyranny and exploitation but, what is surprising, his poetry shows little or no trace of the surroundings in which he lived. Though, Rasul Mir was fond of wandering around and visiting different places. Almost every year, he would take a trip to Pogul Paristan, Ramban and return after long intervals to live at the place to which he returns again and again with tenderness and affection is his native area- Dooru, Shahabad. The geographical features of the valley, such as the springs of Verinag and local gardens, heavily influenced the imagery in Rasul Mir's poetry. The famous stone carrying its name was also quarried there. The Persian translator of Rajatarangini, Mulla Muhammad, who had translated Rajatarangini in Persian, entitled Behr-ul-Asmar, (or the sea of tales), at the behest of Sultan Zain-ul-Abidin (1421–1472) A.D of Kashmir, was from Dooru, Shahabad. The colonial Indian-Pakistani writer Saadat Hasan Manto's family had also originated from Dooru, Shahabad.

=== Poetic tradition ===
The tradition to which Rasul Mir belongs is quite a complex one. Essentially rooted in folklore and folk sensibility, the tradition has been widened and enriched by influences from diverse sources; particularly Persian poetry. From this point of view the most remarkable Persian poets are Sadi, Hafez, Nizami, Rumi, Attar, Firdausi, Bedil and Ghani Kashmiri. Sadi's works - Gulistan, Bostaan and Pandnamah (popularly known as Karima)- constituted the first formal syllabus of conventional education in Kashmir, besides the religious texts. This was the education that Rasul Mir had in his childhood and boyhood.

Rasul Mir's poetry is something that is to be sung not read. Primarily a singer, Mir led a singing party, moving from place to place and singing chakhri and rouf (wanwun), the most popular form of singing during Rasul Mir's day and continued to retain some of its popularity till the beginning of insurgency in 1987 following Kashmir conflict. Another form of communal singing prevalent in Kashmir was nende baeth (songs sung while de-weeding paddy fields). Such communal singing was a common feature of 19th century Kashmir. Every village had one or more such singing companies. The aesthetic underlying this kind of poetry suited the feudal ethos. The singing companies would usually sing during the night in large gatherings. The social value of these musical concerts was to wash away care and anxiety from laden hearts through nights of singing and revelry. Rasul Mir is always alive to the musical possibilities of language and exploits them to the maximum. Most of his songs were composed for occasions of singing and would surely have been different if written with some different purpose. His poems, "Dil hai nyunam tsuri lo lo", "Chaw mai jami jamai", "Kout goum" and "Rind posh maal" are metrically what they are because they were written for certain occasion of singing.

In his poetry he also repeatedly refers to the places which he would often visit- Achhabal, Khannabal, Mattan, Nishat-Shalimar, Sona Lank- to name only few.

== Personal life ==
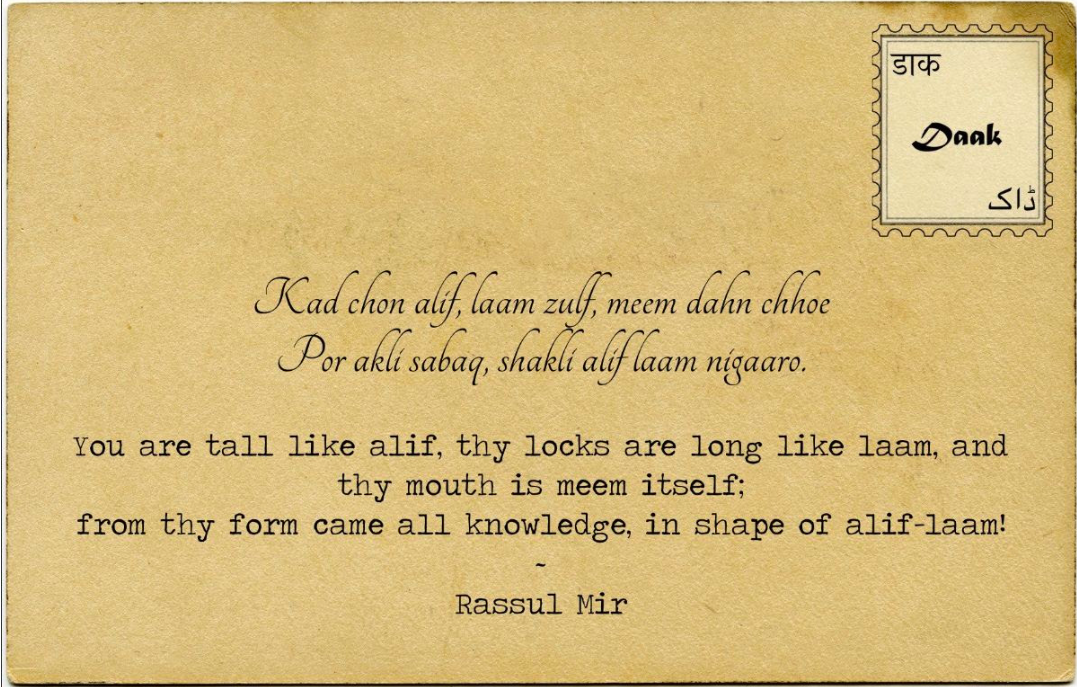
Rasul Mir expressing his abode of love

It is a speculation that Rasul Mir was in love with a Brahmin girl named Kwong who belonged to a Hindu landlord family in Dooru being his real spring of love and endless ghazals for her made Rasul Mir what he is known for today, he was a romantic at heart and intensity of his love was divine and almost monotheistic. He died without being married.

Local narratives often describe Kwong as a central muse for Mir's romantic poetry. It is a speculation, that the poet would also visit places such as Tashawan, Srinagar (The province known for prostitution in Mir's day). These insights are supported by the internal evidence supplied by his poetry where he is morbidity pre-occupied with the contours of a female body and, almost in every poem, refers to the sensitive parts of a woman's body so vividly that the effect is often aphrodisiac. Somewhere these heady portraits of the lover and beloved mingle into one whole. 'The Kashmiri Gazal', says Abdul Ahad Azad, is a female seeking the lover, who is male. In Persian, from where 'Kashmiri gazal' derives its inspiration, the object of love is a male sought by a male singer. In Rasul Mir's persuasion, the singer changes from woman to man, the poems, and the elements of female beauty get mixed with distinctly male attributes producing a bivalent image. Azad calls it a 'defect of conception'. This defected concept, runs in the Kashmiri gazals from Mahmood Gami to Mahjoor. It certainly mars a distinctive characteristic of Kashmiri gazals, that set it apart from Persian and its offspring Urdu gazal. This trait has been preserved in female poets alone, like Habba Khatoon and Arnimaal where there could be no confusion. Rasul also gets into the gazal a boldness that is characteristically masculine. A male poet, to be successful in this form, would always have to maintain such a pose may be easier in a dramatic work but is essentially difficult in lyrical form, like the vatsun, which, in essence, is the expression of the author's personality. Rasul Mir was aware of the artistic implications of this problem and tried to effect a bold and revolutionary change by altering the sex of the speaking voice from female to male in most of his lyrics. This lent a note of realism and authenticity to his poetry and made it appear more natural as the speaking voice was freed from the fetters of an artificial pose. That is Rasul Mir – bold, beautiful poet of exquisite love, singer of fervent lyrics. The breath of vibrant air, that sent its freshness over cobwebs of cloistered verses. Almost single-handedly, he turned Kashmiri poetry into a bubbling love, gushing forth helplessly, sincerely, fervently, as it should in a vale of beauty.

== Notable works ==
Mir emphasised romance in his poems, and delved less on Tasavvuf (mysticism). He had turned his back on mysticism as he was not a mystic but whatever he wrote was something pure and straight from his heart. His language does not give the impression of flaunting a foreign medium, which was in his time considered the language of culture. His genius lay in acclimatising Persian words and phrases so that the reader does not get an impression that he is being served a foreign fare. He confined himself to the theme of human love- not on the exalted platonic plane but on the human level. He was sensuous, uninhabited and lavish. His expression is passionate and spontaneous, with the added asset of melody and rhyme.

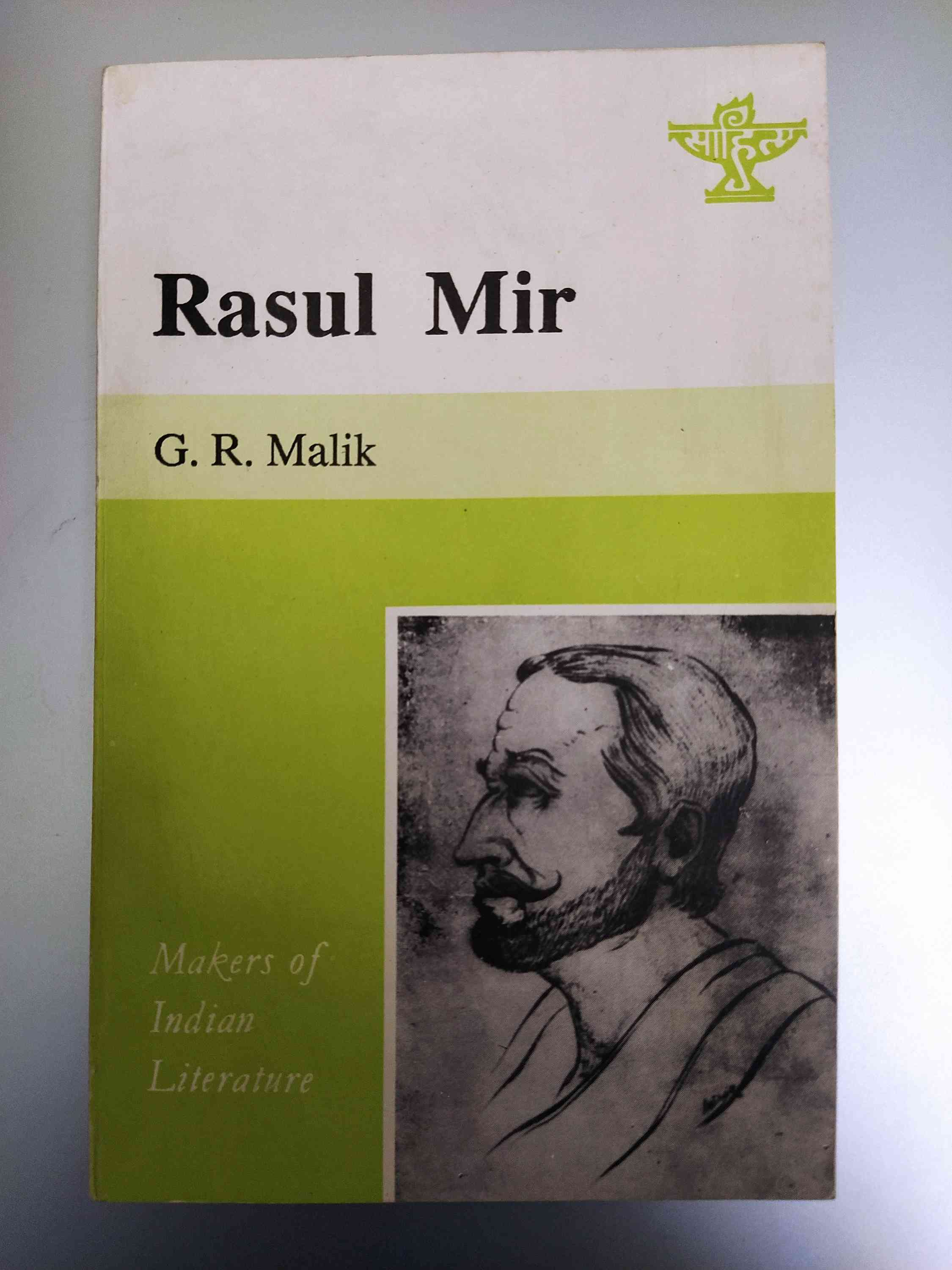
Rasul Mir by G.R Malik 1990 edition

The Kalaam (poetic works) of Rasul Mir is limited to seventy-nine poems or Baeths (a Kashmiri lyrical ballad), including a ghazal in Persian. Of the seventy-nine poems, the authorship of four is doubtful. In Taing's standard edition, these are those poems entitled, "Nar lalawun thovnam moori lo lo", "Karinam gray kot goum", "Suy goum travith bal bave kasty" and "Gatte mye mar sone kane doorani". The solitary ghazal in Persian is just an occasional amateurish exercise and has no special merit. Rasul Mir's poetic method and stature is, therefore, to be judged by the remaining seventy-five poems. Genre-wise, these poems, apart from one about the death of Muhammad, consist of vatsun and ghazal forms of Kashmiri lyric. There is mention too, of native myths, like Kashmir's famed fable, Himal and Nagrai, in his poems, including the legend of Yusuf and Zulaikha. Even though, with some limited works, he has already been embodied in the integral Kashmiri oral tradition. His notable works include Rind poshmal, Bal maraeyo, Gaste wesiye, Baeliye ruthai mea yaar, Lo lati lo, and Ashkh Tsuro.

=== Literary controversy ===
There are a lot of speculations regarding Rasul Mir writing a Mathnavi based on the love story of Zeba and Nigar, which is exclusively credited to Miskin. Prof. G.R Malik in his monograph on Rasul Mir, contests the authenticity of Zeba and Nigar being written by Rasul Mir.

== Death ==
He wrote:

Rasul, even though you are infamous for your love of 'tulip-lips', be happy, for seldom do the lovers complain of thy in-attention

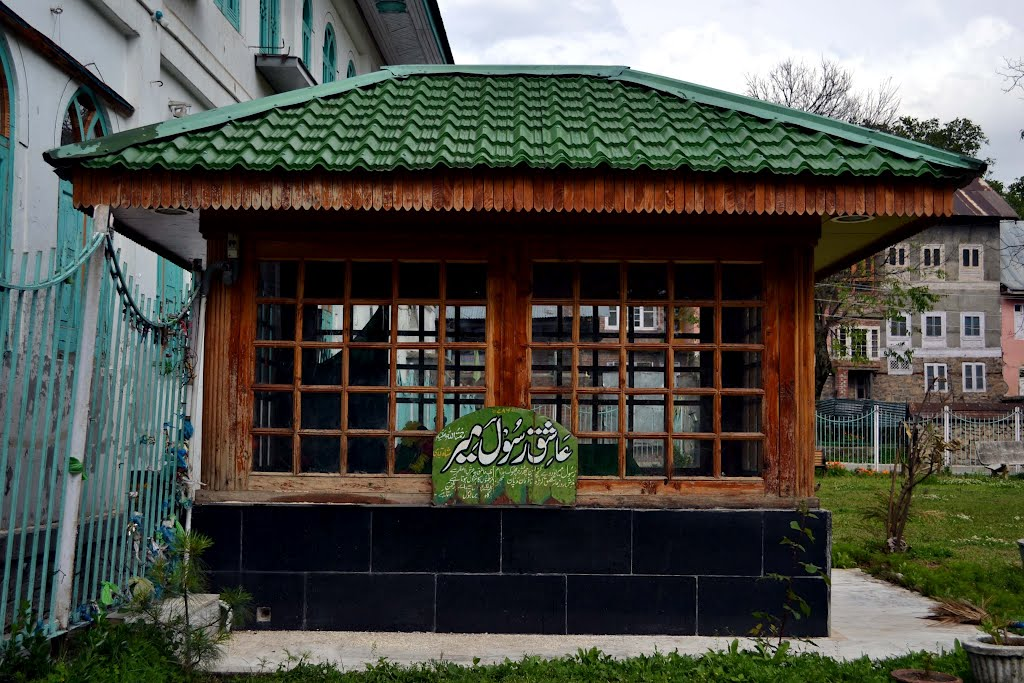
Gravesite of Rasul Mir (south to the third window of Faiz Panah) at Dooru

Rasul Mir's later life, however, seems to have been quite sober and serene. He became a disciple of a murshid (spiritual guide), Sheikh Ahmad Tarabali and, according to a report, had another murshid at Tral. It was during these days he tried to dabble in mystic poetry which was not, by any sketch of imagination, his forte, and wrote a poem on the death of Muhammad. In his later life, the poet was often seen sitting alone, as if in an intoxicated state, near the Vernag Spring, absorbed in his own thoughts with moonlight shimmering on its blue waters.

It is said that during the last days of his life, he sat at the south window on the ground floor of the khanqah and spent his time in solitude. He famously wished to be buried under the same window.

Including others, the following verse has been inscribed on his gravestone:

Rasul chhuy zainith deen te mazhab,

rokh te zulf chon,

kav zaini kya gov,

kufur te Islaam nigaro?

Translation:

Rasul has conquered religion and faith,

your face and your tresses.

What does he know about

Blasphemy and Islam, my love?

== In pop culture ==
Renowned Kashmiri revolutionary poet- Mahjoor was significantly influenced by Rasul Mir. He spoke of himself as the reincarnation of him:

Ath darda sozas parda tulith gav su Rasul Mir
Mahjoor laegith aav beyi dubaar

Translation:

Rasul Mir unveiled the bewitching face of love and compassion
And was reborn in the form of Mahjoor

Prominent Kashmiri artists - Shameema Dev Azad, Abdul Rashid Hafiz, Gulzar Ahmad Mir, Yawar Abdal, Tanveer Ali, Abhay Sopori, Funkaar Noor Mohammad, and many others have composed songs rendering poetry of Rasul Mir.

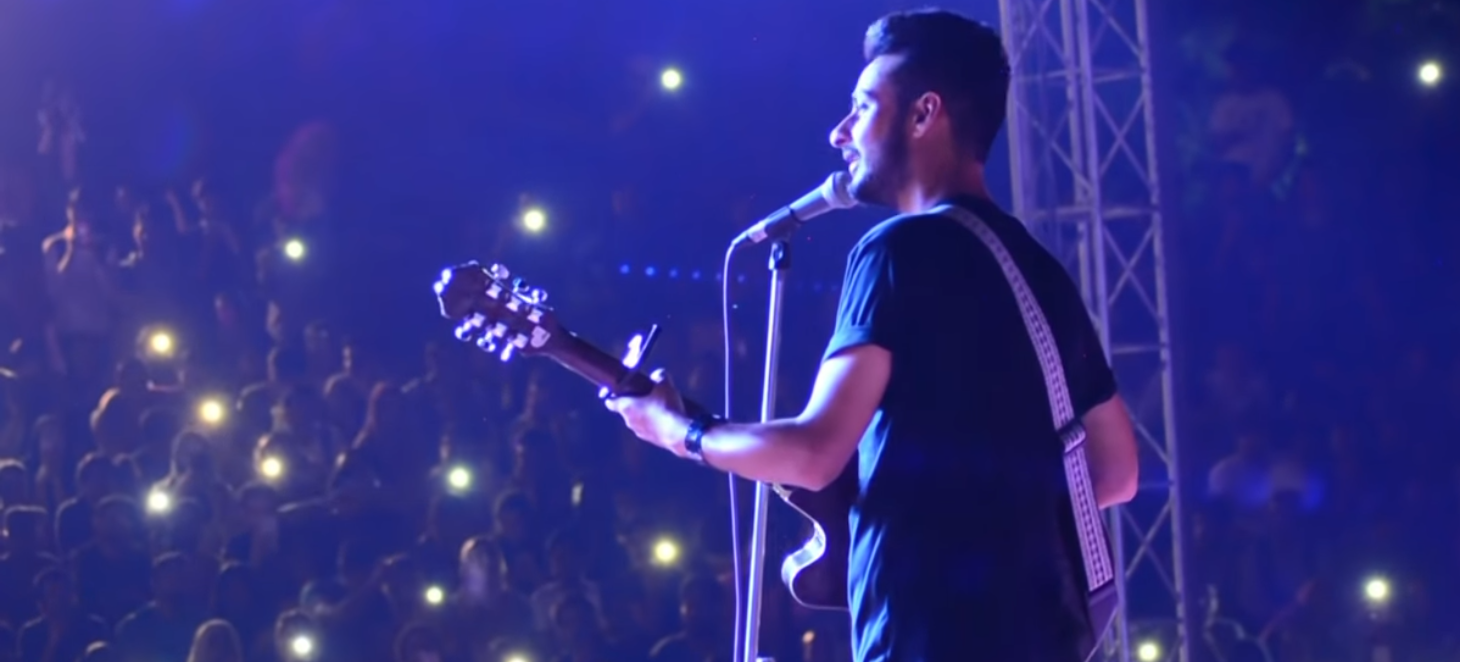
Yawar Abdal performing 'Bal Maraeyo' live at Jamia Millia Islamia, Delhi

Legendary Indian singer Asha Bhosle recorded a song by Rasul Mir for Radio Kashmir, Srinagar in the summer of 1966.

Amongst others- Academian, Poet, Director Radio Kashmir, Srinagar and DD Srinagar; Ashraf Sahil was also profoundly influenced by Rasul Mir.

In remembrance of the late poet, Verinag Development Authority and Cultural Academy would observe Rasul Mir's Day in the month of July, but as of 2015 the event has seen to be losing attention from any former authority.

A park near the khanqah has also been named after the poet by the Verinag Development Authority.

== Bibliography ==
- Kulliyat-i-Rasul Mir (1960, 1984, 1997), Muhammad Yousuf Taing
- Rasul Mir by G.R Malik (1990)
- Kalaam-e-Rasul Mir, Ghulam Nabi Aatash
- Aslobiyat (Mehmud Gami ta Rasul Mir), Mohammad Shahban Nurpuri, 1997.
- Rasul Mir: Nadir Sukhan Goe by Nazir Azaad (2011)
- Rasul Mir: The Romantic Poet of Kashmir (2014), Shiban K.Kachru

Essays

- Kashmiri zuban aur shairi, Abdul Ahad Azad
- An Introduction to Kashmiri Romantic Poet-Rasul Mir by Ghulam Nabi Firaq

== Filmography ==
- Director, writer and producer Bashir Budgami filmed a black-and-white documentary drama in 1975, based on the life of Rasul Mir. The film premiered at the Golden Prague International television festival at Prague Czechoslovakia in 1978.
- Director Vidhu Vinod Chopra's film, Mission Kashmir (2000), features the refrain "Rind posh maal gindnay dray lo lo" in the song of the same title.
- Filmmaker Musa Syeed's directorial debut, Valley of Saints (2012), features Rasul Mir's poem "Myon su Dilbar aav nai" in a song named Nightingale's lament; Gulzar Bhat. The film featured at International film festival Rotterdam, and Sundance film festival.
- Actress Shraddha Kapoor recorded the famed folk song "Bal Maraeyo" for Vishal Bhardwaj's part of Shakespearean trilogy, Haider (2014).

== See also ==
- Kashmiri literature
- Mahjoor
- Ghulam Nabi Firaq
