= Shankerpora =

Shankerpora Shankerpur
- Village
- Location within Jammu and Kashmir Location within India
- Coordinates: 33.7458°N 75.0887°E
- Country: India
- State: Jammu and Kashmir
- District: Anantnag district

Area
  - Total: 111 ha (270 acres)

Population (2011)
  - Total: 2,486
  - Density: 2,240/km^{2} (5,800/sq mi)

Languages
  - Official: Kashmiri, Urdu, Hindi, Dogri, English
- PIN: 192211

Shankerpora, also known as Shankerpur, is a village in Anantnag district in the Indian-administered union territory of Jammu and Kashmir.

== Demographics ==
Shanker Pora is a large village located in the tehsil Dooru Shahabad of Anantnag district, Jammu and Kashmir with total 295 families residing. The Shanker Pora village has population of 2,486 of which 1,396 are males while 1 090 are females as per Population Census 2011.

In Shanker Pora village, population of children with age 0-6 is 506 which makes up 20.35% of total population of village. Average Sex Ratio of Shanker Pora village is 781 which is lower than Jammu and Kashmir state average of 889. Child Sex Ratio for the Shanker Pora as per census is 538, lower than Jammu and Kashmir average of 862.

Shanker Pora village has lower literacy rate compared to Jammu and Kashmir. In 2011, literacy rate of Shanker Pora village was 59.95% compared to 67.16% of Jammu and Kashmir. In Shanker Pora Male literacy stands at 65.04% while female literacy rate was 54.00%. Shankerpora is surrounded by Qazigund Tehsil towards west, Achabal Tehsil towards North, Pahloo Tehsil towards North, Banihal Tehsil towards South.

== Transport ==
By rail

Sadura Railway Station and Anantnag Railway Station are the very near by railway stations to Shankerpora. However ever Jammu Tawi Railway Station is major railway station 243 km (151 mi) near to Shankerpora.
