= Chakpath =

Place in Jammu and Kashmir, India

Chakpath is a place in Doru Shahabad tehsil in Anantnag district in the Indian union territory of Jammu and Kashmir. It is one of 62 villages in Doru Shahabad Block along with villages like Shangrin and Shankerpora.

The village is one of the famous villages in Doru Shahbad. It has a big garden having four chenar trees locally known as Char Chinar. Chakpath has an important place in the history of Kashmir. It is said that while on his way to different endeavours the famous ruler Yousuf Shah Chak used to rest under the chenars along with his baes. It is also believed that he named this village after his surname Chak.

== Demographics ==
Kashmiri is the local language here. However most people are comfortable with Urdu as well. Pin Code of Chakpath is 192211 which comes under srinagar postal division (Jammu Kashmir Circle)
