= Thajiwara =

Thajiwara Thajiwoar
- Village
- Location within Jammu and Kashmir
- Coordinates: 33.7458°N 75.0887°E
- Country: India
- State: Jammu and Kashmir
- District: Anantnag district

Area
  - Total: 117 ha (290 acres)

Population (2011)
  - Total: 1,847
  - Density: 1,580/km^{2} (4,090/sq mi)

Languages
  - Official: Kashmiri, Urdu, Hindi, Dogri, English
- Time zone: UTC+5:30 (IST)
- PIN: 192201

Thajiwara or Thajiwoar is a village in South kashmir in the Anantnag district of the Indian union territory of Jammu and Kashmir. It is located on National Highway 244 (NH 244).

== Geography ==
It is 7 km north of District headquarters Anantang, 1.03 km from Achabal and 52 km from the State capital Srinagar. The village covers an area of 117 hectares. The Arpat canal is renowned for trout fishing. Adjacent to the canal is Shah I Handan Stadium. Residents of Thaijwara participate in sports such as cricket, football, and volleyball.

== Demographics ==
In the 2011 census, the population was 1,847 people in 258 houses.

== Culture ==
A shrine of Amir Kabir (RT) and Baba Lasham Reshi (RT) is present in Thajiwara.

== Economy ==
Agriculture and allied services form the backbone of the economy, featuring orchards.

== Education ==
The village has six government aided schools and a private school.

== Transport ==
Sadura Railway Station and Anantnag Railway Station are the nearest railway stations.
