= Sifan, Jammu and Kashmir =

Sifan
- Village
- Location in Jammu and Kashmir, India Sifan (India)
- Coordinates: 33.7458°N 75.0887°E
- Country: India
- State: Jammu and Kashmir
- District: Anantnag district

Area
  - Total: 86.2 ha (213 acres)

Population (2011)
  - Total: 1,438
  - Density: 1,670/km^{2} (4,320/sq mi)

Languages
  - Official: Kashmiri, Urdu, Hindi, Dogri, English
- Time zone: UTC+5:30 (IST)
- PIN: 192101

Sifan is a village in Anantnag tehsil in Anantnag district in Jammu and Kashmir, India.

== Demographics ==
According to Census 2011 information, the location code or village code of Sifan village is 003662. Sifan village is located in Anantnag tehsil of Anantnag district in Jammu and Kashmir, India. It is situated 9 km (5.6 mi) away from Anantnag, which is both district & sub-district headquarter of Sifan village.

The total geographical area of village is 86.2 ha (213 acres). Sifan has a total population of 1,438 peoples. There are about 205 houses in Sifan village. Anantnag is nearest town to Sifan which is approximately 8 km (5.0 mi) away.

== Transport ==
=== By Rail ===
Sadura Railway Station and Anantnag Railway Station are the very near by railway stations to Sifan. However Jammu Tawi railway station is major railway station 243 km (151 mi) near to Sifan.
