= Abdul Ahad Azad =

Kashmiri poet, historian and literary critic (1903–1948)

- Born: Abdul Ahad Dar; 1903; Ranger, Kashmir, Jammu and Kashmir, British India
- Died: 4 April 1948 (aged 44–45); Srinagar, Jammu and Kashmir, Union of India
- Burial place: Ranger, Chadoora
- Citizenship: Jammu and Kashmir (princely state) until 1947; India (1947–1948)
- Education: University of the Punjab
- Occupations: Teacher, poet and historian
- Father: Muhammad Sultan Dar

Abdul Ahad Dar (1903 – 4 April 1948), popularly known as Abdul Ahad Azad, was a Kashmiri poet, historian and literary critic. Born in the Rangar village of Chadoora in Budgam district, Azad is considered to be the first revolutionary poet and is credited with laying the foundations of literary criticism in Kashmiri literature.

Azad's famous works include the three volume book, Kashmiri Zaban aur Sayiri. His famous poems include Dariyav ("River"), Shikwa-i-Kashmir ("Complaint of Kashmir") and Shikwa-i-Iblis ("Complaint of Satan"). His poetry reflect a desire for a better future, emphasizing an egalitarian society based on the principles of equality and pluralism. His writings inspired the political movements of his time, particularly the 1931 resistance. He was an advocate for linguistic nationalism and social change.

== Personal life ==
Azad was born in 1903 to Muhammad Sultan Dar belonging to the Dar tribe of Kashmir. He received his preliminary education in a madrassa, where he was taught Persian, Arabic and Islamic philosophy by his father. Azad passed Munshi Alim exam from University of the Punjab and was appointed by Dogra government as a primary school teacher in Zowhama, where he taught Arabic; he was later transferred to Tral. Azad married a village girl and had a son. In 1931 resistance, he was suspected of being an activist and transferred to farflung areas. His house was raided, searched and family members tortured. His dues were also withheld by the government and he was not permitted to visit his ailing son, who died at the age of four, while he was posted at Tral. Azad thought deeply over this incident and according to Bazzaz he became "a skeptic, a rationalist."

In 1942, at the age of 39, he developed friendships with Prem Nath Bazaz, Padam Nath Ganju, Omkar Nath, Ghulam Ahmad Ashai and KL Kaul. At this point, Azad was ideologically drifting towards radical Marxism. In April 1948, Azad died of appendicitis in Srinagar at the age of 45, amidst the political turmoil in Kashmir.

== Literary work ==
Azad wrote his first poem at the age of 16. He was introduced to the poetry of Habba Khatoon, Rasul Mir and Maqbool Shah by his father. Azad wrote various revolutionary poems and became a source of inspiration for the freedom fighters during the political awakening in Kashmir. Azad composed the first history of Kashmiri language and poetry from Lalleshwari to his time. The three volume book, Kashmiri Zaban aur Sayiri, was edited by Mohammad Yusuf Teng and was posthumously published by Jammu and Kashmir Academy of Art, Culture and Languages in Urdu, in 1959, 1962 and 1963, respectively. Azad initially wrote prose in Urdu but was later inspired to write in Kashmiri after Mahjoor founded the journal, Kong Pos.

Braj Kachru has identified three poetic phases in Azad's poetry, which he asserts, are indicative of his maturity and development. These phases coincide with the pen names Azad adopted throughout his career. The first phase was the poems of love and devotion written under the pen name, Ahad. Poems in this phase were influenced by Urdu and Persian poets. The second phase is characterized by his poetry on nature under the pen name of Janbaz. Prem Nath Bazaz argues that shift happened because Azad drew inspiration from Mahjoor's poetry on nature. The last phase was when he adopted Azad as his pen name, in 1931, at Khanqah-e-Moula, and is known to Kashmiri people by this name. Kachru holds that this change came partly due to the death of his son.

In 1942, Azad became involved in the Kashmiri Socialists' democratic movement for complete freedom of Kashmir. This affiliation provided him with opportunities to study current literature, philosophy, and progressive ideas. This, according to Prem Nath Bazaz, led to the "unfolding of all his latent capacities" and "raising of banner of revolt against the extant social order."

Together with Mahjoor and Zinda Kaul, Azad is considered one of the key figures in the modernist movement in Kashmiri literature. These three poets are recognized for their contribution to shaping the literary landscape that later evolved into a renaissance of Kashmiri literature after 1947.

=== Poetic themes ===
Azad introduced revolutionary themes in Kashmiri poetry. The linguistic innovation required for these new themes was also attempted by him, notably in his poems, Shikwa-i-Iblis, among other. His poetry, influenced by Marxist worldview, expresses a desire for social emancipation by giving voice to the voiceless elements of society. His poetry reveals a devotion to the birth of a new, progressive society in which the structures of exploitation and inequality collapse, as Marx predicted in his philosophy. Azad was the first Kashmiri poet to include new themes like war and religious fanaticism and champion the cause of peace and universal brotherhood. Azad is also credited with infusing Marxist themes in Kashmiri poetry, which is reflected in his poems such as Inqalab ("Revolution"), An Inqalab ("Bring revolution"), and Payami Inqalab ("Message of the revolution").

Moving on from Mahjoor's plain and straightforward patriotism, Azad communicates not only his egalitarian beliefs and strong belief in all-encompassing equality of mankind, but also emphasizes the need for a socialistic, classless, and global human society. As a result, he made a name for himself as the first Kashmiri poet, prominently expressing three different and unifying themes in his poetry: action advocacy, egalitarianism, and social equality.

=== Shikwa-i-Iblis and Dariyav ===
In his famous poem of seventy three verses, Shikwa-i-Iblis ("Complaint of Satan), Azad criticised the existence of God. "I know only blind people believe in your existence," states Satan in the poem. The poem was considered blasphemous by Orthodox Muslims and there were talks of issuing fatwa against him and declaring him apostate. Mahjoor and other advised against such a strategy and urged him to return to conventional paths, but he was not convinced. Instead, he replied:

O men of faith, you have your own diin (religion) and I have mine.
Your sacred object is God and my ideal is man.
Your God is pleased by building temples, mosques, dharamshalas.
My beloved (God) feels delighted in unity, affection and sympathy.

Dariyav ("The River"), another famous poem of Azad was published in The Weekly Vitasta. Prem Nath Bazaz asserts that "very little like this has been composed in Kashmiri." He further argues that the poem "contains the philosophy of life that Azad taught." Kachru states that "restlessness of an anarchist is clearly expressed in the later poetry of Azad, such as his well-known poem Dariyiv." In the poem, the rhythmic motion of the waves symbolizes a call to action and rebellion against the unjust socioeconomic system. Referring to societal inequality, the River sings:

I shall not rest till the world is rid
Of the embankments that divide,
Of ditch and hollow that deform
Its smooth and lovely face.
This passion, like a consuming fire,
Burns me even though I'm water.

== Political views ==
Abdul Ahad Azad endeavored to incite feelings of linguistic nationalism and advocated the restoration of the lost prominence of the Kashmiri language during the 1930s, in his history of Kashmiri language and poetry. His work highlighted importance of revolution in bringing about the social and political change, apart from the empowerment of rural masses. Hafsa Kanjwal, in her book, Colonizing Kashmir: State-building Under Indian Occupation, writes, "he (Azad) identified as a Marxist and his poetry directly addressed themes of social change and justice." Trilokinath Raina asserts that "Azad courageously preached scientific humanism" and that "Azad's ideological commitment was deep." He further asserts that "he remained a radical Marxist throughout his life." Azad had no regard for nationalism and sees it as "jugglery" and a "cause of enimity" between people. He ranks nationalism and communalism on the same level, claiming that neither has the potential to liberate people.

When Sheikh Abdullah was appointed as the head of emergency administration in October 1947, an organisation called Cultural Front was founded, with notable faces such as Mahjoor, Rahi, Nadim, Kamil and Sadiq as its members. Azad too was invited to be its member, but he declined.

== Published works ==
=== Books authored ===
Among his published works are:

- Azad, Abdul Ahad (1959). کشمیری زبان اور شاعری [Kashmiri Language and Poetry] (in Urdu). Vol. 1. Srinagar: Jammu and Kashmir Academy of Art, Culture and Languages.
- Azad, Abdul Ahad (1962). کشمیری زبان اور شاعری [Kashmiri Language and Poetry] (in Urdu). Vol. 2. Srinagar: Jammu and Kashmir Academy of Art, Culture and Languages.
- Azad, Abdul Ahad (1963). کشمیری زبان اور شاعری [Kashmiri Language and Poetry] (in Urdu). Vol. 3. Srinagar: Jammu and Kashmir Academy of Art, Culture and Languages.
- Azad, Abdul Ahad (1966). Nath Ganjoo, Prem (ed.). کلیاتِ آزاد [Collected Works of Azad] (in Urdu). Srinagar: Jammu and Kashmir Academy of Art, Culture and Languages.
- Azad, Abdul Ahad (2023). Aazaad, the Poet of Lool: English Translation of the Major Poems of Abdul Ahad Aazaad. Translated by Bhat, R. L. (2nd ed.). New Delhi Kashmir: Gulshan Books Kashmir. ISBN 978-81-8339-494-9.

=== Books on Azad ===
- Gauhar, G. N. (1997). Abdul Ahad Azad (1st ed.). New Delhi: Sahitya Akademi. ISBN 81-260-0322-7.
