= Naw Wathu =

NOWATHOO ANANTNAG Nowathoo
- Village
- NOWATHOO
- Location in Jammu and Kashmir NOWATHOO ANANTNAG (India)
- Coordinates: 33.7076°N 75.1081°E
- Country: India
- State: Jammu and Kashmir
- Anantnag: Anantnag
- Anantnag: Anantnag

Area
  - Total: 17.8 ha (44 acres)

Population (2011)
  - Total: 412
- Time zone: UTC+05:30 (IST)

Nowathoo (also spelled Nawathoo) is a village in the Anantnag Tehsil of the Anantnag district in the Indian Union Territory of Jammu and Kashmir. It is one of the 105 villages in Anantnag Tehsil and is situated alongside villages such as Monghall, Danter, Lalipora, Malapora, and Furrah. Nowathoo is a small and peaceful village located approximately 2.5 km from Lal Chowk, Anantnag, and about 2–3 km from the main town of Anantnag. The village is known for its beautiful natural surroundings, fresh and calm air, scenic landscapes, melodious bird songs, hospitable people, and a quiet lifestyle that reflects the charm of rural Kashmir. Distances from Nowathoo: Lal Chowk, Anantnag – 2.5 km Khanabal – 3 km Wanpoh – 3 km Mirbazar – 4 km Aloo Stop – 2.5 km Janglat Mandi – 3 km The village enjoys excellent connectivity, with major roads and highways located within 2–3 km, including: National Highway 44 (NH-44) National Highway 244 (NH-244) K.P. Road Its strategic location near Anantnag town and major transportation routes makes Nowathoo a well-connected village while still retaining its peaceful rural character.

== Communication routes ==
The village has access through six routes presently, from North side village route is leading to Hanji danter (1.4 km) and Khanabal (3.5 km), from North-East side road leads to Bangi-nowgham (1.5 km) and Ashajipora Anantnag (2.6 km). From Eastern side Moghall (1.6 km) is the destiny. Coming towards South-East of the Nawathoo newly constructed road leaves for Sangeenpora (2.4 km), Furrah (2.9 km) & Mir-Bazar (4.7 km). The Western road of village is connected with National Hi-way (malpora) (NH44) (2.5 km) and the final route of North-Western side from Nawathoo to Muniward (2.3 km), Harnag (3.8 km) and Railway station Anantnag (4.1 km).

Nawathoo is 3 kilometres (1.9 mi) away from Lal Chowk, Anantnag. It is one of the small villages Anantnag. Nowathoo is divided into two parts.

One part is with hanji danter called nowathoo danter,

And another part is named as nowathoo Anantnag.

The village has road connectivity with all the major parts of Anantnag like khanabal, harnag, wanpoh, junglatmandi, And with national highway 44

And national highway 244

== Demographics ==
The total population was 412 at the 2011 Indian census, comprising 214 males and 198 females in 65 households.

== Latest Survey ==
Nowathoo village is located 3 km away from Anantnag main town, J&K with total 65 families residing. Nowathoo village has population of 325, of which 159 are males while 140 are females as per the latest survey held during observation. In Nowathoo village population of children with age 0-6 is 23 which make 7.07% of total population of village. Nowathoo village has lower literacy rate as compared to Jammu and Kashmir. In 2021, literacy rate of Now

wathoo is 31.43% compared to 85.70% (National Statistical Office) of Jammu & Kashmir. Io Nawathoo Male literacy stands at 38.99% while female literacy rate is 22.85%. As per constitution of India and Panchayati Raj acto Nawathoo village is administrated lumberdar (mukdam) by one Sarpanch and one Panch.

== Literacy ==
Literacy rate (children under age 6 are excluded) of Nawathoo is 31.43%, 38.99% of male and 22.85% of female population is literate here. Overall literacy rate in the village has increased by 10% from 21.85% in 2011 to 31.85% in 2021.

== Agrarian sector ==
The economy of the village is partially based on agriculture. Almost 90% of the village population is dependent on agrarian activities. Therefore, agriculture is the soul of economy. Traditionally rice was the staple food of the people and majority of the population was engaged in the agrarian ventures. The total area covered by the village is approximately 17.8 hectares in which the total irrigated land (aab paash) 278,940 m2 and rest is the un-irrigated land (Gair-aab paash), covered by the wood. The economy was largely agrarian and semi-pastoral. The village was largely self-sufficient as the basic needs of the people were limited and were fulfilled locally. The economy of the village was a sort of closed economy. The production and consumption of goods was limited to the locality.

Kashmiri is the main local language. People also speak Urdu and Hindi.
