= Magri Pora =

Village in Anantnag, India

Magri Pora Mageir Pur
- Village
- Location in Jammu and Kashmir, India Magri Pora (India)
- Coordinates: 34.3387°N 74.5390°E
- Country: India
- State: Jammu and Kashmir
- District: Anantnag district

Area
  - Total: 76.9 ha (190 acres)
- Elevation: 1,639 m (5,377 ft)

Population (2011)
  - Total: 3,398
  - Density: 4,420/km^{2} (11,400/sq mi)

Languages
  - Official: Kashmiri, Urdu, Hindi, Dogri, English
- Time zone: UTC+5:30 (IST)
- PIN: 192201
- Census code: 003678

Magri Pora or Mageir Pur is a village in Anantnag tehsil of Anantnag district in the Kashmir Valley of Jammu and Kashmir, India. Magri Pora is situated 8 km away from the city of Anantnag.

== Demographics ==
According to the 2011 Census of India, Hardu Toru village has a total population of 1,725 people including 882 males and 843 females; and has a literacy rate of 53.97%.

Population	Total	Male	Female
Total Population	1,725	882	843
Literate Population	931	559	372
Illiterate Population	794	323	471
