= Imoh =

Imoh is a village in the Anantnag district of the Indian union territory of Jammu and Kashmir, located at ca. 8 km from the district capital of Anantnag. It has 2,777 inhabitants in 473 families. The literacy rate is 63.96%.
