= GPCA =

GPCA may refer to:

- General Purpose of California, a product development firm in the United States
- Government Polytechnic College Anantnag, Anantnag, Jammu and Kashmir, India
- Great Plains College Association, a college athletic conference that operated from 1963 to 1965
- Green Party of California, a California affiliate of the Green Party of the United States
- Gulf Petrochemicals and Chemicals Association, represents the downstream hydrocarbon industry in the Arab states of the Persian Gulf
- Generalized Principal Component Analysis; see René Vidal (engineer)
