= Rohu, Jammu and Kashmir =

Rohu Roh Ruhoo
- Village
- Location in India Rohu (India)
- Coordinates: 33.712°N 75.142°E
- Country: India
- Union Territory: Jammu and Kashmir

Languages
  - Official: Kashmiri, Urdu, Hindi, Dogri, English
- Time zone: UTC+5:30 (IST)

Rohu or Roh (also spelled as Ruhoo) is situated in Anantnag tehsil and located in Anantnag district in the Indian union territory of Jammu and Kashmir.

Ruhoo is situated on Ashajipora-Mir Bazar Link road. The adjacent villages to Ruhoo are Bona Checheripora (From South), Monghall (From West), Bhagi Nowgam (From North) and Papyi Bal (From East). River Bringi also come from Bona Checheripora side and separates Ruhoo from Monghall to its west. There are total four Masjids in Ruhoo and one famous Islamic Institute namely BAITUL HUDA of Jamiat Ahlihadith Jammu and Kashmir Bar Bar Shah Srinagar. Most of people are dependent on agriculture and business.
