= Mulsoo =

Mulsoo or Mulus is a village located in Anantnag Tehsil of Anantnag district in Jammu and Kashmir, India. A village which consists of around seven+ ponds of fresh water which are usually moderate hot in winters and cold in summers.
