= Shangrin =

Village in Jammu and Kashmir, India

Shangrin is a village in Doru Shahabad tehsil in Anantnag district in the Indian union territory of Jammu and Kashmir. It is one of 62 villages in Doru Shahabad block, along with villages like Gund Now Roze and Chakpath.

== Demographics ==
Kashmiri is the local language here. People also speak Urdu and Hindi. It has a population of 1751 as per 2011 census. It PIN code is 192211.
