= Kanganhal =

Coordinates: 33°42′N 75°13′E

Kanganhal is a village located in Anantnag Tehsil of Anantnag district in Jammu and Kashmir, India.
