= Lok bawan =

Lok Bawan is a village in Doru Tehsil in Anantnag district in the Indian union territory of Jammu and Kashmir. It is one of 62 villages in Doru block along with villages like Panzat Wan, Pora and Bronthnu.

== Cultural Heritage ==
The village of Lok Bawan is famous for its temple, which is the destination of the Lok Bawan pilgrimage.
