= Mohammad Yousuf Taing =

Indian writer

Mohammad Yousuf Taing (born 1935 in Shopian, India), also known as M. Y. Taing, is a researcher, scholar, critic, writer, politician and historian. He is also biographer of Sheikh Abdullah. He is a prolific literary thinker writing in three Indian languages.

Previously served as secretary to Jammu and Kashmir Academy of Art, Culture and Languages, member of Jammu and Kashmir Public Service Commission, director of Archives, Archaeology and Museums, he is currently serving patron of Jammu and Kashmir Centre for Creative Arts (JKCCA), in office since 2021.

He also served as member of Jammu and Kashmir Legislative Council (MLC) twice from the National Conference and deputy chairman of Jammu and Kashmir Legislative Council.

== Early years ==
Taing was born at Shopian, in Kashmir in 1935. The traditional occupation of his family was fruit trading. He had his early schooling in his hometown and later went on to graduate from the University of Kashmir. Then, he joined the weekly journal Jahani Nav, published from Srinagar, as its editor. This was the beginning of his journalistic career. Later he was to work on the editorial side of the weekly Aaina, in close collaboration with its editor Shamim Ahmed Shamim. He also worked for other newspapers in Srinagar such as Aftab, Zamindar, Haqeeqat and Chattan.

== Career ==
Taing joined the Department of Information for the Jammu and Kashmir Government as the Assistant Editor of its monthly publication 'Tameer', and he took over as editor of the journal. It was during his stewardship of Temeer between 1958 and 1960 that it assumed notable status as a literary journal devoted to Kashmiri language and literature. He assumed editorial duties of the Urdu bi-monthly Sheeraza, an organ of the Jammu and Kashmir Academy of Art, Culture and Languages, in 1962. This began a long association with the organization, which he came to head as Secretary in 1973. He continued to head this body until 1993. During his tenure, the Academy rendered yeoman's service for the promotion of languages and literature of the state, as well as the encouragement of research. Taing has also worked as the Director of Information, Cultural Adviser, Chief Minister, and Director General of Culture, all for the Jammu and Kashmir Government.

== Publications ==
He has published four critical works in Kashmiri, Urdu and English, and edited more than a dozen books on literary subjects. In addition to this, he has written numerous research papers and contributed to literary and cultural treaties.

A collection of Taing's Kashmiri writings was published in 1988 under the title 'Talash'. This was followed by a collection of his Urdu writings under the title Shinakht. His critically acclaimed work Mahjoor Shinasi (criticism) won him the Sahitya Akademi Award in 1998. This work comprises fourteen articles on the life and works of Ghulam Ahmad Mahjoor, the harbinger of modernism in Kashmiri poetry. This work, which comprehensively evaluates the poetry of the Kashmiri poet, takes full advantage of the methods and principles of historical and biographical criticism and discusses the intrinsic literary worth of Mehjoor as well as his influence on modern Kashmiri poetry.

Taing has traveled extensively within and outside the country. He has visited Pakistan, United States, former USSR and Guyana as a member of literary delegations, he is the very first living literary figure of Kashmiri language in whose Honour a private literary organization has published a full-fledged Special Number of its magazine. He was the sole amanuensis of the late Sheikh Mohammad Abdullah's autobiography entitled 'Aatish-e-Chinar' which won the Sahitya Akademi Award. He has compiled and edited several other books with critical annotations and well-researched introductions. These include Kashmiri Zaban Aur Shairi (in three volumes), Heemal, Gulrez, Waliullah Mattoo Kuliyat-e-Maqbook, Kuliyat-e-Rasul Mir, Kashmir Mein Urdu, Kuliyat-e-Mahjoor, Parbat Aur Panghat and Yi Chhu Son Watan.

== Awards ==
Recognizing his contribution to literature and education, the President of India honoured Taing with the Padma Shri on Republic Day in 2008.

Taing also won the Sahitya Akademi Award and the Best Book Prize from Jammu and Kashmir Academy of Art, Culture and Languages in 1994. Other accolades include the Robe of Honour and Silver Plaque from the President of Auqafi Islamia in 1986 and the Robe of Honour from Adabi Markaz Kaamraz in 1998. The J&K Academy of Art, Culture and Languages also conferred on him its robe of Honour in 1999 and made a documentary film on him.

He was nominated in 1999 to the Jammu and Kashmir Legislative Council to represent art and culture. He has been the Chief Patron of Gurjar Desh Trust Jammu for the language journal "Awaz-e-Gurjar" for the last 15 years.

== Books ==
In Kashmiri

- Tlash 1988 (Criticism)
- Kulyat-e-Mahjoor, 1982 (Edited)
- Kulyat-e-Rasul Mir, 1984, 1997 (Edited)
- Maqbool Shah Kralwari (2 volumes) 1972, 1978 (Edited)
- Mahjoor Shinasi, 1993 (Criticism)
- Rash, 2001 (Research)
- Shesh Rang Research and Criticism, 2005
- Ranga Devay, 2007
- Kashir Kitab History – Heritage – 2008

In Urdu

- Shinakht, 1987 (Criticism)
- Kashmiri Zaban aur Shairi, 3 volumes (Edited)
- Kashmir Mein Urdu, 3 volumes (Edited)
- Jesta Jesta (Research) 2001
- Kashmir Qalam, 2010

In English

- Yusuf Shah Chak 1980 (Research)
- Nehru in Kashmir 2012

In Persian

- Himal-Nagrai

== See also ==
- List of Sahitya Akademi Award winners for Kashmiri
