= Sifan =

Sifan could refer to:

- Sifan, Jammu and Kashmir, a village in the disputed territory of Jammu and Kashmir
- Sifan Hassan (born 1993), an Ethiopian-Dutch long-distance runner
- Mohamed Sifan (born 1983), a Maldivian football player
- Sifan Square, in Lijiang, Yunnan, China
