= Government College for Women, Anantnag =

College in Anantnag, J&K

- Type: Public women's college
- Established: March 1979
- Location: Anantnag, Jammu and Kashmir, India; 33°43′48″N 75°09′00″E
- Campus: Urban
- Website: wca.edu.in

The Government College for Women, Anantnag, is a college in Jammu and Kashmir (J&K) state under Indian governance. It was established in 1979 as an intermediate college in the heart of Anantnag town.

== degrees ==
- The college offers various undergraduate courses ranging from Arts, Science, to Humanities. Here is the list of Undergraduate Courses offered by the college.
  1. Bachelor of Commerce (BCOM)
  2. Bachelor of Computer Application (BCA)
  3. Bachelor of Science Medical (BSC)
  4. Bachelor of Science Non-Medical (BSC)
  5. Bachelor of Arts (BA)

== Our Departments ==
- Department Of Koshur
- Department Of Computer Science
- Department Of Home Science
- Department Of Botany
- Department Of Zoology
- Department Of Physics
- Department Of Chemistry
- Department Of Commerce
- Department Of Sericulture
- Department Of Education
- Department Of Economics
- Department Of History
- Department Of Political Science
- Tour and Travel
- Department Of Persian
- Department Of Hindi
- Department Of Urdu
- Department Of Mathematics
- Department Of English
