= Fazil Kashmiri =

Kashmiri poet, lyricist (1916-2004)

- Born: Ghulam Ahmad Fazil; August 3, 1916; Jammu and Kashmir, India
- Died: July 11, 2004 (aged 87); Srinagar, Jammu and Kashmir
- Citizenship: India
- Education: B.A.
- Alma mater: University of Punjab
- Occupation: Poet, Lyricist, Deputy Director Education Department JK
- Children: Zeeshan Fazil, Director DDK (Ranchi). Prof (Dr) Taskeena Fazil, Director Iqbal Institute of Culture and Philosophy, University of Kashmir. Tamjeeda Fazil, Assistant Manager (Steno), Jammu & Kashmir State Industrial Development Corporation.
- Writing career
- Pen name: Fazil Kashmiri
- Language: Kashmiri, Urdu
- Genres: Ghazal; Nazm; Rubaʿi; Qata; Marsiya; Munajat; Naʽat; Manqabat; Leela
- Subjects: Language, Literature
- Notable awards: Sahitya Akademi Award

Ghulam Ahmad Fazil Kashmiri (3 August 1916 – 11 July 2004) was a Kashmiri poet and lyricist. He was involved in Arabic, English, Persian, Urdu and particularly in Kashmiri literature. His uncertain work includes thirty six books published in various genres such as ghazal, nazm, rubaʿi, qata, marsiya, munajat, naʽat, manqabat and leela among others.

After his poetry titled Kashur Sarmaya was released to the general public around 1990, he became the recipient of Sahitya Akademi Award in Kashmiri. He wrote his first uncertain book when he was a student of class eighth.

== Biography ==
He started his literary career from the Islamia High School, Srinagar when he was studying in class 8th. He later wrote a poem titled Kral-e-Koor (Potter's Lass) which was published in S. P. College's magazine Pratap around 1936. Inspired by Rasool Mir, he wrote a naat titled Saghar-e-Masti in the memory of Mir. He significantly contributed to Kashmiri language and literature. He also used to write Islamic poetry and published a books titled Anwar-e-Mohammadi, consisting religious poetry in praise of the Islamic prophet, Muhammad. Its 14th edition was released in 2013 by the Adbee Markaz Kamraz.

Fazil Memorial Award established by the government of Jammu and Kashmir is named after him. It is awarded by the Fazil Memorial Committee to the Kashmir writers in recognition of their contributions to the Kashmiri language and literature.

== Awards ==
Year	Award	Nominated work	Result	Note	Ref.
1990	Sahitya Akademi Award	Kashur Sarmaya	Won	—N/a	
2004	State Cultural Academy Award	Kashmiri literature	Won	Awarded by the government of Jammu and Kashmir in recognition of his contribution to Kashmiri poetry	
