= Political movements in Jammu and Kashmir (princely state) =

Under Dogra rule, people in the princely state of Jammu and Kashmir launched several political movements. Despite ideological differences and varying goals they aimed to improve the status of Muslims in a state ruled by a Hindu dynasty.

== Background ==
The princely state of Jammu and Kashmir was created in 1846, through the Treaty of Amritsar, between the British Empire, who had taken the Kashmir Valley, Ladakh and Gilgit Baltistan from the earlier Sikh rule, and Gulab Singh, a Dogra from Jammu who subsequently initiated the Dogra dynasty which ruled Jammu and Kashmir as a princely state of British India for the next century. The state had been constituted between 1820 and 1858 and became one of the largest princely states in British India.

The princely state combined disparate regions which were ethnically, culturally and linguistically different to each other. In the south was the Jammu region with a population ethnically related to Punjabis and comprising a mix of Hindus, (Sunni) Muslims and Sikhs. In the center of the state was the Kashmir Valley, whose population was ethnically Kashmiri and overwhelmingly Sunni Muslim with a small Hindu Brahmin minority known as Pandits, while in the east was Ladakh whose population was ethnically and culturally Tibetan and practised Buddhism. In the northeast of the state was Baltistan where the people were ethnically related to Ladakhis but practised Shia Islam while in the Gilgit Agency the population was a mixture of diverse, mostly Shia groups.

The princely rule was an overwhelming Hindu state. Under the Hindu rule, Muslims were subject to heavy taxation, institutionalized discrimination and forced labor without wages. A Hindu elite ruled over a vast, impoverished and exploited Muslim peasantry who were deprived of organised political representation until the 1930s. A significant number of Muslims from Kashmir Valley migrated to the Punjab province of British India due to such conditions in the princely state.

== Pre-1931 developments ==
Kashmir's native Hindu Pandits dominated the revenue department which collected taxes from Muslim cultivators. Due to their dominance in the revenue department, the Pandit community came to hold large landholdings. Despite being a small percentage of the Valley's population, the Pandit community possessed 30 percent of land in the Valley. Their authority increased under Maharajah Ranbir Singh, who introduced the chakdari system in 1862 under which there were very easy conditions to grant allotments of uncultivated land.

=== Shawl Bauf agitation ===
To protest against the Dogra authorities' hefty taxation, Kashmiri shawl weavers went on strike and gathered to protest outside the residence of Raj Kak Dhar, who was the Kashmiri Pandit official in charge of the Shawl Department who misinformed Colonel Bijoy Singh that he was being attacked while weavers were protesting without arms. When the unarmed protesters refused to accept the orders, the troops charged them with spears. Scores of protesters jumped off the Haji Rather Sum Bridge at Zaldgar, in the hope they would hide in the marsh underneath, but at least 28 bodies were recovered from the river, and over 100 sustained wounds. This incident was followed by the migration of 4000 weavers from the Valley to the Punjab.

=== Developments in the late 19th century ===
In 1877-1879 the Kashmir Valley witnessed a severe famine, with some authorities estimating the death toll as 60 percent of Kashmir Valley's population. The ban on leaving the state was lifted and many Kashmiris subsequently left the Valley and migrated to the Punjab. During the famine, Pandits claimed lands left by Muslim cultivators who had migrated to the Punjab as uncultivated land and took ownership under the chakdari system.

Apprehensive of developments in Afghanistan, the British colonial authorities in 1895 called on the Dogra state to attend to the Muslim population's needs. Colonial authorities had already been thinking in 1884 if the British government had delayed in intervening on behalf of the Muslims.

== 1931 agitation ==
Prior to 1931, Muslims in the state were divided into several groups, each with its own demands. In 1920, the silk factory workers struck work to call for a pay rise. Four years later, they launched an even bigger agitation due to poor working conditions. The Reading Room Party from Srinagar endeavored to gain improved education facilities and more administrative work opportunities for Muslims. In Jammu, the Muslim Young Men's League in Jammu involved itself in covert activities geared towards obtaining independence for the state. In 1930, the Kashmiris started their freedom movement against Dogra rule.

These early activities were not broad in their scope but in July 1931 Kashmir's Muslims launched their first massive protest against the Dogra regime. Encouraged by the ulama, Kashmiri Muslims rebelled against what they saw as an unfair Hindu administration.

On 13 July 1931, several Kashmiri Muslims protesting the arrest of Abdul Qayyum (a non-Kashmiri arrested for encouraging people to rebel against the Dogra rule) were shot dead by police firing. The protests gained momentum after the killings and for the first time communal rioting broke out in the Valley, in which three Hindus were killed. Muslims termed the anti-Dogra movement a 'religious war'. The Maharajah Hari Singh instituted the Glancy Commission to inquire into the Muslim complaints, although this move was vehemently opposed by the Kashmiri Pandits.

After this major agitation Hari Singh reluctantly introduced democracy to the state following British intercession. In what political scientist Ishtiaq Ahmed describes as a 'positive' development, the Maharajah allowed his subjects to create political groups. However, the democratic system was very limited, offering only restricted freedoms, and did not include universal adult franchise with only five percent of state subjects being given the right to vote for a practically powerless Praja Sabha (People's Assembly). Only six percent of Muslims in the state had the right to vote, compared with 25 percent of non-Muslims who did have the right.

== Formation of Muslim Conference ==
In 1932 Kashmiri Muslims created their political organisation, the All Jammu and Kashmir Muslim Conference. The organisation commanded the support of Muslims from a range of socio-economic backgrounds. The organisation put forward a range of economic demands which would uplift each constituent class such as landed rights, more openings in the civil service for educated Muslims, improved labour conditions and lower taxation. Demands of religious nature concerning mosques were also put forward. The organisation wished to represent all the state's Muslims in their demands for more rights and both Jammu and the Kashmir Valley contributed to composing the leadership of the party.

== Transformation into National Conference ==
In its earlier stage the Muslim Conference was a party aiming for the political unification of Muslims on the basis of Islamic solidarity. According to historian Mridu Rai, the religious aspect of the movement was a reaction to the state exerting its 'Hinduness' and discriminating against Muslims due to their religion.

However, Maulana Sayeed Masoodi, Bakshi Ghulam Muhammad and Sheikh Abdullah desired that the Muslim movement be converted turn into a secular struggle for the political and economic upliftment of all the state's residents. Their desire was encouraged by the emergence of secular labor unions such as the Farmer's Union, Government Sericulture, Kashmir Youth League, Silk Labor Union Peasants Association, Students Federation, Telegraph Employees Union and Turpentine Labor Union.

In a special session in June 1939 the Muslim Conference was converted into the All Jammu and Kashmir National Conference to represent all Kashmiris regardless of religion. This move brought the National Conference closer to the Indian National Congress which also favored a secular and non-communal approach to politics. This move towards secularizing the movement was apparently reinforced by the advice of Dr Saifuddin Kitchlew, an eminent member of the Kashmiri diaspora in the Punjab, to Sheikh Abdullah.

== Split of National Conference ==
Some Muslim Conference leaders, particularly those from Jammu, objected to the National Conference's moves towards secularizing Kashmir's politics. They accurately suspected that the National Conference would become close to the Indian National Congress. Mirwaiz Yusuf Shah's Azad Muslim Conference and some breakaway cadres of the Muslim Conference in the districts of Kotli, Mirpur and Poonch created a local branch of the All India Muslim League.

The National Conference continued to struggle internally over the question of the secular approach. Two factions were present within the party. One faction sought to continue the secular approach while another preferred a Muslim identity-based approach. This tension also brought to the fore the ethnic divisions between the Kashmiri Muslims of the Valley and the Jammu region's Muslims, the latter sharing stronger ties to Punjabi Muslims.

The Pakistan Resolution gained the backing of Muslim leadership in the districts of Muzaffarabad, Poonch and Mirpur and these leaders finally separated from the National Conference in 1941, reviving the Muslim Conference. Muslim leaders from Poonch, Mirpur and Muzaffarabad districts supported the Pakistan resolution and in 1941 formally broke away and revived the Muslim Conference, with Chaudhry Ghulam Abbas and Syed Aziz Badshah. The group's objective was the establishment of a Muslim state under Islamic law and although it had little support in the Kashmir Valley, it had large support from Muslims in the districts of Bhaderwah, Jammu, Mirpur, Poonch and Rajouri.

== Struggle of National Conference ==
The National Conference retained its popularity in the Kashmir Valley and coordinated its struggle closely with that of the Indian National Congress. Sheikh Abdullah struggled against the authority of the Dogra rule be ended, demanding the cancellation of the Treaty of Amritsar. Sheikh Abdullah related Kashmir's struggle as a "logical extension" of the Indian independence movement. In 1944 the National Conference adopted a New Kashmir manifesto whereby it extended its demands from Muslim welfare to political and economic restructuring of the state. In the National Conference's annual session in 1945 it espoused a resolution embracing Indian unity, Indian independence and self-determination for India's cultural nationalities.

In the Quit Kashmir Movement, the National Conference turned to using demonstrations after the Maharajah Hari Singh moved to forcefully quell the struggle. These demonstrations were met with mass incarcerations and firing. Sheikh Abdullah, Maulana Masoodi and Sardar Budh Singh were tried for inciting agitation against the Dogra authorities. Despite Jawaharlal Nehru's support, the poor organisational planning of the National Conference as well as the Dogra regime's use of force led to the Quit Kashmir movement dwindling.

== Struggles within National Conference ==
Despite the religious and secular factions of the National Conference having formally split earlier, the remaining National Conference was still left in turmoil between its Muslim and Hindu members. The Dogra government used divide and rule policies; banning all subjects except members of the Dogra Rajput community from holding firearms, and this brought to the fore tensions between Hindu and Muslim members of the National Conference.

The tensions between the Hindu and Muslim members of the National Conference increased when in October 1943, Sheikh Abdullah entered into secret talks with Muhammad Ali Jinnah and the Muslim Conference without taking Sardar Budh Singh, the party's president, into confidence. Jinnah's speech in Kashmir in which he encouraged Muslim unity caused deep fissures in the National Conference's memberships. The party did not break again, mainly due to the realisation of the Hindu and Sikh members about its political potential. The National Conference did not agree to Jinnah's proposals that Abdullah accept Abbas' leadership and come under the Muslim League's wing.

== Activities of Muslim Conference ==
Rejecting the domination of the Hindu minority the Muslim Conference demanded a transfer of power from the Dogra monarchy to themselves. In its 1945 manifesto the Muslim Conference declared in favour of Jinnah and his movement for an independent Muslim homeland, pledging the state's Muslims to the movement. The organization opposed the Quit Kashmir movement and accused the National Conference of working against Muslim unity and helping Hindu domination in collaboration with the Congress. The Muslim Conference undertook Direct Action, a civil disobedience program. But there was a pause in party activism when the Dogra state arrested most of the Muslim Conference's leadership. Abbas desperately appealed to revive the civil disobedience program while incarcerated, but Chowdhary Hamidullah convinced Jinnah to discard the program.

== Developments in 1947 ==
Although the main members of both the National Conference and Muslim Conference were imprisoned, the state administration held elections in January 1947 for the state assembly (Praja Sabha). The electorate was limited. The Muslim Conference, under duress at the time, gained victory in 16 of the 21 seats which in the Assembly were reserved for Muslims. The election had been boycotted by the National Conference, thus allowing a Muslim Conference claim to victory. The National Conference cited the low voter turnout as evidence that their boycott appeal had been heeded. The Muslim Conference's argument was that the boycott call had gone unheeded and that the low turnout of voters was because of snowfall.

The main parties on the state were divided on the question of the state's future after the independence of India and Pakistan. The National Conference mused on the question of joining either of the two countries or seeking independence. Its priority, however, was ending the Maharajah's rule and replacing it with self-government. 17 days before the Maharaja finally acceded to India, Sheikh Abdullah said"Our prime concern at this stage is the emancipation of the four million people living in this State. We can consider the question of joining one or the other Dominion only when we have attained our objective." However, neither Abdullah nor the Maharaja wanted to join Pakistan which would weaken them.

The Maharajah himself was interested in preserving the state's independence and in this decision he had the support of the Jammu and Kashmir Rajya Hindu Sabha and the Muslim Conference. The Muslim Conference favored the accession of the state to Pakistan but had temporarily adopted a ruse by championing independence for the State and further cautioned Hari Singh from joining India. Acting Muslim Conference President, Chaudhry Hamidullah, claimed that the Muslim Conference still wanted to join Pakistan but would 'sacrifice' this desire to 'allay the fears of Hindu and Sikh minorities in the state'. However, the Muslim Conference quickly dropped this ruse by 22 July and from that date openly demanded the Maharajah to join Pakistan.

The second party supporting the accession of the state to Pakistan was Prem Nath Bazaz's Kisan Mazdoor Conference which, according to the Civil Military Gazette, enjoyed popularity in the southern portion of the Kashmir Valley. However, the National Conference was said to be the premier popular party in the Kashmir Valley due to Sheikh Abdullah's popularity for advocating land reforms. Abdullah's secularism is also said to have appealed to the ethnic Kashmiris of the Valley, while the Muslim Conference enjoyed popularity among Muslims in the Jammu province. But neither parties had a substantial base in the Frontier Districts Province. According to Yaqoob Khan Bangash, the population in the Gilgit Agency and surrounding areas disliked the State rule and considered themselves to be ethnically different from Kashmiris and favored merger Pakistan.

== Role of Kashmiri diaspora ==
Kashmiri Muslims who had fled the Kashmir Valley to the Punjab maintained emotional and familial links to their homeland and had a feeling they were morally duty bound to struggle for their brethren against the Dogra rule. Through the All India Kashmir Muslim Conference, founded in Lahore, the Kashmiri community in Punjab campaigned in support of Kashmiris although the organisation's primary function was to financially assist poor Kashmiri Muslim students seeking education outside the state. The Kashmir Muslim Conference provided Kashmiris in Punjab with a platform to complain of the "lack of equal opportunities" for Kashmiris in the Punjab and also to raise grievances concerning the Dogra rule in Kashmir. In its fourth meeting in 1913 in Gujranwala, the Kashmir Muslim Conference demanded that Maharajah Pratap Singh address Muslim grievances. Prominent Kashmiris in Punjab such as Muhammad Iqbal gave their backing to the cause of Kashmiris through organisations such as Anjuman-i-Himayat-i-Islam and the Anjuman-i-Kashmiri Musalman.
