= Government Polytechnic College Anantnag =

College in Jammu and Kashmir

Govt. Polytechnic College Anantnag
- Established: 2012
- Location: Larkipora, Anantnag
- Academic Affiliation: https://gpcanantnag.edu.in
- Number of Students: 360

Government Polytechnic College Larkipora Anantnag is a college located in Anantnag, Jammu and Kashmir, and affiliated with the Jammu and Kashmir Department of Technical Education.

The college was established in 2012 under the centrally sponsored scheme “Setting up new Polytechnics” by the Ministry of Human Resources Development within the government of India. It has a campus of around 9.5 acres at Larkipora and is an AICTE-approved college for polytechnic and government institution. The J&K State Board of Technical Education is situated at Larkipora, Dooru, Anantnag, Jammu And Kashmir. This college offers polytechnic diploma courses in India, offering ITI courses for technical education. Eligibility for admission may depend on state entrance exams.

== History ==
The college was established in 2012 by the Jammu and Kashmir Government "to impart technical skills and expertise in the state's bright and young aspiring minds". The college admits approximately 120 students per year.
