= Mahjoor =

Kashmiri poet (1887–1952)

Peerzada Ghulam Ahmad Mahjoor
- مَہجوٗر
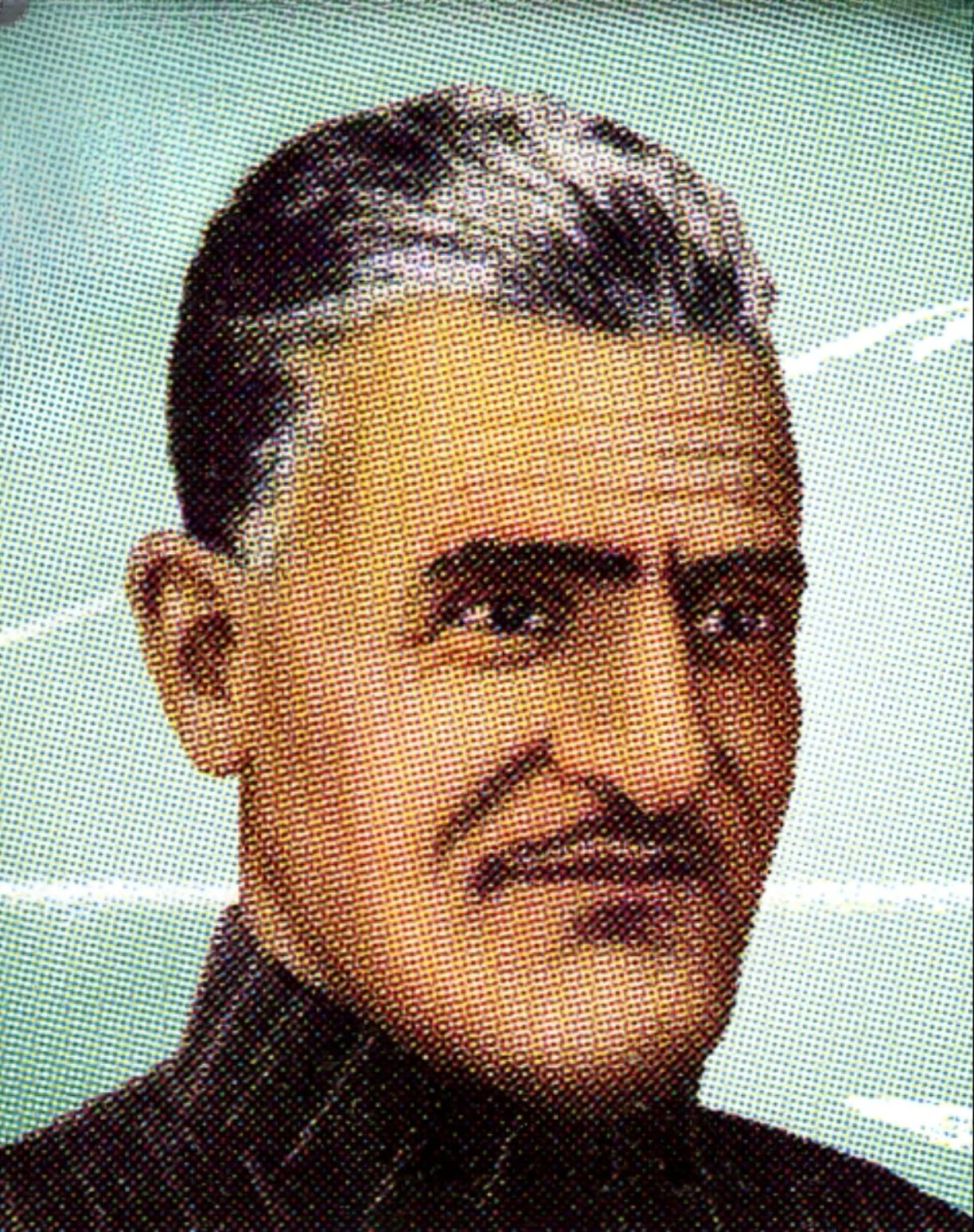
- Ghulam Ahmad Mahjoor on a 2013 stamp of India
- Born: 11 August 1885; Mitrigam, Kashmir and Jammu
- Died: 9 April 1952 (aged 66); Mitrigam, India Administered Jammu and Kashmir
- Resting place: Mitrigam (exhumed) then Athwajan, Jammu–Srinagar National Highway, Kashmir
- Occupations: Regional administrator, Poet
- Writing career
- Pen name: Mahjoor
- Notable works: Poshe-mati – Janano, Bage Nishat Ke Gulo, Sahibo sath cham

Peerzada Ghulam Ahmad (August 1885 − 9 April 1952), known by his pen name as Mahjoor, was a poet of the Kashmir Valley. He is especially noted for introducing a new style into Kashmiri poetry and for expanding Kashmiri poetry into previously unexplored thematic realms. Mahjoor is recognized as father of Kashmiri poetry.

== Early life ==
Mahjoor was born in the village of Mitrigam (Urdu pronunciation: [mɪt̪ɾiːɡɑːm], Kashmiri pronunciation: [mitɨrʲɡoːm]), Pulwama, 25 miles (40 km) from Srinagar. He got his pen name Mahjoor when he visited Punjab and started writing poetry under the influence of great Urdu poet, Shibli Nomani. He followed in the academic footsteps of his father, who was a scholar of Persian language. He received the primary education from the Maktab of Aashiq Trali (a renowned poet) in Tral. After passing the middle school examination from Nusrat-ul-Islam School, Srinagar, he went to Punjab where he came in contact with Urdu poets like Bismil Amritsari and Moulana Shibli Nomani. He returned to Srinagar in 1908 and started writing in Persian and then in Urdu. Determined to write in his native language, Mahjoor used the simple diction of traditional folk storytellers in his writing.

Mahjoor worked as a Patwari (Regional Administrator in Department of Revenue). He was posted at Handwara which is one of the oldest tehsils of Kashmir. Along with his official duties, he spent his free time writing poetry, and his first Kashmiri poem 'Vanta hay vesy' was published in 1918. His poems explored a variety of subjects including love, fostering unity among communities, advocating for social change, and shedding light on the struggles faced by the people of Kashmir.

== Poetic legacy ==
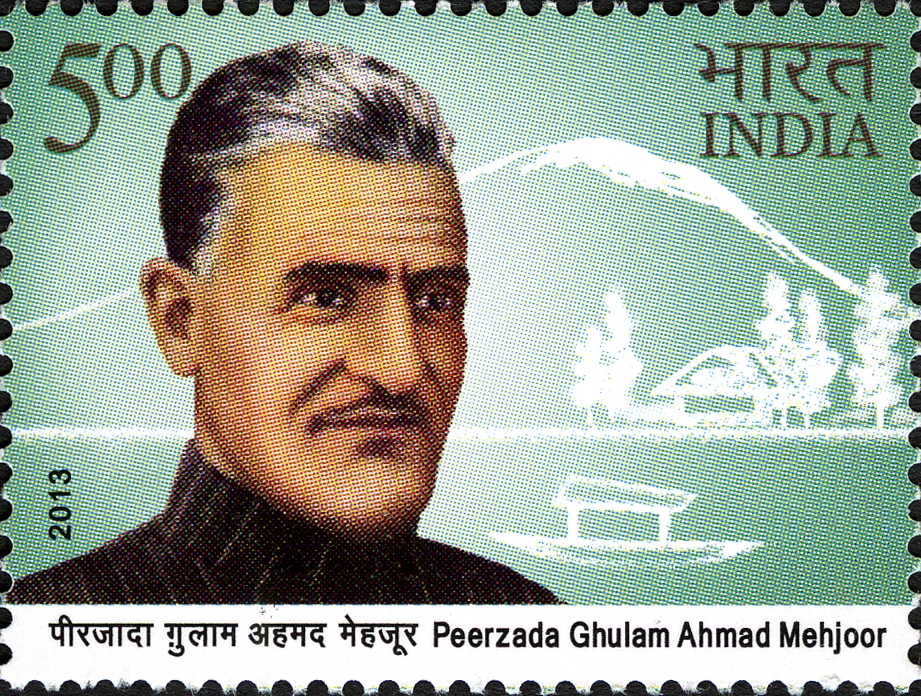
Mahjoor on 2013 stamp of India.

Mahjoor is recognized by one commentator as a poet who revolutionized the traditional forms of nazm and ghazal. His books were widely read across the educated folks of Srinagar and at his honour, an area near "Jawahar Nagar" and "padshehi bagh" in Srinagar was named as "Mahjoor nagar"

In 1972, a bilingual film named Shayar-e-Kashmir Mahjoor was released with the Hindi version starring Balraj Sahni. A square in Srinagar is named after him. He is buried near the poet Habba Khatoon at a site near Athwajan on the Jammu-Srinagar national highway.

A song featured in Coke Studio Explorer, "Ha Gulo" is written by Mahjoor and was sung by Kashmiri regional band Qasamir.

== Common themes of his poetry ==
One of his renowned poetic compositions is 'Bage Nishat ke Gulo,' which stirs excitement and emotions within the readers. He possessed a profound fascination with the natural beauty of Kashmir, and his poetry consistently portrays the picturesque gardens, meadows, forests, waterfalls, rivers, lush green fields, and majestic mountains. Through these mesmerizing descriptions, he effectively conveys his heartfelt emotions and impassioned messages, urging his fellow countrymen to stand up against various forms of injustice. His verses not only celebrate the scenic bounty of Kashmir but also ignite a sense of pride and patriotism, motivating the people to become catalysts for positive change in their society. Rabindranath Tagore called Mehjoor 'Wordsworth of Kashmir,' acknowledging the romantic elements in his poetry.

== Bibliography ==
- Ghulam Ahmad Mahjoor. Poems of Mahjoor. New Delhi: Sahitya Academi, 1988.
- Ghulam Ahmad Mahjoor. The Best of Mahjoor: Selections from Mahjoor's Kashmiri Poems (translated by Triloki Nath Raina). Srinagar, India: J&K Academy of Art, Culture and Languages, 1989.
