= Doru Shahabad =

Town in Anantnag, Jammu and Kashmir

Doru Shahabad Door Shahabad
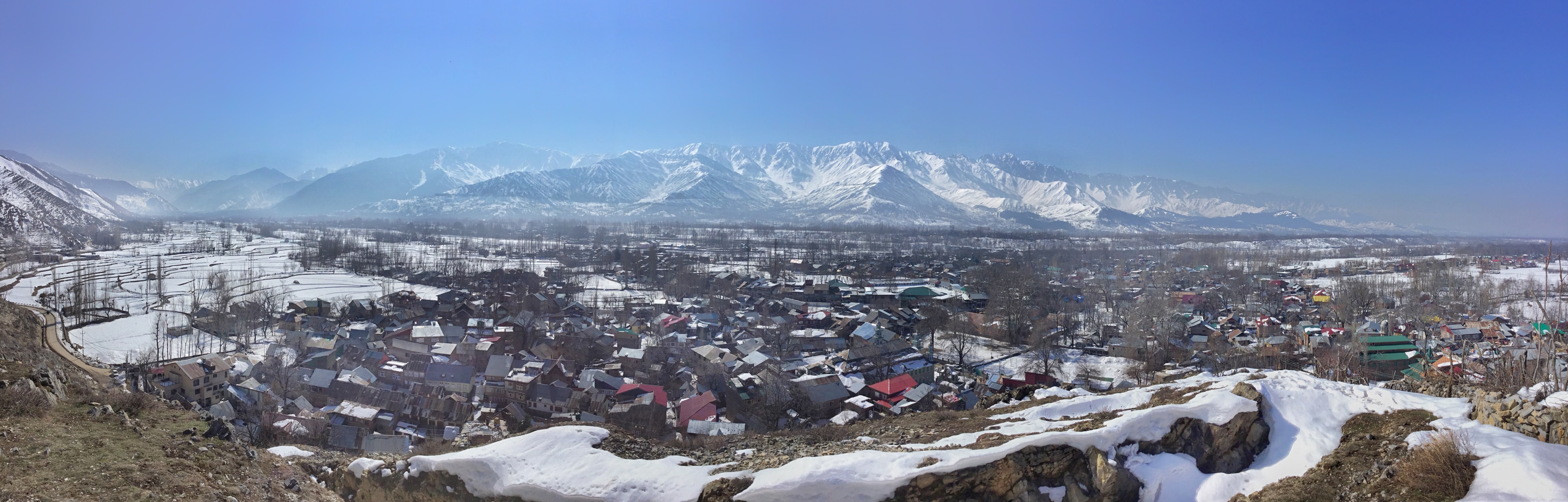
- Aerial view of the town

- Location in Anantnag, India Doru Shahabad (India)
- Coordinates: 33.43°N 75.09°E
- Country: India
- Union territory: Jammu and Kashmir
- District: Anantnag

Languages
  - Official: Kashmiri, Urdu, Hindi, Dogri, English
- Time zone: UTC+5:30 (IST)
- Postal code: 192211
- Vehicle registration: JK03

Dooru Shahabad or Door Shahabad is a town and the headquarters of the Dooru tehsil in the Anantnag district of the Indian union territory of Jammu and Kashmir. It is also known as a historical township in South Kashmir's Anantnag district. Doru Shahabad is considered as a place of intelligence, where great scholars like Mehmood Shah Gami, Rasul Mir Shahabadi were born. Religious scholars like Sanaullah Amritsari also share a lineage. These scholars contributed to the literature and culture of Kashmir. In present times, Shahabad has produced chief ministers such as Syed Mir Qasim, and other politicians, bureaucrats, and leading agricultural scientists.

== Demographics ==
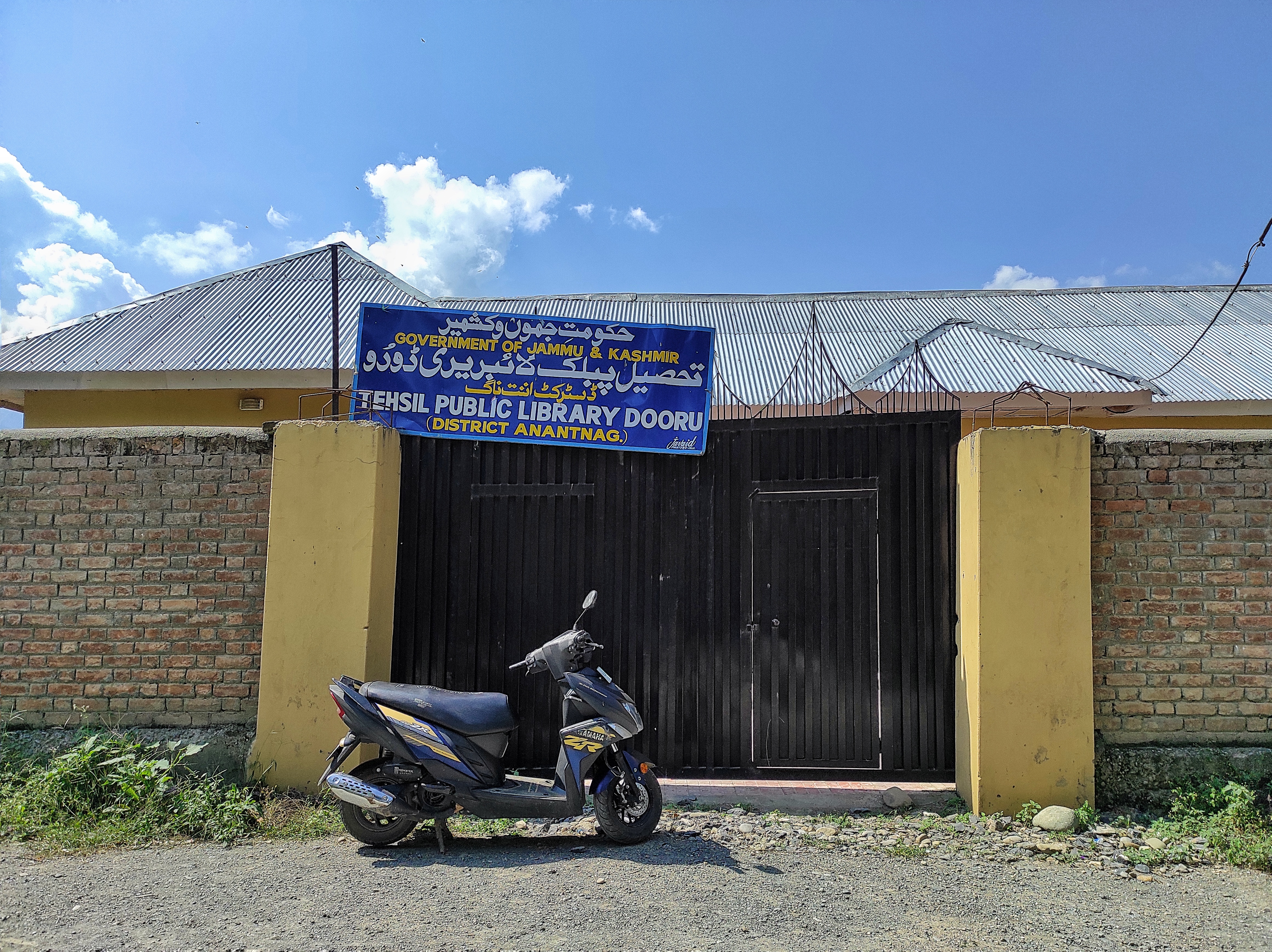
Tehsil Library, Dooru Shahabad

According to the 2011 Indian census, Doru had a population of 19,429. Males constituted 53% of the population and females 47%. Doru had an average literacy rate of 70.61%, higher than the national average of 68%, with 83.09% of the males and 58.41% of females literate. 23% of the population was under 6 years of age.

== Literature ==
Kashmiri poets, such as Rasul Mir, Mahmud Gami, Hamidullah an many others lived in Doru Shahabad. The religious Kashmiri pandit scholar Damodhar Pandita Shahabadi and Saadat Hasan Manto also had there roots in the town. Doru is also inhabited by heirs of Kashmiri poetry.

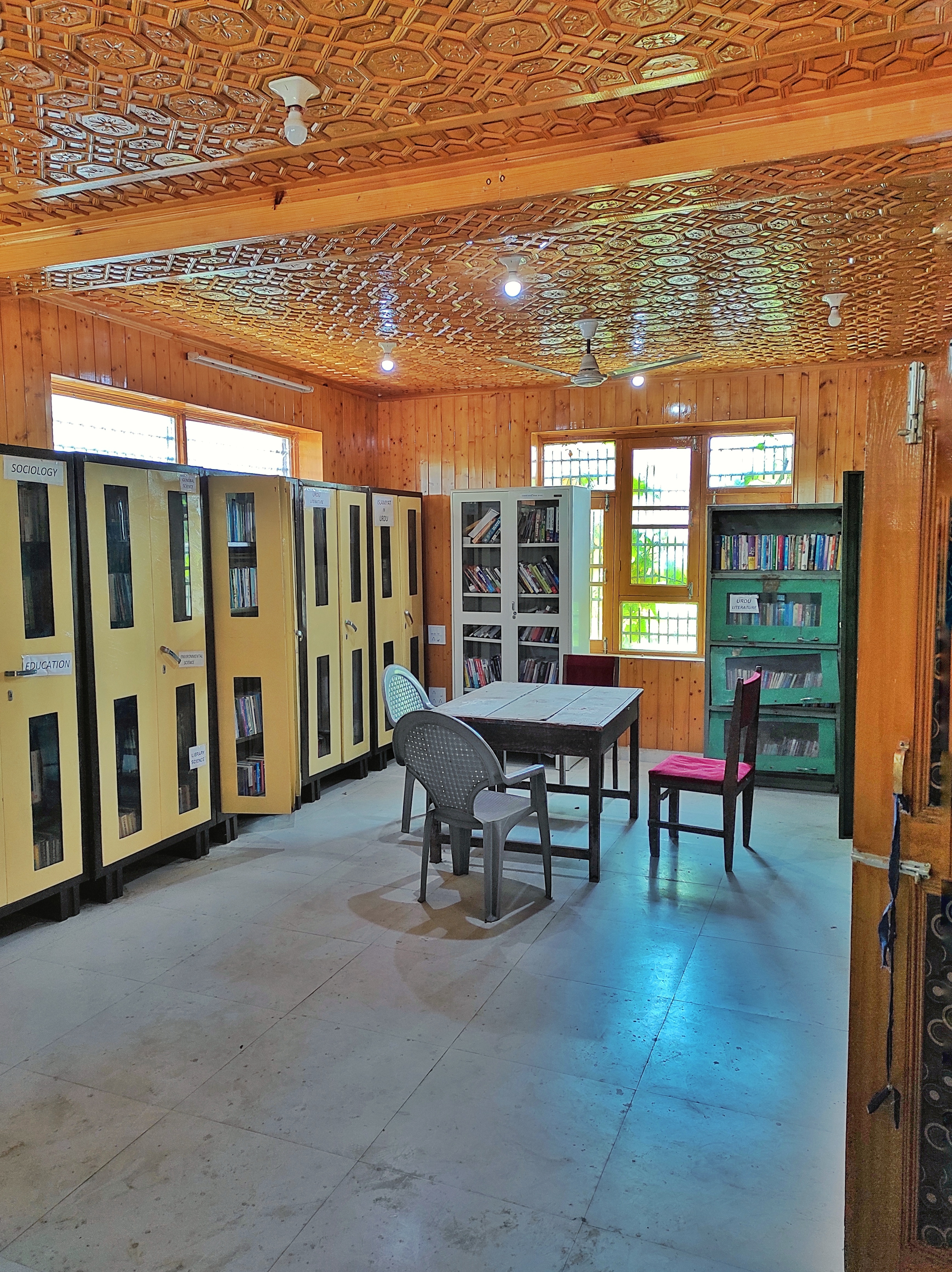
Tehsil Library, Dooru Shahabad

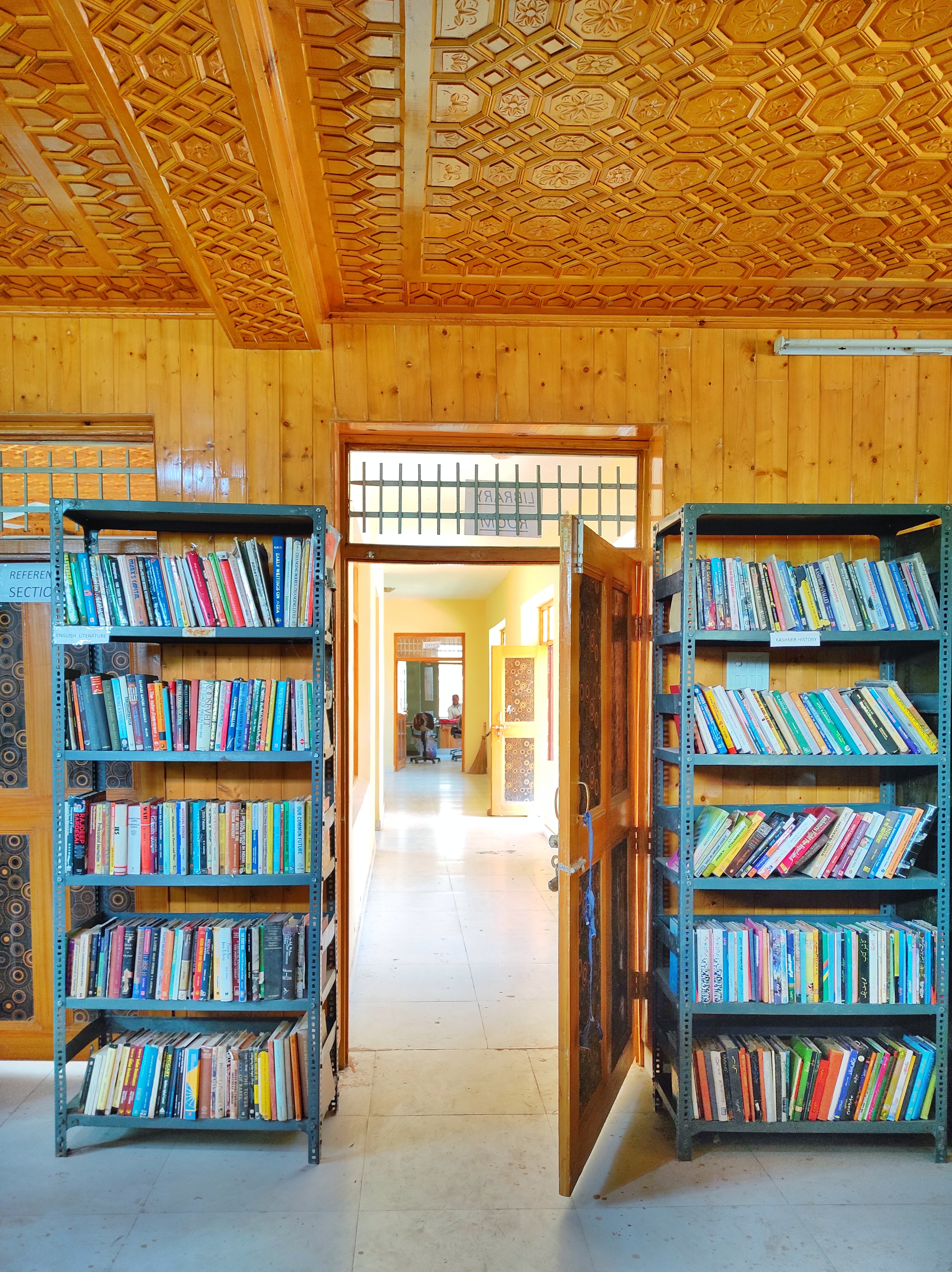
Tehsil Library, Dooru Shahabad

The historian of Zain-ul-Aabideen's court, Mullah Mohammad, who translated Rajatarangini from Sanskrit into Persian, was from Doru Shahabad.

=== Politics and activism ===
Doru was home to Ghulam Ahmad Itoo, a peasant reformer for Kashmiri peasants under the Dogra rule. Itoo was a pioneer of the Land Reform Movement which worked for the rights of Kashmiri peasants. He was jailed by the authorities. Syed Mir Qasim, who served as Jammu and Kashmir Chief Minister from 1971 to 1975, as well as social activist Abdul Gani Malik. Syed Hussain has been an M.L.A, M.L.C, chairman of the legislative council and executive member of several other as a member of the Rajya Sabha.

== Religion ==
The Khankah Faiz Panah shrine was constructed by Mir Mohammad Hamadani, the son of Ameer-i-Kabeer Mir Syed Ali Hamadani. The other important shrines of the town include Ziyarat Shah Mohammad Azam Sahib, Syed Jaffer Madani, and Shah Asraar. Hindu tirths such as Luk Bawan (Lokapunya), Vitasta, and Goswanigund are located in Doru.

== Settlements ==
The older muhallas (settlements) of the town are: Mohalla Shah Sahib, Mirmaidan (birthplace of Rasool Mir), Arabal, Sehpora, Mirgund, Bragam, Khudhamam, Nadoora, Ghaziabad (Nathipora) and Arampora (birthplace of Syed Mir Qasim).

New colonies like College Road and Iqbal Colony have developed more recently. The well-known spring and Mughal garden Verinag is located 4 kilometres from Doru Shahabad. The two other springs in the area, Shehilnag and Sumnag, are known as "siblings" of Verinag.
