= Sadura railway station =

Railway station in Sadura, Anantnag

Sadura Railway Station
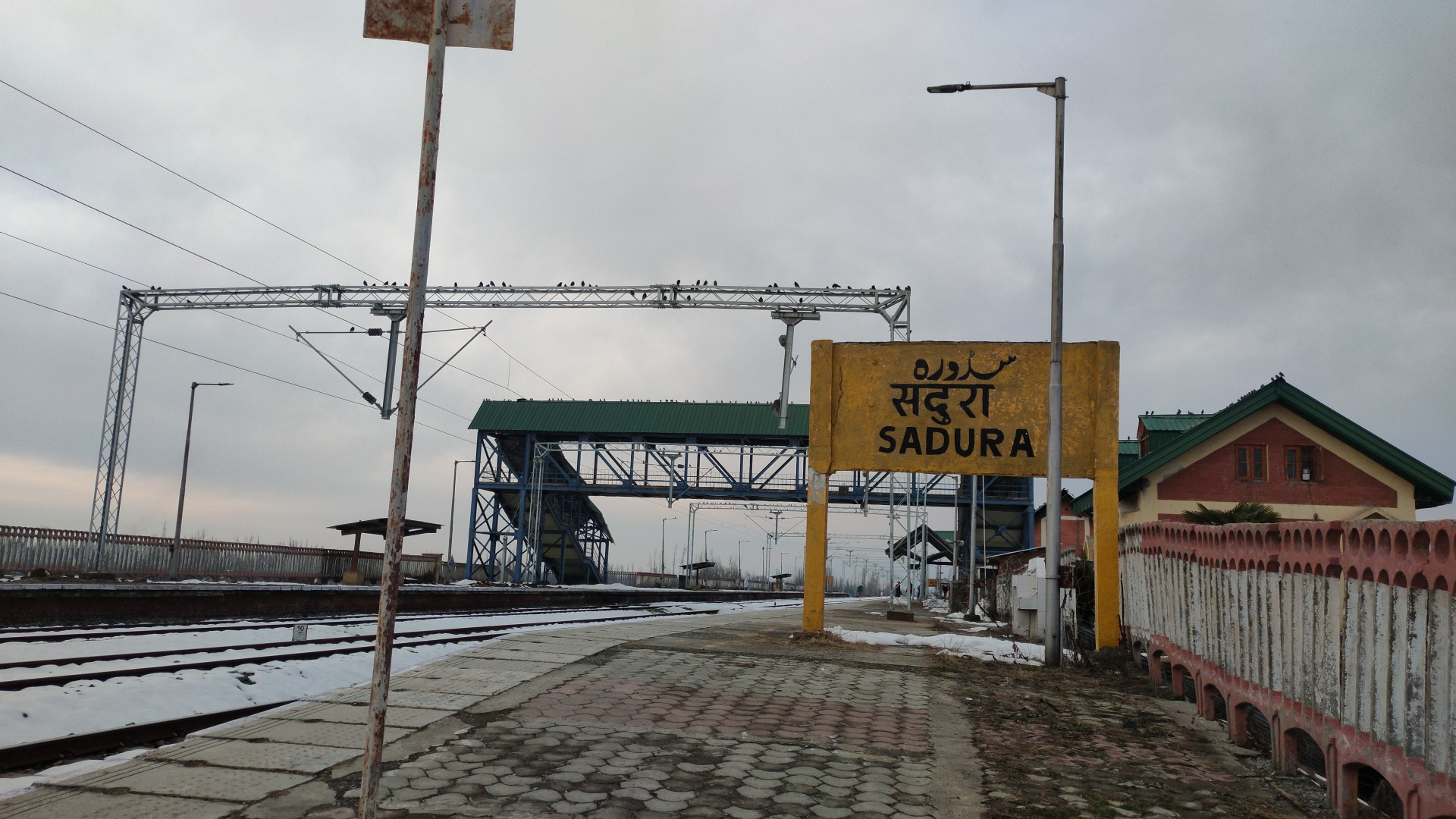
- Sadura Railway Station

General information
- Location: Sadura, Anantnag, Jammu and Kashmir, India
- Coordinates: 33.6756°N 75.1368°E
- System: Indian Railways station
- Owner: Ministry of Railways, Indian Railways
- Line: Northern railway
- Platforms: 2
- Tracks: 2

Construction
- Structure type: Standard on-ground station
- Parking: Yes

Other information
- Status: Active
- Station code: SDUA
- Fare zone: Northern railway

History
- Opened: 2008
Location

Sadura Railway Station is a railway station on the Northern railway network of India. It is the headquarters of Anantnag division of Northern Railway zone.

== History ==
The station was built as part of the Jammu–Baramulla line mega project, intending to link the Kashmir Valley with Jammu Tawi and the Indian rail network.

== Location ==
The station, in Sadura, is 8 km (5.0 mi) from the Anantnag.

== Design ==
The station features Kashmiri wood architecture, with an intended ambiance of a royal court which is designed to complement the local surroundings to the station. Station signage is predominantly in Urdu and English. The IRCTC intends to build a hotel near the site.

== See also ==
- Jammu–Baramulla line
- Srinagar International Airport
