= Anantnag railway station =

Railway station in Anantnag, India

Anantnag
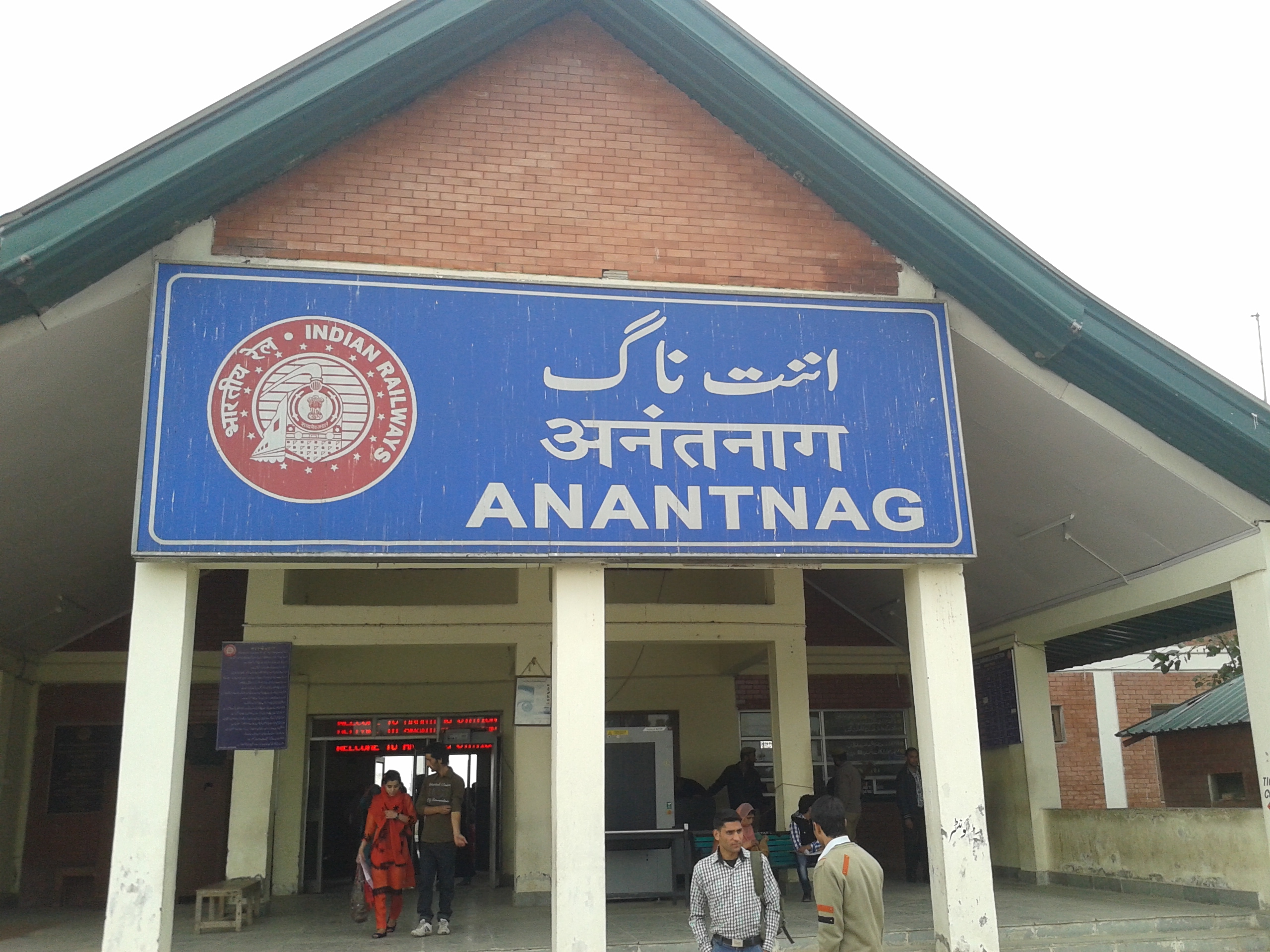

General information
- Location: Anantnag, Jammu and Kashmir; India
- Coordinates: 33.7386°N 75.1074°E
- Elevation: 1,599.89 metres (5,249.0 ft)
- System: Indian Railways station
- Line: Northern railway
- Platforms: 2
- Tracks: 2

Construction
- Structure type: Standard on-ground station
- Parking: Yes

Other information
- Status: Active
- Station code: ANT
- Zone(s): Northern Railway
- Division(s): Jammu

History
- Opened: 2008
Location

Anantnag Railway Station is a passenger and freight railway station located 4.2 kilometres (2.6 mi) west of the Anantnag city centre within the Northern Railway zone. Tha facility is also the headquarters of the NRZ's Anantnag division.

== History ==
The station has been built as part of the Jammu–Baramulla line megaproject, intending to link the Kashmir Valley with Jammu Tawi and the broader national rail network.

== See also ==
- Srinagar railway station
- Bijbehara railway station
- Jammu–Baramulla line
