= Anantnag =

Anantnag Islamabad
- City
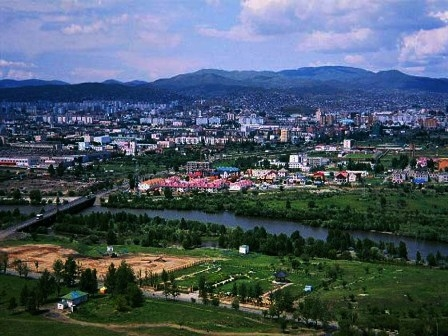
- Panorama of Anantnag
- Interactive map of Anantnag
- Coordinates: 33°44′07″N 75°08′52″E
- Administering country: India
- Union Territory: Jammu and Kashmir
- District: Anantnag
- Settled: 5 BCE

Area
  - Total: 40.44 km^{2} (15.61 sq mi)
- Elevation: 1,601 m (5,253 ft)

Population (2011)
  - Total: 159,838
  - Density: 3,952/km^{2} (10,240/sq mi)

Languages
  - Official: Kashmiri, Urdu, Hindi, Dogri, English

Demographics
  - Literacy: 73.8%
  - Sex ratio: 937.8 ♀/ 1000 ♂
- Time zone: UTC+5:30 (IST)
- PIN: 192 101
- Telephone code: 01932
- Vehicle registration: JK 03
- Website: anantnag.nic.in

Anantnag (Note: Urdu pronunciation: [ənənt̪nɑːɡ] ; Kashmiri pronunciation: [anat̪ʰnaːɡ]) (also called Islamabad (Note: Urdu pronunciation: [ɪslɑːmɑːbɑːd̪], Kashmiri pronunciation: [islaːmaːbaːd̪])) is the administrative headquarters of Anantnag district of Indian-administered Jammu and Kashmir in the disputed Kashmir region. It is located at a distance of 53 kilometres (33 miles) from the union territory's capital Srinagar. It is the third largest city in Jammu and Kashmir after Srinagar and Jammu with an urban agglomerate population of 159,838 and a municipal limit population of 109,433.

== Name ==
The town has been called by both the names Islamabad and Anantnag. The latter is characterised by Marc Aurel Stein as its "Hindu name".

"Anantnag" derives from the name of the spring at the southern end of the town, whose Sanskrit name Anantanāga was mentioned in the Nilamata Purana and other texts. According to the Gazetteer of Kashmir and Ladak, it is named after Ananta, the great serpent of Vishnu and the emblem of eternity.

The name Islamabad is believed to have derived from the name of a Mughal governor Islam Khan who built a garden in the area.

Both names are used for the town, Anantnag being preferred by the Hindus and Sikhs while Islamabad is preferred by the Muslims. The locals continue to use the name Islamabad, even though the Indian security forces deployed in the area from 1998 onwards frown on its use.

During the Dogra rule, Anantnag/Islamabad was the headquarters of one of Kashmir Valley's three districts, which was referred to as the "Anantnag wazarat".

== Geography ==
Anantnag is located at 33.73°N 75.15°E, at an elevation of 5,300 feet (1,600 m) above sea level, at a distance of 53 kilometres (33 mi) from Srinagar on NH 44 (former name NH 1A before renumbering of all national highways).

Climate data for Anantnag (1971–1986)
Month	Jan	Feb	Mar	Apr	May	Jun	Jul	Aug	Sep	Oct	Nov	Dec	Year
Mean daily maximum °C (°F)	7.3 (45.1)	8.4 (47.1)	14.0 (57.2)	20.5 (68.9)	24.5 (76.1)	29.6 (85.3)	30.2 (86.4)	29.8 (85.6)	27.3 (81.1)	22.2 (72.0)	15.1 (59.2)	8.2 (46.8)	19.7 (67.5)
Mean daily minimum °C (°F)	−2.1 (28.4)	−0.9 (30.4)	3.4 (38.1)	7.9 (46.2)	10.9 (51.6)	14.8 (58.6)	18.3 (64.9)	17.2 (63.0)	12.1 (53.8)	5.8 (42.4)	−0.1 (31.8)	−1.4 (29.5)	7.3 (45.1)
Average precipitation mm (inches)	47 (1.9)	69 (2.7)	122 (4.8)	88 (3.5)	67 (2.6)	36 (1.4)	61 (2.4)	77 (3.0)	31 (1.2)	33 (1.3)	32 (1.3)	54 (2.1)	717 (28.2)
Average precipitation days (≥ 1.0 mm)	7.0	8.3	11.1	8.2	8.2	5.9	7.7	6.6	3.5	3.1	3.0	5.9	78.5
Source: HKO

== Demographics ==
Anantnag Urban Agglomeration
Year	Pop.	±% p.a.
1911	9,019	—
1921	9,464	+0.48%
1931	13,752	+3.81%
1941	15,472	+1.19%
1951	16,536	+0.67%
1961	21,087	+2.46%
1971	32,414	+4.39%
1981	40,782	+2.32%
2001	97,896	+4.48%
2011	159,838	+5.02%

Religion in Anantnag city (2011)
Religion	Percent
Islam	98.6%
Hinduism	1.07%
Christianity	0.17%
Other or not stated	0.16%

There are three definitions of Anantnag:

- Anantnag Municipal Council: population in 2011: 109,433, area: 15.72 km^{2} (6.07 sq mi).
- Anantnag city including outgrowths: population in 2011: 150,592, area: 37.94 km^{2} (14.65 sq mi).
- Anantnag Urban Agglomeration: population in 2011: 159,838, area: 40.44 km^{2} (15.61 sq mi).

Including outgrowths, in 2011 the city's population had 77,508 males (52%) and 72,690 females (48%). There were 25,102 (16.7%) age 0–6: 13,528 males (54%) and 11,574 females (46%). The literacy rate for the people over six was 73.8% (males 81.0%, females 66.2%).

== Government and politics ==
The local body for Anantnag is called Municipal Council Anantnag. Anantnag has 25 wards. The local body elections in Anantnag took place in 2018 in which the party Indian National Congress won 20 wards and BJP won 3 wards. The President and Vice President are the elected heads of the Municipal Council. The elections are indirect elections. Hilal Ahmed Shah is the President of Municipal Council Anantnag.

=== District Development Council ===
- Chairperson: Yousuf Gorsi (JKNC)
- Vice-chairpwrson: Javaid Ahmad (JKPDP)

S.No	Party	Alliance	No. of Members
1.	INC	UPA	2
2.	JKNC	PAGD	6
3.	JKPDP	PAGD	4
4.	Independent		2
Total			14

== Sites ==
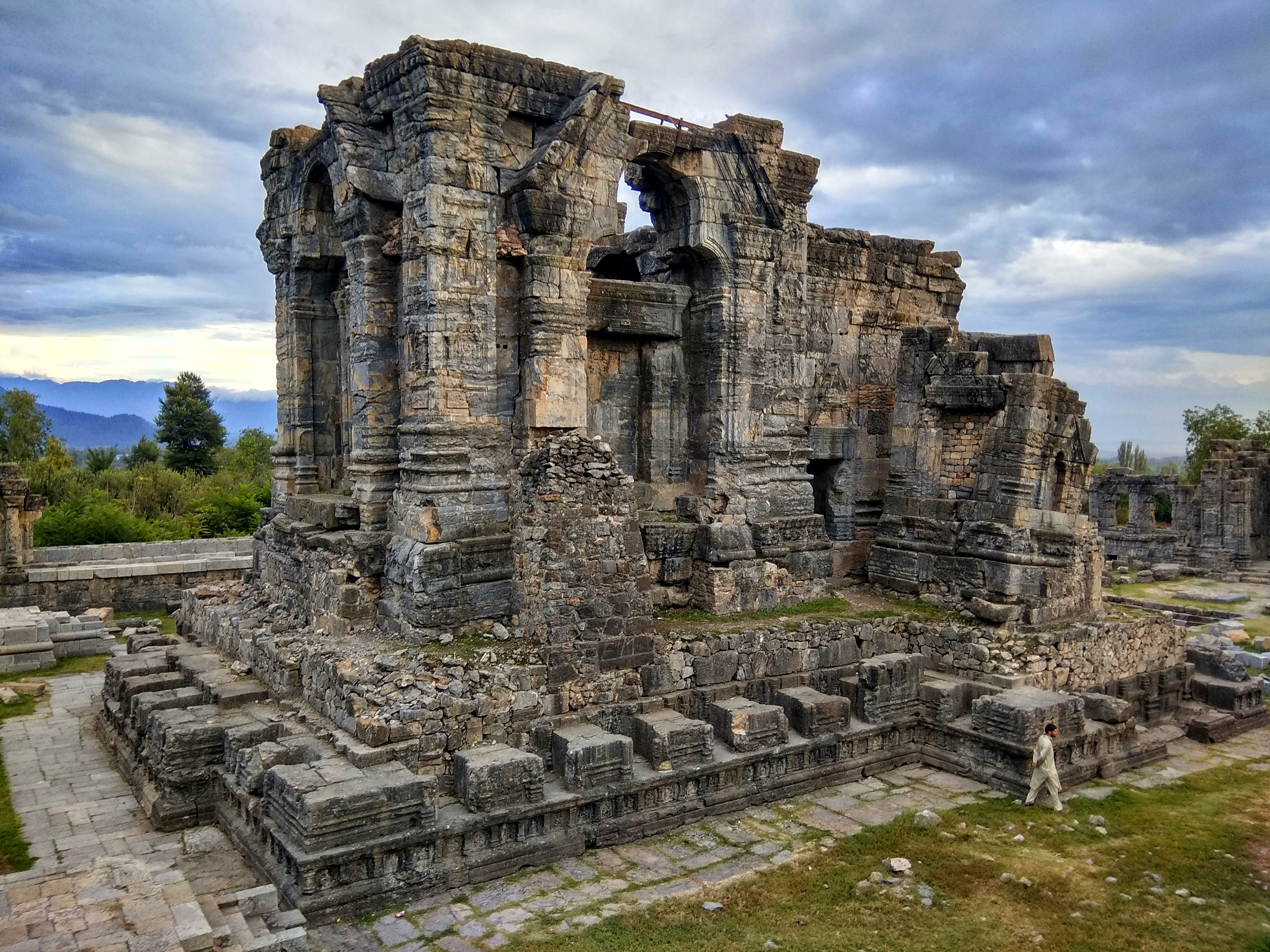
Martand Sun Temple

Masjid Baba Dawood Khaki is among the oldest mosques in the city, being built around 1400 CE.

The Martand Sun Temple is one of the important archaeological sites of Kashmir, built around 500 CE. It temple is situated at Kehribal, 9 km east-north-east of Anantnag and south of Mattan. This famous Sun Temple was destroyed by Ruler namely Sikander Buthshikan of Shahmiri Dynasty.

== Economy ==
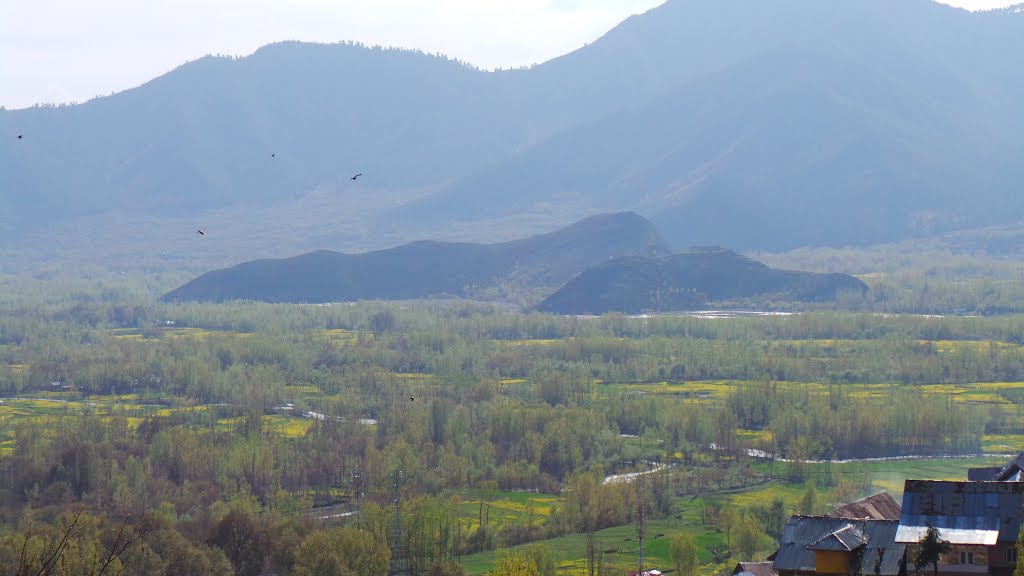
Mustard fields near Anantnag

In 2010 Anantnag was declared as major City of Export excellence with a total GDP of $3.7 billion. The high GDP of Anantnag is due to the centralised position and presence of high concentration of troops and migrant labours in it. Anantnag has a strategic position lying on the main North-South Corridor Road and with the highest number of tourist destinations it an economic hub of Kashmir Valley. The city suffered heavily during conflict times of the 1990s; many roads, bridges, and government buildings were reduced to ash. But in the 2000s, it made a quick recovery. It has been listed among 100 fastest economically developing cities.

== Transport ==
=== Road ===
Srinagar is 53 km from Anantnag on NH 44 (former name NH 1A before renumbering of all national highways). The distances of some other towns from Anantnag are: Achabal 10 km, Kokarnag 23 km, Doru Shahabad 20 km and Pahalgam 39 km. The city is served by National Highway 44. The city is gateway to the Kashmir valley as one side of Jawahar Tunnel opens here.

=== Rail ===
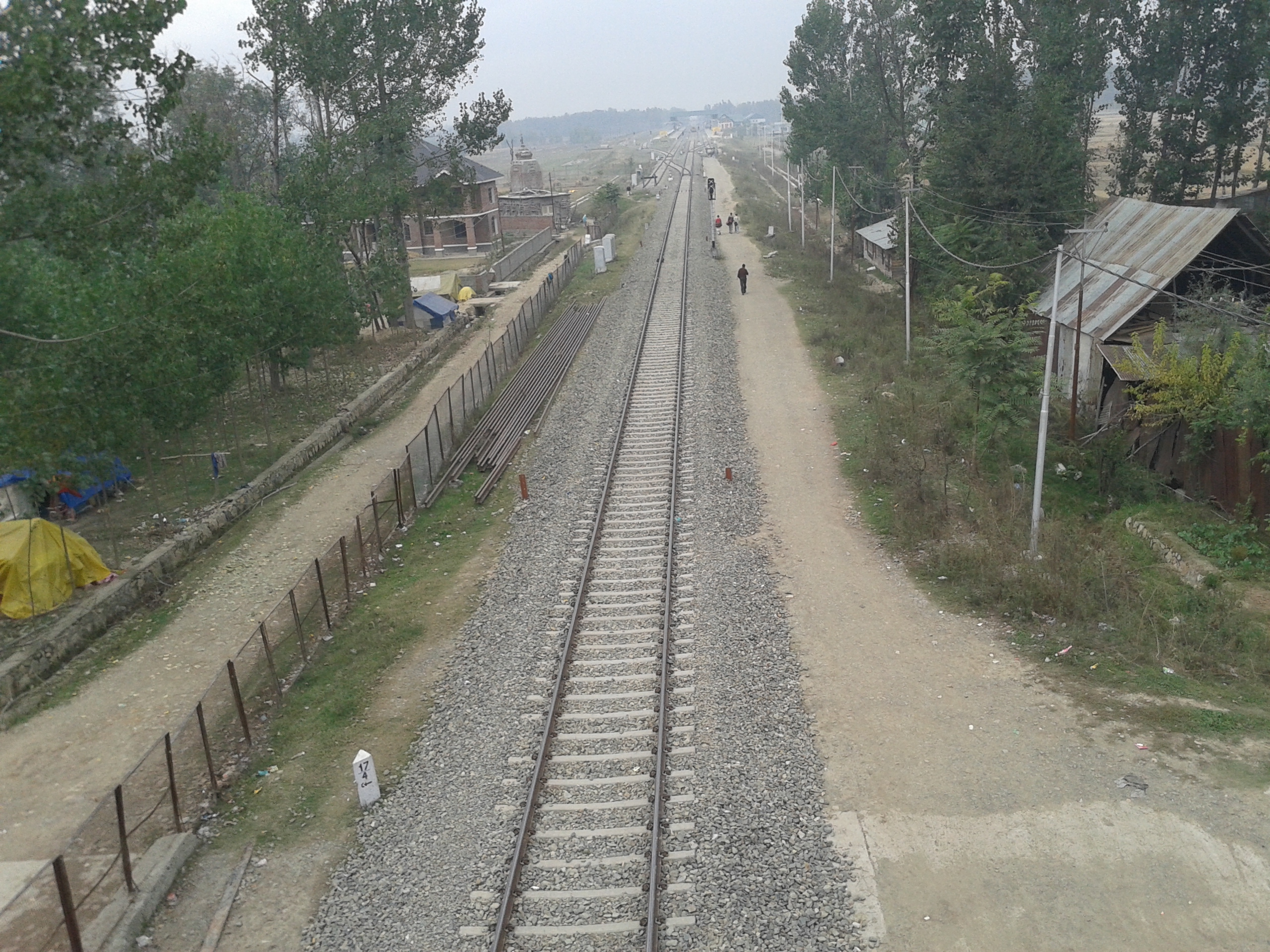
Track near the Anantnag railway station

Anantnag (ANT) is a station on the 119 km (74 mi) long Banihal-Baramulla line that started in October 2009 and connects Baramulla (BRML) and Srinagar to Banihal (BAHL), Qazigund. The railway track also connects to Banihal across the Pir Panjal mountains through a newly constructed 11 km long Banihal tunnel, and subsequently to the Indian railway network after a few years. It takes approximately 9 minutes and 30 seconds for a train to cross the tunnel. It is the longest rail tunnel in India. This railway system, proposed in 2001, is not expected to connect the Indian railway network until 2017 at the earliest, with a cost overrun of 55 billion INR. The train also runs during heavy snow across the Kashmir Valley.

== Education ==
There are numerous primary, middle secondary and higher secondary schools in the city. Of the higher education, the following establishments are notable:

- University of Kashmir South Campus, Anantnag
- Government Medical College, Anantnag
- Industrial Training Institute, Anantnag
- Government Degree College for Boys, Anantnag
- Government College for Women, Anantnag
- Government Boys Model Higher Secondary School, Brakpora, Anantnag
- Al Ahad College of Education, Anantnag
- Jamia College of Education, Anantnag
- Government Polytechnic College Anantnag
