= Srigufwara–Bijbehara Assembly constituency =

Constituency of the Jammu and Kashmir Legislative Assembly

Coordinates: 33.794°N 75.103°E

Srigufwara–Bijbehara
- Constituency No. 45 for the Jammu and Kashmir Legislative Assembly

Constituency details
- Country: India
- State: Jammu and Kashmir
- District: Anantnag
- Lok Sabha constituency: Anantnag–Rajouri
- Established: 1967

Member of Legislative Assembly
- Incumbent Bashir Ahmad Shah Veeri
- Party: JKNC
- Elected year: 2024

Srigufwara–Bijbehara Assembly constituency is one of the 90 constituencies in the Jammu and Kashmir Legislative Assembly of Jammu and Kashmir, located in the northern state of India. Srigufwara–Bijbehara is also a part of the Anantnag–Rajouri Lok Sabha constituency.

== Members of the Legislative Assembly ==
Election	Member	Party
1967	Mufti Mohammad Sayeed	Indian National Congress
1972	Saif Ud Din Dar	Indian National Congress
1977	Abdul Gani Shah	Jammu & Kashmir National Conference
1983	Abdul Gani Shah	Jammu & Kashmir National Conference
1987	Abdul Gani Shah	Jammu & Kashmir National Conference
1996	Mehbooba Mufti	Indian National Congress
1999 By-election	Abdul Rehman Bhat	Independent politician
2002	Abdul Rehman Bhat	Jammu and Kashmir People's Democratic Party
2008	Abdul Rehman Bhat	Jammu and Kashmir People's Democratic Party
2014	Abdul Rehman Bhat	Jammu and Kashmir People's Democratic Party
2024	Bashir Ahmad Shah Veeri	Jammu and Kashmir National Conference

== Election results ==
=== Assembly Election 2024 ===
2024 Jammu and Kashmir Legislative Assembly election : Srigufwara–Bijbehara
Party	Candidate	Votes	%	±%
JKNC	Bashir Ahmad Shah Veeri	33,299	53.63%	New
JKPDP	Iltija Mufti	23,529	37.89%	▼10.90
BJP	Sofi Yousif	3,716	5.98%	▲2.69
NOTA	None of the Above	1,552	2.50%	▲1.31
Margin of victory		9,770	15.73%	▲9.80
Turnout		62,096	60.83%	▲5.23
Registered electors		1,02,081		▲17.43
JKNC gain from JKPDP		Swing	▲4.84	

=== Assembly Election 2014 ===
2014 Jammu and Kashmir Legislative Assembly election : Srigufwara–Bijbehara
Party	Candidate	Votes	%	±%
JKPDP	Abdul Rehman Bhat	23,581	48.79%	▼1.09
JKNC	Bashir Ahmad Shah Veeri	20,713	42.85%	▲14.95
BJP	Pushkar Nath Pandita	1,591	3.29%	New
INC	Manzoor Ahmad Ganie	1,294	2.68%	New
BSP	Mushtaq Ahmad Sheikh	580	1.20%	▼0.30
NOTA	None of the Above	575	1.19%	New
Margin of victory		2,868	5.93%	▼16.04
Turnout		48,334	55.60%	▼5.15
Registered electors		86,929		▲12.96
JKPDP hold		Swing	▼1.09	

=== Assembly Election 2008 ===
2008 Jammu and Kashmir Legislative Assembly election : Srigufwara–Bijbehara
Party	Candidate	Votes	%	±%
JKPDP	Abdul Rehman Bhat	23,320	49.88%	▼8.44
JKNC	Bashir Ahmad Shah Veeri	13,046	27.90%	▲7.52
Independent	Ghulam Qadir Tak	4,612	9.86%	New
SP	Abdul Gani Bhat	1,553	3.32%	New
JKANC	Gulzar Ahmad Mir	1,189	2.54%	New
BSP	Mushtaq Ahmad Sheikh	703	1.50%	New
People's Democratic Front (Jammu and Kashmir)	Fayaz Ahmad Ganie	599	1.28%	New
Margin of victory		10,274	21.98%	▼15.96
Turnout		46,752	60.75%	▲44.09
Registered electors		76,954		▲25.49
JKPDP hold		Swing	▼8.44	

=== Assembly Election 2002 ===
2002 Jammu and Kashmir Legislative Assembly election : Srigufwara–Bijbehara
Party	Candidate	Votes	%	±%
JKPDP	Abdul Rehman Bhat	5,961	58.32%	New
JKNC	Abdul Gani Shah	2,084	20.39%	▼8.68
Independent	Mohammed Ashraf Thakroo	552	5.40%	New
BJP	Mohammed Yousuf Sofi	550	5.38%	▲3.95
INC	Mohammed Abdullah Nadaf	365	3.57%	▼2.72
Independent	Mohammed Ashraf Beg	275	2.69%	New
Independent	Bashir Ahmad Bhat	242	2.37%	New
Margin of victory		3,877	37.93%	▲23.43
Turnout		10,221	16.67%	▲0.86
Registered electors		61,322		▲12.42
JKPDP gain from Independent		Swing	▲14.75	

=== Assembly By-election 1999 ===
1999 Jammu and Kashmir Legislative Assembly by-election : Srigufwara–Bijbehara
Party	Candidate	Votes	%	±%
Independent	Abdul Rehman Bhat	3,756	43.57%	New
JKNC	Rafi Ahmad Mir	2,506	29.07%	▼5.98
JKAL	Mohammad Ashraf	1,168	13.55%	▲9.20
INC	Mohammad Abdullah Nadaf	542	6.29%	▼39.00
RJD	Gulam Nabi Shah	310	3.60%	New
AJKPPF	Ramzan Malik	205	2.38%	New
BJP	Mohammad Yousf Sofi	123	1.43%	▼1.52
Margin of victory		1,250	14.50%	▲4.27
Turnout		8,620	15.80%	▼18.54
Registered electors		54,547		▼15.60
Independent gain from INC		Swing	▼1.71	

=== Assembly Election 1996 ===
1996 Jammu and Kashmir Legislative Assembly election : Srigufwara–Bijbehara
Party	Candidate	Votes	%	±%
INC	Mehbooba Mufti	10,051	45.28%	New
JKNC	Abdul Gani Shah	7,780	35.05%	▼12.67
JKNPP	Mohammed Yusuf	1,405	6.33%	New
JD	Mohammed Abdullah Nadaf	1,203	5.42%	New
JKAL	Srinath	965	4.35%	New
BJP	Vidya Sagar	655	2.95%	New
AIIC(T)	Dwarkanath Raina	137	0.62%	New
Margin of victory		2,271	10.23%	▲9.95
Turnout		22,196	36.26%	▼46.03
Registered electors		64,626		▲47.40
INC gain from JKNC		Swing	▼2.44	

=== Assembly Election 1987 ===
1987 Jammu and Kashmir Legislative Assembly election : Srigufwara–Bijbehara
Party	Candidate	Votes	%	±%
JKNC	Abdul Gani Shah	16,818	47.72%	▼6.18
Independent	Mohammed Sultan	16,718	47.44%	New
Independent	Ghulam Mohammed Loan	1,580	4.48%	New
Margin of victory		100	0.28%	▼9.34
Turnout		35,242	83.06%	▼2.90
Registered electors		43,845		▲13.75
JKNC hold		Swing		

=== Assembly Election 1983 ===
1983 Jammu and Kashmir Legislative Assembly election : Srigufwara–Bijbehara
Party	Candidate	Votes	%	±%
JKNC	Abdul Gani Shah	17,303	53.90%	▼10.02
INC	Mufti Mohammad Syed	14,214	44.28%	▲12.12
JKNC	Ghulam Nabi Mir	454	1.41%	▼62.50
Margin of victory		3,089	9.62%	▼22.13
Turnout		32,100	86.09%	▲2.36
Registered electors		38,546		▲24.15
JKNC hold		Swing		

=== Assembly Election 1977 ===
1977 Jammu and Kashmir Legislative Assembly election : Srigufwara–Bijbehara
Party	Candidate	Votes	%	±%
JKNC	Abdul Gani Shah	16,059	63.92%	New
INC	Mufti Mohammed Sayeed	8,081	32.16%	▼40.85
JP	Ali Mohammed Majid	984	3.92%	New
Margin of victory		7,978	31.75%	▼14.28
Turnout		25,124	84.62%	▲13.10
Registered electors		31,048		▲7.51
JKNC gain from INC		Swing		

=== Assembly Election 1972 ===
1972 Jammu and Kashmir Legislative Assembly election : Srigufwara–Bijbehara
Party	Candidate	Votes	%	±%
INC	Saif Ud Din Dar	14,300	73.02%	New
JI	Mohammed Sultan	5,285	26.98%	New
Margin of victory		9,015	46.03%	
Turnout		19,585	69.81%	▲67.82
Registered electors		28,879		▲13.64
INC hold		Swing		

=== Assembly Election 1967 ===
1967 Jammu and Kashmir Legislative Assembly election : Srigufwara–Bijbehara
Party	Candidate	Votes	%	±%
INC	Mufti Mohammad Sayeed	Unopposed		
Registered electors		25,412		
INC win (new seat)				

== See also ==
- Bijbehara
- List of constituencies of Jammu and Kashmir Legislative Assembly
