= Veeri =

- Village
- Location in Jammu & Kashmir, India Veeri (India)
- Coordinates: 33.77°N 75.14°E
- Country: India
- Union Territory: Jammu & Kashmir
- Division: Kashmir
- District: Anantnag
- Tehsil: Bijbehara
- Elevation: 1,601 m (5,253 ft)

Population (2011)
  - Total: 2,164

Languages
  - Official: Kashmiri, Urdu, Hindi, Dogri, English
- Time zone: UTC+5:30 (IST)
- Pincode: 192124
- Telephone Code: 01932
- Vehicle registration: JK03
- Sex ratio: 937 ♂/♀

Veeri is a village in the jurisdiction of the tehsil Bijbehara in the Anantnag district in southern Kashmir Valley of Jammu and Kashmir, India.

== Geography ==
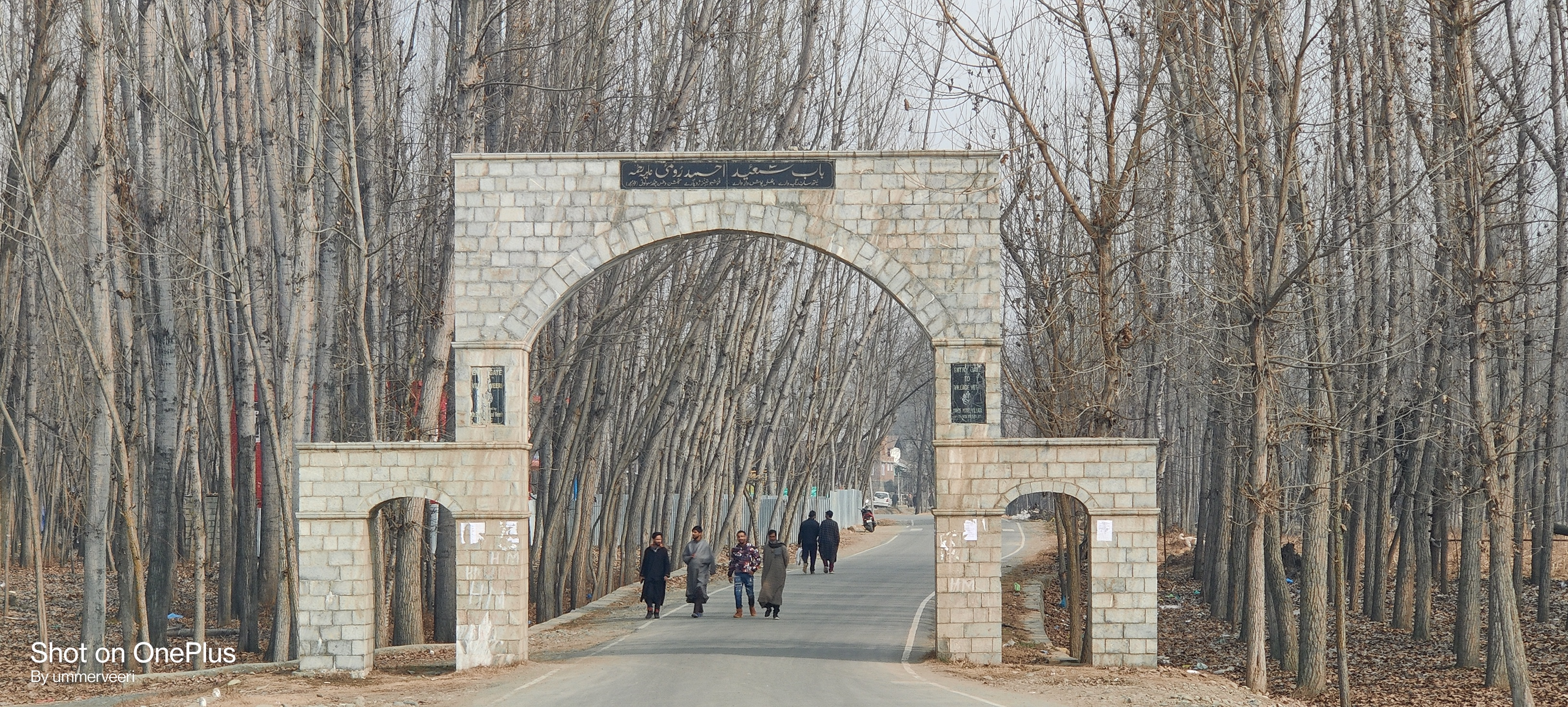

Veeri is located at an elevation of 5,300 feet (1,600 m) above the sea level. It is generally believed that the history of Veeri started with the advent of Hazrat Syed Ahmad Roomi (ra) in Veeri, in last decade of 14th century. Veeri is at a distance of 2 km from river Jhelum and 7 km to the north of Anantnag city. Bijbehara hometown is 5 km to the south, and Srinagar capital city is 56 km from Iqbal market Veeri.

== Demographics ==
At the 2011 census, the total population of Veeri was 2164, of whom 1065 were males and 1099 females.

== Notable people ==
- Bashir Ahmad Shah Veeri, Politician
- Shaykh Mushtaq Ah Veeri, Religious Scholar
- Ab Rehman Veeri, Politician
- Ab Gani Veeri, Politician
