= Iltija Mufti =

Indian politician (born 1987)

- Born: 1987 (age 38–39); Srinagar, Jammu and Kashmir, India
- Political party: Jammu and Kashmir People’s Democratic Party
- Parents: Javed Iqbal Shah (father); Mehbooba Mufti (mother)
- Relatives: Mufti Mohammad Syed (grandfather)

Iltija Mehbooba Mufti is an Indian politician from Jammu and Kashmir and the daughter of Mehbooba Mufti, the former chief minister of Jammu and Kashmir. She is the grand-daughter of Mufti Mohammad Sayeed, the founder of the Jammu and Kashmir People’s Democratic Party (PDP) who twice served as the Chief Minister of Jammu and Kashmir.

== Political career ==
Iltija stepped into the spotlight when her mother, Mehbooba Mufti, was detained in 2019 following the abrogation of Article 370 of the Constitution of India. During this time, Iltija managed her mother’s social media and spoke publicly about the situation in Kashmir, challenging the central government’s actions and highlighting human rights issues in the region.

She Lost The 2024 Legislative Assembly Election on her home seat Bijbehara thus marking PDP’s first loss at home after 22 years.

== Political views and advocacy ==
Iltija has consistently raised her voice against what she perceives as injustices in the region. In 2024 she had made comments about the potential role of the PDP as a ‘kingmaker’ in the upcoming assembly polls, which sparked some hope in the party's supporters, but the 2024 Jammu and Kashmir Legislative Assembly election results proved otherwise as her party Jammu and Kashmir People's Democratic Party won 3 seats, with Mufti herself losing her Bijbehara seat to the Jammu & Kashmir National Conference candidate Bashir Ahmad Shah Veeri by almost 10 thousand votes.
