= Kanelwan =

Coordinates: 33°47′38″N 75°09′47″E

Kanelwan is a village in Bijbehara tehsil in the Anantnag district of Jammu and Kashmir, India. The population was 3,822 in the 2011 Indian census.

== Education ==
PS Naidpora Kanelwan Bijbehara, a government primary school is located in Kanelwan. There is also a Government High School in this area.
