= Khiram =

Village in Jammu & Kashmir, India

Coordinates: 33.732°N 75.160°E

Khiram is a village in the Anantnag District in the Kashmir Valley of the Indian union territory of Jammu and Kashmir. It has a population of 9,160 (4,742 male (52%) and 4,418 female (48%)). The literacy rate is the village is 52%.

== Geography ==
Khiram is located approximately 25 kilometers from Anantnag City, the district town of Anantnag district, and 18 kilometers from Bijbehara. Khiram is connected by road to Anantnag City via routes through Brijbihari and Srigufwara, or through Sangam, Mahama, and Durhama. Additionally, Khiram is linked to the Bijbehara Pahalgam road and the National Highways of India through a road constructed in 2019.

Khiram is surrounded on three sides by mountains.

== Agriculture ==
Agriculture is the primary livelihood for the people of Khiram, with apple orchards being the backbone of the village's economy and cultural identity. The apple industry provides a year-round source of employment. Khiram Sirhama is planned to be Kashmir's first Model Apple Village.
