= Khush Roi Kalan =

Village in Jammu and Kashmir, India

- Village
- Location within Jammu and Kashmir Location within India
- Coordinates: 33°49′15″N 75°9′31″E
- Country: India
- Union Territory: Jammu & Kashmir
- Division: Kashmir
- District: Anantnag
- Tehsil: Srigufwara
- Village code: 003593

Population (2011)
  - Total: 2,547

Languages
  - Official: Kashmiri, Urdu, Hindi, Dogri, English
- Time zone: UTC+5:30 (IST)
- Postal code: 192124
- Vehicle registration: JK03

Khush Roi Kalan is a village in Srigufwara tehsil of Anantnag district in the Kashmir Valley of the Indian union territory of Jammu and Kashmir.

== Demographics ==
As of 2011 India census, Khush Roi Kalan had a population of 2547 in 410 households. Males constitute 50.9% of the population and females 49%. Kalan has an average literacy rate of 46.28%, lower than the national average of 74%, male literacy is 63.27%, and female literacy is 36.71%. In Khush Roi Kalan, 19.9% of the population is under 6 years of age.BRZAMAAN
