= Gantali Pora =

GantaliPora Gaentalpoor
- Location within Jammu and Kashmir Location within India
- Coordinates: 33.81°N 75.1°E
- Country: India
- State: Jammu and Kashmir
- District: Anantnag
- Tehsil: Bijbehara

Area
  - Total: 58.70 ha (145.1 acres)

Population (2011)
  - Total: 713

Languages
  - Official: Kashmiri, Urdu, Hindi, Dogri, English
- Time zone: IST(+5:30)
- Postal code: 192124

Gantali Pora is a village in Bijbehara tehsil, Anantnag district, of the Indian union territory of Jammu and Kashmir. As of 2011 the village had a population of 713 split into 80 households with males forming 353(49.5%) of the populace and females 360(51.5). Its elevation is approximately 890m above MSL. Kashmiri is mostly spoken while people also understand Urdu and Hindi.

== History ==
It is believed that long ago there was a temple in a nearby village which is still present there, the village is known as Thijiwara and temple was and is still famous by chota amarnath The hindu people used to come to the temple for prayers but they used to walk barefooted from Gantaliepora where they rang bell three times, which is the tradition of hindus. That was how Gantaliepora got its name because 'ganta' in Hindi means bell and 'pora' means piece of land.

== Geography ==
The village of Gantalipora is located at coordinates [[33.81°N 75.1°E]] . The village has alluvial type of soil which is very fertile as fields are flooded at least five times a decade by two local river streams. There are not so much apple orchards instead the soil is perfect for rice cultivation and mustard.

== Water ==
The village of Gantaliepora is covered by almost 14.5% of water. Two small rivers flow through it whose average widths are 9 ft (2.74 m) and 16 ft (4.87 m) respectively. Many small springs also generate from here and many water channels are also linked to fields for irrigation purposes.
