= Dachnipora =

- Town
- Location in Jammu and Kashmir, India Dachnipora (India)
- Coordinates: 33.584721°N 75.308601°E
- Country: India
- Union territory: Jammu and Kashmir
- District: Anantnag

Government
  - Type: Parliamentary
  - Body: Municipal

Languages
  - Official: Kashmiri, Urdu, Hindi, Dogri, English
- Time zone: UTC+5:30 (IST)
- PIN: 192194
- Vehicle registration: JK03

Dachnipora is a town and a notified area committee in Anantnag district of the Indian union territory of Jammu and Kashmir.
