= Hardu Toru =

Village in India

- Village
- Location in Jammu and Kashmir, India Hardu Toru (India)
- Coordinates: 33.7254°N 75.2536°E
- Country: India
- State: Jammu and Kashmir
- District: Anantnag district

Area
  - Total: 233.5 ha (577 acres)
- Elevation: 1,639 m (5,377 ft)

Population (2011)
  - Total: 3,398
  - Density: 1,455/km^{2} (3,769/sq mi)

Languages
  - Official: Kashmiri, Urdu, Hindi, Dogri, English
- Time zone: UTC+5:30 (IST)
- PIN: 192201
- Census code: 003673

Hardu Toru, commonly known as Toor, is a village in Anantnag tehsils in Anantnag district, Jammu and Kashmir, India. Hardu Toru village is located in Anantnag Tehsil of Anantnag district in Jammu & Kashmir. It is situated 17 km away from Anantnag.

== Demographics ==
According to the 2011 Census of India, Hardu Toru village has a total population of 3,398 people including 1,696 males and 1,702 females; and has a literacy rate of 61.57%.

Population	Total	Male	Female
Total Population	3,398	1,696	1,702
Literate Population	2,092	1,170	922
Illiterate Population	1,306	526	780
