= Gadiseer Bijbehara =

Gadiseer Bijbehara Gaedseer
- Village
- Gari Seer
- Location in Jammu and Kashmir, India Gadiseer Bijbehara (India)
- Coordinates: 33.80°N 75.10°E
- Country: India
- Union territory: Jammu and Kashmir
- District: Anantnag

Population (2011)
  - Total: 1,700

Languages
  - Official: Kashmiri, Urdu, Hindi, English
- Time zone: UTC+5:30 (IST)
- Postal code: 192124
- Vehicle registration: JK03

GadiseerBijbehara Gadiseer is a village in the Anantnag district in the Indian administered union territory of Jammu and Kashmir. It is located on the bank of Jhelum River (Veith- Vatasta). The village is under the jurisdiction of tehsil Bijbehara in Dachnipora Block.
