= Srigufwara =

Srigufwara Srigufwoar
- Town
- Location in Jammu and Kashmir, India Srigufwara (India)
- Coordinates: 33°48′57.80″N 75°12′45.70″E
- Country: India
- State: Jammu and Kashmir
- District: Anantnag
- Elevation: 1,684 m (5,525 ft)

Population (2011)
  - Total: 1,580

Languages
  - Official: Kashmiri, Urdu, Hindi, Dogri, English
- Time zone: UTC+5:30 (IST)
- PIN: 192401
- Telephone code: 01932
- Vehicle registration: JK-03

Srigufwara or Srigufwoar is a town and administrative sub-division, or tehsil, in the Anantnag district of the India-administered union territory of Jammu and Kashmir in the disputed Kashmir region. It was given tehsil status by the government of Jammu and Kashmir on 1 February 2014.

== Etymology ==
Srigufwara combines two roots: sri and gufwoar. The first root, sri, means 'sacred', and the second root, gufwoar, means 'place with a cave or secret'. This comes from the Kashmiri words gof (lit. 'cave') and woar (lit. 'place').

According to legend, a famous reshi meditated there in a cave in the 11th century when there was sparse human habitation. His secret communion with God resulted in his salvation. The place's name is believed to come from the saint's presence.

During Islamic rule, the town was called gofabal, again meaning 'place with a cave', from the words gof (lit. 'cave') and bal (lit. 'place').

== Location ==
Srigufwara is located on the banks of one of the only tributaries of the Lidder River, near several villages such as Khairbug, Poshkreedi, Darigund, and Hugam. It is 19 kilometres (12 mi) from the main city of Anantnag. An alternate route to the Pahalgam health resort en route to Amarnath Temple, a Hindu shrine dedicated to the god Shiva, passes through the town. It serves as a shortcut to travel to the resort. The drive is via apple valleys, vast landscapes and lush green fields. The seventh-century Martand Sun Temple on Martand plateau (Karewa), built by King Lalitaditya Muktapida of Kashmir, is 10 km from the town.

== New administrative unit ==
Local people and prominent political leaders had occasionally demanded tehsil status for the area. The decision to form new units was pending with the state government. On 1 February 2014, Srigufwara was given tehsil status in Anantnag District after the chief minister of Jammu and Kashmir Omar Abdullah agreed to a proposal to create new administrative units in the state. Srigufwara is one of 135 newly created tehsils after the state cabinet accepted the report submitted by the Cabinet Sub-Committee (CSC) headed by Jammu and Kashmir Deputy Chief Minister Tara Chand. The number of new administrative units recommended by the CSC was three times more than the 57 recommended by the Mushtaq Ganai Committee constituted by the Abdullah government.

Srigufwara acts as a center for more than 100 revenue villages, which cover its catchment area and benefit largely. Srigufwara is one of the few fast-evolving towns of south Kashmir with an important role in rural economic distribution, development & activity.

== Geography ==
Srigufwara is located at an elevation of 1,684 metres (5,525 ft) above sea level. The Lidder river passes through the town, flowing in a swift narrow stream from Sheshnag Lake to the east of Pahalgam and passing through many villages. The area has many small canals of different lengths. The Mahind and Dadi canals serve irrigation purposes in the area. The Dadi Canal initially covered less area, but after remodeling the tail-end irrigation was extended to 3,500 acres.

The Dadi Canal takes water from the Lidder river at Kathsu near Chatapura. It is 19 km long and irrigates about 8000 acres of land in Sakhras, Loiseer, Viddy, Darigund, Khiram, Bichhanpura, and Sirhama. The Mahind Canal, constructed in 1956, also takes water from the Lidder near Sakhras. It is 16 km long and irrigates about 2500 acres of land.

The area has deciduous vegetation and is abundant in coniferous forests including species like fir (Abies spectabilis), silver fir (Abies pindrow), kail (Pinus wallichiana), chir (Pinus roxburghii) and deodar (Cedrus deodara). There are numerous old chinar trees in the area, particularly on roadsides. Other trees include willows and poplars. The forest provides timber while grassy meadows in the forest provide fodder for cattle. Medicinal herbs such as digitalis, menthol, artemisia and belladonna are also found in the forests.

The soils are loamy with little clay or lime content but with a high amount of magnesia. Chemical fertilization, green manure, and legumes are used before cultivation. The alluvium has sufficient organic matter and nitrogen content because of plant residue, crop stubble, natural vegetation, and animal excretion. Soil types include gurti (clay), bahil (loam), and sekil (sandy). Fruit cultivation is predominant on the slopes, while paddy cultivation is common in the plains.

The area has a temperate climate as the Pir Panjal Range of the minor Himalayas surrounds it. In winter snowfall is heavier and the temperature is relatively low. Due to the presence of mountains, monsoons have a negligible effect on the area. The rainfall is often excessive in spring, moderate in summer, low in autumn and moderate in winter. In winters, the temperature may fall to −5 °C (23 °F) and in summers, the peak temperature is 37 °C (99 °F). Heavy rains and snowfall in winter threaten the residential buildings in the area, which sometimes results in their collapse.

== Flora and fauna ==
=== Flora ===
Apple and walnut are the prominent fruits grown in the area. Apple season starts mid from-September and people sell the produce across various fruit markets in India, especially the Jammu fruit market in the state itself. Apple pulp and juice are extracted for the production of jams and jellies.

There are different varieties of apples grown, such as the ambri Kashmir (amri), American trail (American apirogue), delicious (Red Delicious), maharaji (white dotted red), hazaratbali (benoni), and kesri (Cox's Orange Pippin). Other fruits like pears, cherries, plums, peaches, apricots, and almonds are also grown. The fruits are mostly cultivated for economic purposes and little for local consumption. The supply of machinery, equipment and technical advice to the fruit growers by the state government has greatly helped fruit cultivation. The training of gardeners has also made the fruit industry more efficient. The central shrubs include Indigofera heterantha, Viburnum, and Sorbaria tomentosa. Ground cover is very rich and dicotyledonous herbs dominate, such as Rumex patientia, Primula, and Anemone.

=== Fauna ===
The local forests are the abode of black bears, brown bears, leopards, rhesus macaques, grey langurs, Himalayan mice, hares and ravens.

== Overa Biosphere Reserve ==
The Overa-Aru Biosphere Reserve is 20 km from the main town on the Overa side. It has the status of a wildlife sanctuary, and contains several rare and endangered species like the hangul, musk deer, brown bear, leopard, Koklass pheasant, monal, and snowcock.

== Economy ==
Agriculture and business are the main industries. The area is one of the major fruit producers in Kashmir.

During earlier times, people used to obtain silk from silk worms, which feed on mulberry trees. Pure silk was obtained from silk cocoons by rough means without any technical expertise. The practice of silk production is nonexistent now, and people are more engaged with apples and other business activities. Srigufwara is one of the towns in south Kashmir which is developing at a fast pace in all aspects.

== Transport ==
The town has well-formed two lane road connectivity with National Highway 1A which is 10 km away from the town. During summers the number of tourist vehicles increases considerably, boosting the local economy. Major portions of pilgrims to Amarnath Temple also pass through the area.

== Demographics ==
The population of Srigufwara mostly consists of Muslims belonging to the Kashmiri ethnic group, who are believed to have migrated from Central Asia and Afghanistan.

The Gurjar (or Gujjar) and Bakarwal (or Bakerwal) groups are also present in the upper area. These groups of people come from Rajouri and other areas of Jammu during the summer. Often, they have nomadic lifestyles and keep flocks and cattle for their livelihoods. Most of the Gujjar are permanent settlers, while many Bakarwals stay in and around the area prior to their journeys to the southern slopes of the Siwaliks and to the margs, alpine pastures of the central Himalayas.

== Shrine of Zain-ud-Din Wali ==
The shrine of Sheikh Zain-ud-Din Wali who lived in the 15th century is in the town. Zain-ud-Din was the disciple of Sheikh Noor-ud-din Wali, the leading Reshi of Kashmir. Various shrines are attributed to Zain-ud-Din, including a shrine on a hillock in Athmakam about 20 km from Pahalgam. However, the shrine in Srigufwara is important in the local belief that Zain-ud-Din achieved spiritual perfection here.

It is commonly known in Kashmir that Zain-ud-Din, who was known as Zia Singh before his conversion to Islam, was a prince and belonged to the ruling Rajas of Kishtwar. His father Yesh Singh, the Kishtwar ruler, is said to have been assassinated when Zia was only 13 years old. Zia is believed to have been suffering from some disease. When Noor-ud-din passed through Kishtwar, Zia's mother, knowing him to be a spiritual healer, urged him to cure her son. Sheikh agreed and said that Zia must promise to meet him in Kashmir. However, after Zia's cure he forgot the promise and again was bedridden. Remembering the promise, mother and son journeyed to meet Noor-ud-din at Bumzuva. There, Zia and his mother embraced Islam under the names Zain-ud-Din and Zoon Ded, respectively.

The exact date of Zain-ud-Din's death is unknown, but his urs (death anniversary) is celebrated on the 13th day of Basakhi corresponding to 25 April. A torchlight procession, locally known as Zool (illumination), is held in the evenings during the festival. Pieces of forest wood, especially deodar, are tied to long wooden sticks and burnt. People of all ages participate in such processions. There is no restriction to entry into the shrine.

== Government and politics ==
Srigufwara is a major area of political interest in Anantnag. Political leaders organize rallies in the area on different occasions. Addressing a rally on 28 April 2013 on the premises of Higher Secondary School Srigufwara, People's Democratic Party's Mufti Mohammad Sayeed said that Jammu and Kashmir will become the most developed state in the region if it gets a visionary political road map and efficient governance. Senior All Parties Hurriyat Conference leader Shabir Ahmed Shah and his companions Zahoor Ahmed Shairkh and Nazir Ahmed were arrested by Indian police on 7 July 2007 and detained in Srigufwara. On 5 September 2010 Deputy Inspector General of Police for South Kashmir Range S. A. Watali presided over the public police meeting in which grievances related to PHE, Food and Supplies, and other similar departments were addressed.

== Human rights ==
Srigufwara has occasionally witnessed protests against human rights violations in the area and across the valley. In the earlier days of militancy in Kashmir, an Indian Border Security Force camp was located in the town, which was later replaced by Rashtriya Rifles (RR) forces. A Central Reserve Police Force camp is still functional in the area. An eidgah, under military occupation, was also opened to the public after 20 years of military occupation. In another incident, school headmaster Sanaullah Ganai of Bijbehara was taken by nine RR para-commandos of the camp and his relatives were not given access to him. In 1996, during the heyday of militancy in Kashmir, people who were reluctant to vote were forced to vote in elections by Indian forces.

== Education ==
The main area of Srigufwara has a total of ten schools, of which six are government and four are private. Among the government schools, there are three primary, two middle, and one higher secondary, while among private schools, one is middle and three are high schools. Schools in the area include:

- Government Model Higher Secondary School Srigufwara
- Iqra English Medium High School Viddy
- Al-Aman Secondary School Srigufwara
- National Institute of Creative Education (NICE)
- Qurat-ul-Ain English Medium School Srigufwara
