= Krewa Rampur =

Village in India

Krewa Rampur Krew Rampur
- Village
- Location in Jammu and Kashmir, India Krewa Rampur (India)
- Coordinates: 33.7394°N 75.1997°E
- Country: India
- State: Jammu and Kashmir
- District: Anantnag district

Area
  - Total: 169.2 ha (418 acres)

Population (2011)
  - Total: 2,116
  - Density: 1,251/km^{2} (3,239/sq mi)

Languages
  - Official: Kashmiri, Urdu, Hindi, Dogri, English
- Time zone: UTC+5:30 (IST)
- PIN: 192101
- Census code: 003666

Krewa Rampur is a village in Anantnag tehsil in Anantnag district, Jammu and Kashmir, India. Krewa Rampur village is located in Anantnag Tehsil of Anantnag district in Jammu & Kashmir. It is situated 10 km away from Anantnag.

== Demographics ==
According to the 2011 Census of India, Krewa Rampur village has a total population of 2,116 people including 1,139 males and 977 females; and has a literacy rate of 56.19%.

Population	Total	Male	Female
Total Population	2,116	1,139	977
Literate Population	1,189	727	462
Illiterate Population	927	412	515
