= Mahind =

Village in India

Coordinates: 33°49′29″N 75°10′7″E

Mahind a small village located in Srigufwara a Tehsil of Anantnag district, Jammu and Kashmir, India. 345 families live there as of the 2011 census. The total population is 2208 of which 1102 are males and 1106 are females.

Mahind has a lower literacy rate when compared to Jammu and Kashmir: 61.34% compared to 67.16% of Jammu and Kashmir. The male literacy rate is 76.19%, and female is 46.72%.

Nearby villages are Khoushroy Kalan, Now Shehra, Sirhama, and Hattigam.

== Work profile ==
In Mahind, 878 people were employed as of the 2011 census. 54.33% described their work as "Main Work", meaning employment for more than 6 Months, while 45.67% described their work as Marginal (less than 6 months). Of the 878 workers, 287 were cultivators and 12 were agricultural labourer.

The educational needs of the village are served by Sir Syed Memorial High School and a higher secondary school, along with many lower grade schools. These schools have played an important role in promoting the education in the whole area. The whole village is prosperous and the people living there are well off thanks to the horticulture industry.

The village is divided in two parts, Herpora and Bonpora. Many Hindu families were living here until 1990. After that, they migrated to different parts of India when the insurgency broke out.

The village has a good water supply system that provides clean drinking water to the residents of Mahind and neighbouring villages.

The village has been provided with a business unit of J&K Bank for meeting the banking needs of the people of the village and the nearby villages.
