= Tail Wani =

Village in Jammu and Kashmir, India

Tail Wani Tail Weain Tailwani
- Village
- Location in Jammu and Kashmir, India Tail Wani (India)
- Coordinates: 33.7101°N 75.2399°E
- Country: India
- State: Jammu and Kashmir
- District: Anantnag district

Area
  - Total: 244.4 ha (604 acres)
- Elevation: 1,639 m (5,377 ft)

Population (2011)
  - Total: 4,840
  - Density: 1,980/km^{2} (5,130/sq mi)

Languages
  - Official: Kashmiri, Urdu, Hindi, Dogri, English
- Time zone: UTC+5:30 (IST)
- PIN: 192201
- Census code: 003676

Tail Wani, commonly known as Tailweain, is a village in Anantnag tehsils in Anantnag district, Jammu and Kashmir, India. Tail Wani village is located in Anantnag Tehsil of Anantnag district in Jammu & Kashmir. It is situated 17 km away from Anantnag.

== Demographics ==
According to the 2011 Census of India, Tail Wani village has a total population of 4,840 people including 2,431 males and 2,409 females; and has a literacy rate of 52.44%.

Populations	Total	Male	Female
Total Population	4,840	2,431	2,409
Literate Population	2,538	1,446	1,092
Illiterate Population	2,302	985	1,317
