= Bon Dialgam =

Village in Anantnag, India

- Village
- Location in India Bon Dialgam (India)
- Coordinates: 33.699172°N 75.158908°E
- Country: India
- Union Territory: Jammu & Kashmir
- Division: Kashmir
- District: Anantnag

Languages
  - Official: Kashmiri, Urdu, Hindi, Dogri, English
- Time zone: UTC+5:30 (IST)
- Postal code: 192210
- Vehicle registration: JK03

Bon Dialgam (also spelled as Bonadialgam) is a village in the Anantnag tehsil of Anantnag district in the Kashmir Valley of the Indian union territory of Jammu and Kashmir.

== About Bona Dialgam ==
According to Census 2011 information the location code or village code of Bona Dialgam village is 003729. Bona Dialgam village is located in Anantnag Tehsil of Anantnag district in Jammu & Kashmir, India. Anantnag is nearest town to Bona Dialgam village.
