= Mehbooba Mufti =

Former Chief minister of Jammu and Kashmir

Mehbooba Mufti Sayed
- Mufti in 2022

President of Jammu and Kashmir Peoples Democratic Party
- Incumbent
- Assumed office January 2009

9th Chief Minister of Jammu & Kashmir
- In office 4 April 2016 – 19 June 2018
- Governor: Narinder Nath Vohra; Satyapal Malik
- Preceded by: Mufti Mohammad Sayeed
- Succeeded by: President's rule (Note: Omar Abdullah as Chief Minister of the Union territory of Jammu and Kashmir. The Assembly was dissolved in 2018 followed by the abrogation of Articles 370 and 35A, which made the state into a UT and elections conducted in 2024.)

Member of Parliament, Lok Sabha
- In office 2014–2016
- Preceded by: Mirza Mehboob Beg
- Succeeded by: Hasnain Masoodi
- Constituency: Anantnag
- In office 16 May 2004 – 16 May 2009
- Preceded by: Ali Muhammad Naik
- Succeeded by: Mirza Mehboob Beg

LoP in Jammu & Kashmir Assembly
- Chief Minister: Farooq Abdullah

Personal details
- Born: 22 May 1959 (age 67) Bijbehara, Jammu and Kashmir, India
- Party: Jammu and Kashmir People's Democratic Party
- Spouse: Javed Iqbal Shah
- Children: Iltija Mufti, Irtiqa Mufti
- Parent: Mufti Mohammad Sayeed (father)
- Education: University of Kashmir

Mehbooba Mufti Sayed (born 22 May 1959) is an Indian politician and leader of the Jammu and Kashmir People's Democratic Party (PDP). She served as the 9th chief minister of the erstwhile state Jammu and Kashmir from 4 April 2016 to 19 June 2018.

Mufti was the first woman to hold the office of chief minister in the Jammu and Kashmir. She formed a coalition government in Jammu and Kashmir jointly with the Bharatiya Janata Party (BJP). The coalition was termed as "Himalayan blunder" by the Indian National Congress. She resigned in June 2018 after the BJP withdrew from the coalition.

Mufti was the president of the PDP and was a member of the Indian parliament, representing Anantnag in the 16th Lok Sabha before she was sworn in as the chief minister of the Jammu and Kashmir. She also represented Anantnag in the 14th Lok Sabha (2004–09) and has also been a Leader of Opposition in Jammu and Kashmir Legislative Assembly.

== Early life and career ==
She is the daughter of Mufti Mohammad Sayeed and Gulshan Ara, born in 1959 in Akhran Nowpora, J&K, India. She graduated in English literature from Government College for Women in Jammu, and obtained a law degree from the University of Kashmir. After 1989, she moved to New Delhi where she worked at the Bombay Mercantile bank and later at East West Airlines, before moving back to J&K. Mehbooba Mufti married Javed Iqbal Shah, who is the cousin of her father, in 1984. However, the couple later divorced. Shah is a political analyst and animal-rights activist. They have two daughters, Iltija and Irtiqa.

== Political career ==
When elections for the state assembly were held in 1996, Mehbooba became one of the most popular members elected from Bijbehara on an Indian National Congress ticket. Her father had returned to the Congress, which he had left in 1987, angry at the alliance that party had formed with its traditional rival in the state, the National Conference. She later served as the leader of the opposition in the assembly, taking on the government of chief minister Farooq Abdullah with asperity.

She resigned her assembly seat and went on to contest the parliamentary elections in 1999 from Srinagar, where she lost to incumbent member Omar Abdullah. She won the Pahalgam seat in the state assembly from South Kashmir, defeating Rafi Ahmed Mir, when assembly elections were held again in 2002. She was elected to the Lok Sabha from Anantnag seat in 2004 and 2014. She defeated Mirza Mehboob Beg who was the incumbent MP in 2014 Lok Sabha Elections.

After her father's death in January 2016, when he was heading the coalition government in Jammu and Kashmir, she took forward the same alliance with Bhartiya Janata Party (BJP), the second time the BJP and the PDP formed a government in Jammu and Kashmir. On 4 April 2016, she took the oath and became the first woman Chief Minister of Jammu and Kashmir.

On 25 June 2016, she won an Assembly seat in a by-election in Anantnag with the highest margin in any recent elections there and thereafter focussed on settling of Rohingyas.

On 19 June 2018, she resigned as chief minister of Kashmir. Her government had been an alliance between the Peoples' Democratic Party (PDP) and the BJP, but there was a rift in the alliance in February 2018, when two BJP ministers expressed public support for a man who was alleged to have raped and killed an eight-year-old girl in Kathua District. The BJP's National General Secretary, Ram Madhav, announced the end of the alliance between the BJP and the PDP, and said that it was because of the deteriorating security situation. Mehbooba and the state government had tried suspending security operations for Ramadan, but the militants had not reciprocated, and 30 people were killed during the ceasefire. So the BJP withdrew from the alliance with the PDP so that the Indian government could get tough with the militants. When the alliance between the PDP and the BJP ended, Mehbooba resigned as chief minister. Mehbooba said "the muscular policy will not work in Kashmir".

She contested 2019 Lok Sabha elections from Anantnag seat but lost it to Hasnain Masoodi of National Conference, and later also lost the 2024 Lok Sabha elections from Anantanag - Rajouri seat to Mian Altaf Ahmed Larvi of National Conference with 2.3 lakh votes.

== Political positions ==
=== Talks with Pakistan and Hurriyat ===
In September 2015, speaking as PDP president, Mufti said that the All Parties Hurriyat Conference could take part in a political process but not in NSA-level talks between India and Pakistan. She said that cancellation of dialogue between the two countries was not in interest of the people of Kashmir. In 2026 she welcomed remarks from RSS leadership for supporting dialogue with Pakistan.

=== Article 370 and the flag ===
On October 2020, after her release from detention Mufti said that she will not raise the Indian flag until the former flag of Jammu and Kashmir was restored. Union Minister Ravi Shankar Prasad said the remark showed "serious disrespect to the very image of India". The J&K BJP president Ravinder Raina called for her to be booked for sedition.

=== Militancy and terrorism ===
On July 28, 2016 as Chief Minister, she told the reporters that she would have given Burhan Wani, an Islamic terrorist responsible for several terrorist attacks on Indian security forces and civilians; a chance had she known he was the encounter site. She said that army and the police had told her only three militants were inside the house. The National Conference's provincial president called the remarks "doublespeak" and an Additional DGP said that she had been aware of the specificities of the operation.

== Detention ==
On 5 August 2019, Mufti was detained under the Jammu and Kashmir Public Safety Act when the central government abrogated the Jammu and Kashmir's special status. Her daughter Iltija Mufti took over her mother's X (formerly Twitter) account on the 46th day of detention. In November, Iltija Mufti wrote a letter to the Srinagar Deputy Commissioner to shift her mother to a place better equipped for the valley's winter.

In February 2020 she was further detained under the Jammu and Kashmir Public Safety Act. She was released on 13 October 2020.

On 25 November 2020, Mufti was again detained by Jammu and Kashmir Police and was not allowed to visit South Kashmir's Pulwama to meet the family of senior PDP leader Waheed Para, who was arrested by the National Investigation Agency earlier that week.

Mufti said that her daughter Iltija Mufti has also been placed under house arrest.

== Electoral history ==
Mehbooba Mufti has contested 8 elections - 4 Assembly (all won) and 4 Lok Sabha (2 won, 2 lost).

=== Legislative Assembly (Vidhan Sabha) ===
Year	Constituency	Party	Result	Votes / Remarks
1996	Bijbehara	INC	Won	First win as Congress candidate from home segment
2002	Pahalgam	PDP	Won	Won Pahalgam, PDP won 16 seats
2008	Wachi	PDP	Won	Elected from Wachi, Shopian
2016 (By-poll 25 June)	Anantnag	PDP	Won	4th term, won by 12,000+ votes, became first woman CM

=== Parliament (Lok Sabha) ===
Year	Constituency	Party	Result	Opponent
1999	Srinagar	PDP	Lost	Omar Abdullah (NC)
2004	Anantnag	PDP	Won	First Lok Sabha win
2014	Anantnag	PDP	Won	Second Lok Sabha win
2019	Anantnag	PDP	Lost	Hasnain Masoodi (NC)
2024	Anantnag–Rajouri	PDP	Lost	Mian Altaf Ahmed Larvi (NC)

== See also ==
- Mehbooba Mufti ministry (2016–2018)

== Notes ==
Lok Sabha
Preceded by Ali Mohammed Naik	Member of Parliament for Anantnag; 2004–2009	Succeeded by Mirza Mehboob Beg
Preceded by Mirza Mehboob Beg	Member of Parliament for Anantnag; 2014–17	Succeeded by Hasnain Masoodi
Political offices
Preceded by Vacant (Presidents Rule)	Chief Minister of Jammu and Kashmir; 4 April 2016 – 19 June 2018	Succeeded by Vacant (Presidents Rule)
Party political offices
Preceded by Vacant	Leader of the Jammu and Kashmir People's Democratic Party in the 16th Lok Sabha; 2014 – 4 April 2016	Succeeded by Muzaffar Hussain Baig
