= Javed Ahmad Tak =

Indian social worker

Javed Ahmed Tak is an Indian social worker. He has got Padma Shri in 2020 for his contribution in social work.

== Early life and education ==
Tak is from Jammu and Kashmir. He did diploma in Human Rights and Computer Application from IGNOU. He has also done D.E.D.

== Career ==
Javed established the Humanity Welfare Organization, which helps under privilege women by providing medical assistance. He has also founded an educational institution in Bijbehara named Zaiba Aapa Institute of Inclusive Education which provides free education to children with special need of the Union Territory of Jammu and Kashmir. In 2020, he got Padma Shri for his contribution in social work.

== Awards ==
- Padma Shri (2020)
