= Parvez Rasool =

Indian cricketer

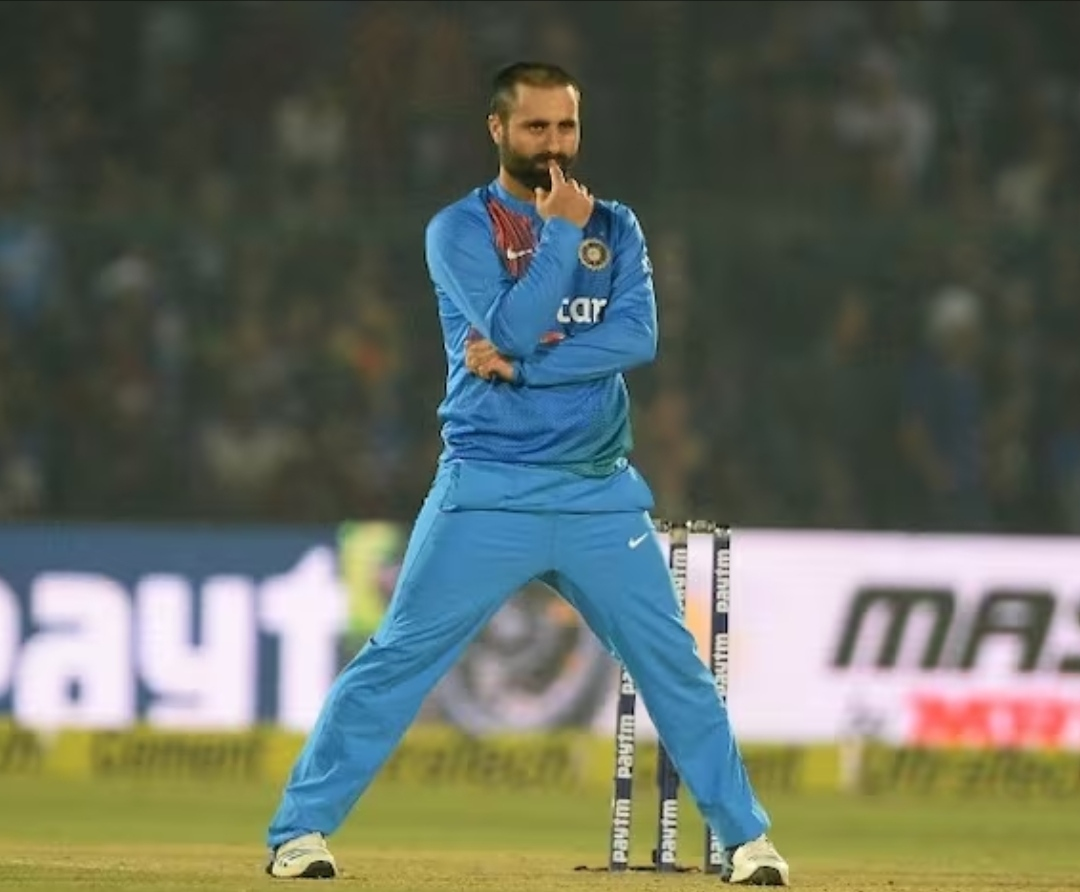
- Parvez Rasool in 2017

Personal information
- Full name: Parvez Rasool
- Born: 13 February 1989 (age 37); Bijbehara, Jammu and Kashmir, India
- Batting: Right-handed
- Bowling: Right-arm off break
- Role: All-rounder

International information
- National side: India (2014–2017)
- Only ODI (cap 18): 15 June 2014 v Bangladesh
- ODI shirt no.: 18
- Only T20I (cap 67): 26 January 2017 v England
- T20I shirt no.: 72

Domestic team information
- Years: Team
- 2008/09–2022/23: Jammu and Kashmir
- 2013: Pune Warriors India (squad no. 21)
- 2014–2015: Sunrisers Hyderabad (squad no. 21)
- 2016: Royal Challengers Bangalore (squad no. 1)
- 2017–2018/19: Gazi Group Cricketers
- 2021/22–2022/23: Dhanmondi Sports Club
- 2022/23–2023/24: Badureliya Sports Club

Career statistics
Competition	ODI	T20I	FC	LA
Matches	1	1	95	164
Runs scored	–	5	5,648	3,982
Batting average	–	5.00	38.95	33.46
100s/50s	–	0/0	16/22	1/32
Top score	–	5	182	118*
Balls bowled	60	24	19,980	8,539
Wickets	2	1	352	221
Bowling average	30.00	32.0	27.21	27.58
5 wickets in innings	0	0	23	3
10 wickets in match	0	0	5	0
Best bowling	2/60	1/32	8/85	6/45
Catches/stumpings	0/–	0/–	53/–	42/–
- Source: ESPNcricinfo, 21 October 2025

Parvez Rasool (born 13 February 1989) is an Indian former cricketer hailing from Bijbehara township of south Kashmir's Anantnag District, who played as an all-rounder for Jammu and Kashmir. A right-hand batsman and offbreak bowler, Rasool was the captain of the Jammu and Kashmir team and a regular member of India A. He was bought for ₹95 lakh (US$100,000) by the Sunrisers Hyderabad in the 2014 IPL auction. Rasool was the second cricketer after Mithun Manhas from Jammu and Kashmir to have played in the IPL and the first from the state to play for the Indian National Team in ODI's and T20I's. He played only 1 T20I and 1 ODI in his international career.

Rasool received his maiden call-up for the national team in 2013 for the Zimbabwe tour. Rasool finally represented the national team against Bangladesh on 15 June 2014 at Mirpur. Parvez Rasool got his first chance to play his maiden T20 against England in 2017 where he dismissed Eoin Morgan and got his first T20 International wicket and his bowling figures were 1/32 in 4 overs.

== Early life ==
Rasool is from Bijbehara, in Anantnag district of Kashmir, India. He was coached by Abdul Qayoom, a former first class cricketer for Jammu and Kashmir before playing for Jammu and Kashmir. Rasool's father, Ghulam Rasool, and brother, Asif Rasool, have also played competitive cricket.

== Domestic career ==
In the 2012–13 Ranji season, Rasool scored 594 runs from 7 matches at an average of 54 including two centuries, and took 33 wickets at an average of 18 with three five-wicket hauls. His impressive performance was rewarded as he was included in the India A squad to play the warm-up one-day match against England on 6 January 2013. With this, he became the first cricketer from the Kashmir Valley to be picked for India 'A'.

In February 2013, Rasool wreaked havoc in his three spells as he took 7 wickets which helped Board President's XI bowl out the visiting Australian team for a modest 241 and scored winning 36* runs. His seven scalps included top-order batsmen such as regular Test opener Ed Cowan, stand-in captain and wicketkeeper Matthew Wade and future Australian cricket captain Steve Smith.

In February 2013, Rasool joined the Pune Warriors. He made his IPL debut on 9 May 2013 against the Kolkata Knight Riders at Pune. He got the wicket of Jacques Kallis and finished with figures of 1/23 off 4 overs in that match. He played his next IPL match against the Mumbai Indians on 11 May in which he scored 4 not out and bowled one over conceding five runs.

In 2013–14 Ranji Trophy, Rasool scored 663 runs with two centuries and three half-centuries at an average of 51 and took 27 wickets with two 5 wicket hauls in 9 matches. Under Rasool's captaincy, Jammu and Kashmir made it to the quarterfinals that season for the first time since 2000.

He was bought by Sunrisers Hyderabad at the 2014 IPL auction for ₹95 lakh (US$100,000). He played 3 matches in IPL 2014. In his first match of 2014 IPL he took the wicket of Yuvraj Singh and bowled his spell nicely to likes of Gayle, Kohli and de Villiers, restricting them to concede minimum runs.

He was awarded with Lala Amarnath award for best all-rounder in domestic circuit after his performance in the 2013-14 Ranji Trophy season.

During the 2016–17 Ranji Trophy, he scored 629 runs in 9 matches that included 7 half centuries highest being 92 and took 38 wickets with 3 five wicket hauls, placing him 5th in highest wicket takers of the season.

In November 2017, he took his tenth five-wicket haul in first-class cricket, bowling for Jammu and Kashmir against Kerala in the 2017–18 Ranji Trophy. He was the leading wicket-taker for Jammu and Kashmir in the 2017–18 Ranji Trophy, with 28 dismissals in six matches.

In July 2018, he was named in the squad for India Red for the 2018–19 Duleep Trophy. He was the leading wicket-taker for India Red in the tournament, with eleven dismissals in two matches.

On 3 October 2018, Parvez Rasool became first cricketer from Jammu and Kashmir to play 100 List-A Matches. The current Jammu and Kashmir captain, is first cricketer from State to play 100 List-A matches. He reached to milestone in Vijay Hazare Trophy match against Rajasthan. In 100 matches he has taken 115 wickets and has scored 2366 runs.

He was the leading run-scorer for Jammu & Kashmir in the 2018–19 Ranji Trophy, with 684 runs in nine matches. He was also the leading wicket-taker for the team, with 35 dismissals. During the match against Services at Palam in Elite Group C, Rasool became only the fourth Indian cricketer to score a hundred and take eight wickets in an innings of a first-class match, with career-best figures of 8/85, and scoring 115.

== International career ==
Rasool got his maiden call-up for the national team in 2013 for the Zimbabwe tour. He became the third Kashmiri cricketer after Vivek Razdan and Suresh Raina to get selected for the national team, but did not play any game on that tour.

Rasool finally represented India against Bangladesh in June 2014 at Mirpur where he picked up two wickets for 60 in 10 overs. His next inclusion in the team came in January 2017 for the T20I series at home against England after two regular spinners Ravichandran Ashwin and Ravindra Jadeja were rested. Parveez represented India against England in January 2017 at Kanpur where he picked up one wicket for 1 in 4 overs. He also scored 5 runs with the bat.

== Personal life ==
In August 2017, Rasool married a girl from Ranipora, a village that falls on the Srinagar-Shopian highway, in Shopian district. His wife is a student of University of Kashmir and she completed her post Graduation from the same in Arabic.

== Controversy ==
During his tenure as Jammu & Kashmir Cricket Association (JKCA) Chairman in 2021, Mithun Manhas, now the Chairman of Board of Control for Cricket in India had issued notice to Rasool, asking him to return a cricket roller allegedly taken by him. Rasool strongly denied this, saying that he was being victimised. The matter went on for quite some time, before getting quiet.
