= Abdul Qayoom (cricketer) =

Indian cricketer

Personal information
- Full name: Abdul Qayoom Bagaw
- Born: 2 March 1967 (age 59); Anantnag, Jammu and Kashmir, India
- Batting: Right-handed
- Bowling: Right-arm fast-medium
- Role: Bowler

Domestic team information
- Years: Team
- 1985/86–2002/03: Jammu and Kashmir

Career statistics
Competition	FC	List A
Matches	47	25
Runs scored	796	170
Batting average	11.21	9.44
100s/50s	0/0	0/0
Top score	46	34*
Balls bowled	8,563	1,273
Wickets	152	31
Bowling average	30.67	32.67
5 wickets in innings	11	0
10 wickets in match	2	n/a
Best bowling	7/57	4/24
Catches/stumpings	17/–	10/–
- Source: ESPNcricinfo, 9 February 2016

Abdul Qayoom Bagaw (born 2 March 1967) is an Indian former first-class cricketer who played for Jammu and Kashmir. Qayoom was regarded as the finest fast bowler from Jammu and Kashmir. He worked as a coach for the state association after his playing career.

== Life and career ==
Qayoom started playing cricket as a wicket-keeper, before he became a fast bowler in 1982–83. He was a science graduate from the Bijbehara Degree College who later worked for Air India. He played for Air India cricket team and made his first-class debut for Jammu and Kashmir in 1985/86. In the 1989–90 Ranji Trophy, he was the third-highest wicket-taker of the tournament with 29 scalps. He made his List A debut for Wills XI in the Wills Trophy in 1990. He became captain of Jammu and Kashmir for the first time in 1993, and for the second time in 2000–01 when he led the team to its first-ever Ranji quarterfinal. He was one of the eight fast bowlers from the country to have trained at the MRF Pace Foundation Camp in 1994 under the mentorship of Dennis Lillee. He retired from cricket in 2003.

Qayoom was known for his pace and bounce as well as his ability to swing the ball and bowl "toe crushers". He was regarded as the "poster boy" of Jammu and Kashmir cricket and the finest fast bowler from the state. He became the first player from Kashmir Valley to be picked for a national-level squad when he played in the Wills Trophy.

Qayoom became a cricket coach soon after retirement. He was made the head coach of Jammu and Kashmir Ranji and under-19 teams for the 2004–05 season. He was appointed as assistant coach of Jammu and Kashmir in 2012–13, with Bishen Singh Bedi as the head coach. In 2013–14 Qayoom took over as the head coach and the team made it to the Ranji quarterfinals for a second time. He has been the mentor and coach of Parvez Rasool from his early days.
