= Hugam =

Village in Jammu and Kashmir, India

Hugam is a village located in Anantnag district of Jammu and Kashmir, India. It is situated 12 km away from the main town of Anantnag. The village is very well known for its highly educated culture and environment of co-existence and harmony. Located on the east side of a tributary of the Lidder river locally called "Aedvin". It is surrounded by neighbouring villages like Khairbug, Poshkreedi, Darigund and Adlash, the village is well connected with other suburban and urban areas by sufficient local transport services.

== Demographics ==
According to the 2011 Census of India, Hugam is 246.5 hectares in area, with 1770 people in about 311 houses. Kashmiri is the major language, while Urdu, Hindi and English are also spoken.

The inhabitants of this village include both Muslims and Hindus. There are currently two middle schools, two primary schools and a high school. The people are mainly engaged into the business of agriculture and horticulture apart from working in various other professions of public, private and government sectors.
