= Durhama =

Durhama Durhoam
- Village
- Location in Jammu and Kashmir, India Durhama (India)
- Coordinates: 33.62°N 74.87°E
- Country: India
- Union territory: Jammu and Kashmir
- District: Baramulla

Languages
  - Official: Kashmiri, Urdu, Hindi, Dogri, English
- Time zone: UTC+5:30 (IST)
- PIN: 193109

Durhama or Durhoam is a small village in Baramulla district in the Indian union territory of Jammu and Kashmir. It is about 20 km from district headquarters Baramulla, 13 km from the apple town Sopore and 50 km from Batmaloo, Srinagar via Putukhah- Wagoora road and 44 km via Tapper-Kreeri road. It is about 100m away from the Tehsil headquarter Wagoora and about 3.5 km from the medical block Kreeri. It is situated on the left side of the link road which connects Baramulla and Babareshi-Gulmarg. The village has three mosques and 95 households. The population of Durhama is about 698. There is a primary and a middle school in the outskirts of the village. The literacy rate of Durhama is about 67.37% as per 2011 census. A building of the block development office Wagoora is located at the entrance of Durhama. A medical sub centre is also located alongside B.D.O. office.
