= Dara Shikoh Garden =

Garden in Bijbehara, India

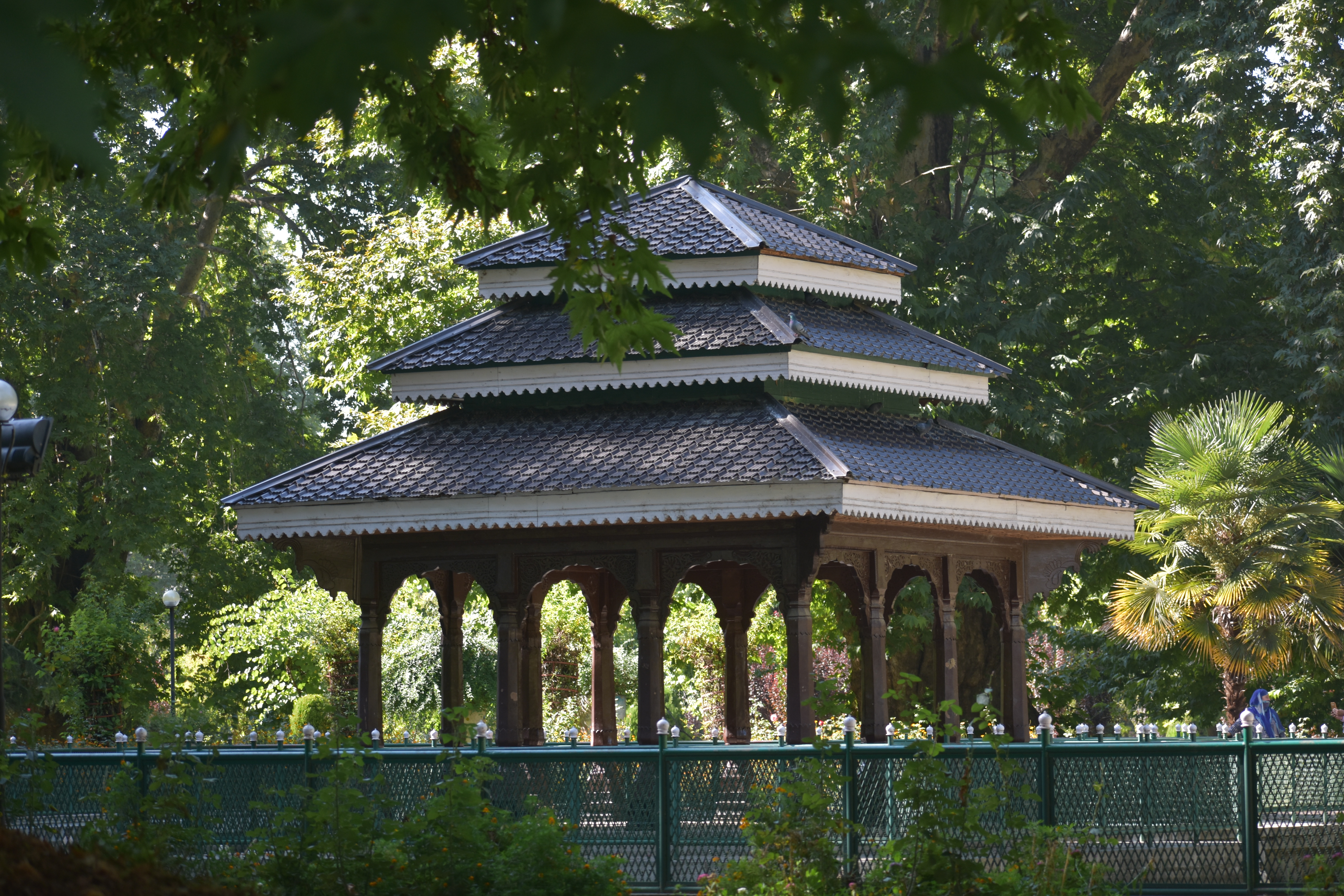
- Type: Mughal Garden
- Location: India, Anantnag, Bijbehara
- Area: 171500 sq.meters
- Opened: 1640 A.D
- Founder: Dara Shikoh

Dara Shikoh Garden is a Mughal garden situated in Bijbehara in the Jammu & Kashmir Union Territory. The garden was constructed under the patronage of Dara Shikoh, the eldest son of Shah Jahan. The garden comprises centuries-old Chinar trees planted by the Mughal emperors, brought from Iran, which is why its host town Bijbehara is also known as Town of Chinars.

== History ==
Dara Shikoh, a Mughal Emperor and the eldest son of the fifth Mughal Emperor Shah Jahan, built the garden in the early 17th century. It was opened in 1640 A.D.
