= Abdul Rehman Veeri =

Indian politician

Jammu and Kashmir Legislative Assembly
- In office 1999–2002
- In office 2002 – June 2004
- In office 2008–2014
- In office 2014 – June 2018
- Constituency: Bijbehara

Personal details
- Party: Jammu and Kashmir Peoples Democratic Party
- Education: University of Kashmir

Abdul Rehman Veeri, also known as Abdul Rehman Bhat, is an Indian politician and the former member of the Jammu and Kashmir Legislative Assembly. He represented Bijbehara constituency from 1999 until June 2018, when the coalition government between the Bhartiya Janata Party and Jammu and Kashmir Peoples Democratic Party ended.

Veeri is the current vice-president at Jammu and Kashmir Peoples Democratic Party. He has also served as minister of state for Rural development, Panchayati raj and for Road and building (R&B).
