= Bashir Ahmad Shah Veeri =

Indian politician

Member of Jammu and Kashmir Legislative Assembly
- Incumbent
- Assumed office 8 October 2024
- Preceded by: Abdul Rehman Veeri
- Constituency: Srigufwara-Bijbehara

Personal details
- Party: Jammu & Kashmir National Conference
- Profession: Politician

Bashir Ahmad Shah Veeri is an Indian politician from Jammu & Kashmir. He is a Member of the Jammu & Kashmir Legislative Assembly from 2024, representing Srigufwara–Bijbehara Assembly constituency as a Member of the Jammu & Kashmir National Conference party. He is the son of former minister Abdul Gani Shah Veeri.

== See also ==
- 2024 Jammu & Kashmir Legislative Assembly election
- Jammu and Kashmir Legislative Assembly
