= Mufti Mohammad Sayeed =

6th chief minister of Jammu and Kashmir (1932–2016)

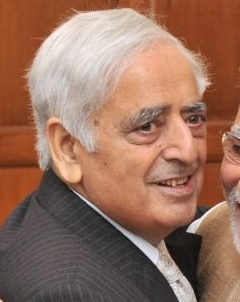
- Mufti Mohammad Sayeed in 2015

6th Chief Minister of Jammu & Kashmir
- In office 1 March 2015 – 7 January 2016
- Governor: Narinder Nath Vohra
- Deputy: Nirmal Kumar Singh
- Preceded by: Omar Abdullah
- Succeeded by: Mehbooba Mufti
- In office 2 November 2002 – 2 November 2005
- Governor: Girish Chandra Saxena; Srinivas Kumar Sinha
- Preceded by: Governor's rule
- Succeeded by: Ghulam Nabi Azad

Minister of Home Affairs
- In office 2 December 1989 – 10 November 1990
- Prime Minister: V. P. Singh
- Preceded by: Sardar Buta Singh
- Succeeded by: Chandra Shekhar

Minister of Tourism
- In office 12 May 1986 – 14 July 1987
- Prime Minister: Rajiv Gandhi
- Preceded by: HKL Bhagat
- Succeeded by: Jagdish Tytler

Member of Parliament, Lok Sabha
- In office 10 March 1998 – 26 April 1999
- Preceded by: Mohammad Maqbool Dar
- Succeeded by: Ali Mohammed Naik
- Constituency: Anantnag
- In office 1 December 1989 – 21 June 1991
- Preceded by: Dharamvir Singh Tyagi
- Succeeded by: Naresh Kumar Baliyan
- Constituency: Muzaffarnagar

Personal details
- Born: 12 January 1936 Bijbehara, Jammu & Kashmir, British India
- Died: 7 January 2016 (aged 79) New Delhi, India
- Party: Jammu and Kashmir Peoples Democratic Party
- Other political affiliations: Jammu & Kashmir National Conference (1950–1965); Indian National Congress (1965–1987, 1991–1999); Janata Dal (1987–1991)
- Children: 4 (including Mehbooba Mufti, Tassaduq Hussain Mufti, Mehmooda Sayeed, and Rubaiya Sayeed)
- Education: Aligarh Muslim University
- Occupation: Politician

Mufti Mohammad Sayeed (12 January 1936 – 7 January 2016) was an Indian politician who served as the chief minister of Jammu and Kashmir twice from November 2002 to November 2005 and from March 2015 until his death on January 7, 2016. He held various positions, including minister of Tourism in Rajiv Gandhi's cabinet and minister of Home Affairs in V. P. Singh's cabinet. Sayeed began his political career in the wing of the National Conference led by G. M. Sadiq, which later merged with the Indian National Congress. In 1987, he transitioned to the Janata Dal and subsequently founded the People's Democratic Party (PDP), a regional political party that remains influential in Jammu and Kashmir, currently led by his daughter, Mehbooba Mufti.

== Early life ==
Sayeed was born on 12 January 1936, in Bijbehara, Anantnag district, then part of the princely state of Jammu and Kashmir, India, into a Kashmiri Sunni Muslim clerical family. He completed his basic studies in Srinagar and earned his law and postgraduate degree in Arabic from Aligarh Muslim University before entering politics.

His daughter, Mehbooba Mufti, is a politician and former chief minister of Jammu and Kashmir.

== Political party affiliations ==
Sayeed started his political career in the 1950s in the Democratic National Conference, a splinter group of the Jammu & Kashmir National Conference led by Ghulam Mohammed Sadiq. He was appointed as the district convenor of the party, which merged back into the National Conference in late 1960.

In 1962, he was elected to the Legislative Assembly from Bijbehara. After G. M. Sadiq became the chief minister of the state in 1964, Sayeed was appointed as a deputy minister in his government.

In January 1965, the National Conference merged into the Indian National Congress. Thus Sayeed became a member of Congress.

In 1972, Sayeed became a cabinet minister and, the president of the state Congress unit. He joined the Rajiv Gandhi's government in 1986 as minister of Tourism. In 1987, he quit the Congress party to join V. P. Singh's Jan Morcha, which led to him becoming the first Muslim minister for Home Affairs in the Union Cabinet of India for one year, from 1989 to 1990.

He rejoined the Congress under P. V. Narasimha Rao, which he left in 1999 along with his daughter Mehbooba Mufti to form his own party, the Jammu and Kashmir Peoples Democratic Party.

== Political career ==
=== Chief Minister: First tenure (2002–2005) ===
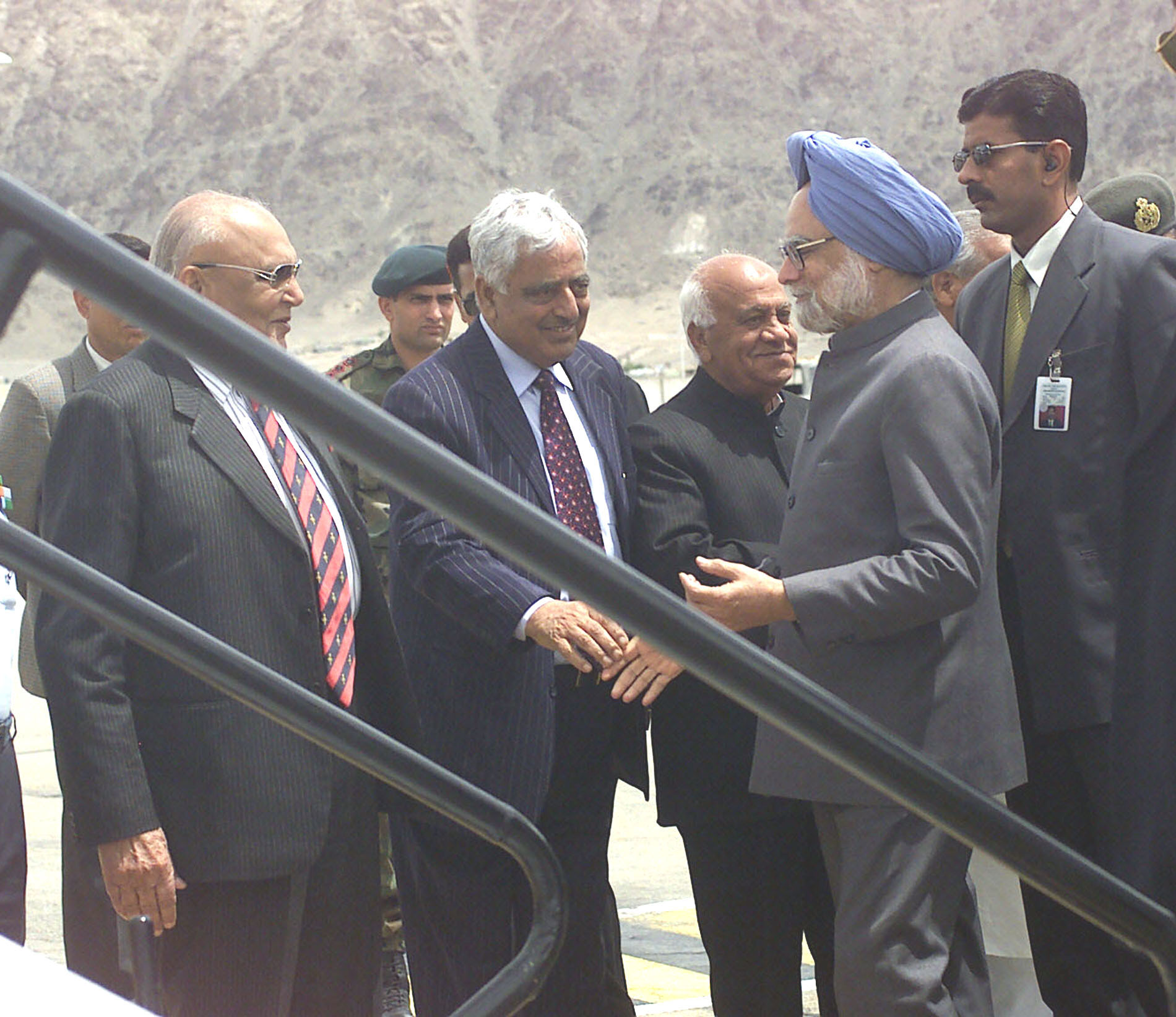
The prime minister, Dr. Manmohan Singh being seen off by the chief minister of Jammu and Kashmir, Mufti Mohammad Sayeed at the Leh Airport, in Jammu & Kashmir on 12 June 2005

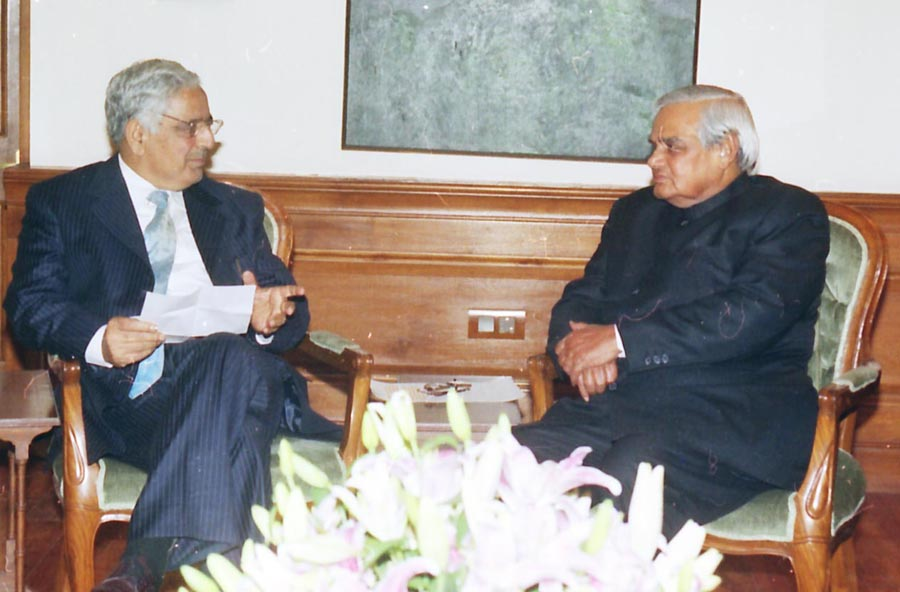
Chief minister of Jammu & Kashmir Mufti Mohammed Sayeed calls on the prime minister Atal Bihari Vajpayee in New Delhi on 12 December 2003

Sayeed participated in the 2002 assembly election and won 18 assembly seats for his Peoples Democratic Party. He went on to form a coalition government with the Indian National Congress, and was sworn in as the chief minister of Jammu and Kashmir for a term of three years.

In 2003, he merged the autonomous Special Operations Group with the Jammu and Kashmir Police. It was under his tenure which coincided with the peace process led by Indian prime ministers Atal Bihari Vajpayee and Manmohan Singh and Pakistani president Pervez Musharraf, with LOC opened for trade and bus service.

=== Chief Minister: Second tenure (2015–2016) ===
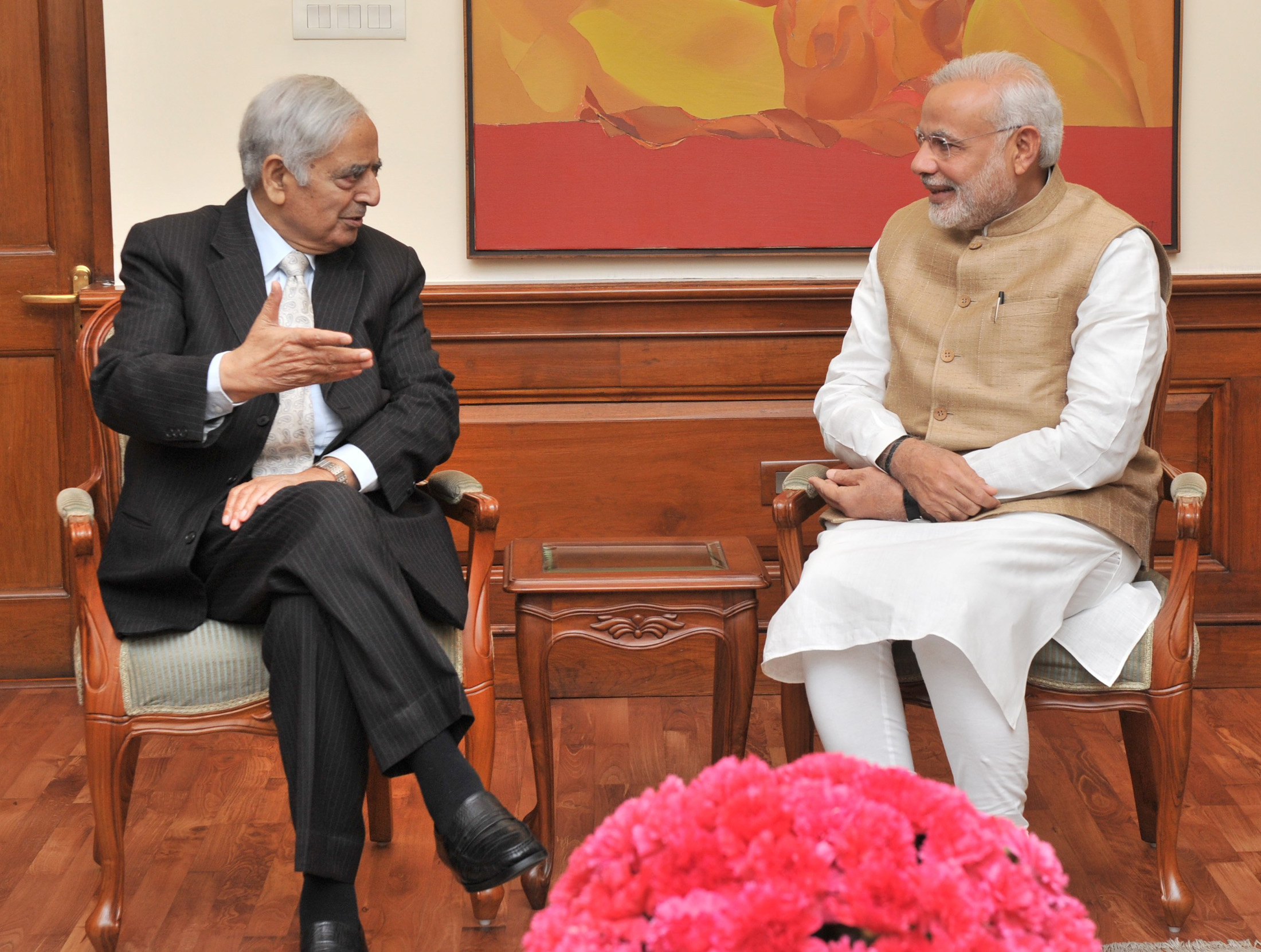
Mufti Mohammad Sayeed meeting the prime minister, Narendra Modi, in New Delhi on 27 February 2015

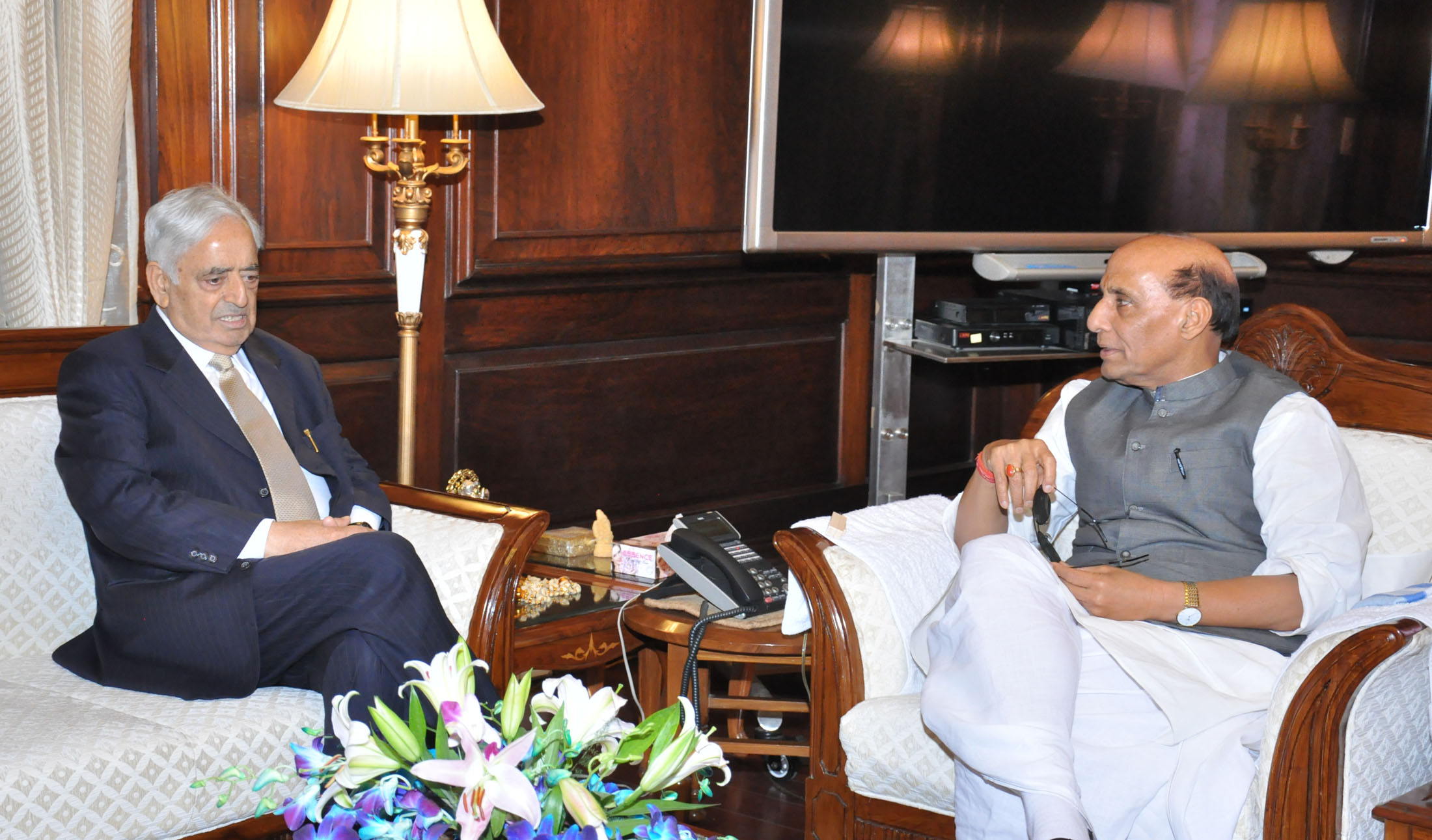
Chief minister of Jammu and Kashmir, Mufti Mohammad Sayeed calling on the Union Home minister, Rajnath Singh, in New Delhi on 7 April 2015

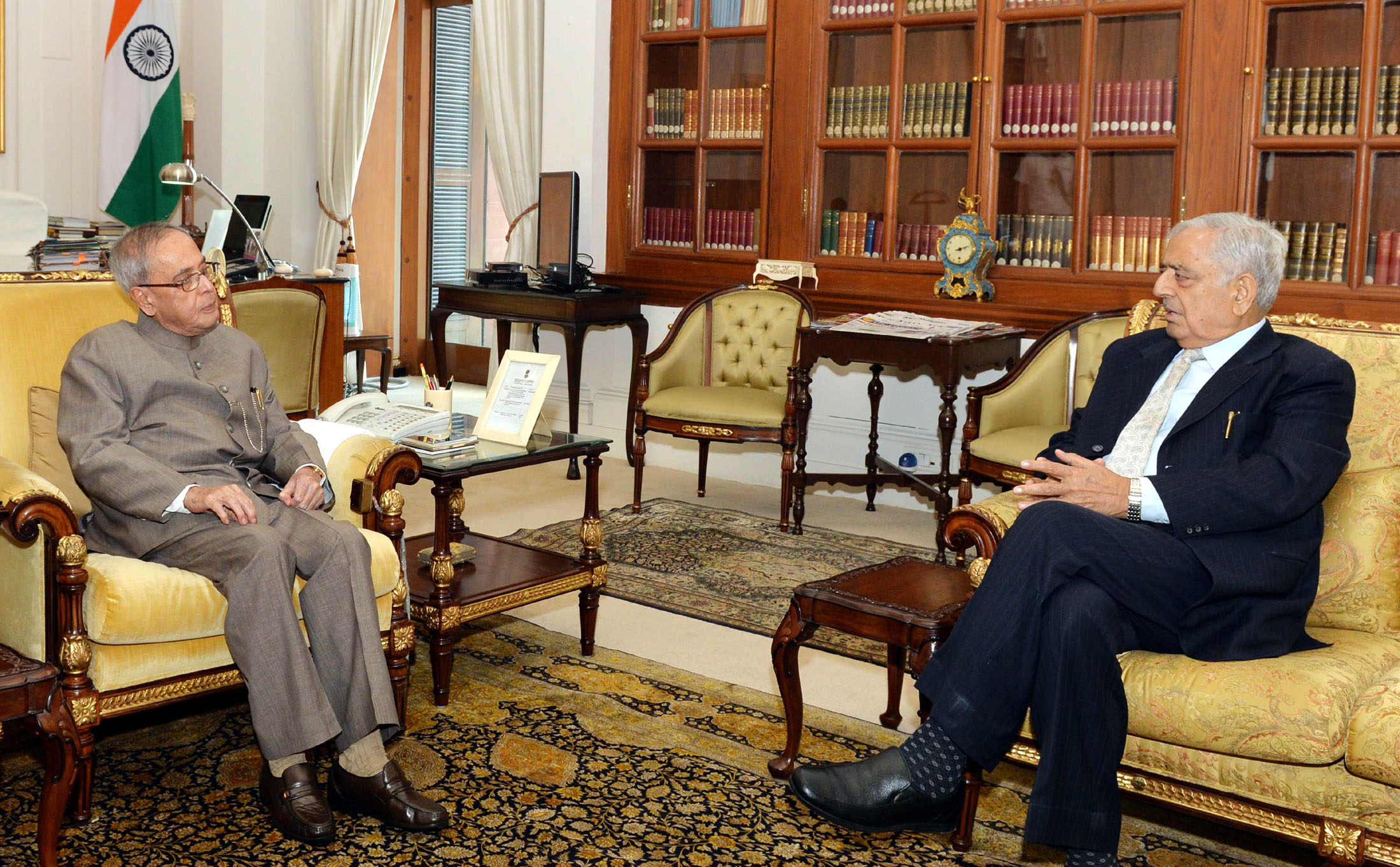
Chief minister of Jammu & Kashmir, Mufti Mohammad Sayeed calling on the president, Pranab Mukherjee, in New Delhi on 28 March 2015

In the 2014 Jammu and Kashmir Legislative Assembly election, the PDP emerged as the single largest party, though it fell short of a majority. Following a coalition agreement between the BJP and the PDP, Sayeed started his second tenure as the chief minister of Jammu and Kashmir in 2015.

=== Union Minister for Home Affairs ===
In 1989, within few days of taking office as the Union Minister for Home Affairs, his third daughter, Rubaiya, was kidnapped in 1989. Under pressure, she was released from captivity. The terrorists were emboldened by this release and this was a turning point in the history of Kashmir militancy which left a long lasting impact in Kashmir. In 1990 the exodus of Kashmiri Hindus happened from the valley of Kashmir. During his tenure as Home Minister of India the Exodus of Kashmiri Hindus took place.

== Attacks on his family and himself ==
Besides attacks on family members Sayeed also survived attacks on his life by Kashmiri separatists. His daughter Rubaiya Sayeed was also kidnapped on 9 December 1989.

== Death ==
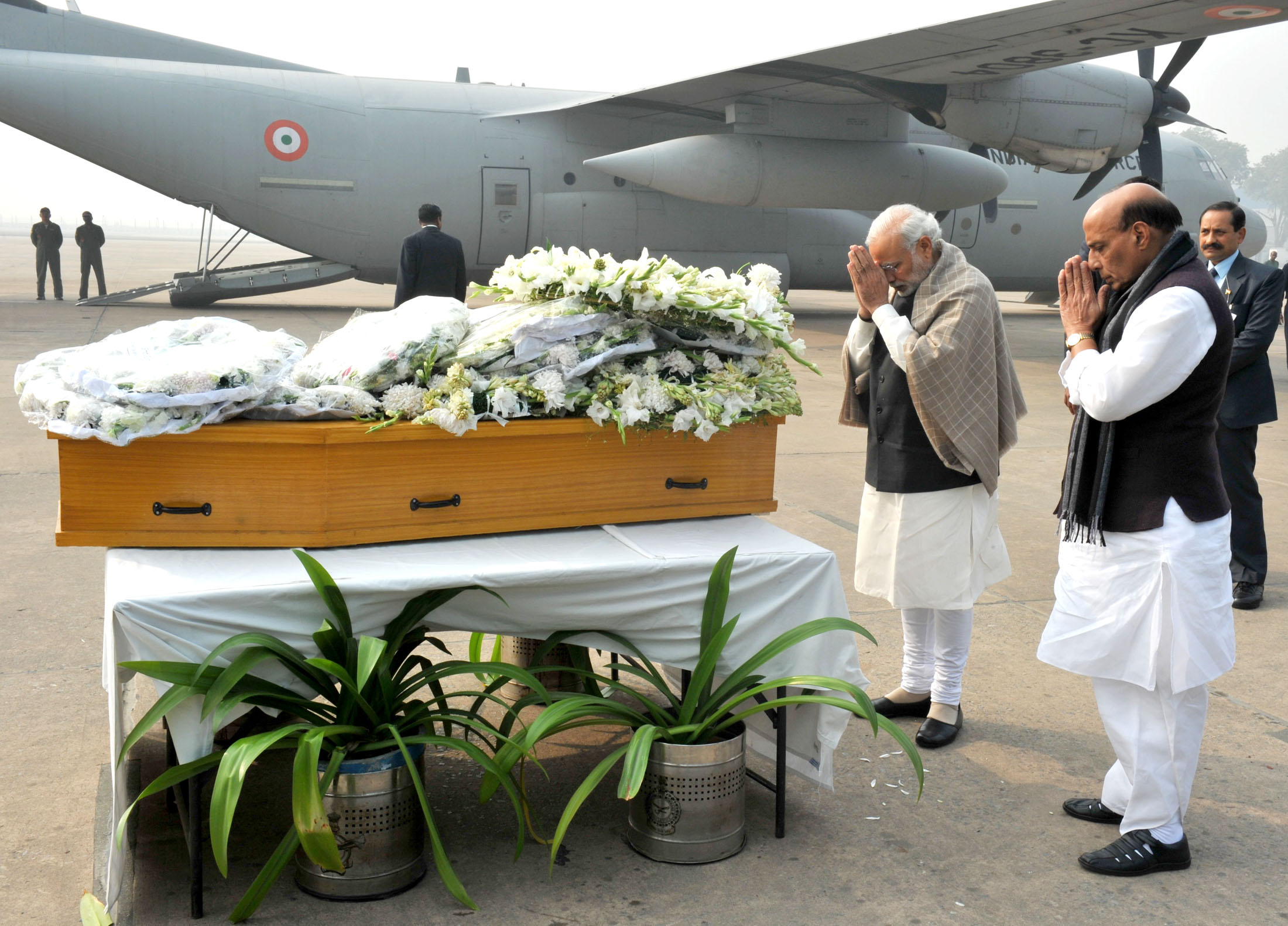
The prime minister, Narendra Modi paying homage at the mortal remains of Mufti Mohammad Sayeed, at Palam Airport, in New Delhi on 7 January 2016

On 24 December 2015, Sayeed was admitted to the AIIMS hospital in New Delhi. He suffered from neck pain and fever. His condition gradually deteriorated, and he was put on ventilator support. He died on 7 January 2016 due to multi-organ failure at about 7:30, according to provincial Education Minister and PDP Spokesman Nayeem Akhter. He was just five days short of his 80th birthday when he died.

Reactions to this death came from prime minister Narendra Modi, national Home Minister Rajnath Singh at Delhi airport and the 14th Dalai Lama. He was buried at his ancestral burial ground in Bijbehera with state honours. Former chief ministers Omar Abdullah and Ghulam Nabi Azad were present at his funeral. Condolences also came from former president Pranab Mukherjee, former deputy prime minister L. K. Advani, Ram Madhav, Delhi chief minister Arvind Kejriwal, BJP vice president Mukhtar Abbas Naqvi, former national Oil minister Milind Deora, PDP member Rafi Mir and politicians Kalraj Mishra, Jitendra Singh and Ahmed Patel.

According to party member and PDP chief spokesperson Mirza Mehboob Beg, the PDP supported his daughter, Mehbooba Mufti, as the next chief minister, while coalition ally BJP expressed "no objection" to her succeeding her father.

Sayeed was buried in Dara Shikoh Garden in Bijbehara.

== See also ==
- 2014 Jammu and Kashmir Legislative Assembly election
- List of chief ministers of Jammu and Kashmir
- Jammu and Kashmir Peoples Democratic Party

== Bibliography ==
- Bose, Sumantra (2003), Kashmir: Roots of Conflict, Paths to Peace, Harvard University Press, ISBN 0-674-01173-2

Lok Sabha
Preceded by Mohammad Maqbool	Member of Parliament for Anantnag; 1998–1999	Succeeded by Ali Mohammed Naik
Political offices
Preceded by Buta Singh	Minister of Home Affairs; 2 December 1989 – 10 November 1990	Succeeded by Chandra Shekhar
Preceded by President's Rule	Chief Minister of Jammu and Kashmir; 2 November 2002 – 2 November 2005	Succeeded by Ghulam Nabi Azad
Preceded by President's Rule	Chief Minister of Jammu and Kashmir; 1 March 2015 – 7 January 2016	Succeeded by Mehbooba Mufti
