= Bijbehara =

Town in Jammu and Kashmir

Bijbehara Vejibror
- Town
- Bijbiara
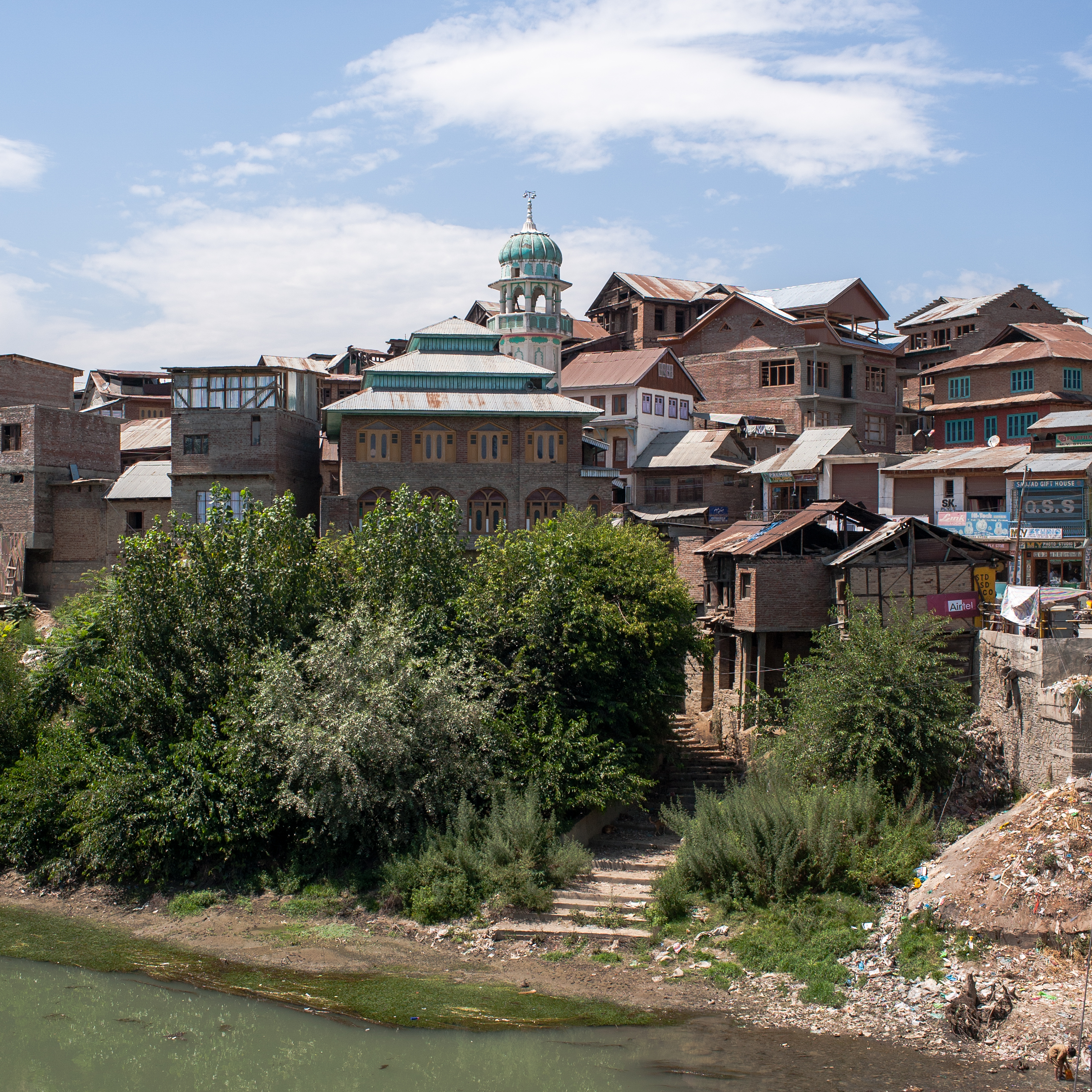
- View of central Bijbehara

- Location in Jammu and Kashmir, India Bijbehara (India)
- Coordinates: 33.80°N 75.10°E
- Country: India
- Union Territory: Jammu and Kashmir
- District: Anantnag
- Elevation: 1,591 m (5,220 ft)

Population (2011)
  - Total: 22,789 excluding Takia Bal and Ghad Hanjipora

Languages
  - Official: Kashmiri, Urdu, Hindi, Gojri, English
- Time zone: UTC+5:30 (IST)
- Vehicle registration: JK-03
- Website: anantnag.nic.in

Bijbehara (Urdu pronunciation: [biːd͡ʒbɪɦɑːɽɑː]), known as Vejibror (Kashmiri pronunciation: [ʋed͡ʒibroːr] or [ʋed͡ʒibʲoːr]) in Kashmiri, is a town and a municipal committee in Anantnag district of the Indian-administered union territory of Jammu and Kashmir in the disputed Kashmir region. It is located on NH 44, and Jehlum bank. It is the location of Dara Shikoh Garden.

== Geography ==
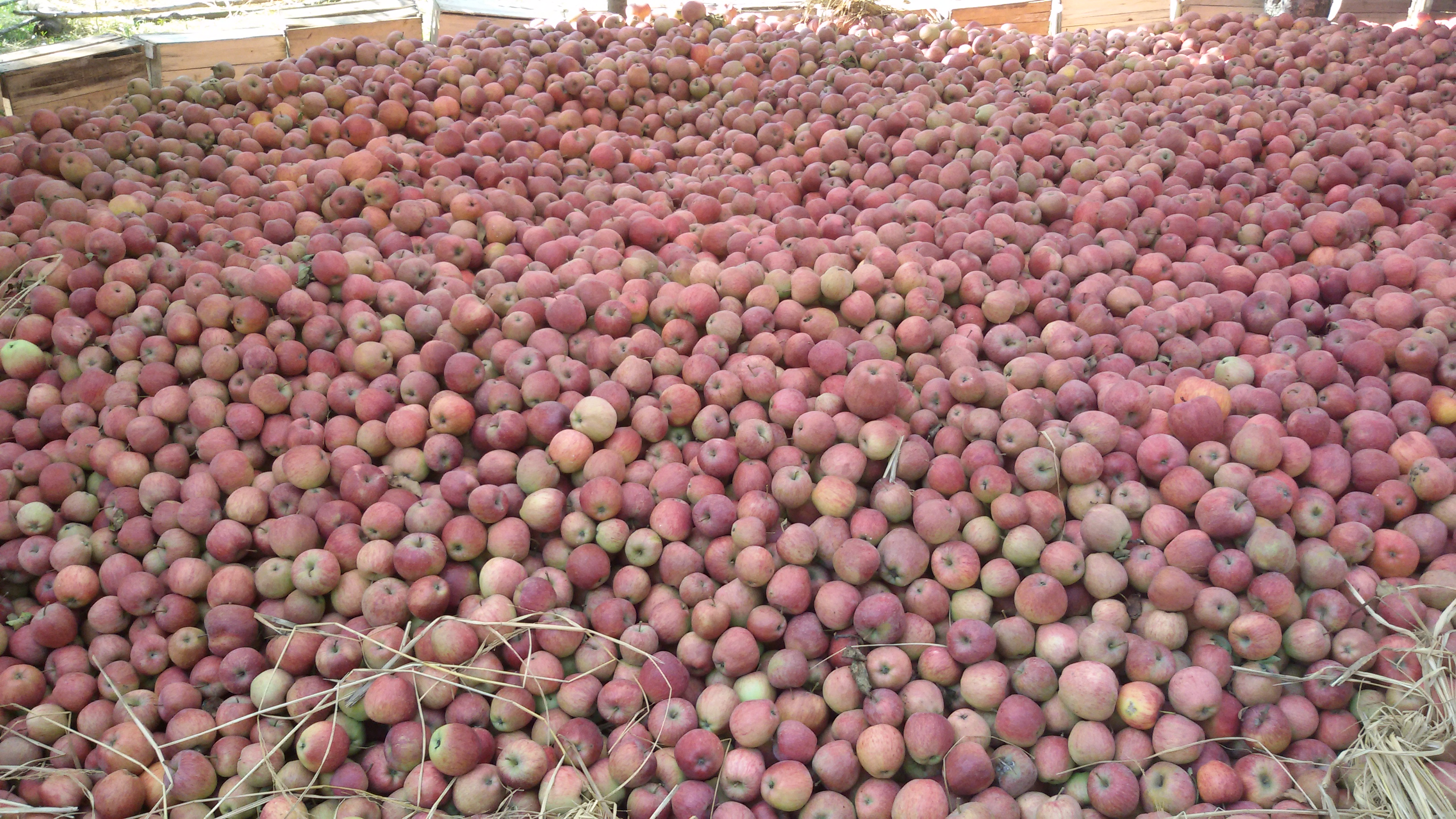
Apples of tribjee arwani, Bijbehara

Bijbehara is located at 33.80°N 75.10°E. It has an average elevation of 1,591 metres (5,223 feet).

== Demographics ==
Religion in Bijbehara Town (2011)
1. Islam (95.8%)
2. Hinduism (3.87%)
3. Sikhism (0.06%)
4. Christianity (0.16%)
5. Buddhism (0.06%)
6. Not stated (0.02%)

The town had a population of 22,789 (12,057 men and 10,732 women) per the report released by Census India 2011. Children aged 0–6 made up 14.97% (3,411) of the total population of Bijbehara.

== Education ==
- Government Degree College, Bijbehara

== Transportation ==
The NH 44 Highway passes through Bijbehara.

Bijbehara railway station is part of the Kashmir Railway.

== Notable people ==
- Mufti Mohammad Sayeed, politician who was Chief Minister of Jammu and Kashmir and Home Minister of India.
- Mehbooba Mufti, politician who was Chief Minister of erstwhile Jammu and Kashmir State.
- Parvez Rasool, Indian cricketer.
- Javed Ahmed Tak, social work.

== See also ==
- Bijbehara Massacre
- Anantnag
- Kokernag
- Parvez Rasool
