= Anantnag district =

District of Jammu and Kashmir, India

- District
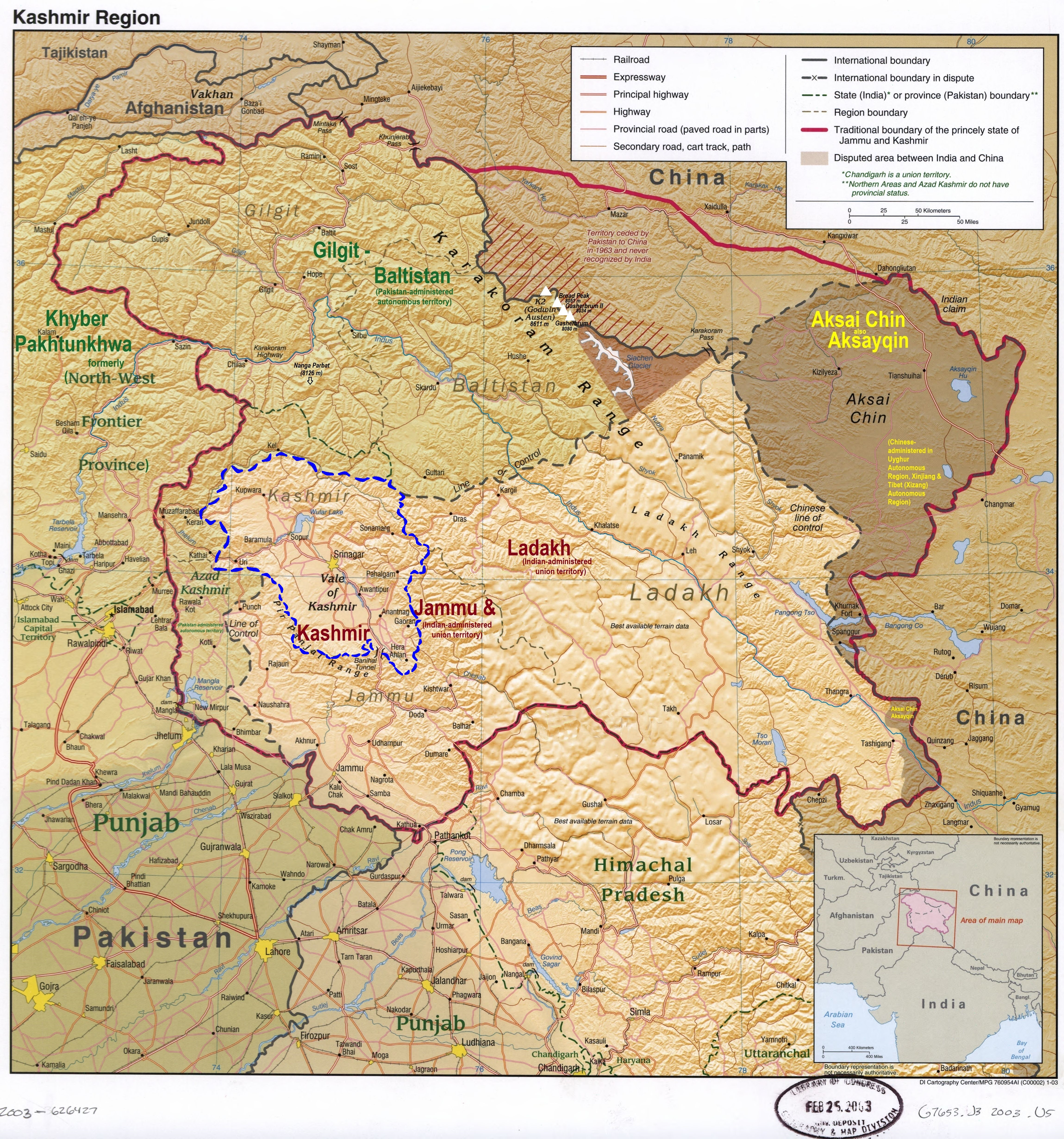
- Anantnag district is in Indian-administered Jammu and Kashmir in the disputed Kashmir region It is in the Kashmir division (bordered in neon blue).
- Interactive map of Anantnag district
- Coordinates: 33°44′40″N 75°11′30″E
- Administering country: India
- Union Territory: Jammu and Kashmir
- Division: Kashmir
- Headquarters: Anantnag
- Tehsils: 1. Anantnag; 2. Anantnag East Mattan; 3. Bijbehara; 4. Shangas; 5. Kokernag; 6. Larnoo; 7. Dooru; 8. Shahbadballa; 9. Qazigund; 10. Pahalgam; 11. Saller; 12. Srigufwara

Government
  - Lok Sabha Constituency: Anantnag - Rajouri
  - MP: Mian Altaf Larvi, JKNC
  - Vidhan Sabha constituencies: 7 constituencies
  - Deputy Commissioner (DC/DM/DDC): Syeed Fakhrudin Hamid (IAS)

Area
  - Total: 3,574 km^{2} (1,380 sq mi)

Population (2011)
  - Total: 1,078,692
  - Density: 301.8/km^{2} (781.7/sq mi)

Demographics
  - Literacy: 62.69%
  - Sex ratio: 927 ♀/ 1000 ♂

Languages
  - Official: Kashmiri, Urdu, Hindi, Dogri, English
- Time zone: UTC+05:30 (IST)
- Vehicle registration: JK-03
- Major highways: NH 44, NH 244, NH 501
- Average annual precipitation: 747 mm
- Website: anantnag.nic.in

Anantnag district is an administrative district of India-administered Jammu and Kashmir in the disputed Kashmir region.

It is one of ten districts which make up the Kashmir Valley. The district headquarters is Anantnag city. As of 2011, it was the third most populous district of Jammu and Kashmir (out of 22), after Jammu and Srinagar.

== Geography ==
Anantnag district has a total area of 3,574 square kilometres (1,380 sq mi). The district is bordered by Kargil district and Kishtwar district in the east, Doda district and Ramban district to the south and Ganderbal district to the north and Kulgam, Srinagar, Pulwama and Shopian districts to the west.

== Climate ==
Anantnag features a moderate climate (Köppen climate classification). Anantnag's climate is largely defined by its geographic location, with the towering Karakoram to its east and the Pirpanjal range to the south. It can be generally described as cool in the spring and autumn, mild in the summer, and cold in the winter. As a large city with significant differences in Geolocation among various districts, the weather is often cooler in the hilly areas of the east as compared to the flat northern part of Anantnag.

Summer is usually mild and with a little rain, but relative humidity is generally high and the nights are cool. The precipitation occurs throughout the year but no one month is particularly dry. The hottest month is July (mean minimum temperature 6 °C, mean maximum temperature 32 °C) and the coldest are December–January (mean minimum temperature −15 °C, mean maximum temperature 0 °C).

Weather conditions are unpredictable. The record high temperature is 33 °C and the record low is −18 °C. On 5–6 January 2012, after years of relatively little snow, a wave of heavy snow and low temperatures shocked the city covering it in a thick layer of snow and ice, forcing them to officially declare a state of emergency and calling the following two days (6 and 7 January) off for the whole valley.

Anantnag has seen an increase in relative humidity and annual precipitation in the last few years. This is most likely because of the commercial afforestation projects which also includes expanding parks and green cover. The suburb parts of Anantnag are lusher than the central part. Anantnag District possesses all the typical characteristics of the climate of Kashmir Valley as a whole. "In his introduction to the Rajtarangini Kulan or Kalhána, Pandit says about the climate of Valley: 'It is a country where the sun shines mildly, being the place created by Kashayapa as if for his glory. High school-houses, the saffron, iced water and grapes, which are rare even in heaven, are common here. Kailasa is the best place in the three worlds, Himalaya the best part of Kailásá, and Kashmir the best place in Himalaya.'"

"Sir Walter Lawrence writes in his book The Valley of Kashmir that in latitude Kashmir corresponds with Peshawar, Baghdad and Damascus in Asia: with Fez in Morocco: and South Carolina in America, but it presents none of the characteristics of those countries. People have linked the climate of Kashmir to that of Switzerland until the end of May, and of Southern France in July and August. But it is impossible to speak of Kashmir as possessing any one climate or group of characteristics. Every hundred feet of elevation brings some new phase of climate and of vegetation."

Climate data for Anantnag (1971–1986)
Month	Jan	Feb	Mar	Apr	May	Jun	Jul	Aug	Sep	Oct	Nov	Dec	Year
Mean daily maximum °C (°F)	7.0 (44.6)	8.2 (46.8)	14.1 (57.4)	20.5 (68.9)	24.5 (76.1)	29.6 (85.3)	30.1 (86.2)	29.6 (85.3)	27.4 (81.3)	22.4 (72.3)	15.1 (59.2)	8.2 (46.8)	19.7 (67.5)
Mean daily minimum °C (°F)	−2.0 (28.4)	−0.7 (30.7)	3.4 (38.1)	7.9 (46.2)	10.8 (51.4)	14.9 (58.8)	18.1 (64.6)	17.5 (63.5)	12.1 (53.8)	5.8 (42.4)	0.9 (33.6)	−1.5 (29.3)	7.3 (45.1)
Average precipitation mm (inches)	48 (1.9)	68 (2.7)	121 (4.8)	85 (3.3)	68 (2.7)	39 (1.5)	62 (2.4)	76 (3.0)	28 (1.1)	33 (1.3)	28 (1.1)	54 (2.1)	710 (27.9)
Average precipitation days (≥ 1.0 mm)	6.6	7.3	10.2	8.8	8.1	5.7	7.9	6.8	3.5	2.8	2.8	5.1	75.6
Source: HKO

== Politics ==
Anantnag district has 7 assembly constituencies: Anantnag, Anantnag West, Dooru, Kokernag, Shangus-Anantnag East, Bijbehara and Pahalgam. Anantnag district has one Lok Sabha constituency. The present MP of Anantnag-Rajouri is Mian Altaf Ahmed Larvi of the JKNC. The DDC chairperson of the district is Yousuf Gorsi of JKNC which is part of the PAGD.

== Demographics ==
Historical population
Year	Pop.	±%
1901	155,387	—
1911	174,661	+12.4%
1921	193,132	+10.6%
1931	215,286	+11.5%
1941	238,136	+10.6%
1951	261,935	+10.0%
1961	285,734	+9.1%
1971	374,175	+31.0%
1981	490,057	+31.0%
1991	638,634	+30.3%
2001	843,892	+32.1%
2011	1,008,039	+19.5%
† 1951 and 1991 populations are estimated Source:

Religion in Anantnag district (2011)
Religion	Percent
Islam	97.99%
Hinduism	1.22%
Sikhism	0.57%
Other or not stated	0.22%

According to the 2011 census Anantnag district had a population of 1,078,692, roughly equal to the nation of Cyprus or the US state of Rhode Island. This gives it a ranking of 425th in India (out of a total of 640). The district has a population density of 375 inhabitants per square kilometre (970/sq mi). Its population growth rate over the decade 2001-2011 was 37.48%. Anantnag had a sex ratio of 927 females for every 1,000 males (this varies with religion) and a literacy rate of 64.32% in 2011. 26.23% of the population lives in urban areas. Scheduled Castes and Scheduled Tribes make up 0.17% and 10.75% of the population respectively.

Anantnag city with population of 108,505 was the largest city in the district. Anantnag Urban Agglomeration had a population of 158,785.

Sex Ratio in Anantnag District in 2011 Census. (no. females per 1,000 males)
Religion (and population)	Sex Ratio
Muslim (pop 1,057,005)	948
Hindu (pop 13,180)	97
Sikh (pop 6,140)	678
Other (pop 2,367)	660
Total (pop 1,078,692)	927

Anantnag district: religion, gender ratio, and % urban of population, according to the 2011 Census.
	Hindu	Muslim	Christian	Sikh	Buddhist	Jain	Other	Not stated	Total
Total	13,180	1,057,005	1,449	6,140	55	7	7	849	1,078,692
Total	1.22%	97.99%	0.13%	0.57%	0.01%	0.00%	0.00%	0.08%	100.00%
Male	12,010	542,671	845	3,660	35	4	3	539	559,767
Female	1,170	514,334	604	2,480	20	3	4	310	518,925
Gender ratio (% female)	8.9%	48.7%	41.7%	40.4%	36.4%	42.9%	57.1%	36.5%	48.1%
Sex ratio (no. of females per 1,000 males)	97	948	715	678	–	–	–	575	927
Urban	8,399	272,573	504	1,149	34	4	1	223	282,887
Rural	4,781	784,432	945	4,991	21	3	6	626	795,805
% Urban	63.7%	25.8%	34.8%	18.7%	61.8%	57.1%	14.3%	26.3%	26.2%

Languages of Anantnag district (2011)
1. Kashmiri (85.1%)
2. Gojri (11.5%)
3. Pahari (1.21%)
4. Others (2.23%)

The predominant language of the district is Kashmiri which is spoken by 85.10% of the population. The second largest language is Gujari which is 11.46%, while Pahari is third with 1.21% of the population.

== Transportation ==
=== Air ===
The nearest airport is Sheikh ul-Alam International Airport in Srinagar located 60 kilometres from district headquarters Anantnag. There is a nearby airbase in Awantipora which is used by the Indian Air Force.

=== Rail ===
Anantnag district is very well-connected with railways. The Jammu–Baramulla line passes through the district. There are numerous railway stations throughout the district.

=== Road ===
The district is well-connected with roads and highways. The NH 44, NH 244 and NH 501 pass through Anantnag district alongside other intra-district roads.

== Villages ==
- Khiram

== Gallery ==
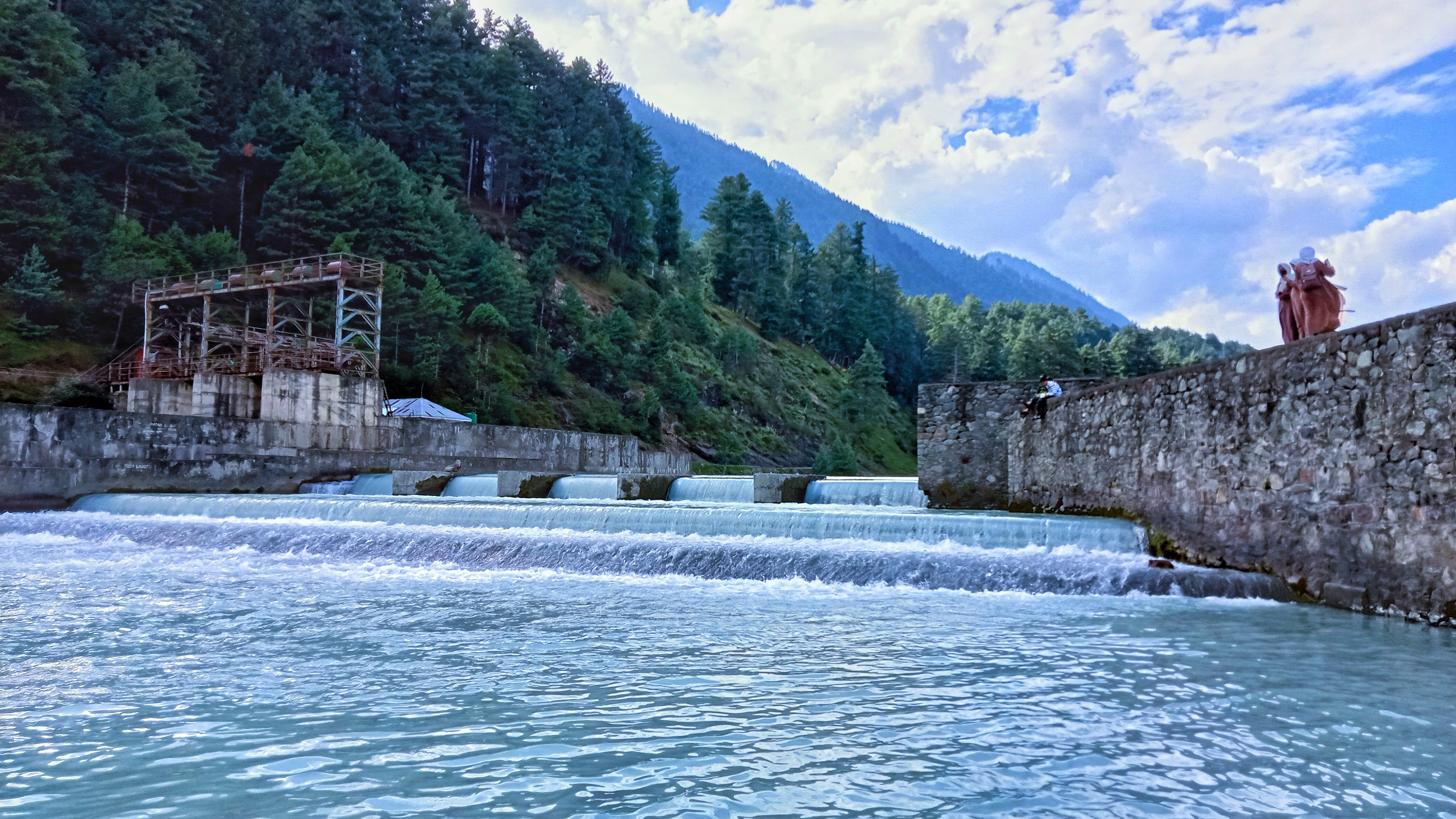
Lavender Park Pahalgam Anantnag Kashmir

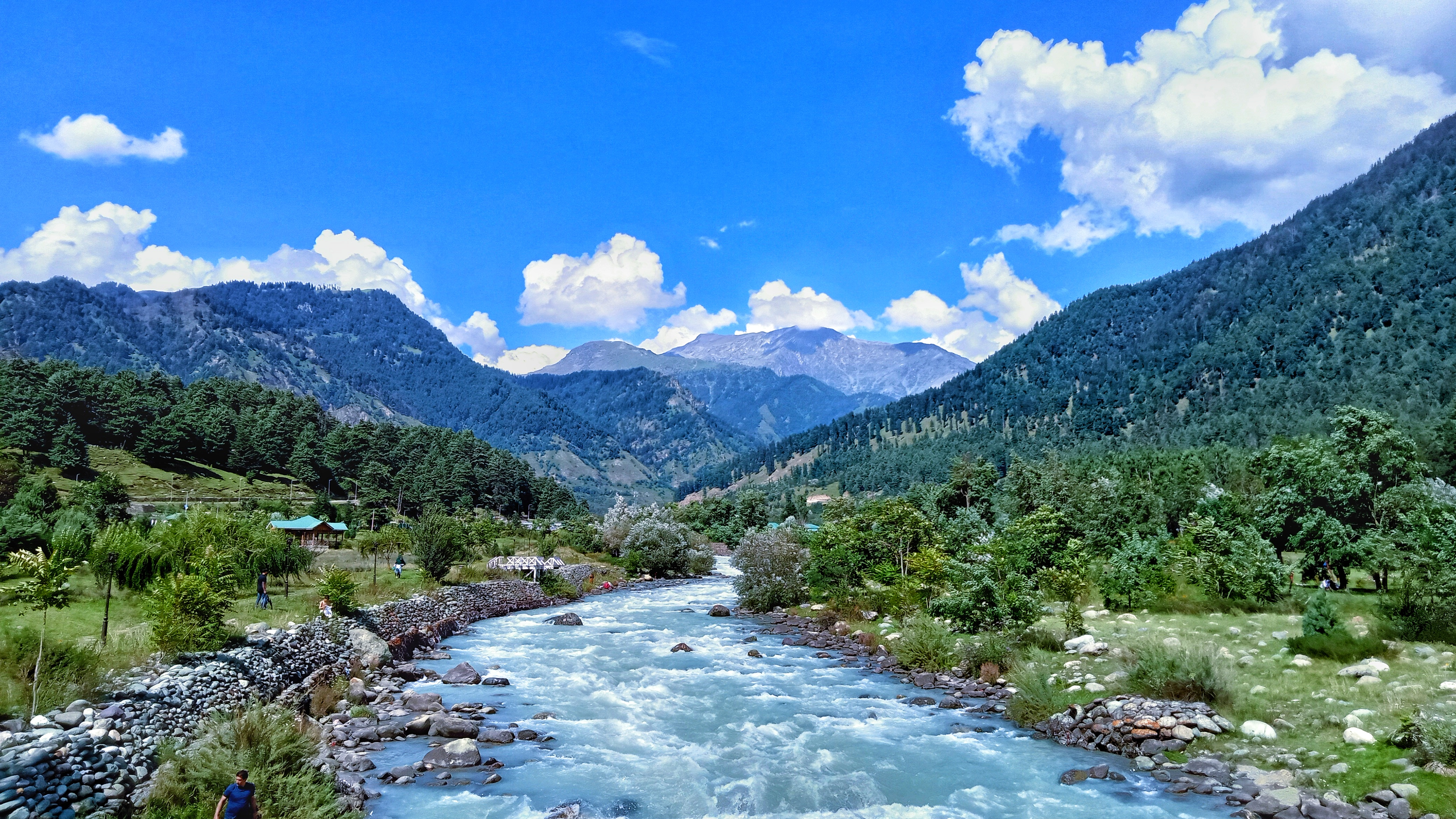
Lavender Park Pahalgam Anantnag Kashmir

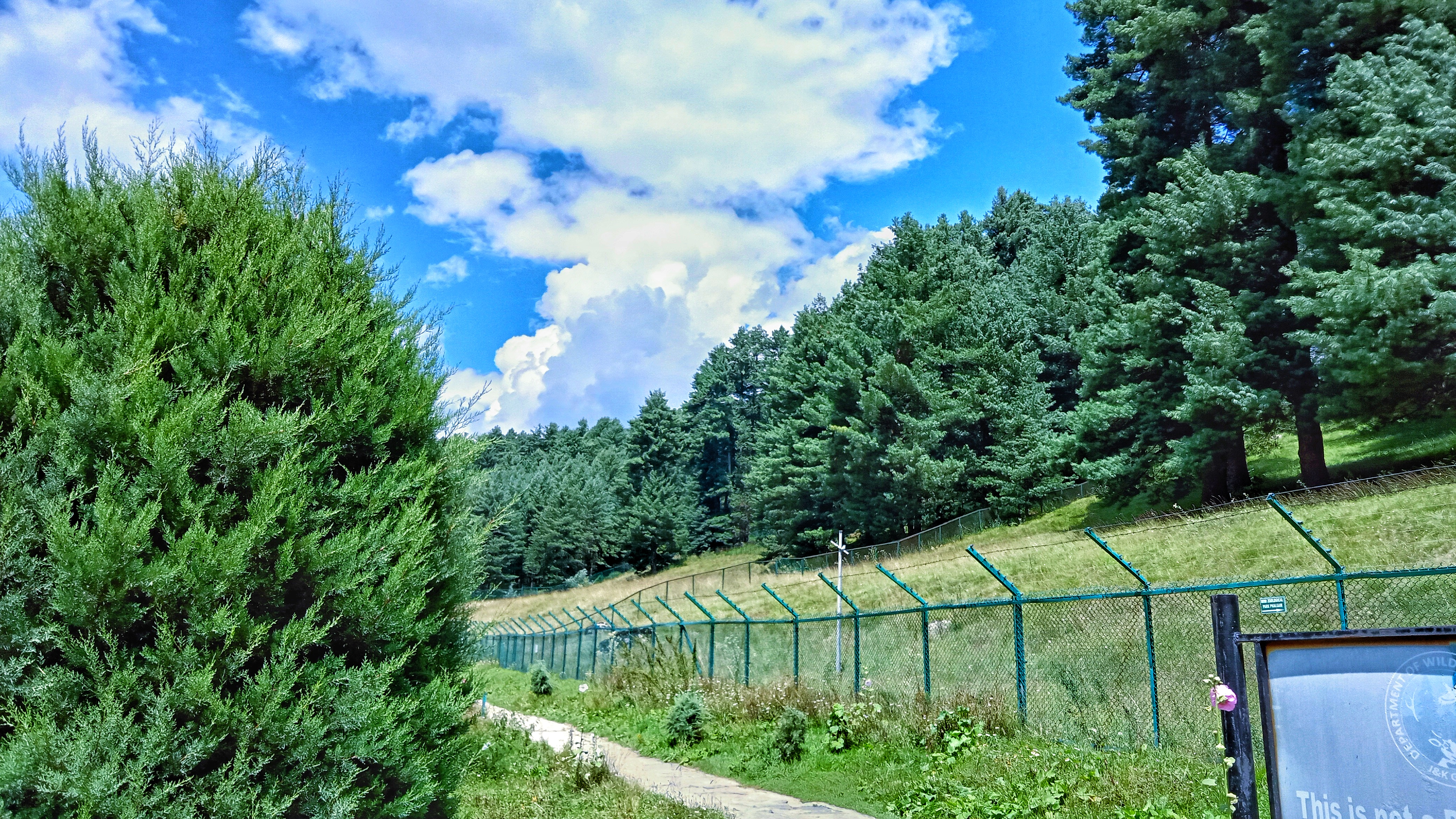
Overa-Aru Wildlife Sanctuary (protected area in Jammu and Kashmir)

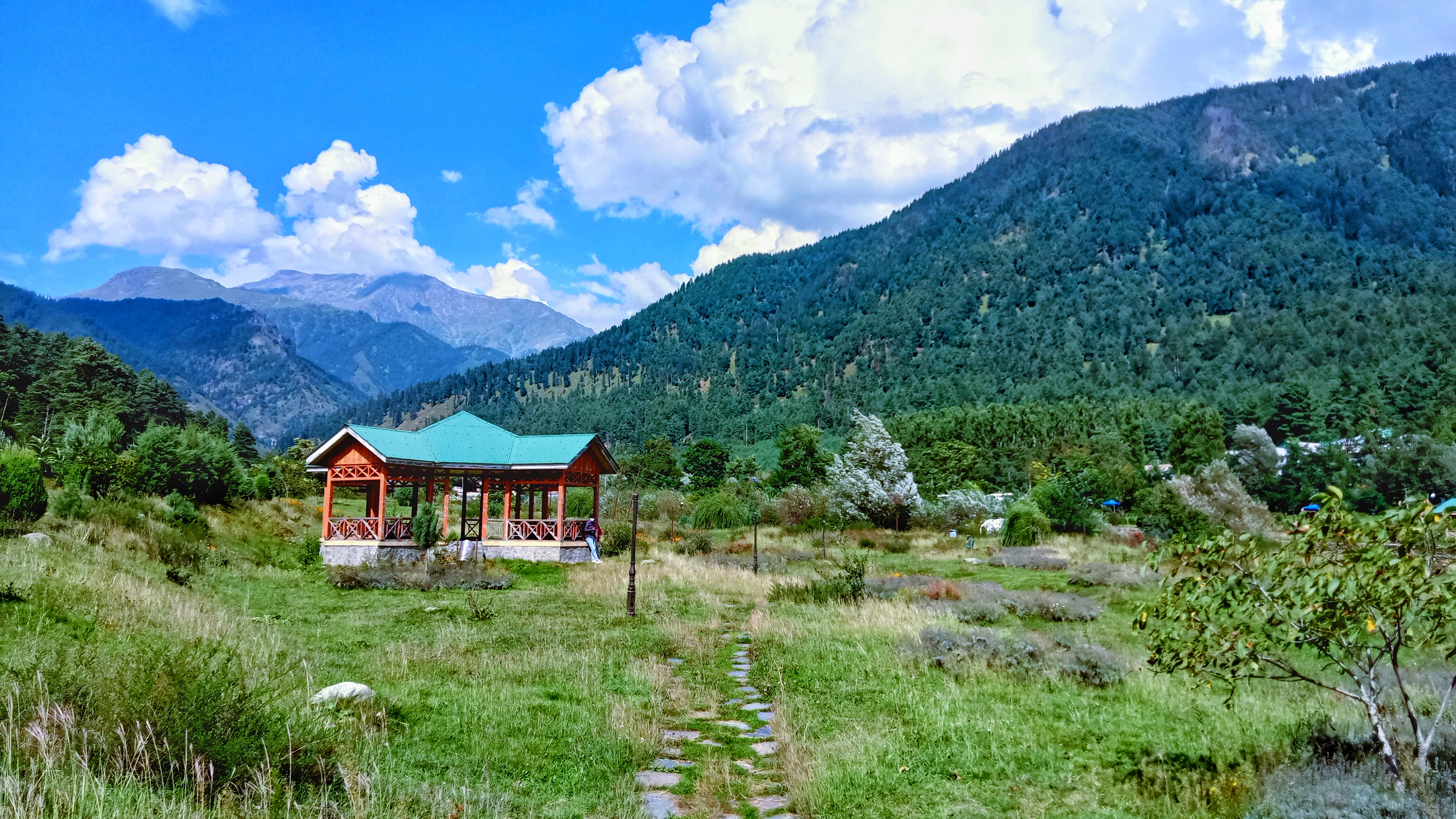
Lavender Park Pahalgam Anantnag Kashmir

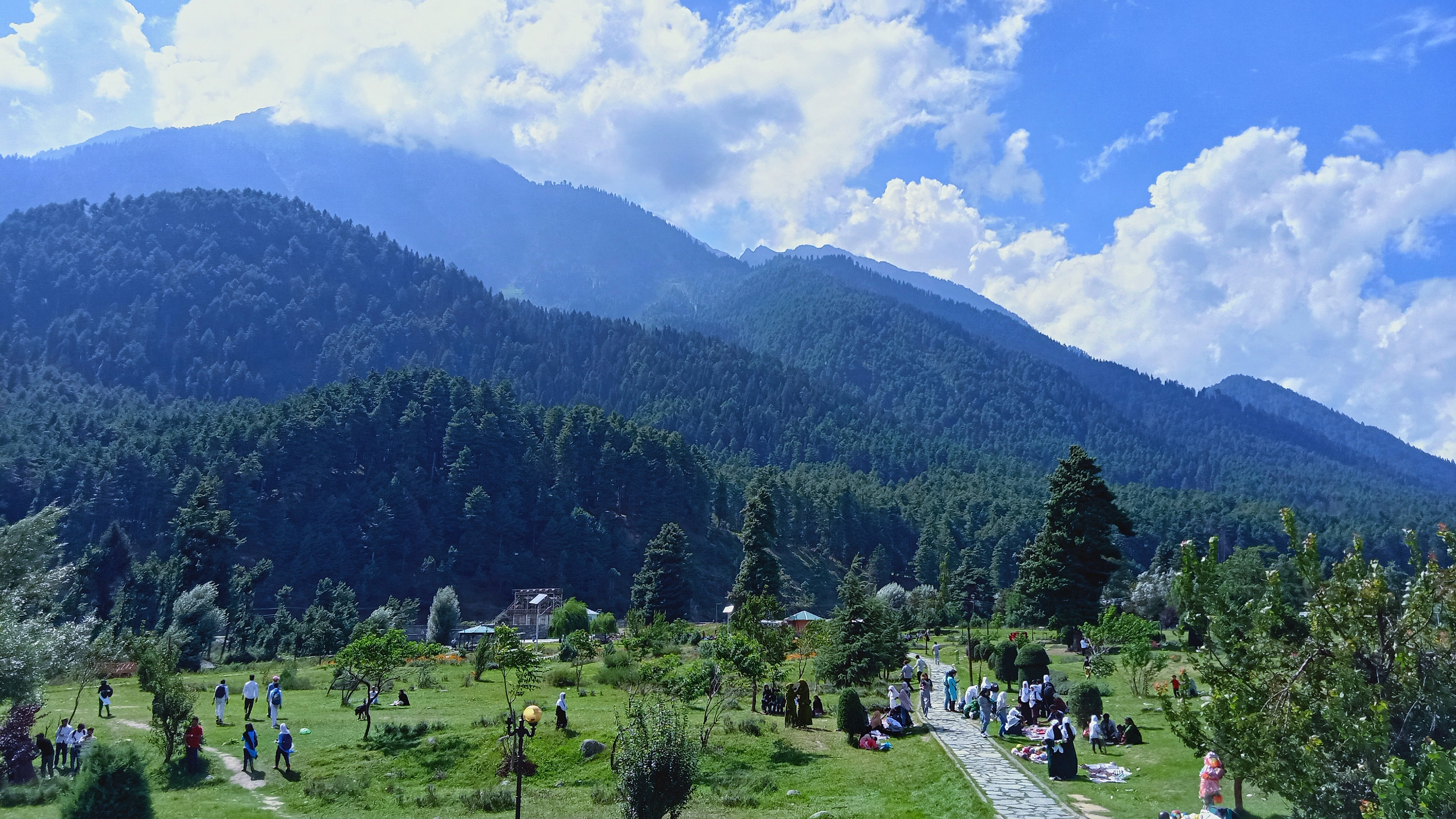
Lavender Park Pahalgam Anantnag Kashmir

== See also ==
- Anantnag railway station
- Kashmir Railway
- Kokernag
- Martand Sun Temple
- Pahalgam
- Qazigund
- Sinthan
- Verinag
