= Padgampora =

Padgampora Padgampur
- Village

- Location in Jammu and Kashmir, India Padgampora (India)
- Coordinates: 33.908°N 74.999°E
- Country: India
- Union territory: Jammu and Kashmir
- District: Pulwama
- Elevation: 1,582 m (5,190 ft)

Population (2011)
  - Total: 6,250

Languages
  - Official: Kashmiri, Hindi, Urdu, Dogri, English
- Time zone: UTC+5:30 (IST)
- Postal code: 192122
- Telephone code: 01933
- Vehicle registration: JK 13
- Sex ratio: ♂/♀
- Website: pulwama.nic.in

Padgampora, also known as Padgampur, is a village in Awantipora tehsil in Pulwama district of Indian administered Jammu and Kashmir. It is located 14 km (8.7 mi) towards East from District headquarters Pulwama. 14 km (8.7 mi) from Tral. 25 km from State capital Srinagar.

== Demographics ==
As of 2001 India census, Padgampora had a population of 6,250. Males constitute 59% of the population and females 41%. Padgampora has an average literacy rate of 71.3%, higher than the national average of 59.5%; with 65.1% of the males and 48.8% of females literate. 14.6% of the population is under 6 years of age.

== Nearby university ==
- Islamic University of Science & Technology (1.5km)

== Connectivity ==
- Railway station 1 km (Awantipora railway station)
- Highway 0.5 km National Highway 44 (India)
- Airport 22 km (Srinagar International Airport)
- Air base 1.5 km (Awantipur Air Force Station)

== See also ==
- Anantnag
- Martand Sun Temple
- Charsoo Awantipora
