= Akhal, Pulwama =

Akhal putrigam
- Village
- Location within Jammu and Kashmir Location within India
- Coordinates: 33.832°N 74.827°E
- Country: India
- Union Territory: Jammu and Kashmir
- District: Pulwama

Area
  - Total: 92.1 ha (228 acres)

Population
  - Total: 1,564

Languages
  - Official: Kashmiri, Urdu, Hindi, Dogri, English
- Time zone: UTC+5:30 (IST)
- PIN: 192301

Akhal is a small village in Pulwama district in the Indian union territory of Jammu and Kashmir, about six kilometres south-west of the main town of Pulwama. It is approximately 30 kilometres away from summer capital Srinagar by road. Akhal is considered the main producer of good quality apples in Pulwama district and is one of the first villages in the area to inherit high-density apple farms. The main source of income is agriculture. Akhal acquires its basic utilities from nearest villages like Rahmoo, Rajpora and Drabgam.

== Demographics ==
The total population stands at 862. Males: 431, females: 431, Children: 136.

The total number of households is approximately 114 according to the 2011 census.

== Transport ==
=== Road ===
Akhal is connected by road to other places in Jammu and Kashmir and India by the NH 444.

=== Rail ===
The nearest major railway stations to Akhal are Awantipora railway station and Srinagar railway station located at a distance of 20 kilometres and 31 kilometres.

=== Air ===
The nearest airport is located in Srinagar International Airport located at a distance of 40 kilometres.

== See also ==
- Jammu and Kashmir
- Awantipora
- Pulwama
