= Ratnipora =

Ratnipora Ratanpur
- Village
- Location in Jammu and Kashmir, India Ratnipora (India)
- Coordinates: 33.921°N 74.943°E
- Country: India
- Union Territory: Jammu and Kashmir
- District: Pulwama

Area
  - Total: 12 km^{2} (4.6 sq mi)
- Elevation: 1,588 m (5,210 ft)

Population (2011)
  - Total: 5,250
  - Density: 440/km^{2} (1,100/sq mi)

Languages
  - Official: Kashmiri, Urdu, Hindi, Dogri, English
- Time zone: UTC+5:30 (IST)
- PIN: 192304
- Telephone code: 01933
- Vehicle registration: JK13
- Website: pulwama.nic.in

Ratnipora (Ratanpur) is a village in the Pulwama district of the Indian union territory of Jammu and Kashmir. It is situated equally distant from three towns, Awantipora, Pulwama and Pampore. The name Ratnipora is a combination of two words, "Ratan" meaning jewel, and "Pur" meaning place.

== Education ==
Ratnipora has an above-average literacy rate for the region, which, as per the 2011 Census, is 71.44% compared to 67.16% for Jammu and Kashmir. In Ratnipora male literacy stands at 82.46% while the female literacy rate was 60.42%. Ratnipora has a very high number of residents who have completed higher education. The people mainly rely on government jobs, but agriculture is also practiced by one-third of the population.

== Demographics ==
While there are five Jamia Masjids, there are more than 50 small Masjids and a Hindu temple. Ratnipora was also inhabited by thirty Hindu (Kashmiri Pandit) households who lived in perfect harmony with their Muslim neighbours but had to leave their homes & hearths in the year 1990 due to disturbed situation in Kashmir valley.

== Geography ==
Ratnipora was inhabited on the banks of a trout stream (namely Naalaye Yar), and there are four bridges connecting the two halves. To the Northwest flows the Romush river coming from Pahoo while to the Southwest flows the Bren Kuol Stream coming from Puchhal, and all the three streams meet the Jhelum River in the southern outskirts of Ratnipora.

A railway halt station is to be operational from the 8th of May 2023.
