= Drabgam =

Village in Jammu and Kashmir, India

Drabgam also known as apple village is a village in the Jammu and Kashmir Union Territory of India. It is one of the largest villages in the Pulwama district by population and area. Drabgam village is 10 kilometres (6.2 mi) south-west of Pulwama and 39 kilometres (24 mi) south of Srinagar and 4 kilometres (2.5 mi) North of Tehsil Headquarter Rajpora.Other nearby villages of Drabgam village are, Rahmoo.

== Demography ==
The total land area of Drabgam is around 581 hectares (1,440 acres) which consists of a total household of around 700. The total population is around 4587 according to the 2011 census. In this, the Male population is around 2321, and the female population comprises 2266. The pin code for the village is 192306.

== Education ==
- SAM public school
- Govt Higher Secondary school Drabgam
- GOVT Girls High School Drabgam
- Sir Syed Memorial Private School
