= Ghulam Nabi Ratanpuri =

Indian politician

Ghulam Nabi Wani Ratanpuri
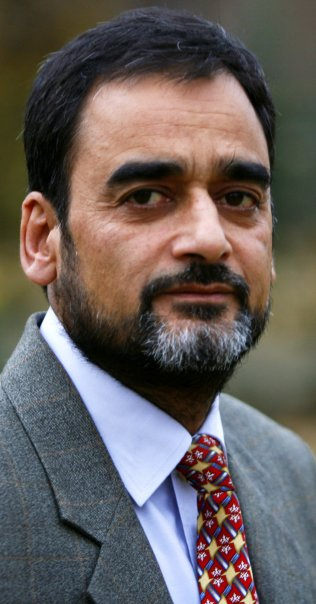

Member of Parliament, Rajya Sabha
- In office 2009–2015
- Constituency: Jammu and Kashmir

Personal details
- Born: 5 April 1954 (age 72) Ratnipora, Jammu and Kashmir, India
- Party: JKNC
- Occupation: Politician

Ghulam Nabi Ratanpuri is a politician in the state of Jammu and Kashmir, India.

== Early life ==
He was born on 5 April 1954 in Ratnipora of Pulwama District, Jammu and Kashmir. Ratanpuri belongs to the Wani caste. He received his early schooling from a local school and then graduated from the University of Kashmir in the year 1976. After graduation Ratanpuri joined the Urdu Newspaper Daily Aftaab as Assistant Editor and continued to work with the paper until 1979. In year 1979 at a young age he was appointed as the editor of the Nawa-e-Subh which was published by the then ruling party Jammu & Kashmir National Conference. Working at the Nawa-e-Subh was instrumental for Ratanpuri in developing acquaintance with then Chief Minister Sheikh Mohammad Abdullah. He joined All India Radio at Srinagar in the year 1981 after being selected by the Union Public Service Commission as a Programme Officer, but continued to work for Nawa-e-Subh until the death of Sheikh Mohammad Abdullah. By the year 2000 he had become one of the renowned interviewers in the State of J&K.

== Political career ==
Ratanpuri had campaigned for Omar Abdullah in the Lok Sabha in 2004. In 2008 Omar Abdullah asked him to contest elections from his party, Jammu & Kashmir National Conference, to which he agreed. Consequently, he had to seek premature retirement in order to contest the Assembly Elections. In his political debut the result of the election was not in his favour and he lost the election by a huge margin to Jammu and Kashmir Peoples Democratic Party candidate Mohammad Khalil Bandh. Even though unsuccessful in the assembly elections but due to his stature, his then party JKNC in July 2009 nominated him to be the member of Rajya Sabha, to which he was elected in August 2009. As a Member of Parliament (India) he was the member of the Parliamentary Standing Committee on Labour, Parliamentary Forum on Children and the Parliamentary Consultative Committee for HRD Ministry. Before his resignation from Jammu & Kashmir National Conference he was the vice president for the party from South Kashmir.

== 2014 Legislative Assembly elections ==
Ratanpuri again lost the state legislative assembly elections in 2014 to Mohd Khalil Bandh. Though again unsuccessful the loss was less disappointing than the previous one as this time he had lost by only a margin of 1032 votes (3.45% of the valid votes).

== Resignation ==
Following the development in which the Ex MLA of JKPDP from Pulwama Mohd. Khalil Bandh]] joined JKNC, Ratanpuri resigned from the JKNC after a period of 10 years, citing the differences he had developed with the party high command, especially the incumbent vice president of the party Omar Abdullah.

== Controversies ==
Ratanpuri made headlines in the State of J&K during the 2010 Kashmir unrest . He openly opposed the policies of his government and criticised Omar Abdullah, Chief Minister of the State. This led to the creation of differences between Ratanpuri and Omar Abdullah.

Ratanpuri also came into limelight involving a controversy in his home constituency. The incident that caused the controversy was narrated by aide of Ratanpuri as follows. "The Superintendent of Police at Pulwama misbehaved with Ratanpuri and Ratanpuri was all fire against his party for not taking any action against the Police Officer concerned. The indifference of his Government forced Ratanpuri forced him to file a Breach of Privilege Motion against the Police Officer before the Privileges Committee of the Rajya Sabha. During the proceedings of the Privilege Committee, the Director General of Police J&K and the Chief Secretary were called in person to New Delhi, and the proceedings finally culminated into tendering of an unconditional apology by the Director General of Police J&K, the Chief Secretary and the Superintendent of Police at Pulwama."

Though a member of mainstream political party Ratanpuri in March 2013 met the Hurriyat Leader, Syed Ali Shah Geelani at his New Delhi residence, where Geelani was under continuous detention for weeks together. According to Ratanpuri he was instrumental in release of the Veteran Hurriyat Leader from house arrest after he met the Union Home Minister S. K. Shinde and Union Health Minister Ghulam Nabi Azad and demanded Geelani's release. Geelani was released with 24 hours after Ratanpuri's meet with the two Union Ministers.

Ratanpuri again grabbed the headlines in Newspapers in the valley after he called the founder of his party, Sheikh Mohammad Abdullah a man of Flaws, Failures and Fallacies. This did not go well within the party and a war of words started between Ratanpuri and Sheikh Mustafa Kamal, son of Sheikh Abdullah. However, the Ruling National Conference remained silent on the issue and did not state anything in public. He is the first Member of Parliament from the State of J&K to have Filed a Privilege Motion against the Public Functionaries of the state, raised the Kashmir Dispute on the Floor of the Indian Parliament, disrupted the address of the President of India to both houses of the Parliament and raised the issue of hanging of Afzal Guru.

After the hanging of Afzal Guru, Ratanpuri often criticised his Governments inactions and wrong policies, thereby turning him into an outcast in his own party. Though his actions were widely appreciated by the Civil Society of Kashmir and people at large but things were not well within his party.

Due to his continuous criticism of his own party policies and members, the then Chief Minister from his own party, Omar Abdullah asked him to leave the party. To these comments of Omar Abdullah Ratanpuri did not make a reply in public. Consequently, his party took no action for his removal and the matter subsided.

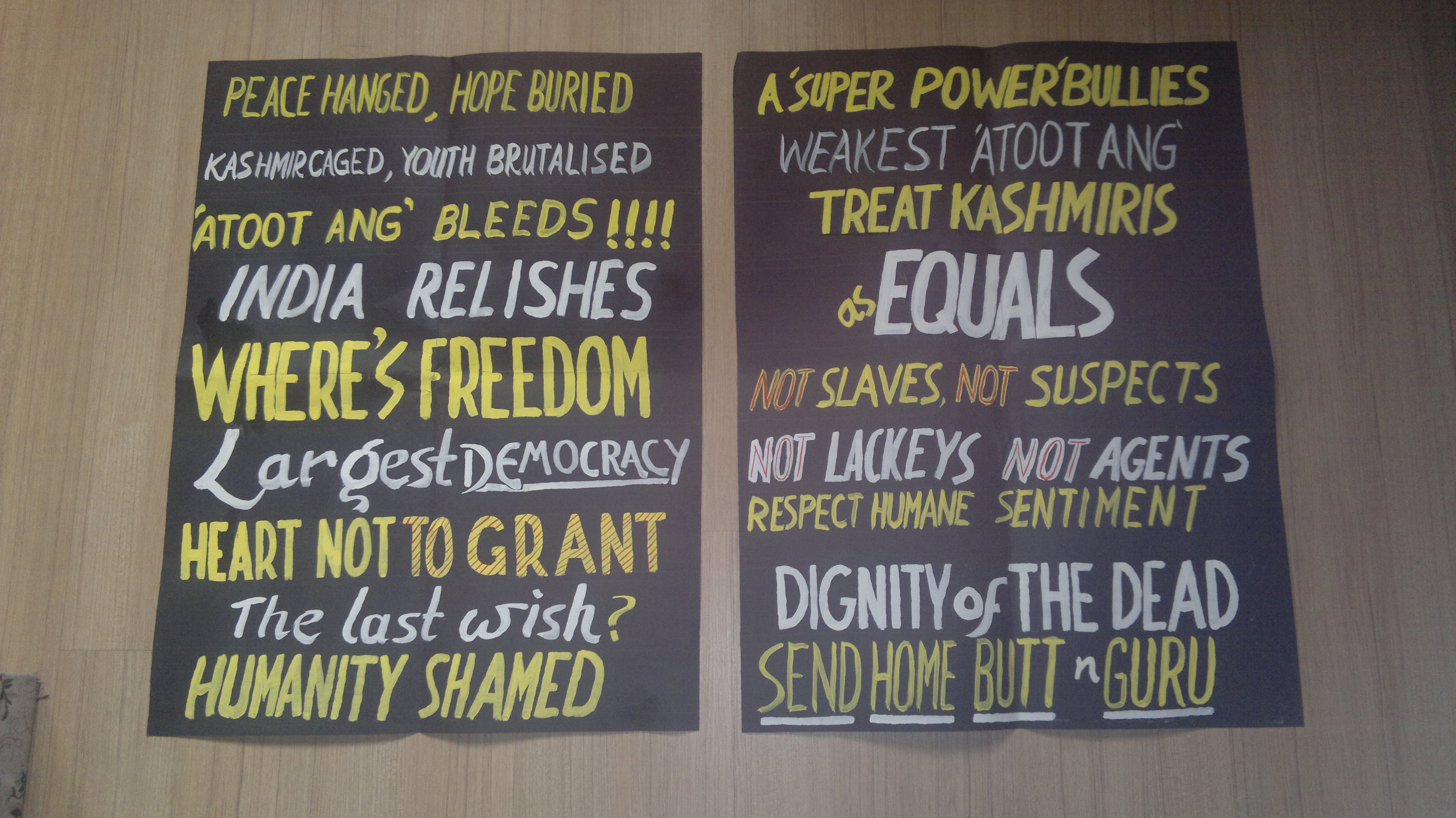
Placards demanding return of the mortal remains of Afzal Guru and Maqbool Bhat

Ratanpuri was very vocal in the Parliament with regard to the Kashmir issue. During the Joint session of the Parliament in early 2013, Ratanpuri rose to disrupt the address of the President of India holding black placards in both hands, demanding return of the mortal remains of Mohammad Maqbool Bhat and Afzal Guru.
