= Kakapora railway station =

Railway station in Pulwama, India

Kakapora Railway Station

General information
- Location: Pulwama, Jammu and Kashmir; India
- Coordinates: 33.9531°N 74.9136°E
- Elevation: 1594.966
- System: Indian Railways station
- Owner: Indian Railways
- Operator: Northern Railways
- Line: Jammu–Baramulla line

Construction
- Parking: Yes

Other information
- Status: Active
- Station code: KAPE
- Zone(s): Northern Railway
- Division(s): Jammu

History
- Opened: 2013
- Electrified: Ongoing
Location
- Location within Jammu and Kashmir

Kakapora railway station is a railway station in the Northern Railway zone of Indian Railways. It is one of the four stations in Pulwama district, others being Awantipora railway station, Pampore railway station and Panzgam railway station respectively.

== Location ==
The station is situated in notified area of Kakapora in Pulwama district about 20 km south of Srinagar.

== History ==
The station has been built as part of the Jammu–Baramulla line megaproject, aiming to link the Kashmir Valley with Jammu Tawi to the Indian railway network. The Leg 2 section of this network is incomplete. It is expected to be completed by 2017. An extension of the railway line between Kakapora and Shopian is planned in January 2026.

== Design ==
Like every other station in this mega project, this station also features Kashmiri wood architecture, with an intended ambience of a royal court which is designed to complement the local surroundings to the station. Station signage is predominantly in Urdu, English and Hindi.

In 2022, an RPF personnel was killed in a terror attack outside the station.

== See also ==
- Anantnag railway station
