= Renzipora =

- Coordinates: 33.859°N 74.996°E

Area
  - Total: 1 km^{2} (0.39 sq mi)

Languages
  - Official: Kashmiri, Hindi, Urdu, Dogri, English

Renzipora is a village in Awantipora tehsil of district Pulwama, Jammu and Kashmir, India. Almost at an equal distance from District Pulwama and Tehsil Awantipora. Renzipora is settled in a lush vale in the shadow of small hills drained by an irrigation Kul.

== Demographics ==
It consists of 200 households. The village had a population of 694 according to the 2011 Census of India.. Awaiting the results of census 2021 seems like the population has increased exponentially in this decade.

== Geography ==
The nearest town is Awantipora, 6 km away.

== Governance ==
Renzipora comes under ReshiPora panchayat. Awantipora is the sub district headquarters. District headquarters of the village is Pulwama, 11 km away. The village is situated on relatively elevated grounds and has been a refuge during floods.

== Economy ==
Renzipora village produces apples, almonds, walnuts and saffron. The average net yield/tree is about 7.5 kg with nut length of 29 mm and nut width of 14.06mm.

Renzipora was earlier called "Rezikpora" (Rezikh meaning food, pora meaning place) as it was always rich in food resources like maize, wheat, rice etc. due to fertile land.

Renzipora is the home of two veneer firms, Skyline veneer and Diamond veneer. The veneer is peeled from popular woods. These industries were set up with the help of transport subsidies disbursed under Govt. of India Scheme JK DFC w.e.f. 1-04-2008 to 31-03-2009. 42 lakhs was disbursed into these industries by government via Jammu and Kashmir Bank awantipora.

Renzipora village was given RBA status in 2010.

== Education ==
One government funded middle school, one primary school, one sub-centre operate there.
