= Khadermoh =

- Village
- Location in Jammu and Kashmir, India
- Coordinates: 33°58′57″N 74°53′57″E
- Country: India
- State: Jammu and Kashmir
- District: Pulwama

Area
  - Total: 2.45 km^{2} (0.95 sq mi)

Population (2011)
  - Total: 235 householders
  - Density: 95.9/km^{2} (248/sq mi)

Languages
  - Official: Kashmiri, Urdu, Hindi, Kashmiri
- Time zone: UTC+5:30 (IST)
- PIN Code: 192301
- Literacy: 45.37%
- Distance from Pulwama: 14.6 kilometres (9.1 mi)
- Distance from Srinagar: 19.5 kilometres (12.1 mi)

Khadermoh is a village located in Pulwama district in Indian union territory of Jammu and Kashmir. At a distance of 14.6 km, its district headquarters and administrative units are located in Pulwama via Pampore - Kakapora Road and Pulwama-Srinagar Road that connects Khadermoh village to state capital Srinagar which is situated 19.5 km away via NH44 and NH1.

== Population ==
As per 2011 Census of India, there are 1528 citizens residing in Khadermoh village, of which 760 are males and 768 are females. The male literacy rate is 56.2% while female literacy rate is 34.6%. The overall literacy rate recorded was 45.37%, compared to J&K.
