= Kalampora =

Kalampora Kalampur Kalam Pora
- Village
- Location in Jammu and Kashmir, India
- Coordinates: 33.8°N 74.81°E
- Country: India
- State: Jammu and Kashmir
- District: Pulwama

Area
  - Total: 2.25 km^{2} (0.87 sq mi)

Population (2011)
  - Total: 2,606
  - Density: 1,160/km^{2} (3,000/sq mi)

Languages
  - Official: Kashmiri, Urdu, Hindi, Dogri, English
- Time zone: UTC+5:30 (IST)
- PIN Code: 192301
- Literacy: 58.59%
- Distance from Pulwama: 15 kilometres (9.3 mi)
- Distance from Srinagar: 42 kilometres (26 mi)

Kalampora, also known as Kalampur or Kalam Pora, is a village in Pulwama district of Jammu and Kashmir, India. This village is situated between Shopian district at a distance of 14 km towards South and Pulwama at a distance of 15 km towards North where its district headquarters are located. It takes 1 hour and 44 minutes to cover the distance of 47 km between Kalampora and state summer capital Srinagar.

== Population ==
According to The 15th Indian Census report, there are 833 householders residing in Kalampora village where, the total population is 5334 of which, 2709 are males and 2625 are females. The literacy rate recorded against the literacy rate 67.16% of Jammu and Kashmir, was 58.59% including men and women.

== Educational institutes ==
In Kalampora, Three educational institutions two high schools, one govt and one private & one primary school are working under the Shadimarg zone which provides education up to 10th standard. The village needs one higher secondary school in order to cater education needs of the area. Students of higher secondary level have to walk many kilometres for education purpose. The Department of Education J&K, has established a school (officially known as HS Kalampora) which provides elementary education to the students of this village.
