= Qazigund, Kakapora =

Qazigund Qaezgund
- Qazigund
- Coordinates: 33.95702°N 74.90614°E
- Country: India
- State: Jammu and Kashmir
- District: Pulwama
- Tehsil: Kakapora

Government
  - Type: Panchayat
  - Body: Village Panchayat
- Elevation: 1,589 m (5,213 ft)

Population (2011)
  - Total: 875
  - Sex ratio: 923 ♀/1,000 ♂
  - Total Households: 141
- Time zone: UTC+05:30 (Kolkata)
- PIN: 192304
- Vehicle registration: JK 13-XXXX

Qazigund (Urdu pronunciation: [qɑːziː ɡʊnɖ], Kashmiri pronunciation: [qəːzʲ ɡonɖ]), also spelled as Kazigund or Quazigund, is a village located in the Pulwama district of Jammu and Kashmir, India.

== Geography ==
Qazigund a small village located in the plains of the valley of Kashmir. It has an elevation of 1589 meters.
