= Pampore railway station =

Railway station in Srinagar, India

Pampore Railway Station
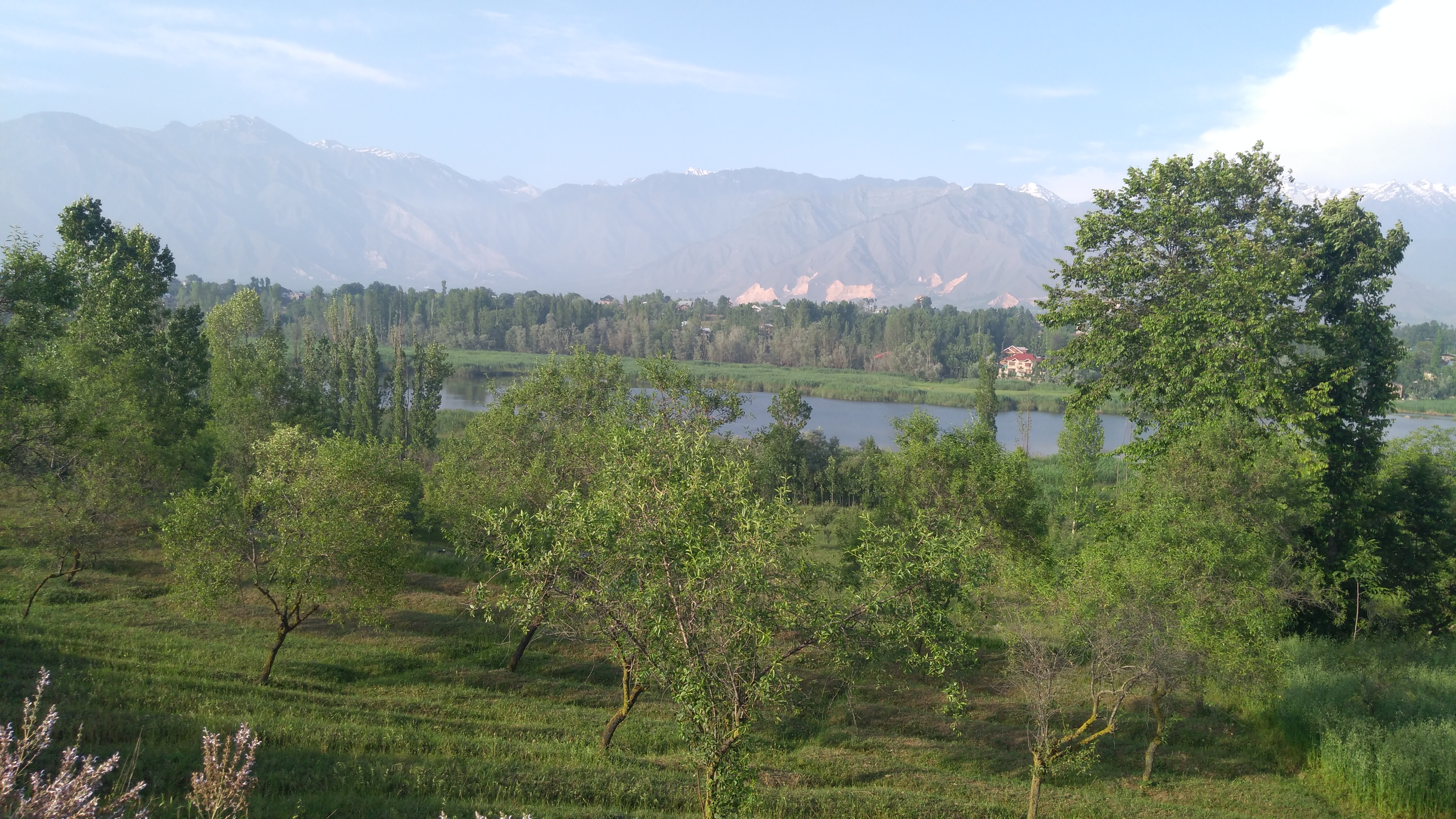

General information
- Location: Chinar Bagh, Pampore, Pulwama District, Jammu and Kashmir 192121; India
- Coordinates: 33.9988°N 74.8950°E
- Elevation: 1,592.867 metres (5,225.94 ft)
- System: Indian Railways station
- Owner: Indian Railways
- Operator: Northern Railway
- Line: Jammu–Baramulla line
- Platforms: 2
- Tracks: 2

Construction
- Parking: Yes
- Accessible: Yes

Other information
- Status: Active
- Station code: PMPE
- Zone(s): Northern Railway
- Division(s): Jammu

History
- Opened: 2008
Location
- Location within India Location within Jammu and Kashmir

Pampore railway station is the railway station on the Jammu–Baramulla line in the Indian union territory of Jammu and Kashmir. It is one of the four stations in Pulwama district, the others being Awantipora railway station, Kakapora railway station and Panchgam railway station respectively.

== Location ==
The station is situated in notified area of Pampore, Pulwama, Jammu and Kashmir. It belongs to the North Central Railway Zone of Indian Railways.

== History ==
The station has been built as part of the Jammu–Baramulla line megaproject, intending to link the Kashmir Valley with Jammu Tawi and the rest of the Indian railway network.

== Design ==
The station features Kashmiri wood architecture, with an intended ambiance of a royal court designed to complement the local surroundings of the station. Station signage is predominantly in Urdu, English and Hindi.

== Reduced level ==
The R.L. of the station is 1592 m above mean sea level.

== See also ==
- Srinagar railway station
