= Arihal =

- Village
- Location in Jammu and Kashmir, India Arihal (India)
- Coordinates: 33.48°N 74.53°E
- Country: India
- State: Jammu and Kashmir
- District: Pulwama

Languages
  - Official: Kashmiri, Urdu, Hindi, Dogri, English
- Time zone: UTC+5:30 (IST)
- PIN: 192302
- Telephone code: 01933
- Vehicle registration: JK13

Arihal is a village in the union territory of Jammu and Kashmir, India. It is situated at 33.48°N 74.53°E, part of the Pulwama district. Pulwama is the nearest city at approximately 7km distance, and is important for the village's major economic activities.

The total geographical area of village is 514.8 hectares. Ari Hal has a total population of 4,815, of which 2,457 are male and 2,358 are female. It contains about 779 houses. There are two public high schools, while various private schools have been established in the past decade.
