= Pari Gam Jagir =

Village in Jammu and Kashmir

Parigam Paergaum
- Village
- Pari Gam Jagir
- Location in Jammu and Kashmir Parigam (India)
- Coordinates: 33.9344°N 74.8843°E
- Country: India
- Union Territory: Jammu and Kashmir
- District: Pulwama
- Tehsil: Parigam

Area
  - Total: 433.2 ha (1,070 acres)

Population
  - Total: 4,530

Languages
  - Official: Kashmiri, Urdu, Hindi, English
- Time zone: UTC+05:30 (IST)
- PIN: 192301
- Vehicle registration: JK-13
- Literacy: 51.17%
- Village Code: 003106

Pari Gam Jagir, commonly known as Paergaum or Parigam Jagir, is a village in Pulwama district, Jammu & Kashmir, India.

Pari Gam Jagir village is located 8 km far from Pulwama district headquarter. According to the 2011 Census of India, the village has a total population of 4,530 people which includes 2,296 males and 2,234 females with an overall literacy rate of 51.17%.
