= Sanger Wani =

Sanger Wani Sangerwani
- Village
- Location in Jammu and Kashmir, India
- Coordinates: 33.81°N 74.74°E
- Country: India
- Union territory: Jammu and Kashmir
- District: Pulwama

Government
  - Type: rural local government and is part of rajpora vidhan sabha constituency
  - Body: panchayat
- Highest elevation: 2,400 m (7,900 ft)
- Lowest elevation: 2,200 m (7,200 ft)

Population (2011)
  - Total: 5,558

Languages :gojri, pahadi, kashmiri
  - Official: Kashmiri, Urdu, Hindi, Dogri, English
- Time zone: UTC+5:30 (IST)
- PIN Code: 192301
- Literacy: 26.74%
- Distance from Srinagar International Airport: 37 kilometres (23 mi)
- Distance from Pulwama: 26 kilometres (16 mi)

Sanger Wani or Sangerwani is a village in Pulwama district of the Indian union territory of Jammu and Kashmir.

== Geography ==
It is located 8 km (5.0 mi) north of Pakharpora Fire and Emergency Station. The nearest airport, Sheikh ul-Alam International Airport, is 40 km (25 mi) from the village.

== Population ==
As per 2011 Census of India, Sangerwani village had a population of 5558 of which 2917 are males and 2641 are females. The population lives in 1013 households. Its literacy rate is 26.74%.

== Economy ==
The main occupation of the Sangerwani people is fruit cultivation. Others people are engaged in "marginal" activity.
