= Midoora =

Piedmont Village

Midoora Medora, Medur
- Village
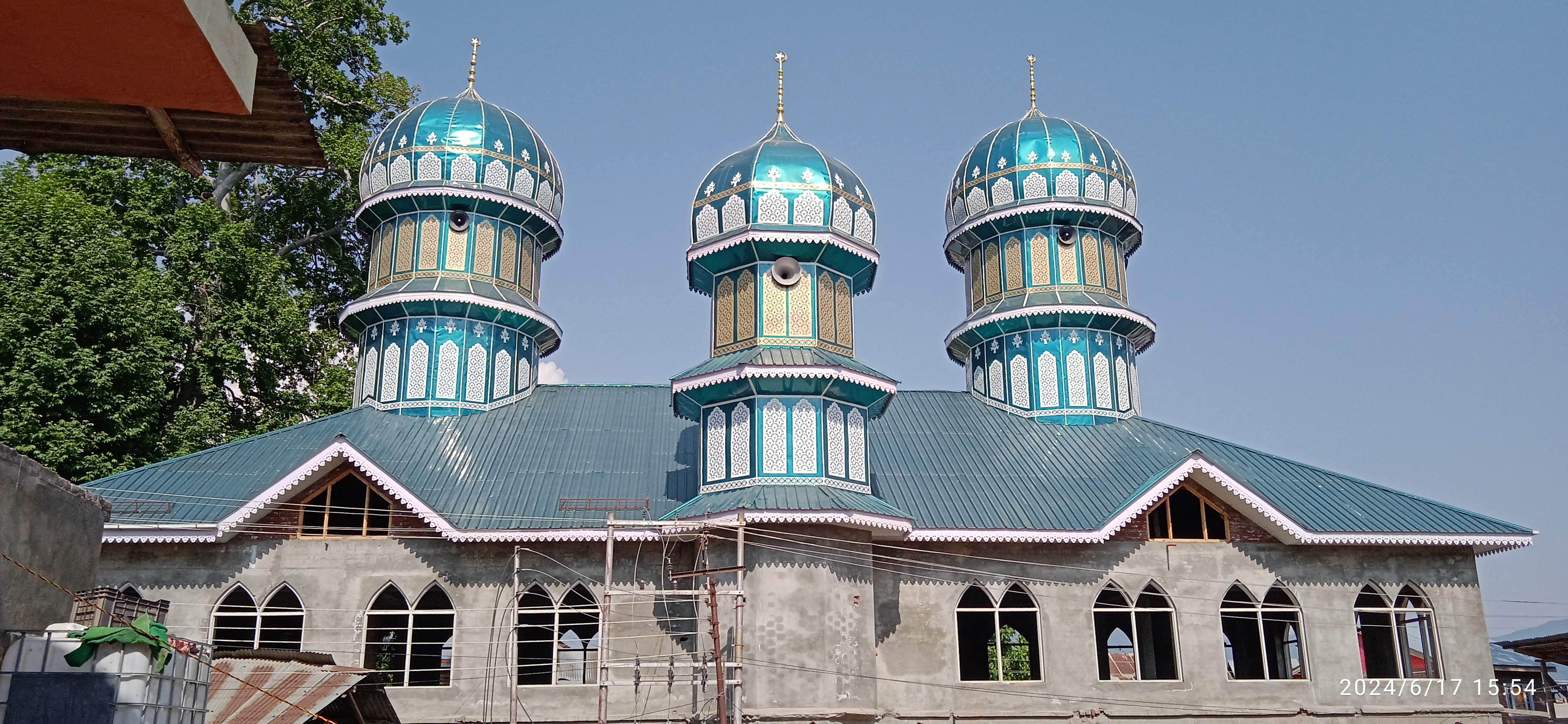
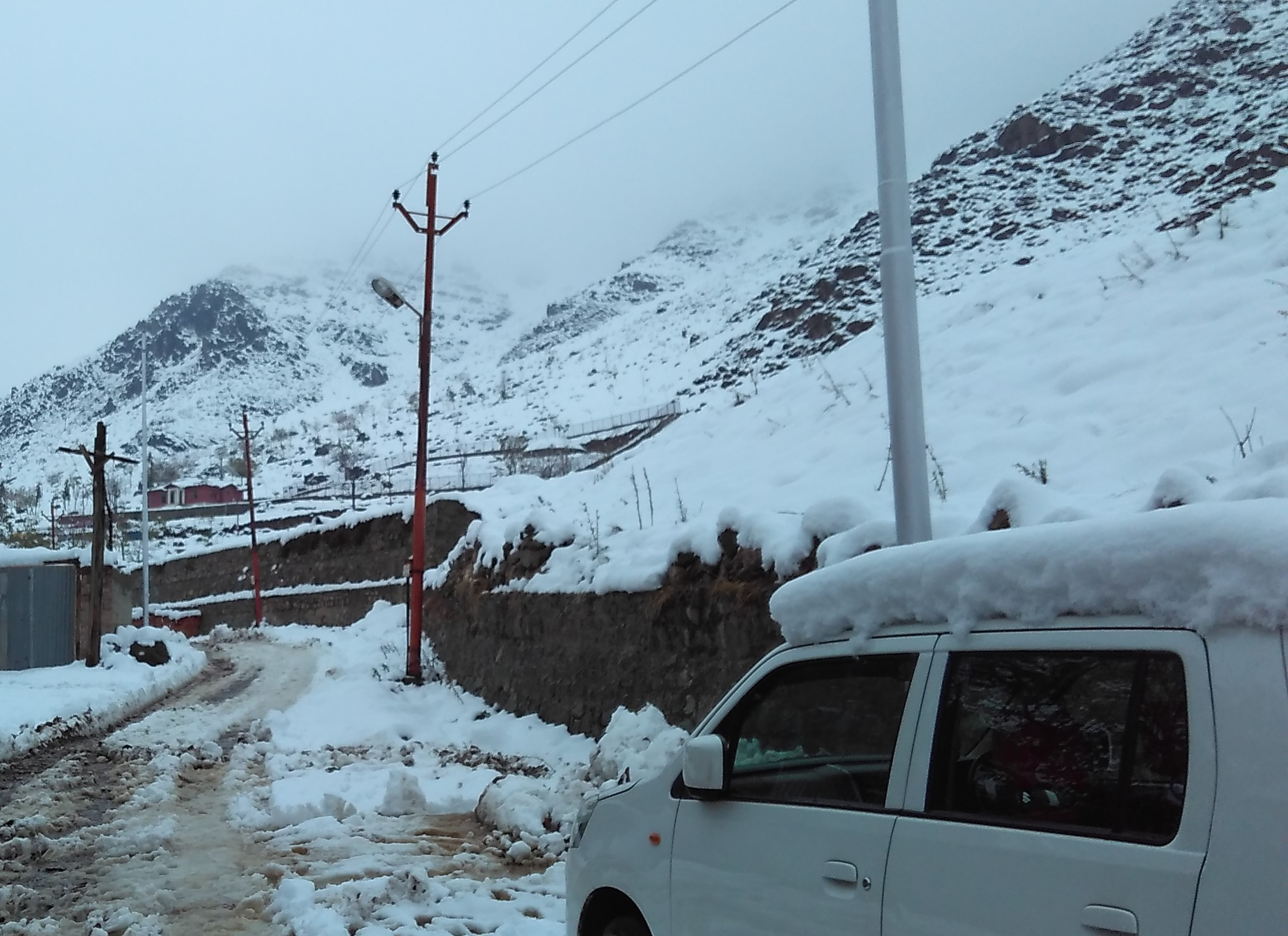
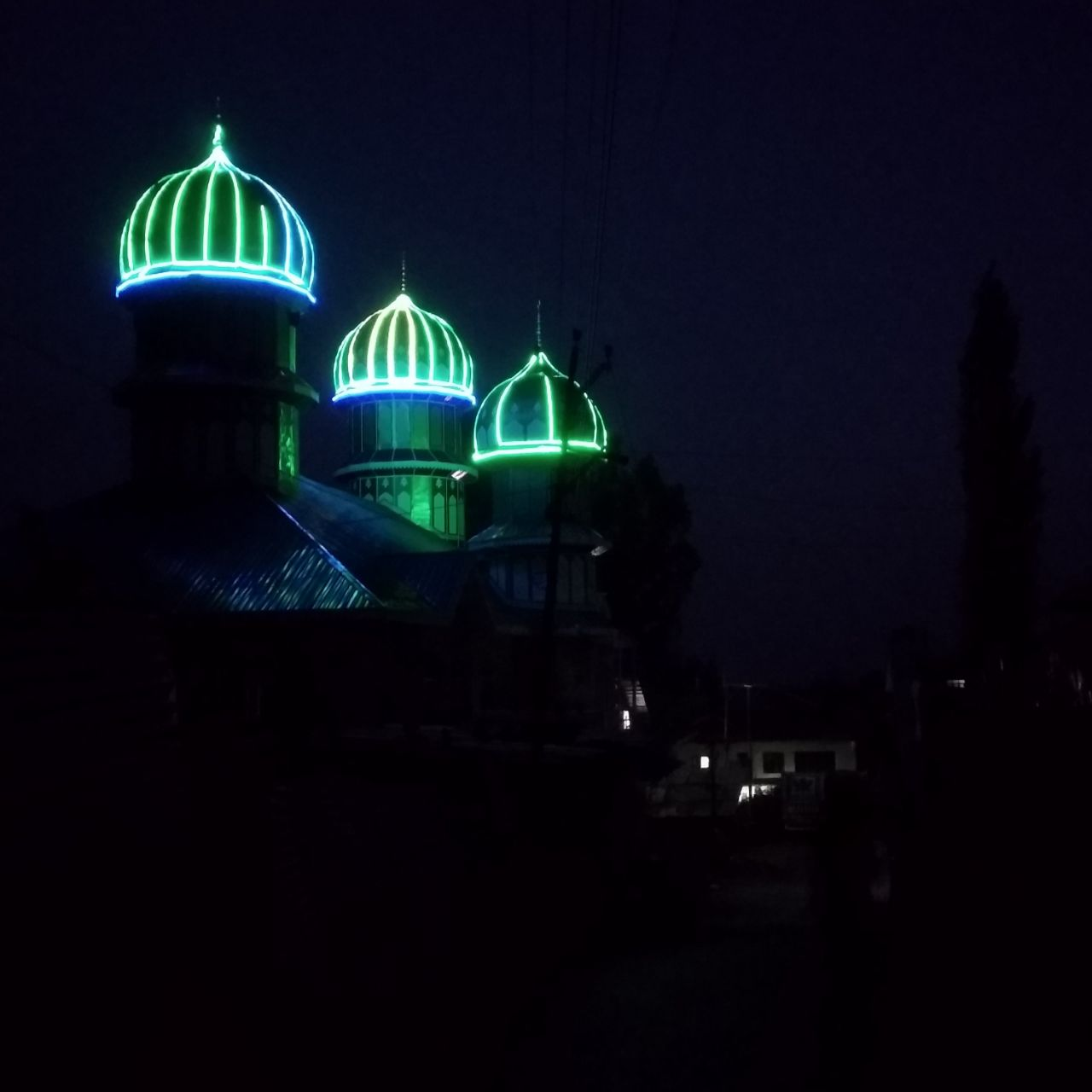
- From the top: 1) Jalali Jamia Masjid 2) Gori'wan in winters 3) Jalali Jamia Masjid(at night). Midoora
- Interactive map of Midoora
- Location in Jammu and Kashmir Midoora (India)
- Coordinates: 33.934236°N 75.060591°E
- Union Territory: Jammu & Kashmir
- District: Pulwama
- Tehsil: Awantipora
- Established: 1574; 452 years ago
- Founded by: Baba Yusuf Jalali

Government
  - Type: Panchayati Raj
  - Body: Gram Panchayat
  - Sarpanch: Vacant
  - Village Headman: Quisar Iqbal Yatoo

Area
  - Total: 8.5 km^{2} (3.3 sq mi)
- Elevation: 1,700 m (5,600 ft)

Population (2011)
  - Total: 4,441
  - Density: 520/km^{2} (1,400/sq mi)
- Demonym: English : Med'reuk

Languages
  - Official: Kashmiri, Urdu, English
- Time zone: UTC+5:30 (IST)
- PIN: 192123
- Telephone code: 01933
- Vehicle registration: JK 13
- Sex ratio: 927♀/1000♂
- Literacy: 70.05%
- Ethnicity: Kashmiris

Midoora (Urdu: میڈورہ; also known as Midur, میڈُر) is a piedmont, agglomerated rural settlement in the Awantipora Tehsil of Pulwama district, in Indian-administered union territory of Jammu and Kashmir. It lies approximately 30 km south of Srinagar, 7 km from Awantipora, and 8 km from the town of Tral. To the northwest of the village stands the Wasturwan.

== Toponym ==
The name Midoora derives from Midur, which in turn comes from Modur, meaning 'sweet'.

== History ==
=== Early Modern History ===
About 450 years ago, Midoora was sparsely populated, with the land used mainly to graze livestock. According to Local tradition, in the second half of the 16th century a man named Baba Yusuf Jalali (d. 12 Muharram 989 AH/ 25 March 1580 CE), originally from Haba Kadal, founded the first major settlement in the region. He arrived in the mountainous region of Wasturwan via Nishat and spent much of his ascetic life there, where he dedicated himself to spiritual practices, sustaining himself on goat milk and Wopal haakh ( a type of Kale).

Later on, he adopted his niece, Shah Begum, and arranged her marriage to his disciple, Mir Syed Hassan Shah Bukhari - great-grandson of Syed Hassan Mantaqi of Awantipora. The growing Syed community eventually attracted settlement of professional communities, gradually shaping Midoora into the more diverse village.

== Climate ==
Midoora has a moderate climate, characteristic of the Kashmir Valley. It can be described as hot in summers and cold, snowy in winters. The hottest month is July and the coldest are December–January.

== Demographics ==
At the 2011 Census of India, Midoora had a population of 4441. The sex ratio of the Village is 927 with 2305 males and 2136 females. There are a total of 580 households. The total number of children under the age of 6 is 1302. A total of 113 people constituting 2.54% of the total population belonged to Schedule Tribe (ST).

The Village recorded 2,199 literates in 2011, corresponding to a literacy rate of 70.05%.

Gender pie chart (Census 2011)
1. Male (51.9%)
2. Female (48.1%)

== Education ==
There are many primary, middle and a couple of secondary schools in service. Some notable schools are:

- Government High School
- Jalali English Medium High School
- Government Middle School
- Modern Public Mission School
- Al-Furqan Public School

== Notable people ==
- Abdul Gani Ahanger - Ex-Director SKIMS & Ex-Officio Secretary to Government.
- Mohit Bhan - Politician, Current PDP spokesperson, Social activist.

== Gallery ==
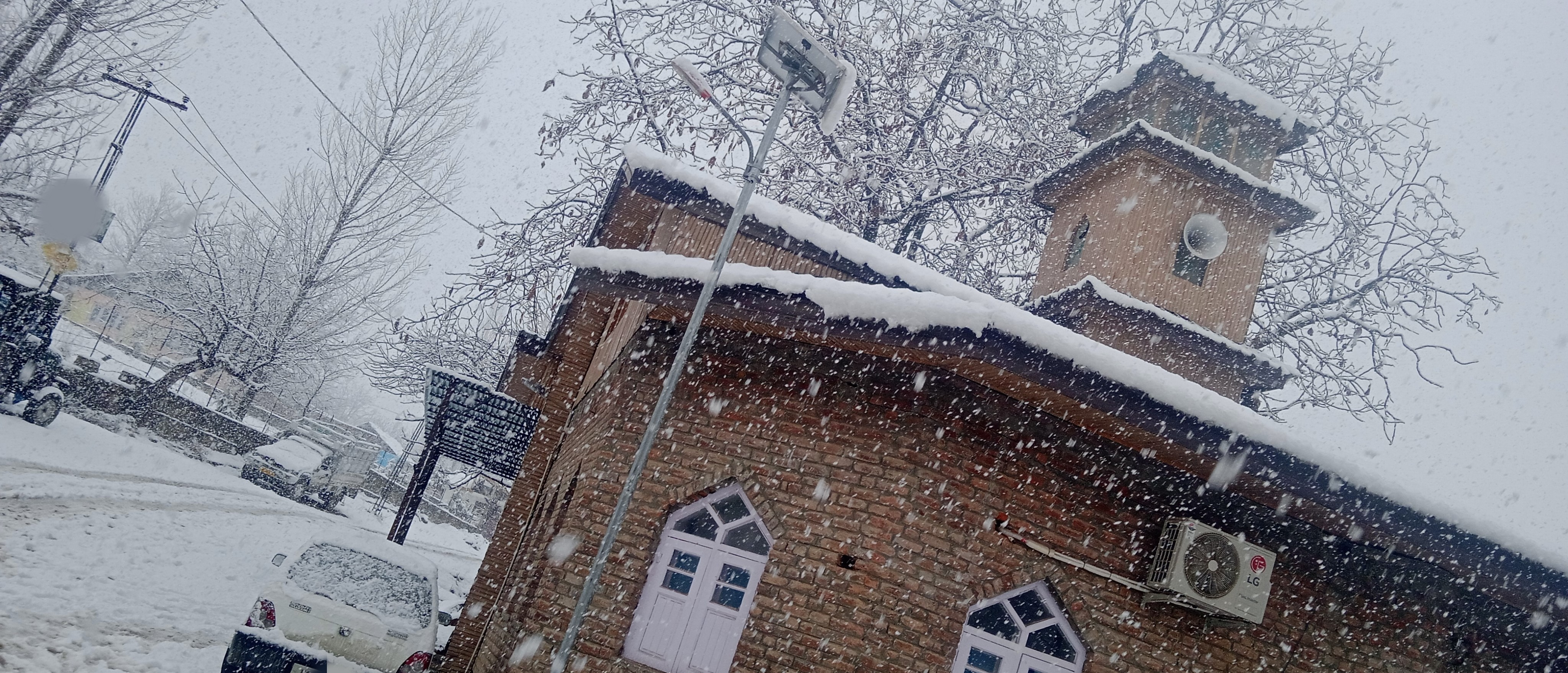
Bilal Masjid

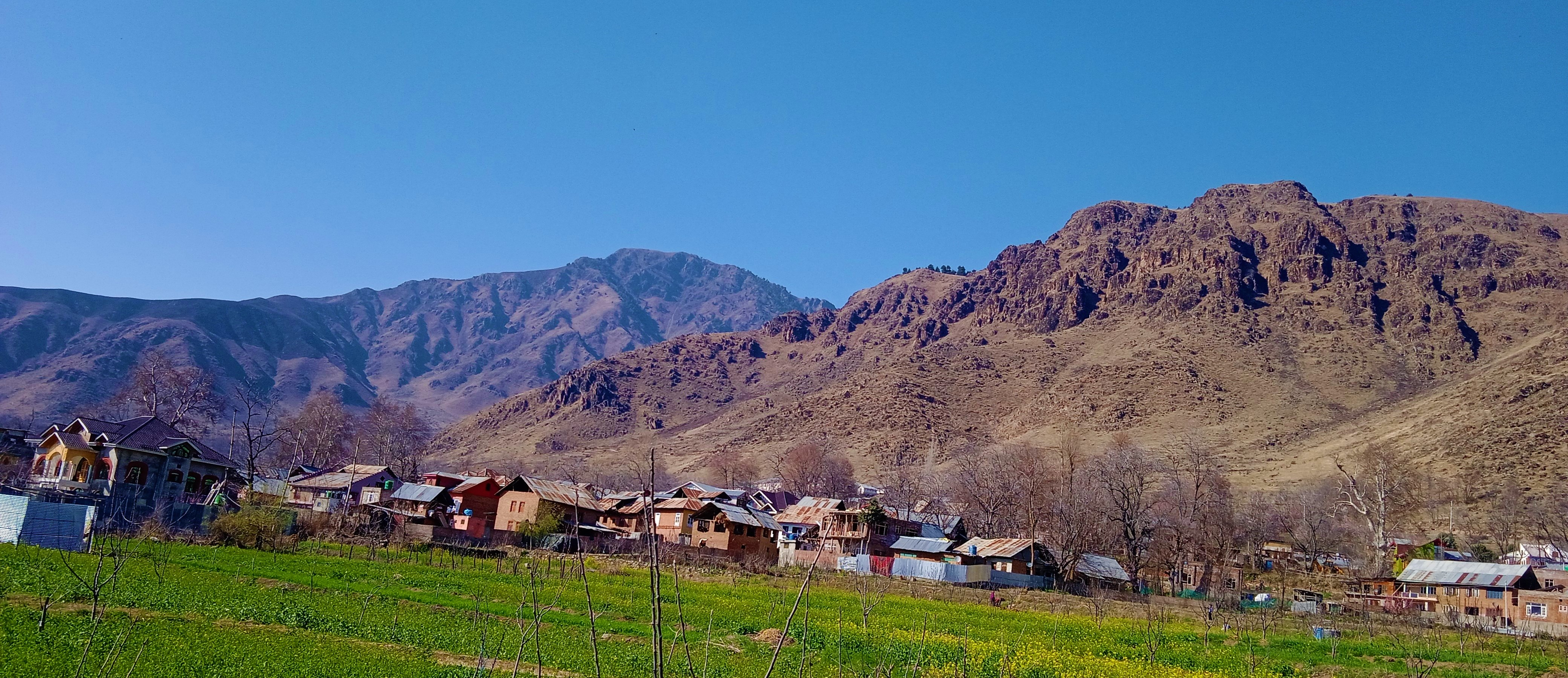
Wasturvan in Background

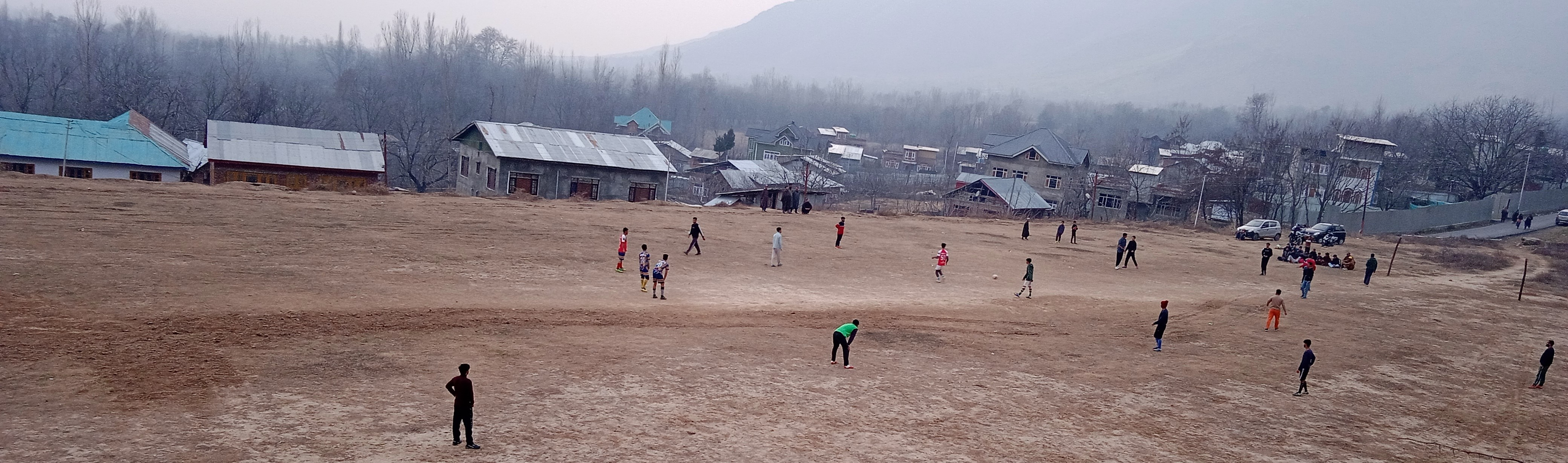
Sports ground
