= Sirnoo =

Village in Jammu and Kashmir, India

Sirnoo is a small village which is located 1 km from the town of Pulwama, Kashmir, India.
