= Khaigam =

Village in Jammu and Kashmir, India

- Village
- Location in Jammu and Kashmir, India Khaigam (India)
- Coordinates: 33.8152°N 74.7549°E
- Country: India
- Union territory: Jammu and Kashmir
- District: Pulwama

Area
  - Total: 387.9 ha (959 acres)

Population (2011)
  - Total: 3,122
  - Density: 804.8/km^{2} (2,085/sq mi)

Languages
  - Official: Kashmiri, Urdu, Hindi, Dogri,
- Time zone: UTC+5:30 (IST)
- PIN: 191112
- Vehicle registration: JK-13
- Website: Pulwama

Khaigam is a census village and Gram Panchayat in Pulwama district, Jammu & Kashmir, India.

According to the 2011 Census of India, Khaigam has a total population of 3,122 people including 1,588 males and 1,534 females with a literacy rate of 27.19%.
