= Lelhar =

Village in India

- Village
- Location in Jammu and Kashmir, India Lelhar (India)
- Coordinates: 33.9552°N 74.9530°E
- Country: India
- State: Jammu & Kashmir
- District: Pulwama

Area
  - Total: 549.6 ha (1,358 acres)
- Elevation: 1,383 m (4,537 ft)

Population (2011)
  - Total: 3,799

Languages
  - Official: Kashmiri, Urdu, Hindi, Dogri, English
- Time zone: UTC+5:30 (IST)
- PIN: 192304
- Vehicle registration: JK-13
- Website: pulwama.nic.in

Lelhar is a census village in Pulwama district, Jammu & Kashmir, India.

According to the 2011 Census of India, Lelhar village has a total population of 3,799 including 1,964 males and 1,835 females and has a literacy rate of 50.12%.

The people of the Lelhar village's livelihood are based on cultivation.
