= Trichal =

Village in Jammu and Kashmir, India

Trichal Tritshal (ترٛیژھٕل)
- Village
- Location in Jammu and Kashmir, India Trichal (India)
- Coordinates: 33.8468°N 74.9185°E
- Country: India
- Union territory: Jammu and Kashmir
- District: Pulwama

Area
  - Total: 343.2 ha (848 acres)

Population (2011)
  - Total: 2,915
  - Density: 849.4/km^{2} (2,200/sq mi)

Languages
  - Official: Kashmiri, Urdu, Hindi, language
- Time zone: UTC+5:30 (IST)
- PIN: 192301

Trichal , also known as Tritshal (ترٛیژھٕل) is a village in Pulwama district, Jammu & Kashmir, India. As per the 2011 Census of India, Trichal village has a total population of 2,915 including 1,528 males and 1,387 females with a literacy rate of 54.27%. There are two private schools among one is a high school and one Government middle school in the village. The most common activities in the village are horticulture and agriculture. there are also two shrines of Muslims and also two hindu temples.
