= Government Degree College, Pulwama =

College in Jammu and Kashmit, India

Government Degree College Pulwama
- Motto in English: Seek Knowledge
- Type: Degree college
- Established: 1986
- Vice-Chancellor: Nilofer Khan
- Principal: Haris Izhar Tantray
- Location: Pulwama, Jammu and Kashmir, India
- Campus: Urban
- Language: Urdu and English
- Website: www.dcpulwama.edu.in

The Government Degree College, Pulwama also known as GDC Pulwama, is a college located on a 66 kanal (8.25-acre [3.34 ha]) campus in Pulwama in the Indian union territory of Jammu and Kashmir. It was established in the year 1986. It is affiliated to University of Kashmir, and is recognised by UGC under 2(f) and 12(b) of UGC Act 1956.The college is accredited A by NAAC.

== Location ==
The college is located on Pulwama – Newa Road at a distance of 2.5 km (1.6 mi) from Pulwama City Bus Stand and 34 km (21 mi) south of Srinagar. The college is presently spread over 66 kanal (8.25 acres [3.34 ha]) of land through which a perennial fresh water stream flows bestowing scenic beauty to the campus.

== Establishment ==
Department of Higher Education Govt. of J&K established the college under the Chief-Ministership of Dr. Farooq Abdullah in the year 1986.

== Overview and history ==
GDC Pulwama started its academic operations in the year 1986, from middle school Pulwama for 15 years. It started with a few Arts subjects at that time. As many as 252 students were enrolled for academic session 1986. The college was shifted to the present campus in May 2001. Degree College Pulwama is one of the biggest colleges in the J&K State enrolling more than 6000 students for an academic year.

== Courses ==
The college offers bachelor courses at undergraduate level in four streams: Science, Arts, Social Science and Commerce. Besides these, bachelors course in Computer Applications for which selection is made through written test conducted by the University of Kashmir is also offered.

=== Bachelor Courses ===
- Bachelor of Arts
- Bachelor of Science (Medical)
- Bachelor of Science (Non Medical)
- Bachelor of Commerce
- Bachelor of Computer Applications
- Bachelor of Business Administration
