= Awantipur Air Force Station =

- IATA: none; ICAO: VIAW

Summary
- Airport type: Military
- Operator: Indian Air Force
- Location: Awantipora, Jammu and Kashmir, India
- Elevation AMSL: 2,068 ft / 630 m
- Coordinates: 33°52′35″N 074°58′32″E

Map

Runways
Direction	Length		Surface
Direction	m	ft	Surface
12/30	3,200	10,500	Concrete
- Source: ourairports.com

Awantipur Air Force Station (ICAO: VIAW) of the Indian Air Force (IAF) is located in Awantipora in Jammu and Kashmir, India.

It is situated near Awantipora at Malangpora about 5 km from Pulwama town.

== Facilities ==
The airport is situated at an elevation of 1,644 metres (5,394 ft) above mean sea level. It has one runway with concrete surfaces: 12/30 measuring 10,500 by 150 feet (3,200 by 46 m).
