= Awantipora railway station =

Railway station in Jammu and Kashmir, India

Awantipora Pulwama Railway Station

General information
- Location: Awantipora, Pulwama, Jammu and Kashmir
- Coordinates: 33.8879°N 74.9919°E
- Elevation: 1,596.123 m (5,236.62 ft)
- System: Indian Railways station
- Owner: Ministry of Railways, Indian Railways
- Line: Northern railway
- Platforms: 3
- Tracks: 4

Construction
- Structure type: Standard on-ground station
- Platform levels: High level passenger platform
- Parking: Yes

Other information
- Status: Active
- Station code: ATPA
- Fare zone: Northern railway

History
- Opened: 2008
Location
- Location within India Location within Jammu and Kashmir

Awantipora Pulwama Railway Station is situated in notified area of Awantipora in the Pulwama district. It is the headquarters of Pulwama division of Northern railway zone. It is one of the four stations in Pulwama district, the others being Pampore railway station, Kakapora railway station and Panchgam railway station respectively.

== History ==
The station has been built as part of the Jammu–Baramulla line megaproject, intending to link the Kashmir Valley with Jammu Tawi and the rest of the Indian railway network.

== Design ==
Like every other station in this mega project, this station also features Kashmiri wood architecture, with an intended ambience of a royal court which is designed to complement the local surroundings to the station. Station signage is predominantly in Urdu, English and Hindi. (Note: See Banihal railway station)

== See also ==
- Srinagar railway station
- Anantnag railway station
