= Chursoo Awantipora =

Village in Jammu and Kashmir, India

Chersoo
- Village
- Location in Jammu and Kashmir, India Chersoo (India)
- Coordinates: 33.885°N 75.025°E
- Country: India
- State: Jammu & Kashmir
- District: Pulwama
- Tehsil: Awantipora
- Elevation: 1,580 m (5,180 ft)

Population (2001)
  - Total: 3,762

Languages
  - Official: Kashmiri, Urdu, Hindi, Dogri, English
- Time zone: UTC+5:30 (IST)
- PIN: 192122
- Vehicle registration: JK 13
- Website: pulwama.nic.in

Chersoo is a village located 4 km from Awantipora town in the Pulwama district of the Kashmir Valley of Jammu and Kashmir, India. It is situated on the banks of Jhelum River. The Srinagar-Jammu National Highway passes through the village.

== Census details ==
It has a population of 3,762 souls. The number of literates are 1,570. The number of households are 486. It has a sex ratio of 1,007 (approx.). The total number of workers are 1,436.
