= Mohit Bhan =

Indian politician from Jammu and Kashmir

- Born: Srinagar, Jammu and Kashmir, India
- Occupations: Politician, Spokesperson
- Political party: Jammu and Kashmir Peoples Democratic Party

Mohit Bhan is an Indian politician who currently serves as the spokesperson of the Jammu and Kashmir Peoples Democratic Party and was nominated as the General Secretary (Organisation) of the party's youth wing by Youth Wing President Waheed Para in 2022, a position he served till 2024. He had joined PDP in July 2019 in the presence of Mehbooba Mufti.

Mohit was born in Srinagar to Kashmiri Pandith parents, who were originally from the Midoora village of Tral.
