= Aripal Tehsil =

Aripal
- Village/Tehsil
- Location in Jammu and Kashmir, India Aripal (India)
- Coordinates: 34.017651°N 75.071858°E
- Country: India
- Union territory: Jammu and Kashmir
- District: Pulwama

Languages
  - Official: Kashmiri, Urdu, Hindi, Dogri, English
- Time zone: UTC+5:30 (IST)
- Vehicle registration: JK13
- Tehsildar: Zubair Ahmad (in charge)
- Website: pulwama.gov.in

Aripal is a subtehsil in the Tral area of Indian part of Jammu and Kashmir. It is one of the eight tehsils of Pulwama district, and was created when Pulwama changed from a four-tehsil structure to an eight-tehsil structure. The administration of Aripal Tehsil is subdivided into six patwar halqas (revenue circles).

== Villages in Aripal tehsil ==
The villages along with their patwar halqa (revenue circle) in Aripal tehsil are listed below:

| Village | Patwar Halqa |
|---|---|
| Nargistan | Satoora |
| Gutroo | Satoora |
| Satoora | Satoora |
| Hajinnad | Satoora |
| Puranigam | Satoora |
| Gulistan | Satoora |
| Khanagund | Khanagund |
| Jawarpora | Khanagund |
| Deedarpora | Khanagund |
| Aripal | Aripal |
| Dar Ganie Gund | Aripal |
| Heevan | Aripal |
| Dharamgund | Aripal |
| Pathamgam Gadpora | Aripal |
| Syedabad | Syedabad |
| Wagad | Syedabad |
| Lorrow | Lorrow |
| Seer | Lorrow |
| Handoora | Lorrow |
| Lurgam | Lurgam |
| Panzoo | Lurgam |
| Nadir | Lurgam |

== Aripal Spring ==
Aripal spring is a freshwater spring located in Aripal tehsil of Tral. The spring is located around 11 km from Sub-district headquarters Tral. The spring is surrounded by large tracts of trees and a chain of hills. The Aripal spring is now being developed as a tourist resort as it has tourism generating potential. Many people from Tral and adjacent towns visit the spring during summers particularly in July and August to enjoy the amiable weather around the spring. In summers, when almost every place is sizzling in day heat, the Aripal area witnesses an amiable weather which attracts the people of Tral and other areas to throng this very spring. This spring is also home to a few varieties of fish which adds to its beauty. The spring has not been given proper attention by the tourism department and thus this spring awaits proper development and beautification.

== Nearby Tourist Attractions ==
Nagaberan (Upper Dachigam), Tarsar Lake/Marsar Lake and Hajin are the nearby tourist destinations of Aripal.
