= Dooni Pahoo =

- Village
- Location within Jammu and Kashmir
- Coordinates: 33.7458°N 75.0887°E
- Country: India
- State: Jammu and Kashmir
- District: Anantnag district

Area
  - Total: 119 ha (290 acres)

Population (2011)
  - Total: 1,402
  - Density: 1,180/km^{2} (3,050/sq mi)

Languages
  - Official: Kashmiri, Urdu, Hindi, Dogri, English
- Time zone: UTC+5:30 (IST)
- PIN: 192101

Dooni Pahoo is a village in the Anantnag district of Jammu and Kashmir, India.

== Demographics ==
According to Census 2011 information the location code or village code of Dooni Pahoo village is 003733. Dooni Pahoo village is located in Anantnag Tehsil of Anantnag district in Jammu & Kashmir, India. Anantnag is nearest town to Dooni Pahoo village.

== Tourist places near Dooni Pahoo ==
Aru Valley, Betaab Valley, Amarnath Caves, Martand Sun Temple, Aishmuqam Shrine, Uma Devi, Kherbawani Asthapan are the major tourist attractions near to Dooni Pahoo.

== Agriculture ==
Rice, maize, wheat, pulses, fodder, oil seeds, potato and barley are the major crops that are cultivated mostly in the area.

== Dooni Pahoo Cuisine ==
Rogan Josh, Yakhni, Dum Olav, Matschgand, Kashmiri Muji Gaad, Aab Gosht, Goshtaba, Modur Pulav, Lyodur Tschaman, Momos, Thukpa, Skyu, Khambir, Paba and Tangdur, Thenthuk, Morel, Palov, Madra, Oria, Maani, Khameera, Katha Meat, Shasha, Kasrod, Timru-di-Chatni, Shiri Pulav, Mitha Bhat are few of the many varieties of Dooni Pahoo.

== Transport ==
=== By Rail ===
Sadura Railway Station & Anantnag Railway Station are the very nearby railway stations to Dooni Pahoo. However Jammu Tawi Railway Station is a major railway station 243 km from Dooni Pahoo.
