= Rahmoo =

Town in Jammu and Kashmir, India

- Town
- ROMU
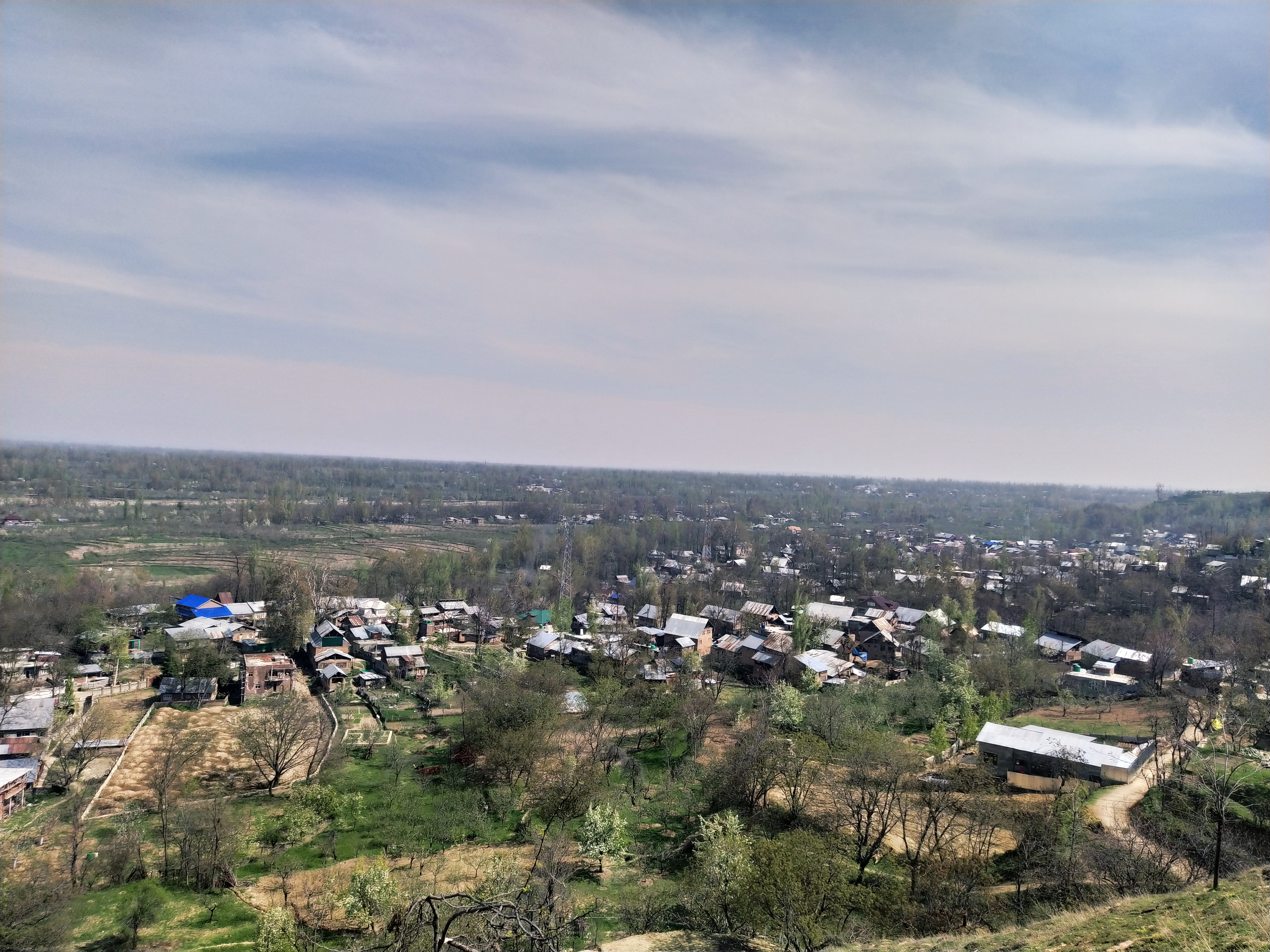
- High altitude view of Rahmoo

- Location in Jammu and Kashmir, India Rahmoo (India)
- Coordinates: 33.8540803°N 74.8288428°E
- Administered by: India
- Founder: Hazrat Ruma Reshi(RA)
- Named for: Romush River and Hazrat Ruma Reshi(RA)

Area
  - Total: 1,501 ha (3,710 acres)
- Elevation: 1,805 m (5,922 ft)

Population (2011)
  - Total: 5,030

Languages
  - Official: Kashmiri, Urdu, Hindi, Dogri, English
- Time zone: UTC+5:30 (IST)
- Postal Code: 192301
- Vehicle registration: JK13
- Website: pulwama.nic.in

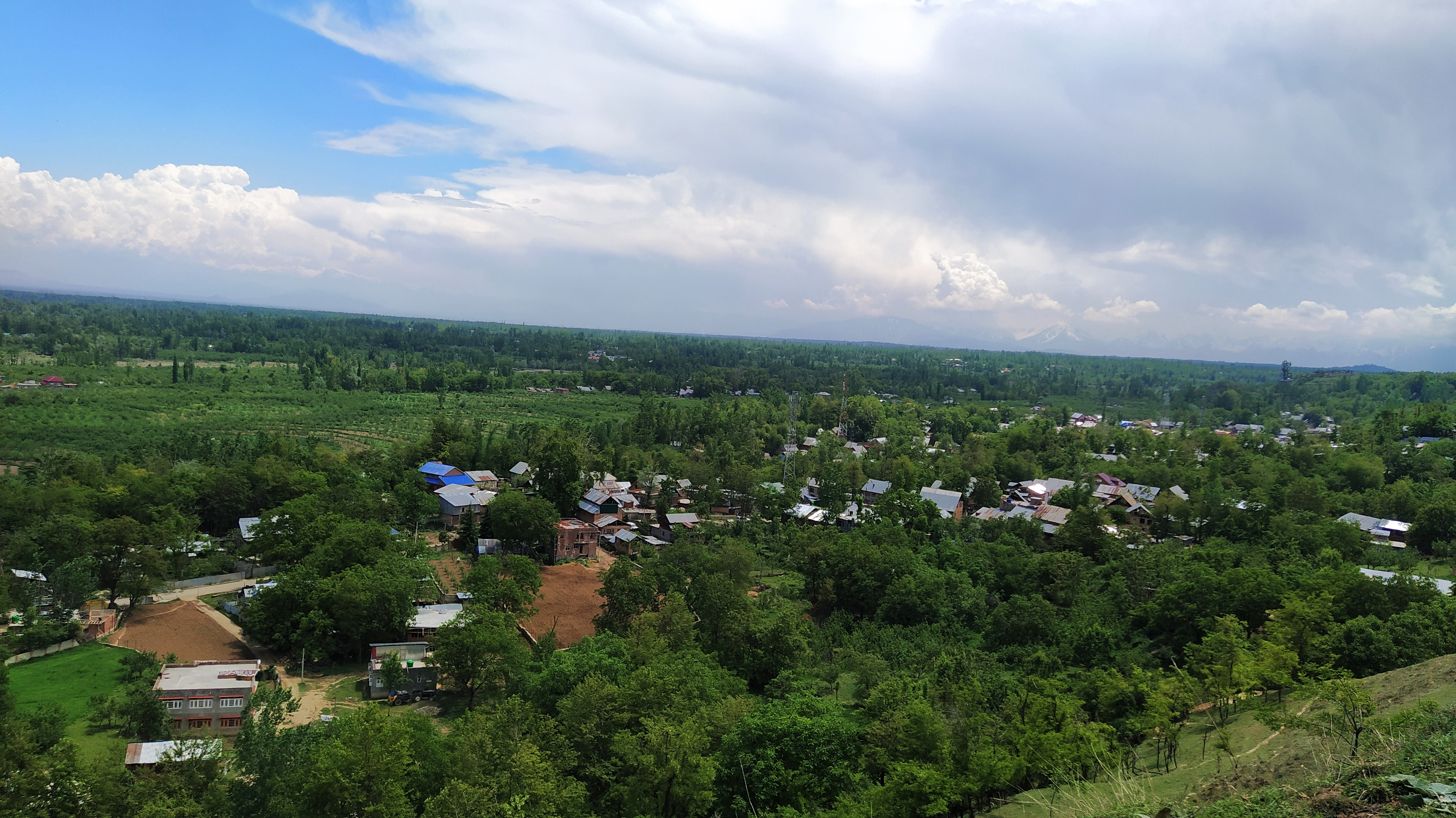
Lower portion of Rahmoo as seen from Kanjikoot.

Rahmoo, officially Romu, is a small town 6 kilometres (3.7 mi) west of Pulwama in the Indian-administered Union Territory of Jammu and Kashmir, believed to be founded by a famous Islamic saint namely Hazrat Ruma Reshi (RA). It is one of the largest villages in the district by area and population. It is located 25 kilometres (16 mi) from summer capital Srinagar. Rahmoo is situated 5,922 feet (1,805 m) above sea level. The village is directly administered by district administration Pulwama.

== Demography ==
As per the 2011 Census of India, the population of Rahmoo is 5,030, with 2,603 males and 2,427 females. 15.19% of the population is under the age of 6. In 2011, the literacy rate of Rahmoo was 39.85%, with male literacy at 47.61% and female literacy rate at 31.64%.

== Education and health ==
- Sheikh Ul Aalam Secondary Educational Institute(SAEI Rahmoo)
- Government Middle School
- Government Primary School
- Islamic English Medium School
- Public Health Centre
- Government Higher Secondary School
- Kids Kingdom Public School
