= Awantipora =

Awantipora Woontpor Avantipur, Awantipur, Aavantipur
- Town
- Awantipora
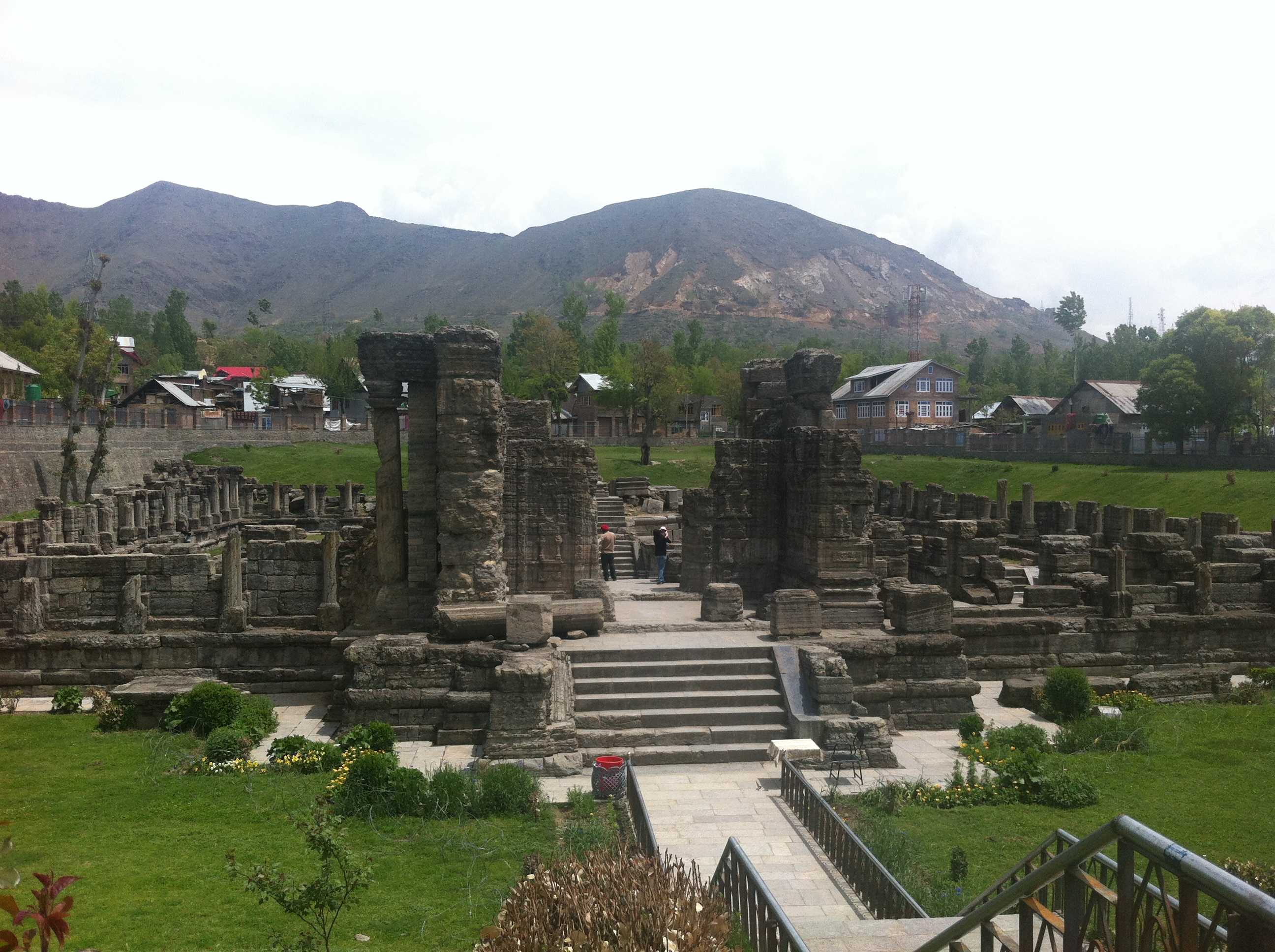
- Remains of Avantiswami Temple

- Location in Jammu and Kashmir, India Awantipora (India)
- Coordinates: 33.9232602°N 75.012846°E
- Country: India
- Union territory: Jammu and Kashmir
- District: Pulwama
- Named for: Raja Avantivarman
- Elevation: 1,582 m (5,190 ft)

Population (2011)
  - Total: 12,647

Languages
  - Official: Kashmiri, Urdu, Hindi, Dogri, English
- Time zone: UTC+5:30 (IST)
- PIN: 192122
- Telephone code: 01933
- Vehicle registration: JK13
- Sex ratio: ♂/♀
- Website: pulwama.gov.in

Awantipora (Urdu pronunciation: [əʋənt̪iːpoːɾɑː]) or Avantipur or Aavantipur, known as Woontpor (Kashmiri pronunciation: [ʋũːtʲpoːr]) in Kashmiri, is a town, just opposite of Pulwama city, on the banks of the river Jhelum in the Pulwama district of Jammu and Kashmir, India.

It is on the Jammu–Srinagar National Highway (now called the NH 44), south of Srinagar and north of Anantnag. Awantipora railway station connects it to 119 km long Jammu-Baramulla line. Awantipora is a subdistrict of Pulwama district.

Awantipur Air Force Station is situated near Awantipora at Malangpora about 5 km from Pulwama town.

== History ==
The town of Avantipura was founded by Avantivarman the Kashmiri Hindu ruler, who was the first king of the Utpala dynasty and ruled Kashmir from 855 to 883 AD. Avantivarman built a Hindu temple in Awantipora dedicated to Vishnu called "Avantisvamin" before he became king, and during his reign he built a second Hindu temple in Awantipora called "Avantisvara" dedicated to Shiva. Both temples were built in spacious rectangular paved courtyards. They were destroyed in the Middle Ages. They were excavated by the archeologist Daya Ram Sahni in the early 20th century. The Avantisvamin temple is located at 33°55′24″N 75°00′46″E and Avantisvara is at 33°55′41″N 75°00′16″E. They are protected and maintained by the Archaeological Survey of India.

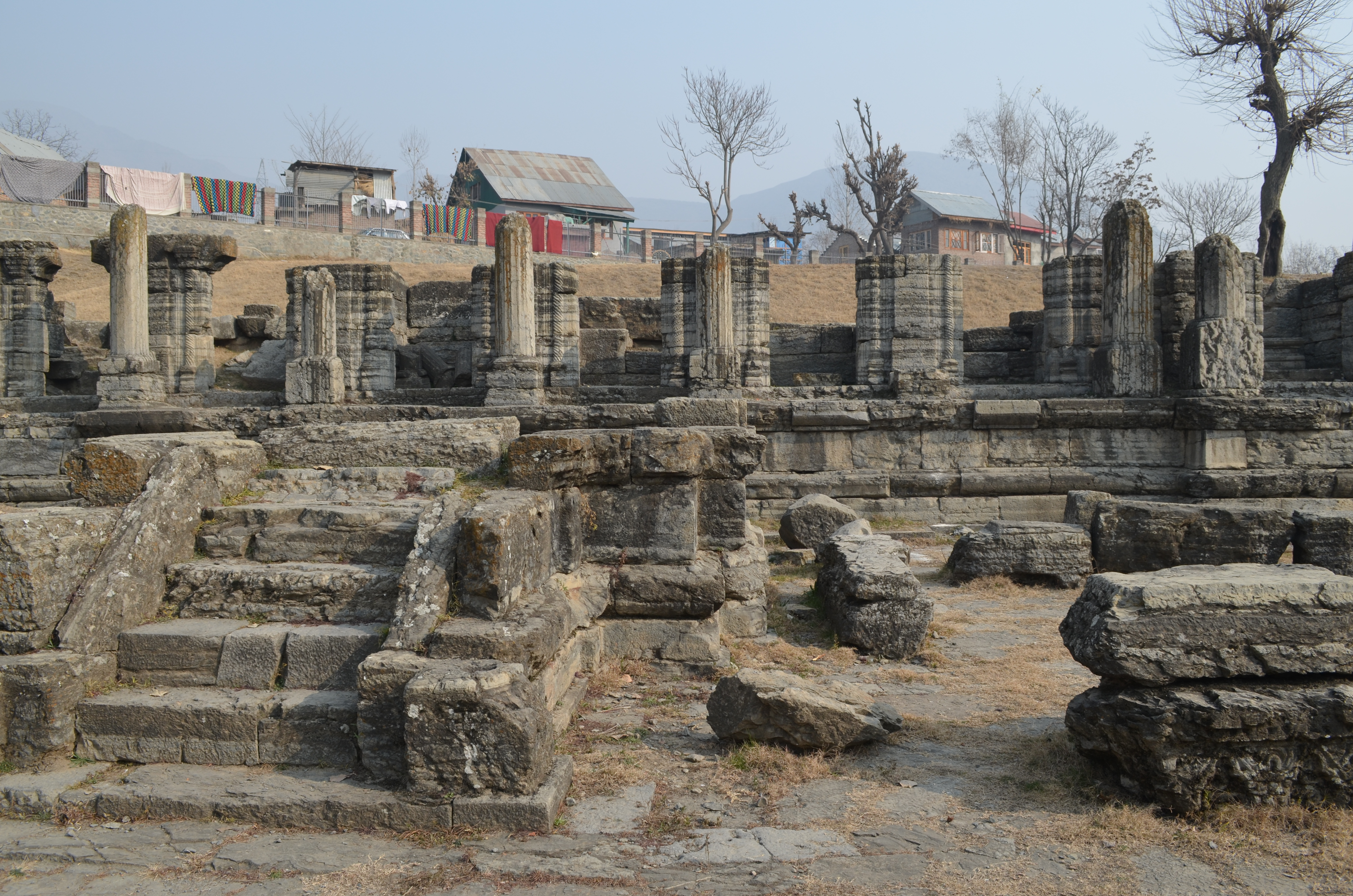
The Avantisvamin temple

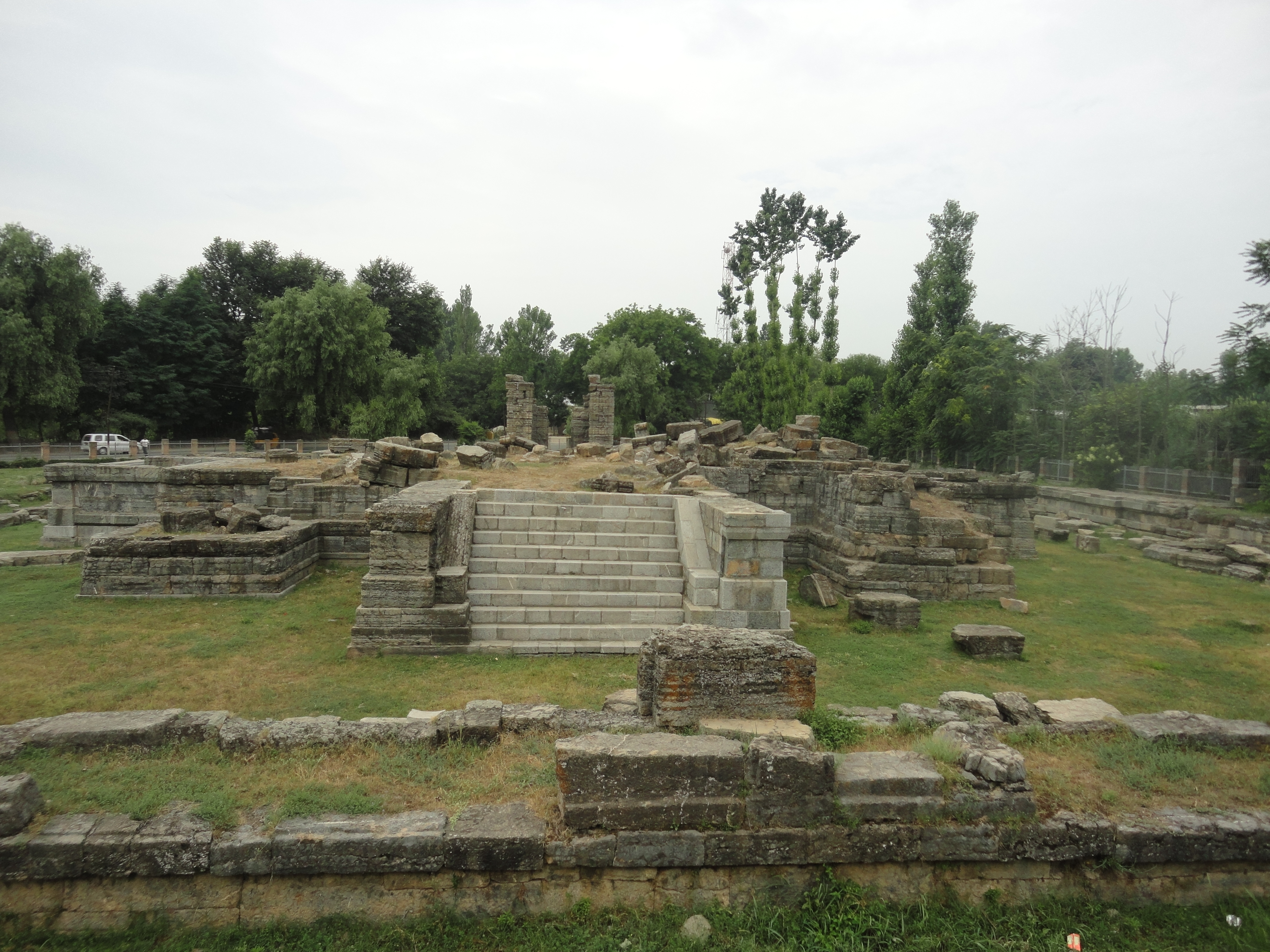
The Avantisvara temple

== Demographics ==
As per the 2011 census, Awantipora has an average literacy rate of 69.41%, lower than the national average of 74%. Male literacy was 80.17%, and female literacy was 43.03% 9% of the population is under 6 years of age. Awantipora has a population of 12,647 people.

Religion in Awantipora City (2011)
1. Islam (61.2%)
2. Hinduism (36.5%)
3. Sikhism (1.45%)
4. Christianity (0.69%)
5. Buddhism (0.05%)
6. Jainism (0.01%)
7. Not Stated (0.17%)

== Villages in awantipora tehsil ==
The villages along with their patwar halqa (revenue circle) in Awantipora tehsil are listed below.

| Village | Patwar Halqa |
|---|---|
| Awantipora (town) | Awantipora |
| Kanjinag | Awantipora |
| Rajpora Uller | Awantipora |
| Jawbrari | Barsoo |
| Barsoo | Barsoo |
| Padgampora | Padgampora |
| Aghanjipora | Padgampora |
| Larkipora | Padgampora |
| Goripora | Padgampora |
| Kanlibagh | Padgampora |
| Udiipora | Padgampora |
| Dangerpora | Padgampora |
| Malanghpora | Malanghpora |
| Rakhwatalpora | Malanghpora |
| Kariwa Rambirabad | Malanghpora |
| Awanpora | Malanghpora |
| Tokna | Tokna |
| Gulzarpora | Tokna |
| Beighpora | Tokna |
| Shalltokna | Tokna |
| Reshipora | Reshipora |
| Nowgamuller | Reshipora |
| Khandaypora | Reshipora |
| Renzipora | Reshipora |
| Chakhar | Reshipora |
| Kanipora Uller | Reshipora |
| Dogripora | Dogripora |
| Kawni | Dogripora |
| Noorpora | Noorpora |
| Chersoo | Chersoo |
| Sail | Chersoo |
| K.Koot | K.Koot |
| Mirzapora | K.Koot |
| Larmoh Awanpora | K.Koot |
| Poshwan | K.Koot |
| Hariparigam | Hariparigam |
| Pratabpora | Hariparigam |
| Midoora | Midoora |
| Khankah | Midoora |
| Gorikadal | Midoora |
| Shahabad (Kharpur) | Midoora |
| Panzgam | Panzgam |

=== IUST Awantipora ===
Awantipora is home to Islamic University of Science and Technology(IUST) dating back to 2005. The university has been set up as a centre for higher learning for the people of the Union territory of Jammu and Kashmir and its neighbouring regions.

=== AIIMS Awantipora ===
The All India Institute of Medical Sciences, Awantipora — also referred to as AIIMS Kashmir — is a public medical institution being established in Awantipora. The project was formally initiated on 7 November 2020, with an estimated cost of ₹1,828 crore,and the original completion target was set for 2 December 2025. The facility is designed to augment healthcare infrastructure in Kashmir by providing 750 beds. The campus will include a Medical College with a capacity of 100 students and a Nursing College accommodating 60 students.

As of 17 October 2026, the institute has achieved approximately 81% physical progress. On 31 July 2026, Lok Sabha was informed that AIIMS Awantipora will be completed by December 2026.

== See also ==
- Tral
- Anantnag
- Martand Sun Temple
- Sun Temple
