= Pampore =

Pampore Pampar, Panpar
- Town
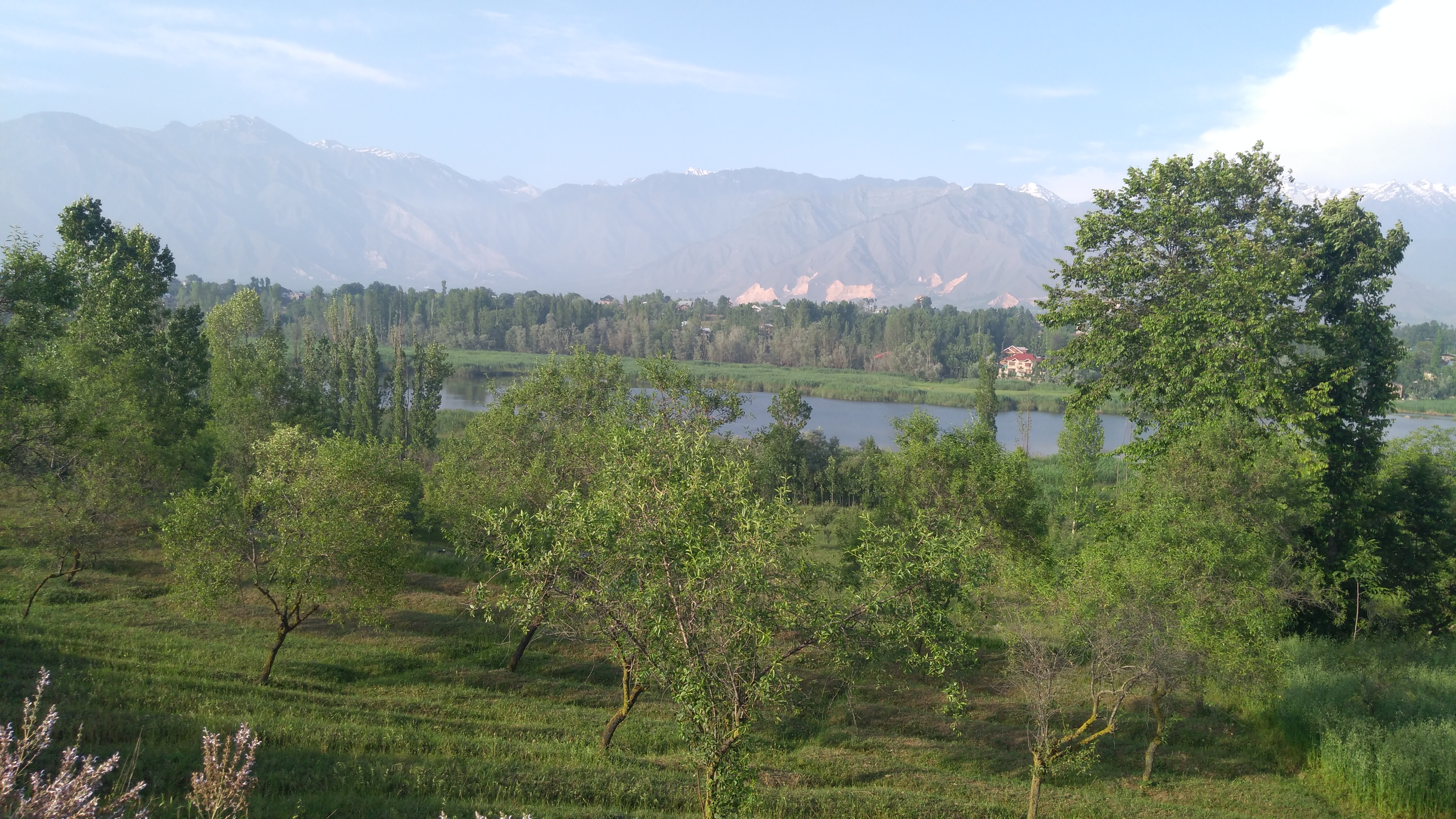
- View of Pampore Town in Pulwama district of the Kashmir Valley
- Nickname: Saffron City
- Location in Jammu and Kashmir, India Pampore (India)
- Coordinates: 34.02°N 74.93°E
- Country: India
- Union Territory: Jammu & Kashmir
- Division: Kashmir
- District: Pulwama
- Elevation: 1,573 m (5,161 ft)

Population
  - Total: 21,680
- Demonym(s): Pampori, Pamporiya, Pampari, Panpari, Panpariya

Languages
  - Official: Kashmiri, Urdu, Hindi, Dogri, English
- Time zone: UTC+5:30 (IST)
- Postal code: 192121

Pampore (Urdu pronunciation: [pɑ̃ːpoːr]), known as Pampar (Kashmiri pronunciation: [paːmpar]) or Panpar (Kashmiri pronunciation: [pãːpar]) in Kashmiri, is a historical town in the Indian union territory of Jammu and Kashmir. It is situated on the eastern side of the Jhelum River on the Jammu–Srinagar National Highway. It was known as Padmapur in antiquity. Pampore is about 11 kilometres away from Srinagar city centre Lal Chowk. It is world wide famous for its saffron, that why it also known as Saffron Town of Kashmir.

== Etymology ==
Pampore was originally called Padmapura.

== Geography ==
Pampore is located at 34.02°N 74.93°E.

== Prehistory ==
At the Galander site near Pampore, remains of the large extinct elephant Palaeoloxodon turkmenicus were found associated with stone tools produced by archaic humans, with the elephant bones suggested to display deliberate fracturing via stone tool hammering. The site is suggested to date to around 400,000-300,000 years ago.

== Economy ==
Pampore is known for its cultivation of saffron, with the broader region around Pampore being responsible for 90% of India's saffron crop, though production as of 2023 has declined due to higher temperatures and erratic rainfall.

== Demographics ==
Religion in Pampore (2011)
1. Islam (99.6%)
2. Christianity (0.18%)
3. Hinduism (0.12%)
4. Sikhism (0.04%)
5. Buddhism (0.00%)
6. Other (0.00%)
7. Not Stated (0.09%)

As of the 2011 Indian census, Pampore tehsil had a population of 60,613. Males constitute 52% of the population and females 48%. Pampore has an average literacy rate of 59%, lower than the national average of 59.5%: male literacy is 69%, and female literacy. As of 2011, Pampore town had a population of 21,680, males being 11,007 (51%) and females 10,673 (49%).

== Politics ==
Pampore is an Assembly Constituency in the Jammu and Kashmir Legislative Assembly, currently represented by Hasnain Masoodi.

== See also ==
- Pampore railway station
