= Islamic University of Science & Technology =

Indian university in Awantipora, Jammu and Kashmir

- Motto: Oh Lord! Advance Me In Knowledge
- Type: Government
- Established: 2005; 21 years ago
- Affiliations: UGC, AICTE, AIMA, AIU
- Chancellor: Lieutenant Governor of Jammu and Kashmir
- Vice-Chancellor: Shakil Ahmad Romshoo
- Students: 3300 - 3400
- Location: Awantipora, Jammu and Kashmir, India
- Campus: Campus spreads on 205.05 acres of land .; Rural plus Urban
- Website: www.iust.ac.in

Islamic University of Science & Technology (IUST) is a state university situated in Awantipora, in the Union Territory of Jammu and Kashmir, India. The university has been set up as a centre for higher learning for the people of the Jammu and Kashmir State and its neighbouring regions. It is recognised by the UGC and AICTE and is a member of AIU. It was established through an act passed by the Jammu and Kashmir State Legislative Assembly in November 2005. Islamic University is located 25 km from the summer capital of the state, Srinagar. The chancellor of the university currently is LG Manoj Sinha. The executive council, chaired by the Vice Chancellor, is the executive authority of the university. The strong science and technology curriculum is complemented by a School of Humanities and Social Sciences. The university focuses on career development and overall personality enhancement and tries to ensure education for leadership. Since the state of Jammu and Kashmir was turned into a Union territory after 5 August 2019, the Lieutenant Governor (LG) of the UT has assumed the role of chancellor of the university. The Jammu and Kashmir administration has recently transferred 1350 kanals of land near campus, where the university has planned to make solar park, biodiversity park and other infrastructure projects. In 2021 the university got the international standard athletic track. On January 1, 2025, IUST became the first state university in Kashmir to get a license from Ministry of Communication to establish a community radio station (FM 91.2 MHz) on its campus.

== Schools of study ==
The university offers undergraduate and postgraduate courses in the following schools of study

School of Technology
There are six undergraduate and three post graduate courses offered under this school.

School of Business Studies

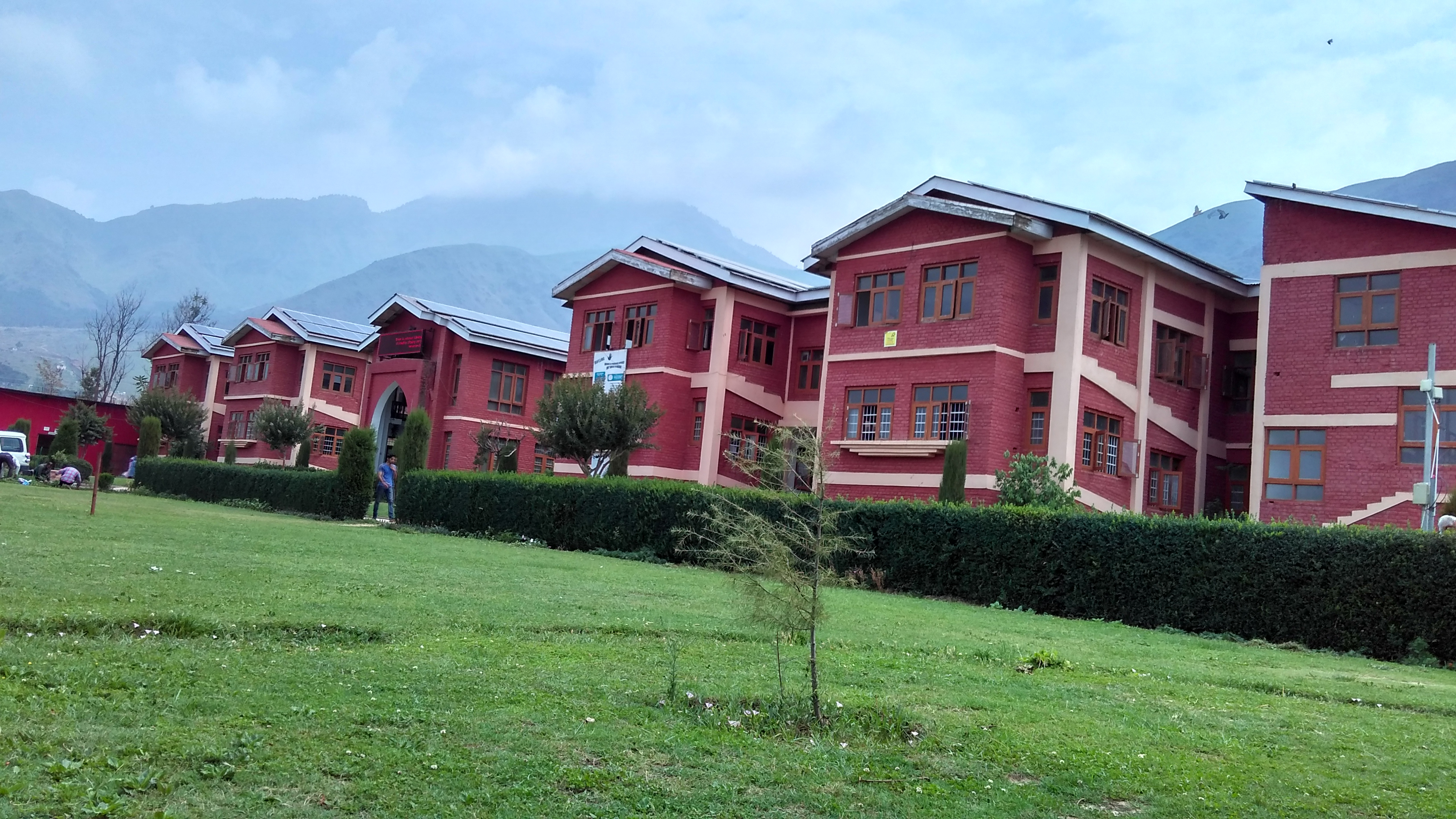
School of Business Studies, IUST.

There is one post graduate and one undergraduate programme. At the undergraduate level it is Bachelors in Business Administration (B.B.A.) and at the post graduation level Masters in Business Administration (M.B.A.).

- School of Humanities and Social Sciences: There are four departments offering four postgraduate courses under this school of study:

Department of Arabic Language and Literature offering MA Arabic Language and Literature

Department of Islamic Studies offering MA Islamic Studies

Department of English Language and Literature offering MA English Language and Literature.
The department of English Language & Literature admitted the first batch of postgraduate students in the year 2008.
The department now offers a Bachelor of Arts (Honors) program aligned with the New Education Policy (NEP 2020), extending the degree to four years under the FYUGP model. This flexible and multidisciplinary approach supports broader educational and professional development goals, especially in humanities, sciences, and management fields.

Department of Journalism offering Masters in Journalism & Mass Communication

Besides, the university has instituted three centres dedicated to social sciences. These centres are mandated to impart a core curriculum in humanities and offer degree programs and to promote advanced research.

Ibn-Khaldun Centre for Comparative Civilization

Centre for International Peace and Conflict Studies

Rinchen Shah Centre for West Himalayan Cultures

School of Sciences

The School of Sciences is the fourth, and the most recent, school of studies instituted at Islamic University. In keeping with the university's mandate for science and technology education, the school will facilitate the study of natural sciences and promote scientific research and innovation in all areas of natural sciences. The school houses the Department of Mathematics and Mantaqi Center for Science and Society. On the one hand, the school offers a mathematics program geared for today's competitive job market; on the other, it makes a distinctive contribution towards understanding scientific progress and its impact within a wider social, political and historical surrounding.

The school will, in the near future, incorporate degree programs in other natural science disciplines.

== Library ==
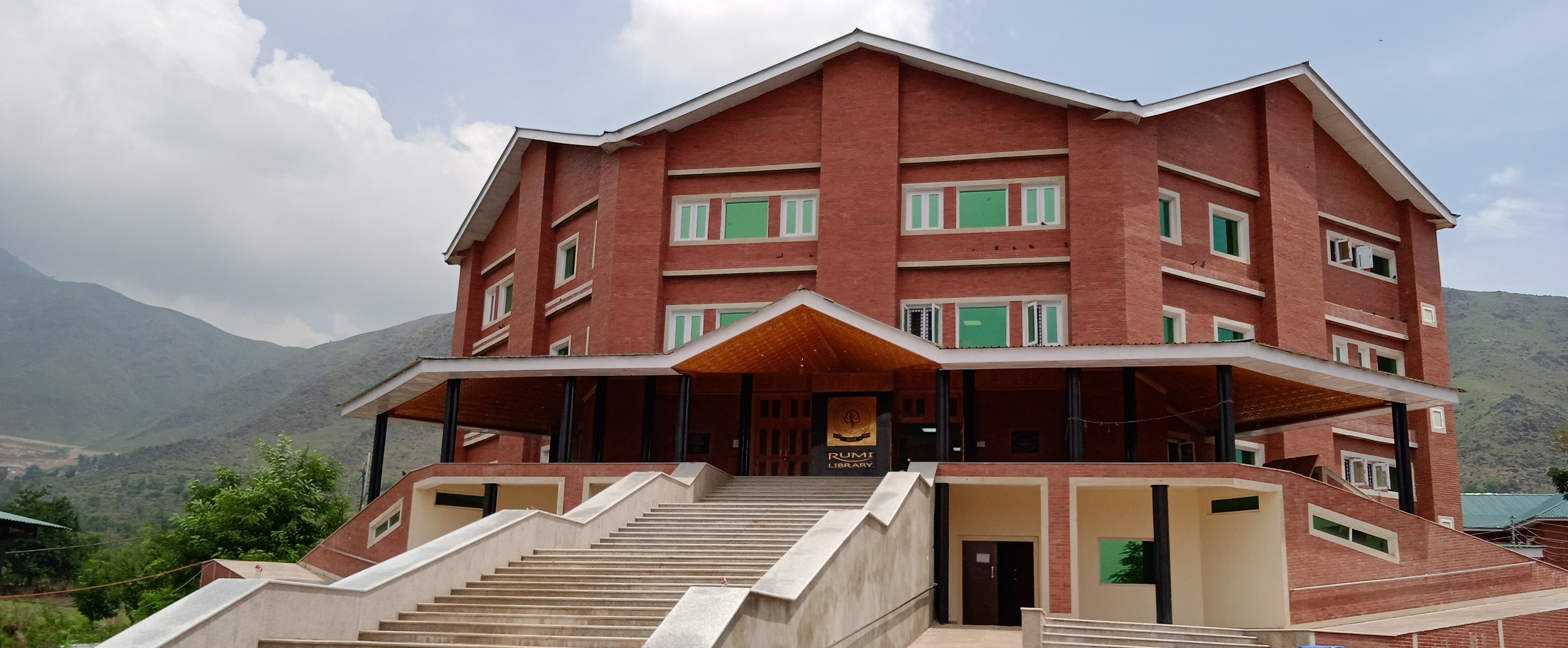
Rumi Library IUST

Central library of IUST incepted its operations in 2005 at the academic block of the university and subsequently in 2010 from Skill and Enhancement Training (SET) building. It is now housed in octagonal shaped structure. It has been named as “Rumi Library”. Ground floor of it is housing mini conference cum meeting hall, space for cafeteria and other sections. It has about 50,000 books. It subscribes to about 65 Print journals/magazines and has access to over 12000 journals. In addition, Rumi Library subscribes to 14 leading national as well as local newspapers. It has a “Book Bank” facility for needy and meritorious students. It maintains “Career Corner” with 638 books for resource seekers.
