= Kakapora =

Kakapora Kakepur
- Town
- Location in Jammu and Kashmir, India Kakapora (India)
- Coordinates: 33.94°N 74.92°E
- Country: India
- Union Territory: Jammu and Kashmir
- District: Pulwama

Population (2011)
  - Total: 6,518

Languages
  - Official: Kashmiri, Urdu, Hindi, Dogri, English
- Time zone: UTC+5:30 (IST)
- PIN: 192304

Kakapora or Kakepur is one of the tehsils in District Pulwama of the Union territory of Jammu and Kashmir. It is about 20 km (12 mi) from Srinagar, the summer capital of Jammu and Kashmir. It is about 1.5 km (0.93 mi) from NH44. Kakapora is famous for rice cultivation. It is also known as rice bowl of valley besides apple cultivation is also done in this area. Kakapora is situated on the left bank of river jehlum. Kakapora has very old history from pandwas to kalingas rule which is also mentioned in rajaterangi (one of the oldest history books of India). It is also famous for making pencil slades all over India, besides being a hub of various administration centers and Factories . .

== History ==
Kakapora has historical importance from ancient times of the Uttpal dynasty of King Awantiwarman. An archaeological monument, a temple from the 11th century AD, has been excavated near Asian Masjid in Astan Mohallah Kakapora. The temple has only a remaining sanctum with some ruins. Many standing remains including stone-carved images of a female character (whom locals call "Rani") and a bathtub have been found. The monument is protected by archaeological survey of India and beautification, fencing floor reconstruction has been done by the department.

In September 2014 floods, the temple oozed freshwater due to its being below a level that people of surrounding areas used for domestic and bath purposes. The temple was affected by waterlogging, and reconstruction work was again started in March 2016.

A temple is a place of refreshment for locals during summer, and especially after sunset, local youth rest in the landscape of the temple.

Kakapora was set up as an administrative unit as tehsil by the government of Jammu and Kashmir.
