= Pulwama =

City in Jammu and Kashmir, India

- City
- Pulwama
- Location within Jammu and Kashmir Location within India
- Coordinates: 33.8741°N 74.9001°E
- Country: India
- Union Territory: Jammu and Kashmir
- District: Pulwama district
- Established: 1979

Government
  - Type: Municipality
  - Body: Pulwama Municipal Council

Area
  - Total: 35.00 km^{2} (13.51 sq mi)
- Elevation: 1,652 m (5,419 ft)

Population (2011 Census of India)
  - Total: 18,440
  - Density: 526.9/km^{2} (1,365/sq mi)
- Demonym: Pulwaemuk or Pulwam(j)

Languages
  - Official: Kashmiri, Urdu, Hindi, Dogri, English
- Time zone: UTC+5:30 (IST)
- Postal code: 192301
- Telephone code: +91-1933
- Vehicle registration: JK13
- Sex ratio: 913 ♀/♂
- Literacy rate: 83.24%
- Website: pulwama.gov.in

Pulwama (Urdu pronunciation: [pʊlʋɑːmɑː] ; Kashmiri pronunciation: [pulʋoːm] or [pulɡoːm]) is a city and notified area council in the Pulwama district of Indian-administered Jammu and Kashmir in the disputed Kashmir region. It is located approximately 25 kilometres (16 mi) south of the summer capital of the state, Srinagar.

== History ==
Pulwama was known as Panwangam in antiquity, and later as Pulgam.

== Geography ==
With its coordinates 33.8830554°N, 74.9208705° E it is situated at an altitude of 1,500 to 2,000 meters above mean sea level.

=== Climate ===
Average rainfall in the city is 505.3mm annually, with the highest recorded Rain of 772.30 mm in 1998. Temperatures reach as high as 37 °C (99 °F) and as low as −12 °C (10 °F).

== Economy ==
With 70 per cent of its population in Agriculture sector, Pulwama has a growing industrial sector. It has some prominent industries in, cement production, wood products, and food processing.

== Educational institutions ==
- Govt Degree College, Pulwama
- Islamic University of Science and Technology Awantipora
- Govt Degree College (Women), Pulwama
- Govt. GNM Nursing College Pulwama

== Greater Pulwama master plan ==
On 12 February 2021, the government of Jammu and Kashmir approved the constitution of a board for scrutinizing and evaluating objections, representations and suggestions by stakeholders concerning a draft master plan for Greater Pulwama 2020–2040.

== Smart City ==
Numerous Projects for Smart City are underway. list of Projects 1. Smart Clock Tower 2. Led Displays 3. New Footpaths 4. Parking Lots 5. Parks (Children Parks) 6. Segregated House Waste 7. Central Verges 8. High Mast Lights. 9. New Tricolour LED's

== Demographics ==
Historical population
Year	Pop.	±% p.a.
1981	7,731	—
2001	14,229	+3.10%
2011	18,440	+2.63%

Religion in Pulwama City (2011)
1. Islam (94.6%)
2. Hinduism (4.63%)
3. Sikhism (0.34%)
4. Christianity (0.17%)
5. Buddhism (0.02%)
6. Jainism (0.01%)
7. Not Stated (0.24%)

Per the 2011 Census of India, the city of Pulwama had a population of 18,440 people, with 10,070 males and 8,370 females. Children aged 6 and under numbered 3,167—making up approximately 17.17% of the total population. The female sex ratio of the city is 831, lower than the Jammu and Kashmir state average of 889. Additionally, the child female sex ratio is around 718; also lower than the state average of 862. The literacy rate of Pulwama is 91.18%, significantly higher than the state average of 67.16%. The city is situated in the Kashmir Valley, and the majority of its inhabitants are ethnic Kashmiris.

=== Religion ===
The majority of Pulwama's inhabitants are Muslims, comprising 94.59% of the total population, while Hindus comprise the second-largest religious minority at 4.63% of the total population. Other religious minorities in the city include Sikhs (0.34%), Christians (0.17%), Buddhists (0.02%) and Jains (0.01%); 0.24% of the population abstained from declaring their beliefs.
