= Pulwama district =

Pulwama district Pulwom, Pulgom
- District of Jammu and Kashmir administered by India
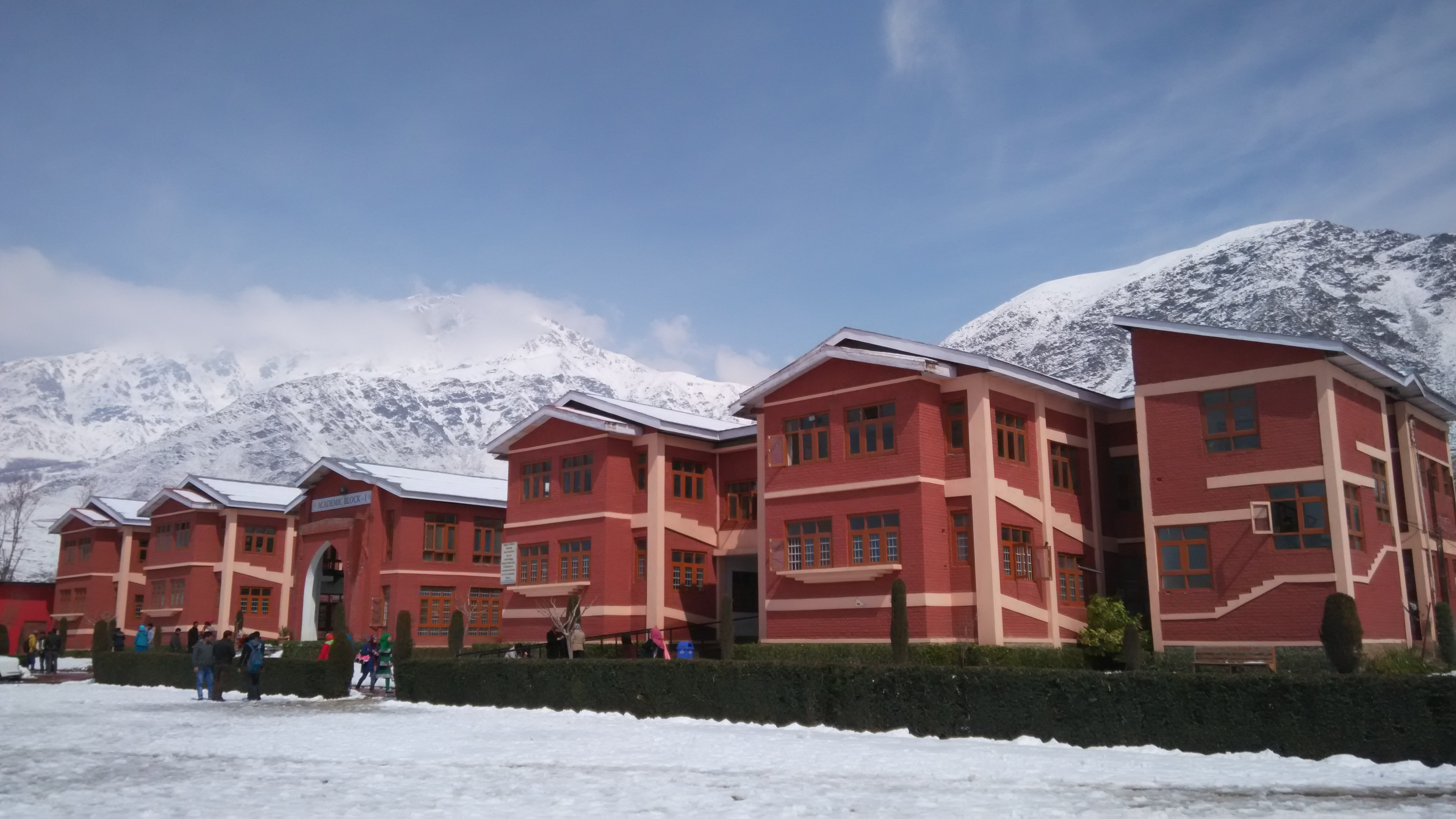
- The Islamic University of Science and Technology in Awantipora, 2015
- Interactive map of Pulwama district
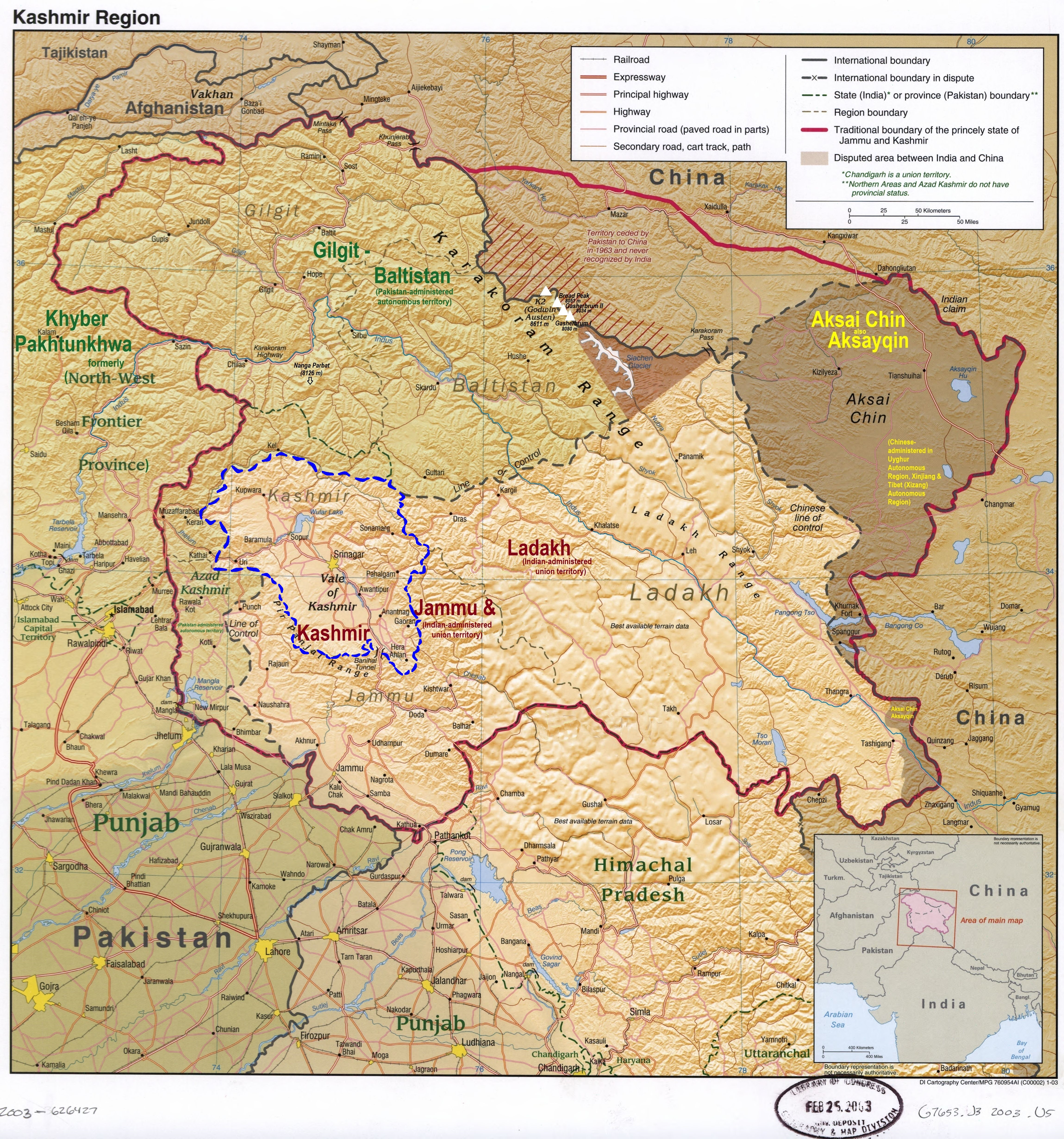
- Pulwama district is in Indian-administered Jammu and Kashmir in the disputed Kashmir region It is in the Kashmir division (bordered in neon blue).
- Coordinates (Pulwama): 33.87°N 74.90°E
- Administering country: India
- Union territory: Jammu and Kashmir
- Established: 1979
- Headquarters: Pulwama

Area
  - Total: 1,090 km^{2} (420 sq mi)
- Elevation: 1,630 m (5,350 ft)

Population (2021(estimated))
  - Total: 650,429
  - Density: 597/km^{2} (1,550/sq mi)
  - Literacy: 65.3%

Languages
  - Official: Kashmiri, Urdu, Hindi, Dogri, English
- Website: http://pulwama.gov.in

Pulwama district is an administrative district of Indian-administered Jammu and Kashmir in the disputed Kashmir region. It is located to the south of Srinagar. Its district headquarters are situated in the city of Pulwama. It is located in the central part of the Kashmir Valley.

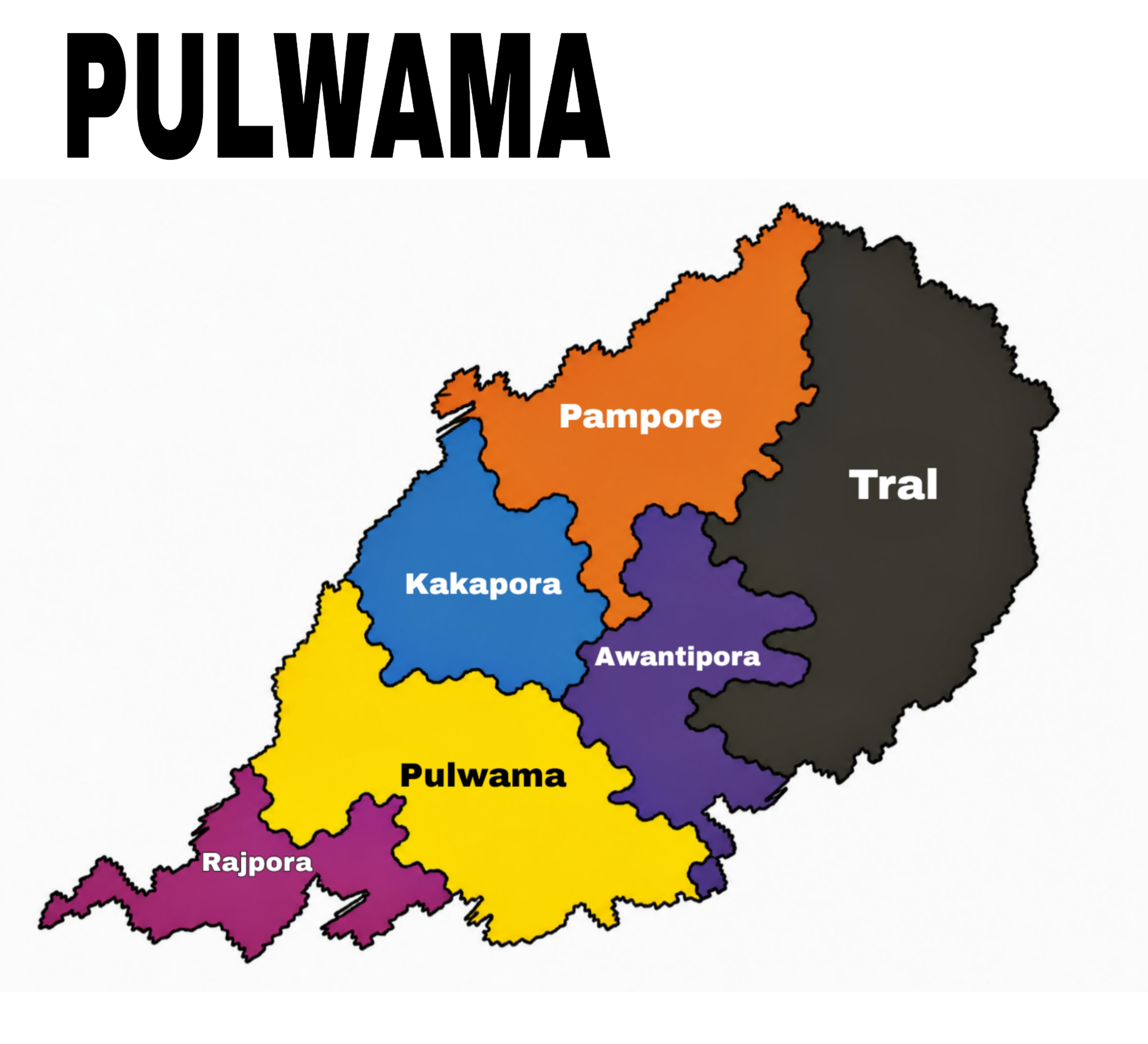
District map of Pulwama

== Administration ==
In 1979 Anantnag district split in two, with one part remaining as Anantnag district, and the other part becoming Pulwama district. When created, Pulwama district had 550 villages, grouped in five subdistricts (tehsils): Shopian, Awantipora, Pampore, Pulwama, and Tral. After Shopian district was created in 2007, Pulwama district had 331 villages and four subdistricts. According to the district administration, the area of the district is 420 square miles (1,090 km^{2}).

Pulwama district currently has eight subdistricts, with 327 villages (eight of which are uninhabited):

=== Tehsils ===
The Pulwama district contains eight tehsils:

- Awantipora Tehsil
- Pampore Tehsil
- Pulwama Tehsil
- Tral Tehsil
- Rajpora Tehsil
- Aripal Tehsil
- Shahoora (Litter) Tehsil
- KakaporaTehsil

This district consists of five development blocks: Tral, Keller, Pampore, Pulwama and Kakapora. Each block consists of a number of panchayats.

=== District Development Council ===
- Chairperson: Syed Abdul Bari Andrabi (JKPDP)
- Vice-chairperson: Mukhtar Ahmad Bandh (JKNC)

S.No	Party	Alliance	No. of Members
1.	INC	UPA	
2.	BJP	NDA	1
3.	JKNC	PAGD	2
4.	JKPDP	PAGD	8
5.	JKAP		
6.	JKPM		
7.	Independent		4
Totak			14

== Demographics ==
According to the 2011 census Pulwama district has a population of 560,440, roughly equal to the nation of Solomon Islands or the US state of Wyoming. This gives it a ranking of 537th in India (out of a total of 640). The district has a population density of 598 inhabitants per square kilometre (1,550/sq mi). Its population growth rate over the decade 2001–2011 was 29.18%. Pulwama has a sex ratio of 912 females for every 1000 males (though this varies with religion), and is lower than the national average of 940, and a literacy rate of 64.3%.14.36% of the population lives in urban areas. Scheduled Castes and Scheduled Tribes make up 0.07% and 4.03% of the population respectively.

Sex Ratio in Pulwama District in 2011 Census. (no. females per 1,000 males)
Religion (and population)	Sex Ratio
Muslim (pop 535,159)	952
Hindu (pop 13,840)	106
Sikh (pop 9,440)	847
Other (pop 2,001)	500
Total (pop 560,440)	912

Religion in Pulwama district (2011)
Religion	Percent
Islam	95.49%
Hinduism	2.47%
Sikhism	1.68%
Other or not stated	0.36%

Pulwama district: religion, gender ratio, and % urban of population, according to the 2011 Census.
	Hindu	Muslim	Christian	Sikh	Buddhist	Jain	Other	Not stated	Total
Total	13,840	535,159	1,109	9,440	35	6	18	833	560,440
Total	2.47%	95.49%	0.20%	1.68%	0.01%	0.00%	0.00%	0.15%	100.00%
Male	12,515	274,104	818	5,111	26	4	10	476	293,064
Female	1,325	261,055	291	4,329	9	2	8	357	267,376
Gender ratio (% female)	9.6%	48.8%	26.2%	45.9%	25.7%	33.3%	44.4%	42.9%	47.7%
Sex ratio (no. of females per 1,000 males)	106	952	356	847	–	–	–	750	912
Urban	7,388	72,353	223	364	12	3	4	115	80,462
Rural	6,452	462,806	886	9,076	23	3	14	718	479,978
% Urban	53.4%	13.5%	20.1%	3.9%	34.3%	50.0%	22.2%	13.8%	14.4%

Pulwama district: mother-tongue of population, according to the 2011 Census.
1. Kashmiri (91.3%)
2. Gojri (3.96%)
3. Punjabi (1.38%)
4. Hindi (1.25%)
5. Others (2.11%)

At the time of the 2011 census, 91.30% of the population spoke Kashmiri, 3.96% Gojri, 1.38% Punjabi and 1.25% Hindi as their first language.

== Healthcare ==
District has one of the best health care system in The State/Union Territory. District has 1 DNB Deemed District Hospital Pulwama, 3 Sub-District Hospitals and numerous other health institutions. One tertiary Healthcare institute is under construction in Awantipora Tehsil of the district. It will be the largest hospital in Kashmir province/division.

== Pencil District ==
The district is widely recognised as the leading producer of slates in the country. Approximately 70 per cent of the slate production in India originates from this district and is subsequently supplied to various pencil manufacturing companies. This distinctive characteristic has earned Pulwama the reputation of being the primary hub for slate production, making a significant contribution to the pencil industry. The village of Oukhoo in Pulwama district has been bestowed with the title of 'Pencil Village' by Prime Minister Narendra Modi in his "Mann ki Baat" address.

== Transport ==
District Pulwama is well connected with various transport modes.

National Highway 44 and National Highway 444 pass through Pulwama District.

There are 4 railways stations and 1 halt station located in the district. The district railway Headquarter is located at Awantipora Railway Station.

== Educational institutions ==
Some of the notable educational institutions of Pulwama district:

- AIIMS Awantipora
- Boys Government Degree College, Pulwama
- Islamic University, Awantipora
- Women's College, Pulwama
- Paramount Institute of Education
- Govt. GNM Nursing College, Pulwama
- Phoenix Paramedical College, Pulwama
- Dolphin Paramedical College, Pulwama

== Kashmir's First Synthetic hockey turf ==
Pulwama district in the southern Kashmir valley has achieved a significant milestone with the installation of the first synthetic hockey turf in the entire valley. This state-of-the-art stadium has been constructed to meet the growing demand for hockey facilities in the Kashmir division. The stadium has been constructed at Government Boys Higher Secondary School Pulwama, with an investment of Rs 5 crore, as part of the sports facilities enhancement plan by the government of Jammu and Kashmir. This initiative aims to improve the sporting infrastructure in the region and provide better opportunities for athletes to excel in their respective disciplines.

== Anand of Kashmir ==
The district stands out in milk production, and is the top milk producing district in Jammu and Kashmir, which has earned it the nickname "Anand of Kashmir". According to official data, Pulwama recorded milk production of 31 crore litres in 2020, which was distributed throughout Jammu and Kashmir. In the year 2017-18, Pulwama produced 28.04 crore litres of milk. On a daily basis, Pulwama currently produces 8.5 lakh litres of milk.

== Land use ==
The "reporting area" is the area for which data on land use classification are available. When Pulwama district was created in 1979 it had a "reporting area" of 380 square miles (980 km^{2}). After the creation of Shopian district in 2007, the "reporting area" of Pulwama district was reduced to 240 square miles (610 km^{2}).

Classification of use	Area in 2016–2017		% total area
Classification of use	sq miles	sq km	% total area
Forests	1.6	4	0.4%
Area under non-agricultural uses (roads, railways, buildings, rivers, canals)	32.4	84	8%
Barren and un-culturable land (mountains, deserts, etc.)	9.8	25	2%
Permanent pastures and other grazing lands	23.0	60	5%
Land under miscellaneous tree crops, etc.	4.3	11	1%
Culturable waste land (land that could be cultivated, that has not been cultivated in the last five years)	14.0	36	3%
Fallow lands other than current fallows (fallow for more than one year, which had been cultivated with the past five years)	0.7	2	0.2%
Current fallows (fallow this year, but cultivated the previous year)	24.6	64	6%
Net area sown (the total area sown with crops and orchards)	124.7	323	30%
Reporting area	234.6	608	56%
No data	186.1	482	44%
Total area	420.9	1,090	100%
Definitions of land use classifications are given at: "Nine-fold classification of Land Use", Ministry of Statistics and Programme Implementation, Government of India

== See also ==
- Anantnag district
- Kulgam district
- Shopian district
- Budgam district
