= Jasrota =

Jasrota kingdom from Jammu and Kashmir

Jasrota kingdom
- 1064–1815
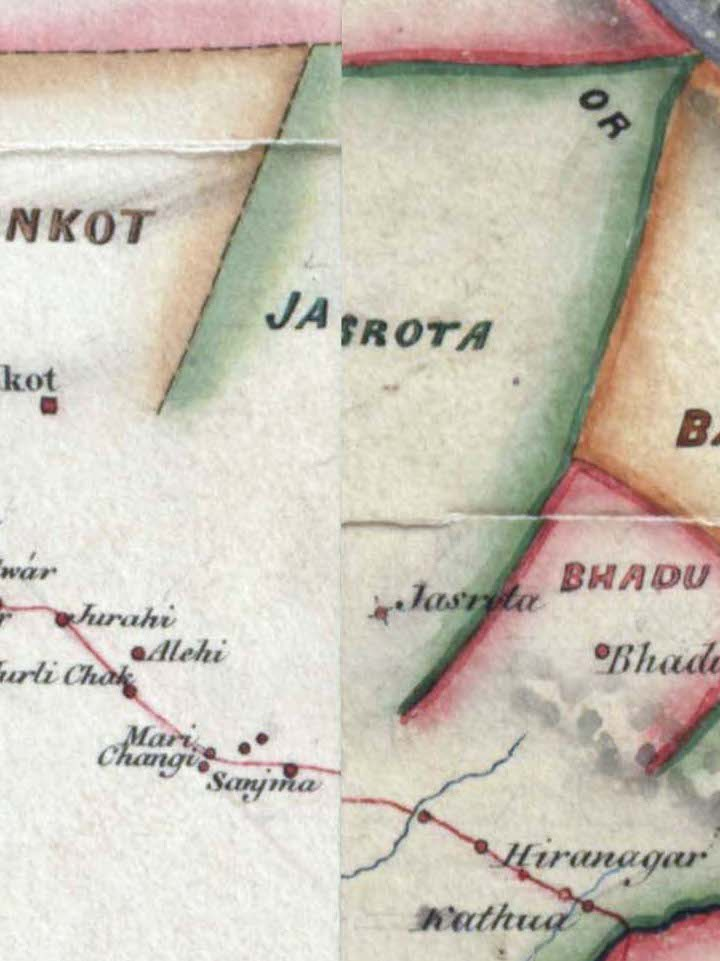
- Detail of Jasrota from a map of the various Hill States of the Jammu Hills region, copied in 1852. Parts of its borders has not been fully demarcated on the map.
- Capital: Jasrota (1064–1815); Lakhenpur (1350-1623)
- Common languages: Takri script Dogri; Kangri; Chambeali; Urdu
- Religion: Hinduism
- Government: Hereditary monarchy
- Raja
  - 1054–1098: Karan Dev (first)
  - 1805-1820: Randhir Singh (last)
- History
  - Established: 1064
  - Disestablished: 1815
Preceded by
| Dogra dynasty |
Succeeded by
| Sikh Empire |
| East India Company |
| Jammu and Kashmir (princely state) |

The Kingdom of Jasrota was a polity in the Himalayan foothills of India between 1064 AD and 1815 AD. It was situated at south-eastern Jammu between the Ravi and the Ujh rivers. The remainants of Jasrota exists as ruined forts, restored temples, water bodies and canals in Hiranagar tehsil, Narowal tehsil, Nagri tehsil, Kathua tehsil, Marheen tehsil, Dinga Amb tehsil, Ramkot tehsil, Mahanpur tehsil and Billawar tehsil. Jasrota had seven forts with seven ponds and seven gates.

== History ==
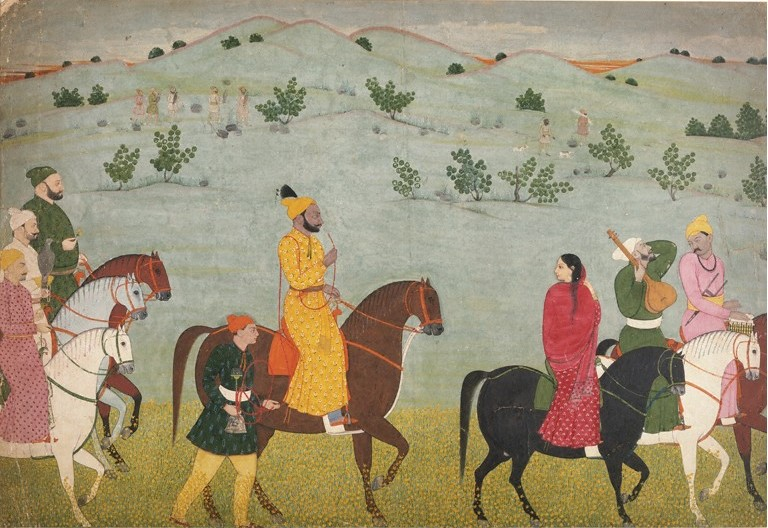
Mian Mukund Dev of Jasrota, ca (1720–1770)

Jasrota was one of ten states founded by members of the Jammu ruling family. They were all tributaries to the Raja of Jammu. It was probably the first of those to be established, although its origin is disputed. Jasrota is a upland township in Kathua district and it is just 16 km from Kathua city. Some sources say that Raja Jas Dev of Jammu (c. 1020–1053) give to his brother, Karan Dev. Others say that Karan Dev was a son of Bhujdev, a ruler of Jammu, and that the state came into existence in either the 12th or early 13th century, when Karan Dev's military prowess enabled him to win over the jagirdars and landlords of the area; in this latter interpretation, Karan Dev was Jas Dev's nephew. There is agreement that Karan Dev was the founder of the ruling Jasrotia family.

The first written record of Jasrota is probably that found in the Ma'asir-ul-Umara. The state was bifurcated following a dispute between the twin sons of Kailesh Dev, who had been ruling in 1320. Pratap Dev and Sangram Dev both sought to succeed their father but it was impossible to prove which brother was the older. Eventually, the rulers of neighbouring hill states negotiated a settlement, leading the lands being divided and Sangram becoming the first ruler of the new state of Lakhanpur in 1350 and his descendants were called lakhanpuria rajputs.

In 1594–94, the then ruler of Jasrota, Bhivu Dev, (Note: Bhivu Dev is also referred to as Bhabu.) used his army to ally in a rebellion involving some other hill states against the Mughal Emperor Akbar the Great. The revolt is referred to in the Ma'asir-ul-Umara and Akbarnama but the history of Jasrota in the following years, up until the arrival of Sikh forces in the region, is obscure. It appears to have taken little part in the various regional upheavals of the 17th and 18th centuries and the recorded genealogy of the ruling family is incomplete.

Ajab or Ajib Dev was ruler of Jasrota between 1790 and 1800. He arranged the construction of Jasmergarh Fort (near to the present-day town of Hiranagar, then on the border of his territories) in order better to protect Jasrota from Sikh incursions.

=== Sikh empire ===
The last member of the Dev dynasty to rule Jasrota independently was Randhir Singh, (Note: Randhir Singh is also spelled as Ranbir Singh, and Karan Dev as Karn Dev.) who reigned from 1805 to 1820 and had to acknowledge Ranjit Singh, the founder of the Sikh Empire, as his superior. Although Randhir Singh's brother, Bhuri Singh, was nominally recognised as his successor, Ranjit Singh annexed the territory in 1815 and both Nurpur kingdom and Jasrota were governed by Sikh Governor. In 1834 Jasrota was converted into a jagir that was gifted to Hira Singh, a son of Dhian Singh, the Dogra Prime Minister of Lahore, who was also a nephew of Gulab Singh.

It was Hira Singh who built the present fort at Jasrota, although its foundations date from around the 12th or 13th century and had been developed as a fortified town by Dev rulers thereafter with "palatial buildings, Baradaris, shrines, water tanks etc." Hira Singh was mostly an absent ruler but he aspired to develop Jasrota in the image of Jammu, with which it shared a similar topography. He went some way towards achieving this, and named many of its places and structures after those of Jammu, but the fort was razed by the Sikh Khalsa Army in 1845 and abandoned thereafter. The descendants of the Jasrotia family migrated to Khanpur, near to Nagrota.

=== Jammu and Kashmir ===
Following the First Anglo-Sikh War (1845–1846) and the Treaty of Amritsar (1846), Gulab Singh was proclaimed the Maharaja of Jammu and Kashmir, acquiring all the lands between the Ravi River and the Indus. Jasrota became part of his empire and got established as one of the five districts of the Jammu province. Between 1921 and 1931, the headquarters of the district was shifted to Kathua, and the district came to be called the Kathua district.

== Art ==
Hira Singh resurrected a connection with art for which Jasrota had previously had some renown. In building palaces of architectural splendour within the fort walls, he brought in painters to ornately decorate them. Jasrota had been particularly associated with the Dogra school of painting during the reigns of Bhupal Dev, Sukh Dev and Dhruv Dev, which began in the late 17th century and ended in 1735. Charak and Billawari say that "The great miniature tradition in the hills owes much to Jasrota", noting in particular the patronage of the family of the painter Nainsukh by Raja Balwant Singh and also the ongoing attendance at the royal court at Jammu, where Jasrota rulers sometimes served as diwans and would have been influence by its culture.

== Today ==
The palace of the Jasrotias still exists, although the fortified town is derelict and only an eponymous village exists on its outskirts. It is situated on the banks of the Ujh River, around 60 kilometres (37 mi) from Jammu, in Jammu and Kashmir. It now forms a part of the Jasrota Wildlife Sanctuary. Jasrotia Rajputs meet there annually to commemorate their history and organise a yajna for a temple that exists inside the palace. Two temples stood within the walls. One of these has now been decorated in the Lingam style and is dedicated to Shiva.

== See also ==
- Jasrotia
