= S. P. Vaid =

Indian Police Service officer

Shesh Paul Vaid
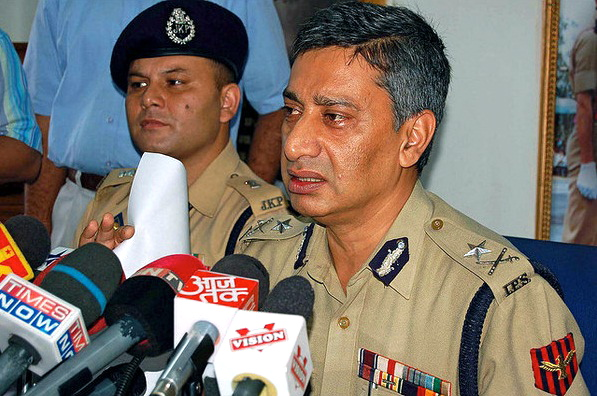
- S P Vaid addressing the media at Police control room in Jammu about the Joint Operation

Director General of Police of Jammu and Kashmir Police
- In office 31 December 2016 - 6 September 2018
- Preceded by: K. Rajendra Kumar
- Succeeded by: Dilbag Singh

Personal details
- Born: Shesh Paul Vaid; 30 October 1959 (age 66) Mahanpur, Jammu and Kashmir, India
- Spouse: Bharti Vaid (IIS)
- Children: 1
- Education: Madras Veterinary College; SVP National Police Academy
- Awards: President's Police Medal For Distinguished Service (PPMDS) – 2010 COAS Commendation Card – 2008 Police Medal For Meritorious Service (PMMS) – 2002 Sher-i-Kashmir Police Medal for Meritorious Service – 2002 Police Medal for Gallantry (PMG) – 2002 Internal Security Medal – 2001 Indian Wound Medal – 2001 Director General of Police Jammu & Kashmir Police Medal (DGPPM) – 1998

Military service
- Allegiance: India
- Years of service: 25 August 1986 – 31 October 2019
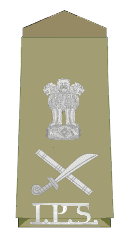
- Rank: Director General of Police (DGP) (till September 2018)

Shesh Paul Vaid, also known as S. P. Vaid, is an Indian police officer and former Director General of Police (DGP) of Jammu & Kashmir from 31 December 2016 till 6 September 2018.

== Personal life ==
Vaid was born and raised in the Mahanpur town of Kathua district in the Jammu Division of the erstwhile Indian state of Jammu and Kashmir in 1959 into a Dogra family. Vaid graduated in Veterinary Science (B.V.Sc) from Madras Veterinary College in the Vepery neighbourhood of Chennai, Tamil Nadu and then from the Sardar Vallabhbhai Patel National Police Academy in Hyderabad, Andhra Pradesh. He qualified for the Civil Services and was allotted the Indian Police Service (IPS) on 25 August 1986 with Jammu and Kashmir cadre.

Vaid is married to Bharti Vaid, an Indian Information Service officer. They have a daughter, Shivangi.

== Career ==
From 1988 to 1990, he was the Additional Superintendent of Police in Badgam and was promoted as Superintendent in the same district in 1990, the year when he faced maximum militant attacks. He also topped the International Commanders' programme at Police staff College at UK.

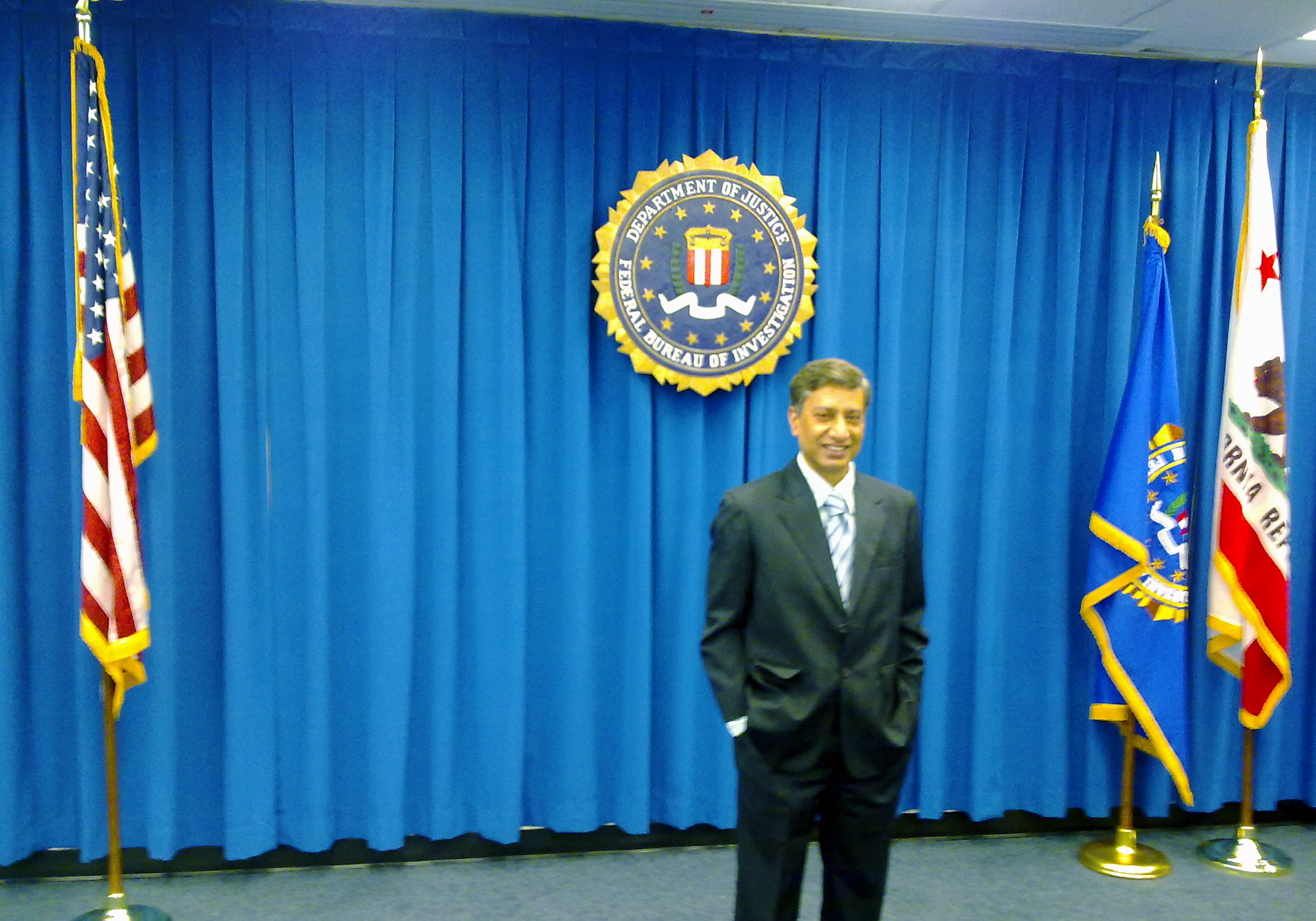
Mr. Vaid at Federal Bureau of Investigation (FBI) office in Los Angeles, USA during a seminar organised by Ministry of Home Affairs, Govt. of India.

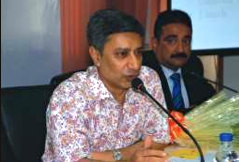
Vaid at the Governing Council Meeting of CAPSI

In the course of his career, he has served as Deputy Inspector General of Police of Jammu, as Inspector General (Crime), IGP (Home Guards and Civil Defence), as Inspector General Modernisation Police Headquarters, as Inspector General of Police of Jammu, as IGP Crime and Railways (2008) and Inspector General of Police (IGP) Traffic Jammu & Kashmir. In 2009, he was sent on deputation to Bureau of Police Research and Development (BPR&D) in New Delhi where he was initially posted as Director of Special Policing, then as Director of Training and in the last few months of his deputation as the Director of Administration.

In February 2010, Dr. S P Vaid was also appointed as the new Secretary of Central Indian Police Service Association (CIPSA) as an additional central charge besides his assignment in Bureau of Police Research & Development.

in June 2011, Dr Vaid was promoted to the senior Indian police rank of Additional Director General of Police. Consequently, he returned to his parent cadre in September 2011and in November 2011, the Jammu and Kashmir State Cabinet ordered the posting of Vaid as Additional Director General of Police (ADGP), Headquarters (PHQ).

On 3 March 2016, Vaid was promoted to the grade of Director General (DG), and was subsequently appointed as Director General of Police (Prisons). On 8 September 2016, Vaid was transferred and posted as Special DG (Coordination and Law & Order). The post of Special D.G Coordination held by S.K Mishra had been re-designated as Special DG (Coordination and Law & Order) till held by the officer.

On 28 December 2016, The State Cabinet confirmed the name of S.P. Vaid as new Director General of Police (DGP) of Jammu and Kashmir Police. The decision was taken in the State Cabinet meeting headed by Chief Minister Mehbooba Mufti in Jammu. On 31 December 2016, Vaid took over the charge of Director General of Police from K. Rajendra Kumar.

=== Notable contributions to law and order in Kashmir ===
Vaid has played a role in many notable events in the state and made attempts to facilitate the improvement of law and order and police-community relations.

- In December 1999 Vaid supervised the release from Kot Bhalwal jail of Pakistani mujaheddin leader and the founder of the militant group Jaish-e-Mohammed, Azhar Masood, who was exchanged for passengers on the hijacked Indian Airlines Flight 814 (IC-814).
- On 29 January 2002, there was a specific information that a group of Al-Badr militants were waiting for other terrorist associates to conduct a meeting to plan subversive activities in Srinagar. Vaid, then DIG of Police Range Srinagar planned a joint operation along with BSF and J&K Police SOG to apprehend the militants. The same night Vaid got the area cordoned off with the help of BSF/SOG and local police so as to ensure that militants do not escape during night taking the advantage of darkness. The held up militants tried to take the BSF personnel hostage who were trapped inside but an assault was launched by Vaid along with other officers and in the process managed to rescue one BSF Jawan. In an official statement from the President's Secretariat, the President of India awarded Vaid the President's Police Medal for gallantry:
  Dr. Vaid in a conspicuous act of gallantry led a group of SOG personnel into the house in the face of heavy firing and ensured lobbing of grenades into the rooms where the militants were taking shelter. In this encounter Shri Dr. S.P. Vaid IPS DIG, displayed conspicuous gallantry courage & devotion to duty of highest order.
  — President's Secretariat, "No.182-Pres/2002", President's Secretariat Notification (2002)
- In August 2006 the Indo-Asian News Service (IANS) reported about Vaid's involvement in a project with state-owned Bharat Petroleum to employ family members of the approximately 1,000 Jammu and Kashmir policemen who have died fighting separatists.
- In December 2006, as IGP Jammu, Vaid supervised the operation against the militants and regained control of the Kot Bhalwal prison following seven-hour clashes with more than 300 prisoners after the situation within the jail went out of control.
- Vaid served as a chairman of the session, "Regional Cooperation to Fight Terrorism", at the March 2009 Asia Pacific Regional Conference of The World Federation of United Nations Associations.
- In December 2011, Vaid inaugurated 2nd Police Martyr's Memorial North Zone Inter Club T-20 Cricket Championship 2011–12 in Kathua district of Jammu and Kashmir. This tournament is said to have served the dual purpose of better Police-Public relations and honour to Martyr's families.
- In the Burhan aftermath of the killing of Hizbul Mujahideen Commander, Burhan Wani in 2016, law and order situation in the Valley had spiralled out of control and the state government, while taking a serious note of it, shifted Vaid from the position of DG (prisons) and to Special DG (Law and order). After taking over the charge, Vaid camped in the Kashmir region and initiated various measures to make optimum use of the force so as to check rising casualties of both civilians and security forces through police-public interaction programmes in almost all districts of the Valley. Vaid has been credited for playing an important role in restoring peace and normalcy in the valley.

=== Assassination attempts ===
While Deputy Inspector General of Police, Baramulla range in the Kashmir Valley, Vaid suffered a severe hand injury in March 1999 when 25 militants ambushed his car and two escort gypsies on the national highway, on his way to Baramulla after a review meeting at Srinagar where he was officiating as Inspector General. The militants, aware that his car was bullet-proof, hurled hand-grenades and used powerful universal machine guns which pierce through bullet-proof glass, instead of the commonly used AK-47s.

In 1990, while Superintendent in Badgam, Vaid was accompanying his wife along with their month-old daughter from Gulmarg to Badgam. Militants attacked the convoy killing two army men in the vehicle in front of his car. The apprehended militants later admitted that the attack was meant to assassinate him.

== Positions held ==
Police appointments	Tenure
Director General of Police (DGP) – Jammu & Kashmir Police (JKP)	2016 – 6 September 2018
Special Director General of Police (DGP) – (Coordination and Law & Order)	2016 – 2016
Director General of Police (DGP) – Prisons	2016 – 2016
Additional Director General of Police (ADGP) – Headquarters	2011 – 2016
Secretary of Central Indian Police Service Association (CIPSA)	2010 – 2011
Director – Administration & Training of Bureau of Police Research & Development (New Delhi)	2009 – 2011
Inspector General of Police (IGP) – Traffic of Jammu & Kashmir	2008 – 2009
Inspector General of Police (IGP) – Crime & Railways of Jammu & Kashmir	2008 – 2008
Inspector General of Police (IGP) of Jammu (Range)	2004 – 2008
Inspector General of Police (IGP) – Modernization of Jammu & Kashmir	2003 – 2004
Deputy Inspector General of Police (DIG) – Administration in J&K Police Headquarters	2003 – 2003
Deputy Inspector General of Police (DIG) – Crime & Railways of Jammu & Kashmir	2002 – 2003
Deputy Inspector General of Police (DIG) of Kashmir (Range)	2001 – 2002
Deputy Inspector General of Police (DIG) of Jammu (Range)	1999 – 2001
Deputy Inspector General of Police (DIG) of Baramulla and Kupwara (Range)	1997 – 1999
Senior Superintendent of Police (SSP) – Crime & Railways of Jammu (Range)	1996 – 1997
Assistant Inspector General of Police (AIG) – Personnel in J&K Police Headquarters	1995 – 1996
Senior Superintendent of Police (SSP) of Udhampur (Range)	1993 – 1995
Assistant Inspector General of Police (AIG) – T&I in J&K Police Headquarters	1993 – 1993
Superintendent of Police (SP) of Leh (Range)	1993 – 1993
Superintendent of Police (SP) – City of Jammu	1991 – 1993
Superintendent of Police (SP) of J&K CID Cell (New Delhi)	1991 – 1991
Superintendent of Police (SP) of Badgam	1990 – 1991
Additional Superintendent of Police (ASP) of J&K Police Headquarters (Budgam)	1988 – 1990

== See also ==
- Burhan aftermath
- Bureau of Police Research and Development
- Indian Airlines Flight 814
- Insurgency in Jammu and Kashmir
- Indian Police
- Jammu & Kashmir Police
- List of people from Jammu and Kashmir
