= Lohai Malhar =

- Tehsil
- Location in Jammu and Kashmir, India Lohai Malhar (India)
- Coordinates: 32.69°N 75.66°E
- Country: India
- Union Territory: Jammu and Kashmir
- District: Kathua
- Elevation: 1,200 m (3,900 ft)

Population (2014)
  - Total: 1

Languages
  - Official: Dogri Hindi
- Time zone: UTC+5:30 (IST)
- Postal code: 184204

Lohai Malhar is a small village and tehsil of Kathua district in the union territory of Jammu and Kashmir, India. It is located about 105 km north by katli -Billawar road and about 150 km by Badnota - Machhedi road of the district headquarters at Kathua.

== Geography ==
Lohai Malhar has an average elevation of 1200 metres in the Sivalik Hills range of Himalaya. It has an area of 364.35 square kilometres and a population of 47,973.

Towards west Lohai Malhar shares a boundary with Dansal Tehsil of Udhampur district, towards east with Ghordi Tehsil and Ramnagar Tehsil towards the east.

== 1982 Plane Crash ==
An Indian Air Force Fairchild C-119 Flying Boxcar crashed near Lohai Malhar on February 8, 1982 due to heavy snowfall and rain, killing all 23 occupants on board. The aircraft had departed from Pathankot and was en route to Leh carrying supplies for troops stationed in forward areas and servicemen returning from leave. A local police patrol that witnessed the crash informed the Kathua police. Rescue teams recovered 15 mutilated bodies from the crash site on the first day, but the search for additional bodies was suspended due to darkness and severe weather conditions. A total of 23 personnel were killed in the accident.

== See also ==
- Basohli
- Hiranagar
- Nagri Parole
