= Mahanpur =

Mahanpur Pakhru Ge da Graan
- Town
- Location in Jammu and Kashmir, India Mahanpur (India)
- Coordinates: 32.54°N 75.64°E
- Country: India
- Union Territory: Jammu and Kashmir
- District: Kathua
- Elevation: 919 m (3,015 ft)

Population (2011)
  - Total: 1,554

Languages
  - Official: Dogri, Hindi
- Time zone: UTC+5:30 (IST)
- Postal code: 184202
- Vehicle registration: JK-08

Mahanpur is a small town and a newly created tehsil in Kathua district of Jammu Division in the union territory of Jammu and Kashmir, India. Earlier, Mahanpur was a town in Basohli tehsil. Mahanpur town is located about 50 km to the north of district headquarter Kathua and about 32 km south of the Sub Divisional headquarter Basohli.

== Geography ==
Mahanpur is located at 32.54°N 75.64°E, It has an average elevation of 396 metres in the lower Sivalik Hills range of Himalaya. Mahanpur (town) 919 has an area of 363 square kilometres. Mahanpur borders Bani and Duggan Tehsil to the north, Billawar to the west and Dharkalan to the south.

== Places to visit ==
- Ranjit Sagar Dam also called "Thein Dam"
- Sukrala Mata Temple
- Bala Sundri Mata Temple
- Dhole -joode Mata

== Nearby places ==
- Dalhousie, Kathua, Chamba, Bagholu.

== See also ==
- Basholi
- Hiranagar
- Nagri Parole
- Bani
