= Dudwara =

Dudwara Dadwara
- Village
- Dudwara

- Location in Jammu and Kashmir, India Dudwara (India)
- Coordinates: 32.56°N 75.53°E
- Country: India
- Union Territory: Jammu and Kashmir
- District: Kathua
- Tehsil: Billawar

Languages
  - Spoken: Dogri, English, Hindi
- Time zone: UTC+5:30 (IST)
- Pin Code: 184203

Dudwara is a primarily farming community in the Billawar tehsil of Kathua district in the Indian union territory of Jammu and Kashmir. Dudwara is known for its agriculture, Netaji Park and famous dangal in which wrestlers from all over the Northern India came to participate. Dudwara is one of the biggest village in the Tehsil in terms of area. Dudwara is south of the village of Bhaddu commonly known as Lower Bhaddu and located uphill from the Bhini bridge on the river Bhini.

Dudwara also has a small handicraft industry that is finding it a little difficult to survive in modern times. The community includes members from both the Hindu and Muslim communities.
