= Jasrotia =

Historical Rajput clan of Jammu, India

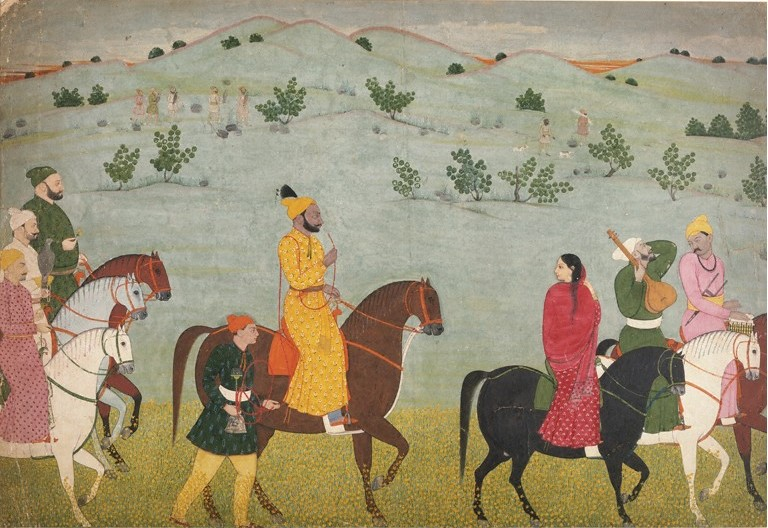
Raja Mian Mukund Dev of Jasrota, c. 1720–1770

Jasrotia / Jasoria is a Rajput warrior clan from the Jammu region of northern India, of Suryavanshi lineage, following Hinduism. They are Hindu Rajput warriors of Jammu region.

Jasrotia or Jasoria surname is derived from Jasrota in Hiranagar tehsil which was capital of Jasrota kingdom till 1815 where they once ruled. Their members inhabit in the Indian states of Himachal Pradesh, Jammu and Kashmir and Punjab. Defence services have remained their first choice of profession and are largely found working in the Indian Army, Indian Navy and Indian Airforce.

The major group of Jasrotia Rajputs are found in kandi of kathua in the Kathua district.

From Jasrotia a new clan of rajputs named Lakhanpuria originated due to partition of Jasrota between Partap Dev and Sangram Dev, the twin sons of the ruler of Jasrota Kailash Dev in 1350. With river Ujh forming the border between them.

Sangram Dev settled at Lakhanpur hence his descendants were called Lakhanpuria.

== Gallantry Award Recipients ==
=== Ashok Chakra ===
Captain Arun Singh Jasrotia, AC, SM was born on 16 August 1968 martyrdom 15 September was son of Lt. Col. Prabhat Singh Jasrotia and Smt. Satya Devi and born at Sujanpur in Pathankot district of Punjab. In Lolab Valley, Kashmir Captain Arun Singh Jasrotia was leading a patrol party when suddenly they were attacked. Immediately with his commando knife and grenades he neutralized four terrorists but succumbed to gun wound injuries in the skirmishes. He was posthumously awarded Ashoka Chakra and Sena Medal.

=== Sena Medal ===
Major Ajay Singh Jasrotia SM was born on 31 March 1972 martyrdom 15 June 1999 was son of IG BSF Arjun Singh Jasrotia and Smt. Veena and born at Gandhi Nagar in Jammu city. In Op Vijay, Kargil Maj. Ajay commanded 13 JAK who were tasked to capture Tololing. While on his way they were caught off hand by enemy shelling. He decided evacuation of injured amidst shelling and personally saved the lives of six injured soldiers who later survived but he couldn't due to a fatal shell hit wound while rescuing. He was given the gallantry award, “Sena Medal” posthumously for his valour, devotion to duty, fighting spirit and supreme sacrifice.
