= Tharial =

- village
- Location in Punjab, India Tharial (India)
- Coordinates: 32°21′17″N 75°36′24″E
- Country: India
- State: Punjab
- District: Gurdaspur

Population
  - Total: 10,000

Languages
  - Official: Punjabi
- Time zone: UTC+5:30 (IST)
- PIN: 145024
- Telephone code: 01870
- Vehicle registration: PB-
- Coastline: 0 kilometres (0 mi)
- Nearest city: Pathankot
- Literacy: 80%%
- Lok Sabha constituency: Gurdaspur

Tharial is a village in the Indian state of Punjab. It falls within the Pathankot district. It lies on the Pathankot- Jammu road. The nearest railway station to Tharial is Madhopur and main station is Pathankot railway station at a distance of 8.5 km. Tharial Chowk is a name of a chowk near Madhopur in Pathankot, Punjab, India. The population of this village is around 10,000.

Tharial is a village situated near Madhopur i.e., the last village of Punjab also called shaheeda Da Pind (शहीदों के गांव) (a village of martyrs) because many people from this village serve in the Indian Army, some of them are martyrs. Recently, the Indian government has made Gates in Memory of martyrs of this village like martyrs Balkar Singh Lalotra (Kargi war), Shamsher Singh and Parmod Dhiman, and others who served the country. The village has a post office, banks, ATM facilities, and resorts (Coral and Jal Mahal).

This was a Muslim-majority village pre-independence and there still remains from that era.

There is center point of this village. Tharial Chowk is a link between village Mutfarka, Village Tharial, Village Jaini Upparali and Village Jaini Nichli, Village Baroi, Village Ranipur, village Gurra Khurd, village Jandraii, etc. Tharial is surrounded by fields. The climate is very rich due to Himalayan hills. Local people are mostly involved in farming. There are several educational institutes in Pathankot, at a distance of 19.6 km. These include Sai institute badhani, and Aman bhalla institute.

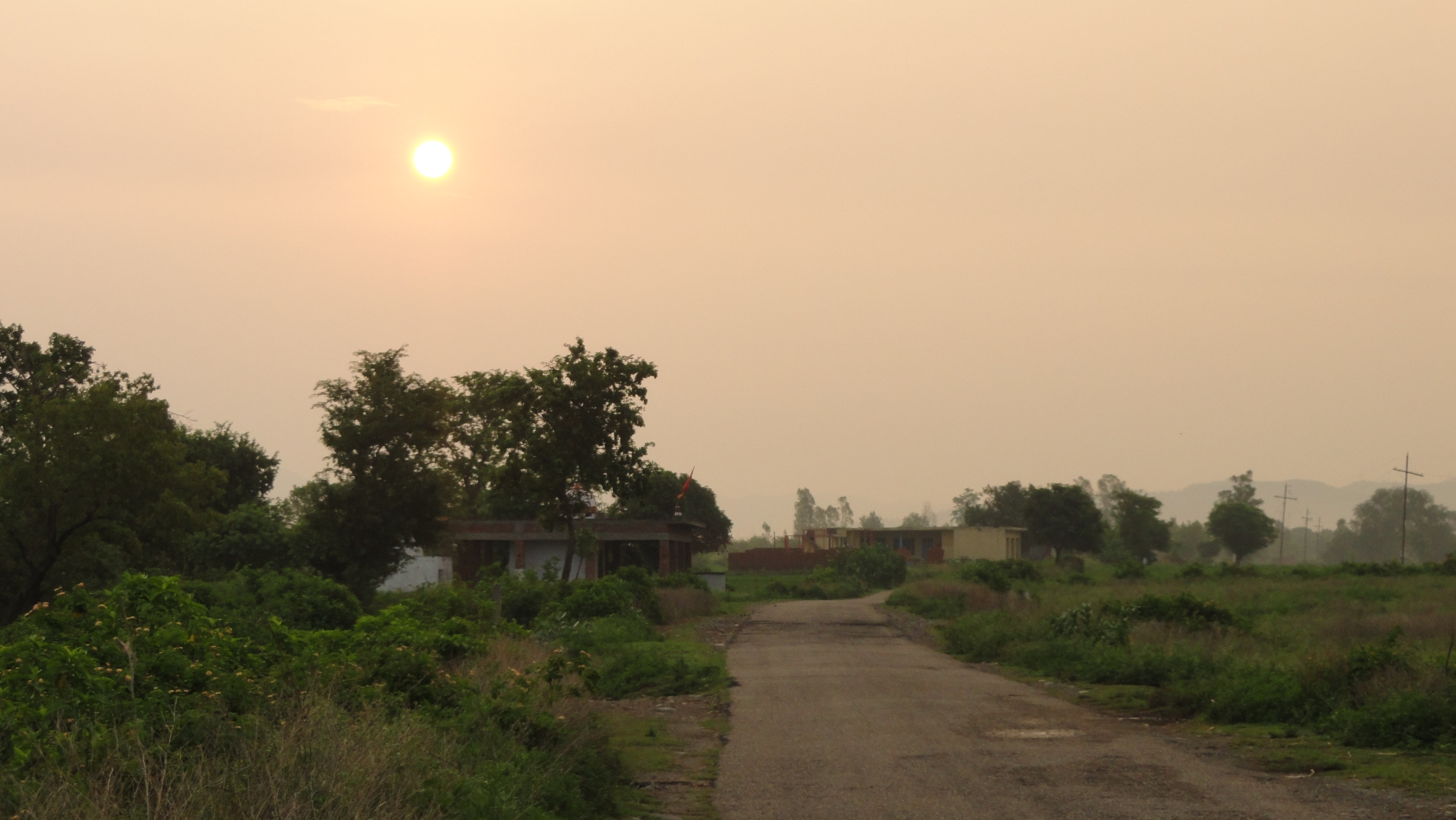
A morning view near Tharial village

== Locality ==
- Distances: Pathankot (19.6 km) Jammu (103.4 km) Amritsar (136.5 km) Kulu (206.1 km)
- Places close to Tharial: Pathankot, Sujanpur, Kathua, Jammu, Amritsar, Jalandhar, Nurpur, Dalhousie, Mukerian, Talwara, Chamba, Dasua, Qadian, Sangli, Dharmshala, Kangra
- The nearest Police Station is in Shapur Kandi (Jugial) (Police helpline number: 100)
- Coordinates are approximately: 32.355422, 75.611944
