= Ujh River =

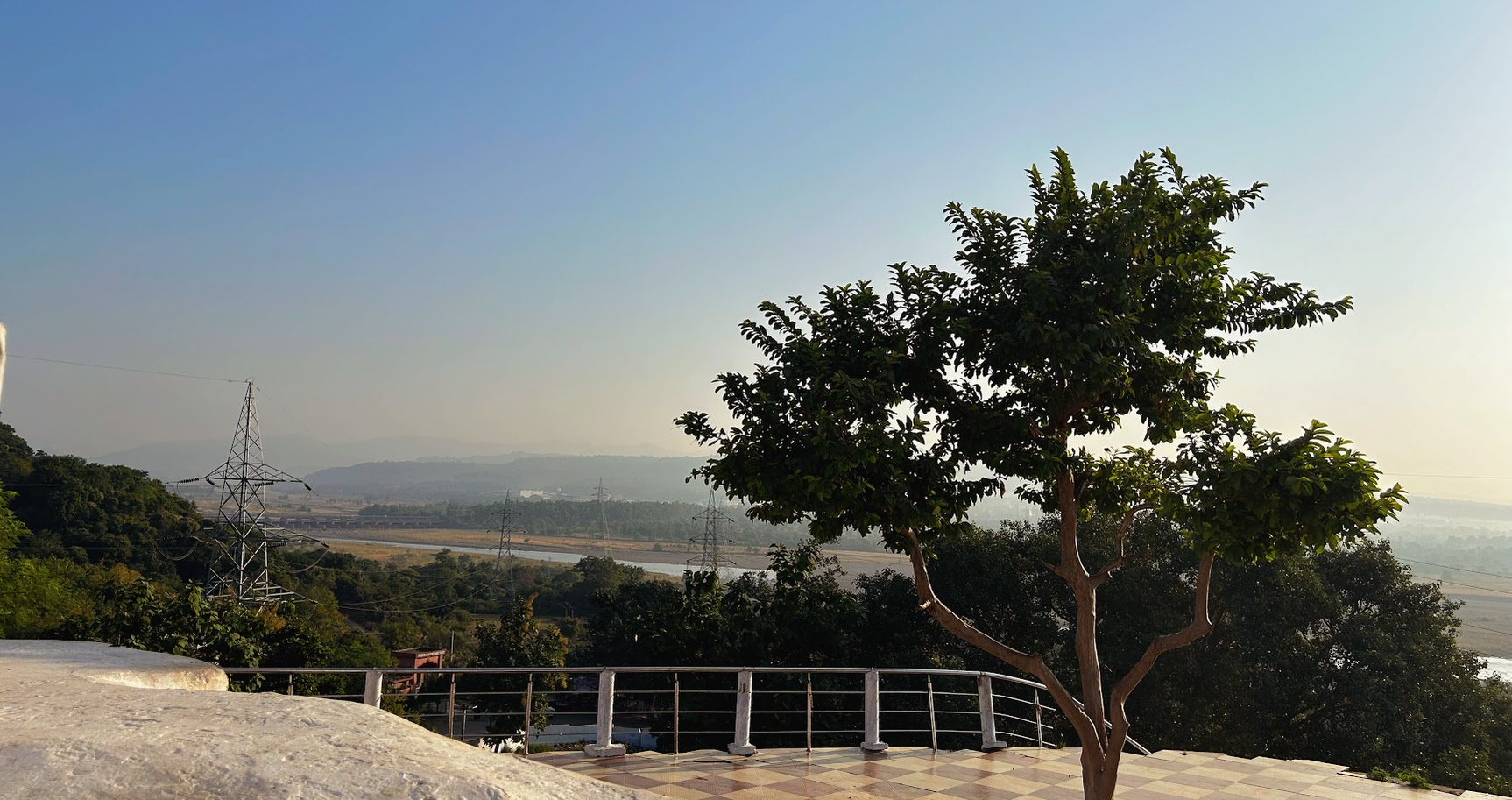
- Ujh Barrage as seen from Jasrota, Kathua

Location
- Country: India
- Regions: Jammu and Kashmir

Physical characteristics
- Source
  - location: Kailash mountains (near Bhaderwah hills, part of Pir Panjal range)
- Mouth: Ravi River
- Length: 65 km
- Width
  - average: 1.2 km

The Ujh is a river that flows through the Kathua district in the Jammu and Kashmir before entering Pakistan. It is a major tributary of Ravi River.

== Course ==
The Ujh river originates in Kailash mountains (near Bhaderwah hills, part of Pir Panjal range) at an altitude of 4,300 metres (14,100 ft). The average width of the river in the plains is about 1.2 kilometres (0.75 mi).

Four streams, Bhini, Sutar, Dunarki and Talan join Ujh at Panjtirthi. Ujh and Bhini are perennial rivers. The rest are seasonal.

At Karandi Khurd (32.4106°N 75.3991°E), the Ujh river spins off a 'western branch', which joins back with the main branch near Gharotta in Pakistani Punjab (32.2774°N 75.3430°E). Even though it is but a small stream, the western branch achieved notability as Cyril Radcliffe defined the India–Pakistan border to follow the course of this branch until reaching the trijunction of the Shakargarh, Pathankot and Gurdaspur tehsils. From the trijunction, the border was to follow the tehsil boundaries.

== Water utilisation ==
The water of Ujh River is used for drinking, irrigation and to feed a number of small canals and khuls of the district. It is also used to transport timber from hills to the plains and provides construction materials such as sand and stones.

== Dams ==
Ujh Barrage has been constructed on this river at Jasrota village (32.4728°N 75.4174°E).

A new Ujh Hydroelectrical Power Project dam, 196 MW, at (32.5633°N 75.4878°E) will store 925 million cubic metres of water. Under-construction stalled project expedited in April 2025 after the termination of IWT.

== See also ==
- Dams on Ravi River
