= Sarthal =

Region in Jammu and Kashmir

- Region
- Location in Jammu and Kashmir, India
- Coordinates: 33.231768°N 75.820194°E
- Country: India
- Union Territory: Jammu and Kashmir
- District: Kathua

Languages
  - Official: Urdu, English
  - Spoken: Kashmiri, Gojri, Kishtwari
- Time zone: UTC+5:30 (IST)
- PIN: 182204
- Distance from Kishtwar town: 25 kilometres (16 mi)
- Distance from Jammu: 250 kilometres (160 mi)
- Website: kishtwar.nic.in

Sarthal is a region in Kishtwar District of Jammu and Kashmir (union territory), famous for Sarthal Devi Temple.

== Sarthal Devi Temple ==
A Hindu shrine, Sarthal Mata is famous for annual pilgrimage known as Sarthal Yatra. The idol which is considered as re-incarnation of Goddess Durga, was originally carved from stones by locals during the period of Raja Agar Dev of Kishtwar and later, renovated by Maharaja Hari Singh in 1936.
