= Barnoti =

- Town
- Location in Jammu and Kashmir, India Barnoti (India)
- Coordinates: 32.43°N 75.43°E
- Country: India
- Union Territory: Jammu and Kashmir
- District: Kathua
- Elevation: 360 m (1,180 ft)

Population (2014)
  - Total: 106,169

Languages
  - Official: Dogri, Hindi
- Time zone: UTC+5:30 (IST)
- Postal code: 184143
- Vehicle registration: JK-08

Barnoti is a town and a newly created naib tehsil in Kathua district in the union territory of Jammu and Kashmir, India. It is situated on the NH 1A, 13 km from District Headquarter.

== Geography ==
Barnoti is located at 32.43°N 75.43°E, It has an average elevation of 360 metres in the foothill of Sivalik Hills range of Himalaya. Barnoti has an area of 363 square kilometers.

== Demographics ==
According to 2011 census India census, Barnoti (Town) had a population of 106,169. Males constituted 55,924 of the population and females 50,245 with 21,202 household.

== Climate ==
The climate of Barnoti is sub tropical, generally experiences extreme rainfall being on windward side of Siwaliks. According to common Hindu belief there are six seasons experienced in the region. Because of its proximity to rivers climate is moderate in summers and harsh in winters. Summers are hot and the mercury may shoot up to 41 degrees while in winters mercury generally dips to 2 degrees or even sometimes to zero. Heavy downpour is also experienced. The annual rainfall is 700 cm mainly in monsoons and winters due to Western Disturbances. Kathua city does not experience snow while there may be snow in upper reaches of district like Bani Tehsil. Heavy hailstorms with piles of hail can be experienced in February and March but are very few. 669 millimetres (26.3 in) in the wettest months.

Climate data for Barnoti (Kathua)
Month	Jan	Feb	Mar	Apr	May	Jun	Jul	Aug	Sep	Oct	Nov	Dec	Year
Record high °C (°F)	26 (79)	31 (88)	36 (97)	41 (106)	43 (109)	43.2 (109.8)	42.5 (108.5)	41 (106)	37 (99)	36 (97)	31 (88)	26 (79)	43.2 (109.8)
Mean daily maximum °C (°F)	18.8 (65.8)	21.9 (71.4)	26.6 (79.9)	32.9 (91.2)	38.3 (100.9)	40.6 (105.1)	35.5 (95.9)	33.7 (92.7)	33.6 (92.5)	31.7 (89.1)	26.8 (80.2)	21.1 (70.0)	30.1 (86.2)
Mean daily minimum °C (°F)	1.2 (34.2)	9.7 (49.5)	13.6 (56.5)	19.0 (66.2)	24.4 (75.9)	26.8 (80.2)	24.5 (76.1)	24.0 (75.2)	23.0 (73.4)	18.4 (65.1)	12.6 (54.7)	8.5 (47.3)	17.7 (63.9)
Record low °C (°F)	−3.9 (25.0)	−2 (28)	3 (37)	6 (43)	7 (45)	13 (55)	13 (55)	8 (46)	12 (54)	4 (39)	2 (36)	−3 (27)	−3.9 (25.0)
Average rainfall mm (inches)	50.0 (1.97)	46.4 (1.83)	53.2 (2.09)	26.3 (1.04)	16.0 (0.63)	51.8 (2.04)	283.4 (11.16)	344.5 (13.56)	123.9 (4.88)	38.1 (1.50)	11.9 (0.47)	42.2 (1.66)	1,087.7 (42.82)
Source 1: BBC Weather
Source 2: IMD

== See also ==
- Akhnoor
- Hiranagar
- Jammu
- Jammu Cantonment
- Jammu tavi
- Nagrota
- Samba, Jammu
- Talab Tillo
