= Duggan, Jammu and Kashmir =

Chandal Chandal
- Village
- Location in Jammu and Kashmir, India Chandal (India)
- Coordinates: 32.73°N 75.72°E
- Country: India
- Union Territory: Jammu and Kashmir
- District: Kathua
- Tehsil: Bani

Population (2011)
  - Total: 1,545

Languages
  - Spoken: Dogri, Pahadi Gadiyali, Pahadi Thakur Language Hindi
- Time zone: UTC+5:30 (IST)
- PIN: 184206

Duggan is a village and municipality in Kathua district of the Indian union territory of Jammu and Kashmir. The town is located 170 kilometres from the district headquarters Kathua & 15 Km From Tehsil Bani. Duggan is also a Block of Tehsil Bani with Large Area & Population. Duggan Village is Famous For "Shri Vasuki Naag Ji Maharaj Yatra".The Ancient Temple of Shri Vasuki Naag Ji Maharaj is Located here.

== Demographics ==
According to the 2011 census of India, Duggan has 275 households. The literacy rate of Duggan village was 50.40% compared to 67.16% of Jammu and Kashmir. In Duggan, Male literacy stands at 65.14% while the female literacy rate was 34.44%.

Demographics (2011 Census)
	Total	Male	Female
Population	1545	809	736
Children aged below 6 years	287	155	132
Scheduled caste	290	150	140
Scheduled tribe	760	390	370
Literacy	50.40%	65.14%	34.44%
Workers (all)	980	519	461
Main workers (total)	844	–	–
Marginal workers (total)	136	67	69

== Transportation ==
=== Road ===
Duggan is directly connected by road. In order to travel from Kathua to Duggan, one has to travel by the Bani-Basoli Road, NH 44 and then walk for some time.

=== Rail ===
The nearest major railway station to Duggan is Govindsar Kathua railway station located at a distance of 200 kilometres respectively.

=== Air ===
The nearest airport to Gundna is Jammu Airport located at a distance of 245 kilometres and is a 7-hour drive.

== See also ==
- Jammu and Kashmir
- Kathua district
- Kathua
