= Hiranagar Fort =

Fort in Hiranagar, Jammu and Kashmir, India

- Part of Forts in India
- Hiranagar, J&K, India
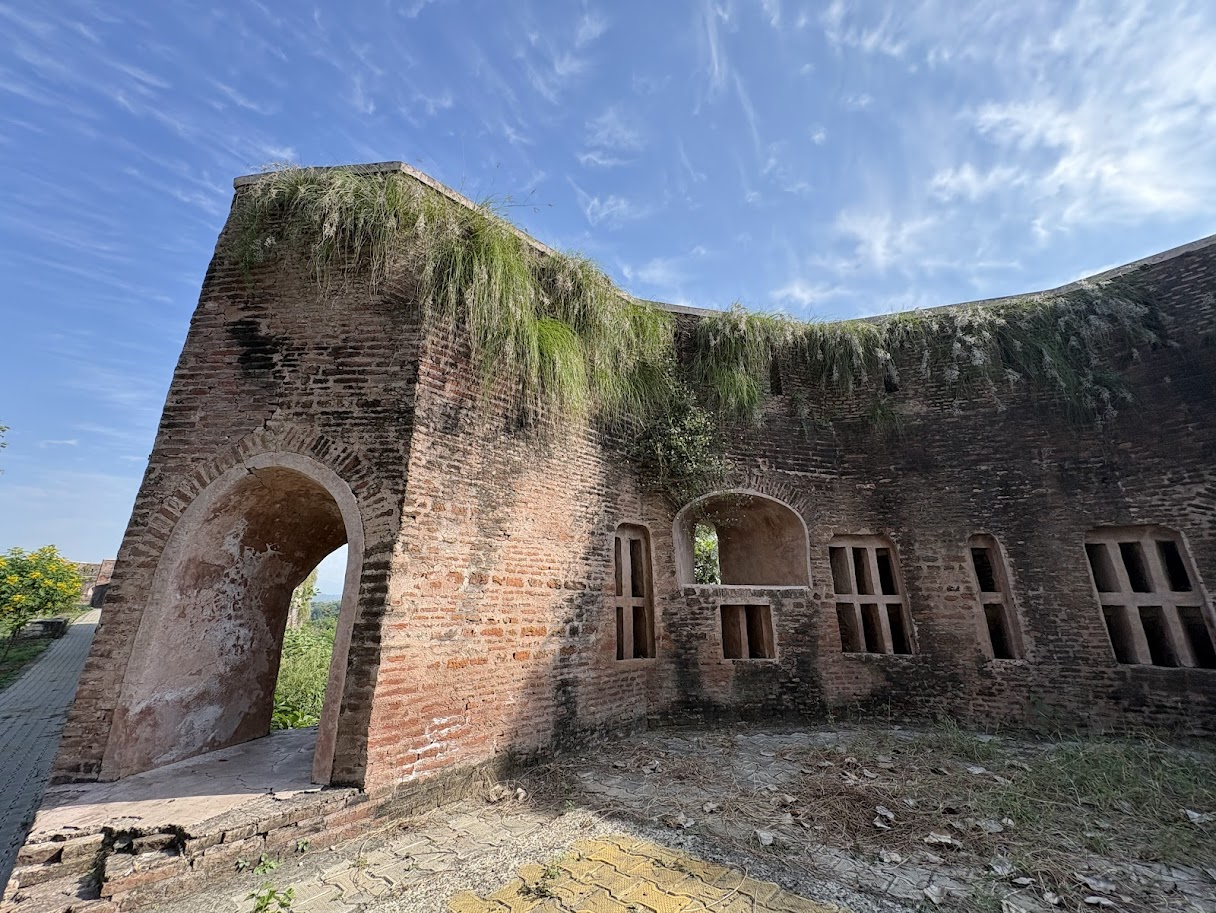
- A section of the fort

Site information
- Type: Fort & Temple
- Open to the public: Yes

Location
- Fort in Hiranagar, J&K, India
- Location within Jammu and Kashmir Location within India
- Coordinates: 32.4618°N 75.2582°E

Site history
- Built by: Raja Hira Singh
- Materials: Lakhori bricks

Garrison information
- Occupants: Temple

The Hiranagar Fort, also known as Jasmergarh Fort, is a historic fort located in the town of Hiranagar in the Kathua district of Jammu and Kashmir, India.

Built in the mid-19th century by Raja Hira Singh, the fort served as an administrative and military center for the region during the Dogra rule. Positioned on a slight elevation, the fort overlooks the surrounding plains and houses remnants of royal architecture, including a palace and prison complex.

== History ==
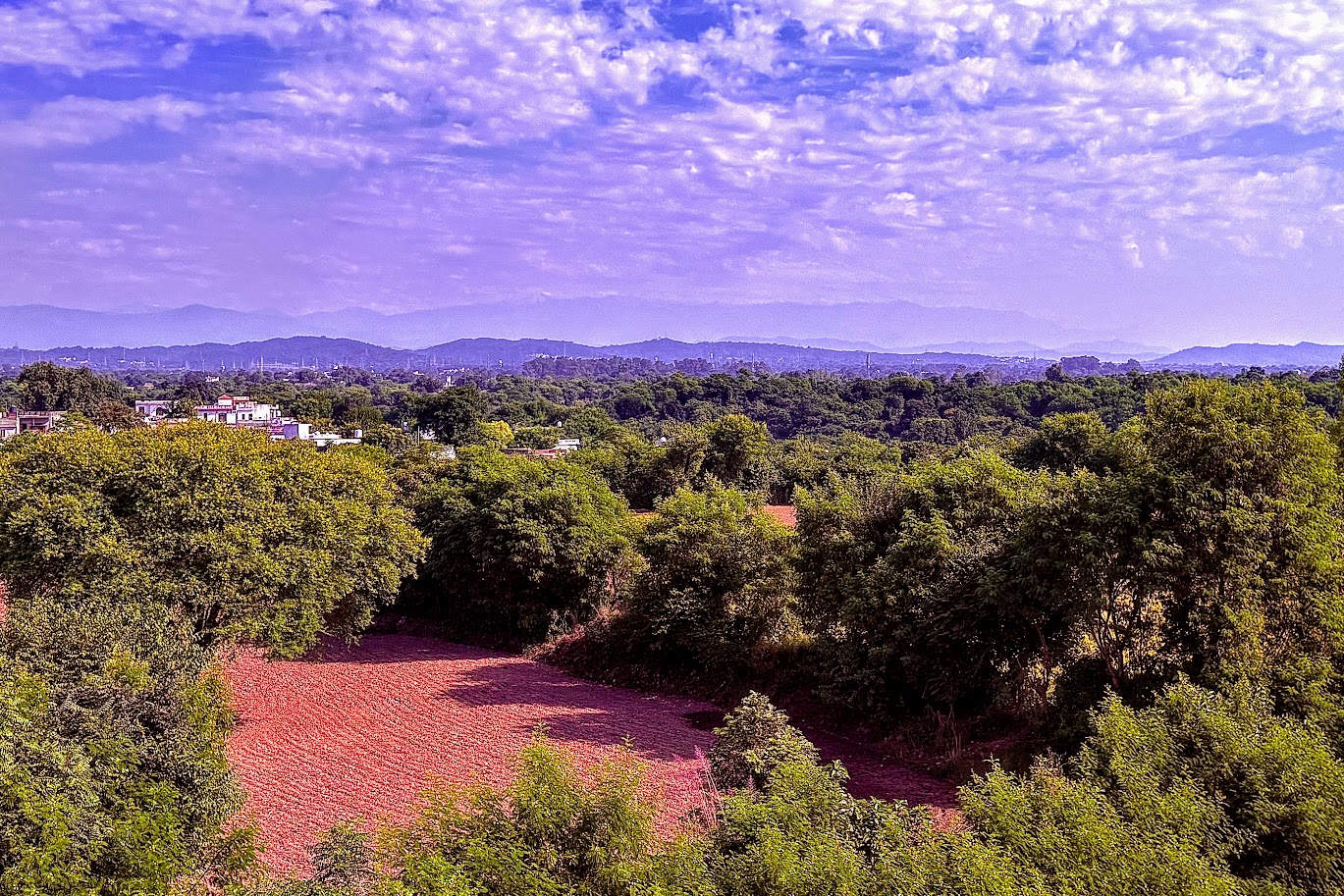
Shivalik hills and distant mountains as seen from the ramparts of the fort.

The fort was constructed in the mid-19th century by Raja Hira Singh, a prominent Dogra noble and the son of Raja Dhyan Singh, the brother of Maharaja Gulab Singh. The fort was built strategically atop a hillock to serve as both a military outpost and an administrative center during the Dogra reign in the Jammu region. Its establishment coincided with the founding of the town of Hiranagar, which was named after Raja Hira Singh himself.

== Present condition ==
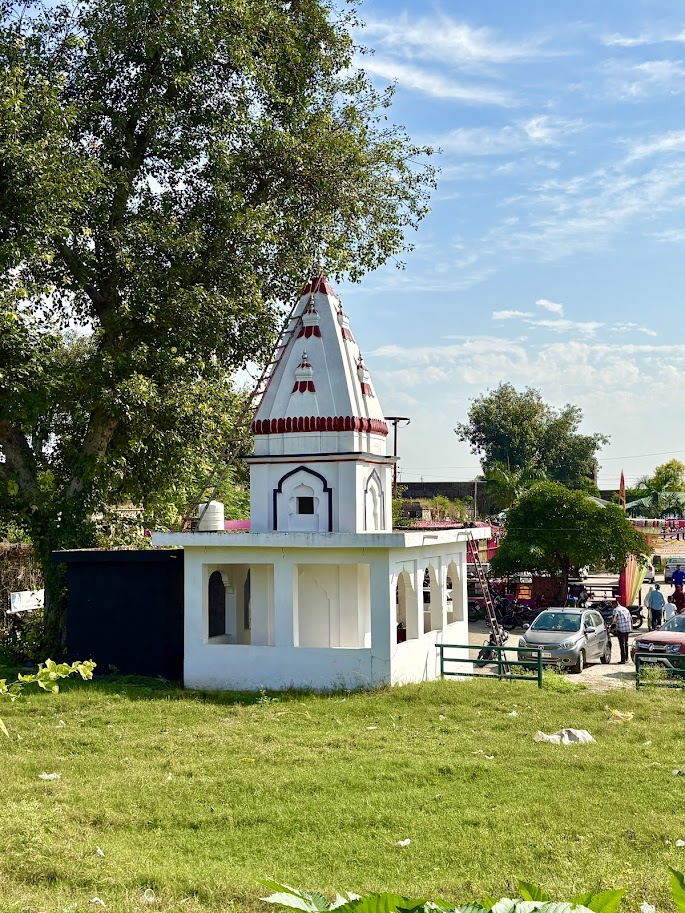
One of the several temples within the fort complex.

The fort is primarily constructed from lakhori bricks and currently stands partially in ruins. Despite this, its elevated ramparts and surviving walls still provide wide views of the surrounding plains.

More recently, local authorities have undertaken beautification and restoration efforts, including wall repairs and pathway improvements, with work initiated under a local MLC's community development fund.

== Mahakali temple ==
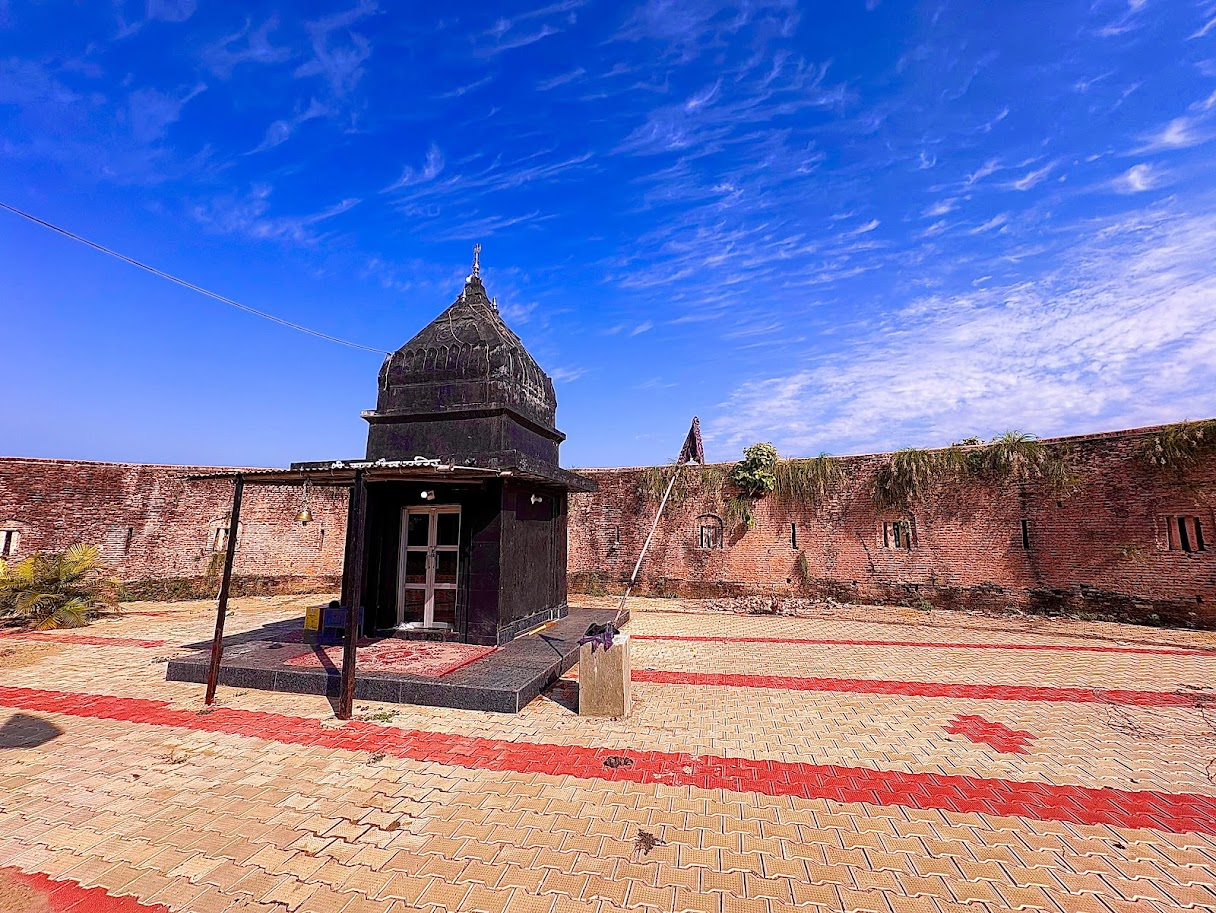
A temple located within the premises of Hiranagar Fort.

Within the fort complex is a temple dedicated to Goddess Mahakali. The temple remains active and is visited by devotees, particularly during festivals such as Navratri.
