= Péter Szalai =

Hungarian tabla player musician

Peter Szalai
- Born: 25 April 1962 (age 64)
- Origin: Budapest, Hungary
- Genres: Indian classical music, world music, jazz
- Occupation: Musician

Péter Szalai (born 25 April 1962) is a Hungarian tabla player musician

== Biography ==
Péter Szalai plays North-Indian classical music and is a notable western tabla musician.

In his childhood he played piano, switching to Indian tabla at age 16.

Szalai studied under Anthony Dass (Delhi gharana) between 1982 and 1984 in both Budapest and India. In 1979/80 he tried himself in two formations, the Creative Studio Five (CSÖ) led by Zoltán Krulik and the Dimension led by László Dés. Beginning in 1980 he worked with the Indian classical music-playing Calcutta Trio (Kozma András sitar, Molnár András tanpura) and the Makám formation (he was also founder of the latter and played in it until 1991).

In 1987 he played as a guest performer at the Jazz Jamboree in Warsaw with the S. Kulpowicz International Band on tabla and on other percussion instruments. In 1988, during a longer Western European tour and recording, he played alongside Albert Mangelsdorf, W. Dauner and the Family of Percussion.

Noted tabla master Ustad Alla Rakha invited him to be his student. He also developed a special master-student bond with Pandit Ravi Shankar.

Aside from being a frequent guest of several Indian music festivals, he has intensive and lasting connections with his master's sons – Ustad Zakir Hussain, Fazal Qureshi and Taufiq Qureshi – even after the death of Ustad Alla Rakha in 2000.

As the member of the Calcutta Trio he plays classical Indian music since 1980 to this day. The club of the formation is still functioning and meets monthly at the Marczibányi Square Cultural Centre.

Besides being the member of the Calcutta Trio, he has given many thousands of concerts since 1980. Many prominent Indian musicians chose him as partner in Europe since the beginning of the 90s: Pr. Debu Choudury, Nandkishor Muley (santur), Gaurav Mazumdar (sitar), Shubhendra Rao (sitar) Ustad Ikhlaq Hussain Khan (sitar) and Debasish Ganguly (sitar).

In 1992, while still playing in a duo, he founded the Tin Tin with Szabolcs Szőke. Since 1994 he is a member of the Tin Tin Quartet and after a small hiatus he returned to the formation in 1997 which was at that time called the Tin Tin Quintet.

In 2000 he contributed together with violinist Zoltán Lantos, jazz guitarist Gábor Juhász and his own student Iván Nyusztay to the establishment of the Samsara Quartet. In 2002 the group also published a record.

At present he is still a wanted musician for jazz productions. Since 2003 he has played in multiple groups, including Mitsoura (Mónika Miczura, András Monori, Márk Moldvai, Miklós Lukács, Éva Mandula), the Miklós Lukács Quintet (Miklós Lukács, Mátyás Szandai, András Dés, Kristóf Bacsó), the M. Trio (Evelin Tóth, Dániel Kardos) and the Rubái Trió (Szabolcs Szőke and Evelin Tóth), among others.

As a guest performer he played at the concerts of Amadinda, the Dresch Quartet, Bea Palya, Ági Szalóki and more. He participated in the production of many records like Peter Ogi, Palle Mikkelborg, Djabe, Tibor Szemző and others.

He considers teaching at RIMPA (Ravi Shankar Institute for Music and Performing Arts) an important part of his work.

He was invited by Zoltán Rácz to the Franz Liszt Music Academy where he teaches classical Indian music theory for classical and jazz music students since 2009.

In 2010 he organised the Spirit and Sound and String and Spirit performer nights with such musicians like Bea Palya, Ági Szalóki, Miklós Lukács, Kálmán Balogh, Rózsa Farkas, and the Miklós Lukács Quintet.

A biographical documentary short film was made in 2011 about Peter Szalai titled Without Sheet Music. A portrait film made in 2013 about him titled Angel in the Details.

(Translated: Balazs Zsigmond Horvath)

== Discography ==
- 1988 Makám: Approaches (tabla, marimba)
- 1988 A. Mangelsdorf, W. Dauner és a Family Percussion (percussions)
- 1991 Szalai–Szőke: Tin Tin (tabla, ektar, anklung, gato-sansa, percussions)
- 1997 Binder Károly : Erózió – soundtrack (tabla, kalimba)
- 1998 James, Stephen – Szalai Péter: Ragas of Pandit Ravi Shankar (tabla)
- 1998 Makám: The shore (tabla, zanza, harangjáték, tabla tarang)
- 1999 The Other Shore (percussions)
- 1999 Calcutta Trió: Classical Indian Music (tabla)
- 2000 Szőke Szabolcs: Sindbad's songs (tabla, percussions)
- 2001 Calcutta Trió: Live in Pesti Vigado (tabla)
- 2002 Szalai- Szőke: Duo concert (tabla, mbira)
- 2002 Lantos Zoltán' Mirrorworld: Tiptoe ceremony (tabla, song)
- 2003 Samsara Quartet: Bindu (tabla)
- 2003 Djabe: Táncolnak a kazlak (tabla)
- 2003 Mitsoura (tabla, ghatam, dholak, khalimba, konakol, percussions)
- 2004 Juhász – Mikkelborg: 60/40 (contributor)
- 2005 Gadó Gábor Quartet: Psyché (contributor)
- 2005 Hungarian Jazz Store (contributor)
- 2007 Dörnyei Gábor: Drums, Music and Friends (contributor)
- 2008 Mitsoura: Dura, Dura, Dura (tabla, nakkara, kalimba, konakol, percussions)
- 2009 Dresch Quartet: Rare Bird (tabla)
- 2009 Rubái (tabla, tabla tárang, chanda, marimbula, vibraton, mbira, angklung, framedrum, konakol)
- 2010 Palya Bea: Én leszek a játékszered (tabla, rattle)
- 2012 Szőke Quintet and David Boato: Via Ilka (tabla, cajon, percussions)

== Filmography ==
- 1988 Hanussen (musician)
- 1992 Zsötem (musician)
- 1992 Erózió (musician)
- 2011 Without sheet music – short film (film starring)
- 2013 Angel in the details – documentary (film starring)
