= Lakhanpur, Jammu =

Lakhanpur Lakhanpur
- Town
- Location in Jammu and Kashmir, India Lakhanpur (India)
- Coordinates: 32.410561°N 75.614403°E
- Country: India
- Union Territory: Jammu and Kashmir
- District: Kathua
- Established: very historic
- Founder: Raja lakhan ji and dogra dynasty
- Named for: lakhanpur

Population (2020)
  - Total: 4,000
- Time zone: UTC+5:30 (IST)
- 184152: 184152
- Vehicle registration: JK-08

Lakhanpur is a town and a notified area committee in Kathua district in the Indian union territory of Jammu and Kashmir. Lakhanpur is the entrance to Jammu and Kashmir from Punjab and rest of India. It is a sparsely populated area about 20 km (12 mi) from the center of Kathua city, and also known for its lakhanpur fort and famous dish called [palle].

== Geography ==
Lakhanpur is situated just below the Sivalik Hills. The town is sandwiched between Ravi river to the south and east while the Shiwaliks rise abruptly 400 metres (1,300 ft) high to the north. The town starts from the Modhopur Ravi bridge and is spread on both the sides of NH1A. Kathua city is just 6 km ahead of Lakhanpur. It is the gateway to the Indian state Jammu and Kashmir.

== Traffic and infrastructure ==
Since the town is an entrance to the state, the infrastructure is well developed with parking, restaurants, banks, ATMs, sanitation facilities and much more. But the traffic problem is difficult, with hours of traffic snarls due to the huge rush of trucks, buses and cars. The toll plaza serves as a source of income to the state as well. Other than one of the major toll collecting plazas in the state, The town is also known for its fort, hence the name Lakhanpur fort which is now turned into a devi temple.

Lakhanpur used to be the place of a major toll of traffic and goods entering the union territory. The toll was officially abolished on January 1, 2020.

== Demographics ==
As of 2001 India census, Lakhenpur had a population of 1521. Males constitute 53% of the population and females 47%. Lakhanpur has an average literacy rate of 77%, higher than the national average of 59.5%: male literacy is 81%, and female literacy is 73%. In Lakhenpur, 12% of the population is under 6 years of age.

== Religion ==
Hindu 89.28%, Sikh 3.18%, Muslim 5.11%.

== See also ==
- Madhopur, Punjab
