= Ghagwal =

- Town
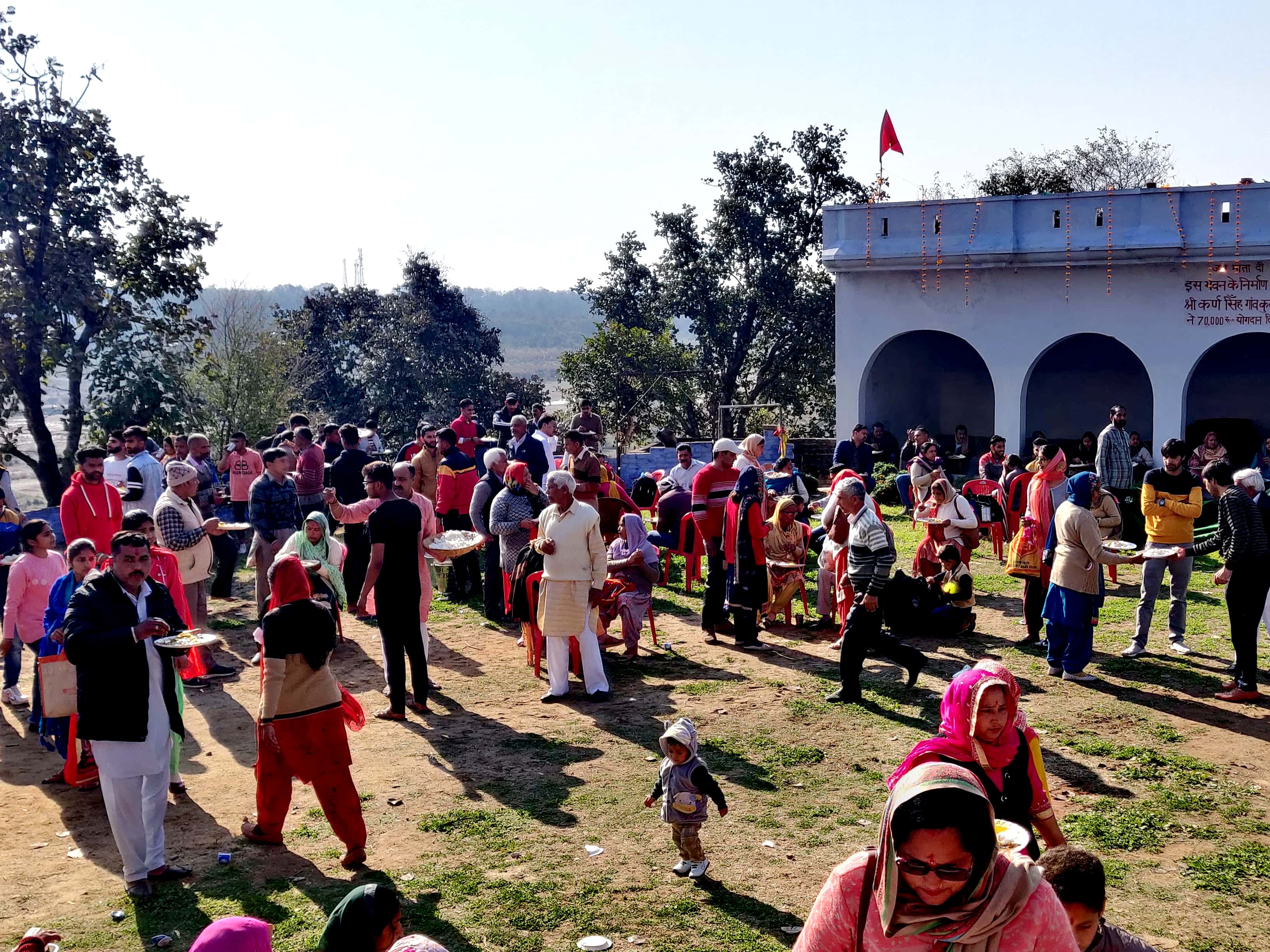
- Kuldevi Mata Rai temple at Village Rai, Tehsil Ghagwal, District Samba, Jammu and Kashmir

- Location in Jammu and Kashmir, India Ghagwal (India)
- Coordinates: 32.51°N 75.20°E
- Country: India
- Union Territory: Jammu and Kashmir
- District: Samba
- Tehsil: Ghagwal

Population (2011)
  - Total: 1,520

Languages
  - Spoken: Dogri, Hindi,
- Time zone: UTC+5:30 (IST)
- PIN: 184141
- Vehicle registration: JK21

Ghagwal is a town and Panchayat in Samba district in the Jammu division of the Indian union territory of Jammu and Kashmir. The town is located 15 kilometres from district headquarters Samba. River Baein flows from east side of Ghagwal. Famous 1750 years old, Narsingh Dham Mandir is situated in Middle of Ghagwal and is also known as "Heart of Ghagwal". Before 2006 Ghagwal was part of Kathua District of Jammu Division. Ghagwal Town is Also Headquarter of Tehsil and Sub Division Office of Ghagwal. Govt. Degree College, Ghagwal is currently functional in Temporary Building.

== Demographics ==
According to the 2011 census of India, Ghagwal has 312 households. The literacy rate of Ghagwal village was 83.56% compared to 67.16% of Jammu and Kashmir. In Kalarooch, Male literacy stands at 91.72% while the female literacy rate was 75.08%.

Demographics (2011 Census)
	Total	Male	Female
Population	1520	788	732
Children aged below 6 years	194	112	82
Scheduled caste	656	335	321
Scheduled tribe	10	4	6
Literacy	83.56%	91.72%	75.08%
Workers (all)	390	354	36
Main workers (total)	288	–	–
Marginal workers (total)	102	97	5

== Transport ==
=== Road ===
Ghagwal is connected to other places in Jammu and Kashmir and India by the Srinagar-Kanyakumari Highway NH-44 .

=== Rail ===
The nearest railway station to Ghagwal is the Ghagwal railway station located in the village.

=== Air ===
The nearest airport is Jammu Airport located at a distance of 45 kilometres and is a 1-hour drive.

== Notable people ==
- Alla Rakha, famous Tabla player

== See also ==
- Jammu and Kashmir
- Samba district
- Samba
