= Mata Sarthal Devi Mandir =

Sarthal Mata
- Ashtdashbhuja Mata

Religion
- Affiliation: Hinduism
- District: Kishtwar
- Province: Jammu Province
- Deity: Goddess Durga
- Festival: Sarthal Yatra
- Status: Opened

Location
- Location: Sarthal, Kishtwar district
- State: Jammu and Kashmir
- Country: India

Architecture
- Founder: Raja Agar Dev
- Creator: Maharaja Hari Singh
- Completed: 1936

Mata Sarthal Devi Mandir is a Hindu temple at Sarthal of Kishtwar district in India's Jammu and Kashmir (union territory) which has an annual pilgrimage known as Sarthal Yatra.

== Overview ==
A Hindu shrine, Sarthal Mata is famous for the annual pilgrimage known as Sarthal Yatra. The idol, considered as re-incarnation of Goddess Durga, was originally carved from stones by locals during the Raja Agar Dev of the Kishtwar period and later, renovated by Maharaja Hari Singh in 1936. It is situated at approximately 6000 feet and usually covered with snow during winters.

=== History ===
According to the local legend, Shri Paul who was the first saint from Kishtwar region, had directed his disciples to worship goddess durga in the form of Mother with 18 Arms. The legend goes on to say that one of the locals was able to invoke goddess in the form of a young girl who pointed towards the eighteen armed idol of goddess. King Agar Dev of Kishtwar is then believed to send his courtiers to make a temple for the idol at an appropriate place. It is said that the Idol became too heavy to be carried beyond its present abode at Sarthal where a Stone Temple was constructed.

=== Management ===
The management of the temple lies with Dharmarth Trust that takes care of the running of the temple. An Inn (Dharamshala) has been constructed next to the temple where pilgrims can stay for the night at nominal payments.

=== Annual Pilgrimage ===
Annual pilgrimage (in the month of July) to the temple is an important event in the local calendar when people from nearby villages throng the temple to receive blessings of the goddess. People bring in tridents (trishul) to the temple. The temple boasts of trident collection that is hundreds of years old. During the Dogra Rule, this pilgrimage was known as "Sarkari Yatra" during which there was a 3-day holiday in entire Doda district for celebration of this yatra. It is considered auspicious to have Mundan (First Hair removal of a baby) at the temple. It has a dedicated vehicular road starting from Hasti (Near Kishtwar) that leads unto the base of temple. The temple is situated on the top of a hillock, and has some difficult stairs to be climbed to reach the top.

=== Sarthal Mata Idol Theft ===
The ancient Asthdash Buja Mata (Mother with 18 arms) black stone Idol of Mata Sarthal Devi was stolen in 1990-1991 from the temple. However, the idol could not be smuggled out of the area and was recovered and reinstalled at the temple. This incident caused anguish amongst the local people.
