= Balouria =

Balouria (Balauria, Balowria, Baloria or Billawaria) is a clan of Chandravanshi Rajputs, claiming descent from the Balauria kings of Basohli princely state. The Chandravanshi Rajputs ruled the modern areas of Billawar, Basohli, and Bhaderwah from around 750 AD until the 19th-century annexation. They derive their name from their kingdom, Balor (now known as Billawar).

Raja Bhogpal, of the Pal dynasty of Kullu, founded Balor, today known as Billawar, in the late 7th century AD. The ruling family of Balor were subsequently known as Balouria. They mostly live in and around Jammu and Kashmir and Himachal Pradesh, in North India. The Balouria clan established the Kingdom of Bashohli, Bhaderwah, Batol and Bhadu in Jammu and Kashmir. Raja Bhupat Pal (1598-1635), Raja Medini Pal (1725-1736), Raja Amrit Pal (1757-1776) were some of the prominent kings among the Balouria rulers. They derive their name from Balaur (modern day Billawar), first capital of the Basohli princely state.
