= Mynta =

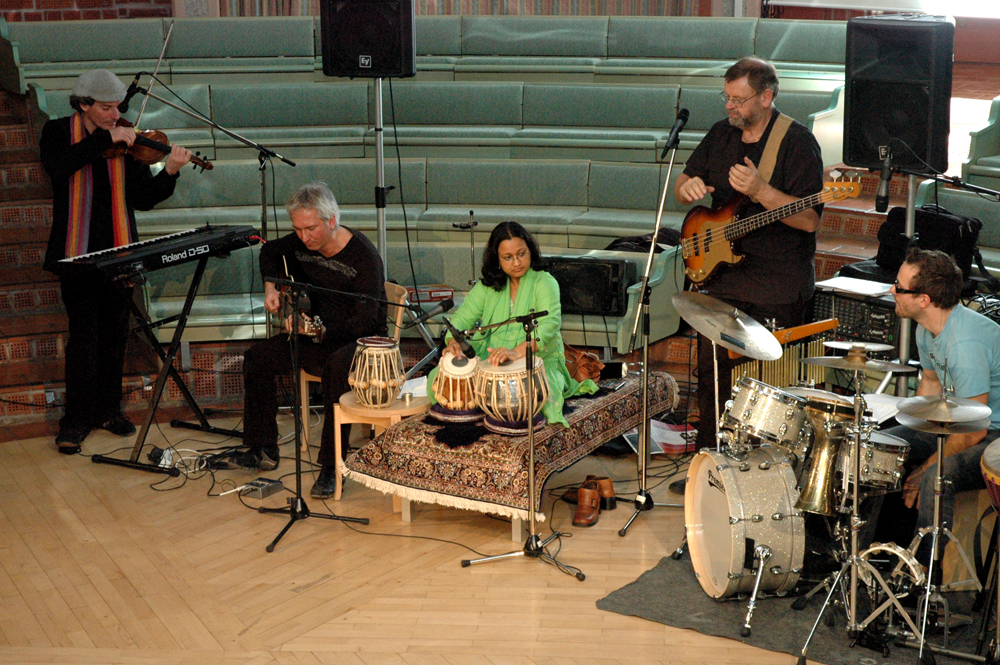
- Mynta playing at Kista Church in northern Stockholm, November 2006

Background information
- Genre: World fusion music
- Years active: 1979- present
- Members: Christian Paulin, Fazal Qureshi, Max Ahman, Dallas Smith, Santiago Jimenez Borges, Sebastian Printz
- Website: Mynta website

Mynta is an Indo-Swedish fusion jazz band which uses Indian vocal, African and Latin-American rhythms, Arabic sounds, Swedish Folkmusic and Cuban violin, together with Indian traditional instruments as tabla, kanjira, ghatam and tampura.

It consists of Santiago Jimenez (violin, keyboard), Dallas Smith (Indian flute, soprano saxophone, clarinet), Christian Paulin (electric bass guitar), Fazal Qureshi (tabla, kanjira), Max Åhman (acoustic guitar) and Sebastian Printz (drums). Mynta is Swedish for mint. The band was originally formed in 1979.

== History ==
The group was founded in 1979 as a jazz band by Christian Paulin (bass), and Mynta moved into a jazz-rock & funk band in the early ‘80s. After performing to rave reviews at Jazz Festivals worldwide, they toured India in '87 where they teamed up with Fazal Qureshi and Shankar Mahadevan, to arrive upon their present sound, a new genre they call 'Nordic Ice with Indian Spice'.

== Members ==
- Fazal Qureshi - tabla, kanjira
- Santiago Jimenez - violin
- Dallas Smith - flute, soprano, clarinet, bansuri
- Max Åhman - acoustic guitar
- Christian Paulin - electric bass
- Sebastian Printz - percussion
- Nandkishor Muley-santur, vocal
- Shankar Mahadevan - vocal

== Discography ==
- 1983: Havanna Club
- 1985: Short conversation
- 1988: Indian Time
- 1991: Hot Madras
- 1994: Is It Possible
- 1994: Nandu's Dance
- 1997: First Summer
- 1999: Mynta Live
- 2001: Cool Nights
- 2003: Teabreak
- 2006: Hot Days
- 2009: Meetings in India
