= Fazal Qureshi =

Indian tabla player (born 1961)

- Born: 13 February 1961 (age 65)
- Origin: Mumbai, Maharashtra, India
- Genres: Hindustani classical music, jazz fusion
- Occupation: Tabla player
- Instruments: Tabla, Kanjira
- Member of: Mynta

Fazal Qureshi (born 13 February 1961) is an Indian tabla player.

== Early life and career ==
Born to tabla player Ustad Allah Rakha in Mumbai, India. Under the guidance of his father and guru, with the inspiration drawn from his elder brother, Ustad Zakir Hussain, (9 March 1951 – 15 December 2024), "who was like a 'chhatt (roof)' to both younger brothers", he has also become a tabla player.

Fazal Qureshi started learning tabla from his father, Alla Rakha, at age 15 or 14. The father, Ustad Alla Rakha had such a busy professional schedule, the two younger brothers of Zakir Hussain mostly depended on him to learn much of their tabla-playing techniques from him. Both younger brothers now miss his support very much. Fazal Qureshi has expanded his horizons by being involved with other styles of music of the world especially jazz and western classical music, and has performed with many well-known jazz musicians. For the last 16 years, he has been associated with Mynta, his world music band based in Sweden. They have performed all over the world and have released six albums.

He teaches tabla to students in the Ustad Alla Rakha Institute of Music near Shivaji Park, Dadar, Mumbai. This institute, now run by Fazal Qureshi in 2019, was launched by Alla Rakha himself in 1985.

== Personal life ==
Fazal is married to Birwa, an interior designer from school of interior design, CEPT UNI, and a folk dancer. They have a daughter, Alia, who is studying ballet, and a son, Azann, who is learning piano.
