= Sukrala Mata Mandir =

Hindu temple dedicated to Goddess in Kathua district, Jammu Kashmir, India

Coordinates: 32.6533°N 75.5880°E

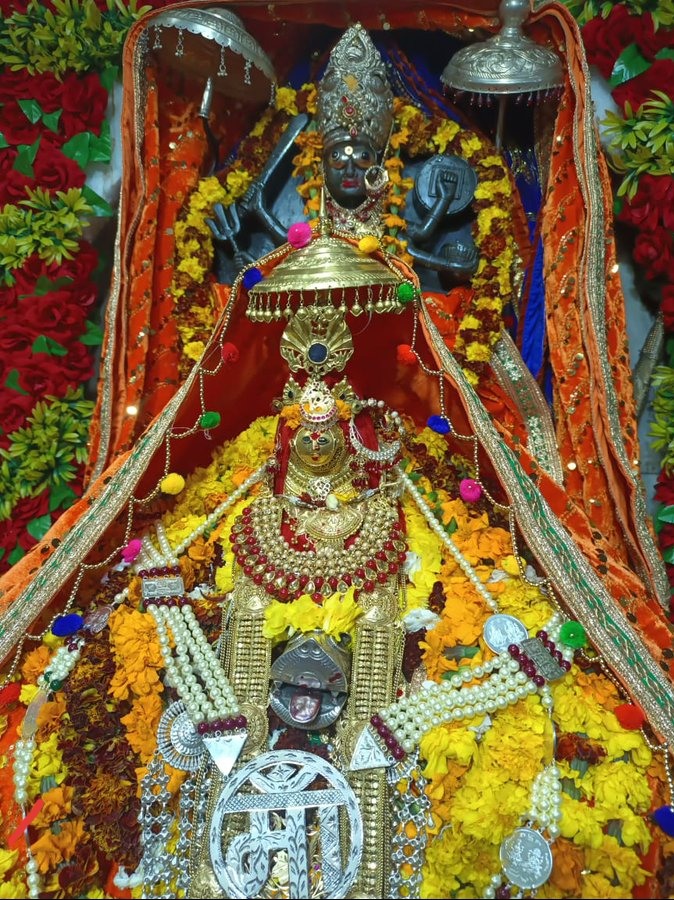

Religion
- Affiliation: Hinduism
- District: Kathua
- Deity: Goddess Sukrala Devi
- Festival: Navaratri

Location
- Location: Billawar To Najot
- Country: India
- Interactive map of Sukrala Mata Mandir

Website
- shrimalmatasukraladevidharmiktrust.com/index.php

Sukrala Mata Mandir is a revered Hindu temple dedicated to the goddess Sukrala Mata (also known as Mal Mata), a form of Sharada Devi, worshipped in the Duggar region. The temple is located on a hillock at Sukrala village near Najot village north of Billawar town, Kathua district, in Jammu division. The shrine dedicated to the goddess was built by rulers of Jammu and Chamba princely states. Myriads of devotees flock to pay obeisance to the goddess during Navratri festival.

== Location ==
Located in the Sukrala village, and it is called the smallest village of Mal Village. It is near the town of Billawar and the village of Najot in the district of Kathua. The district of Kathua is located within the Jammu division within the state of Jammu and Kashmir, India. The Sukrala Mata Mandir, a temple of immense religious significance and natural beauty. This ancient shrine is dedicated to Goddess Sukrala Mata, a revered deity in the region, and attracts devotees from far and wide. The temple is located at height of 3500 feet and its surroundings are a treat for nature lovers, with lush green forests, rolling hills, and a serene atmosphere.

== Local tradition and history ==
According to local legend, Goddess Sukrala Mata is a manifestation of either Goddess Sharada of Kashmir or combined form of Tridevi. The Goddess manifested at this spot on request of local devotee named Trilochan. Pandit Suraj Narayan, the Guru of celebrated Dogra court poet Devi Dutt (also known as Dattu), established a Shri-yantra at Sukrala Mata Mandir. A temple on the site was rebuilt by Raja Madho Singh, the banished Prince of Chamba state. The temple was later on renovated and expanded by installation of a Vigraha of Goddess Mahishasuramardini in 1755 AD by Dogra ruler Raja Brajrajdev, who was son of Raja Ranjitdev of Jammu.

== Temple architecture ==
The Sukrala Mata Mandir is an exemplary example of Dogra architecture, blending traditional and medieval styles of Krimachi temples. The temple's facade is adorned with intricate carvings and ornate decorations, while its interior features a beautifully crafted Vigraha of the Goddess.

== Festivals and celebrations ==
The temple celebrates various festivals throughout the year, including Chaitra Navaratri and Aashwin Navratri. During these times, the temple is adorned with vibrant decorations, and devotees throng to offer prayers and seek the Goddess's blessings.

== Culture and influences ==
Goddess Sukrala Devi is highly revered in the Dogra society. In 18th century, the notable Dogri poet and priest Shiva Ram composed an eight-line poem titled "Jai Ho Bar Daat" (Hail O Boon-Giver) in reverence to Goddess Sukrala Devi. The language of this poem is mix of Sanskrit, Dogri and Braj Bhasha.

In Dogra tradition, Goddess Sukrala Devi is regarded as elder sister of Goddess Vaishno Devi.

== See also ==
- Vaishno Devi
- Vaishno Devi Temple
- Bahu Fort
- Amarnath Temple
