= Alla Rakha =

Indian tabla player (1919–2000)

Ustad Alla Rakha
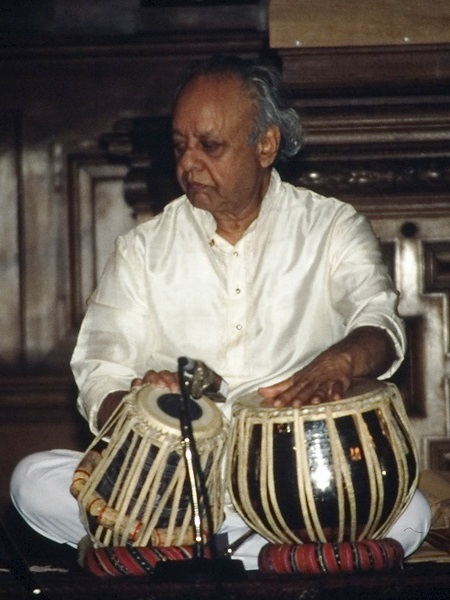
- Alla Rakha, 1988
- Born: Allah Rakha Qureshi; 29 April 1919; Ghagwal, Jammu Province, Kingdom of Jammu and Kashmir, British Raj (now in Jammu and Kashmir, India)
- Died: 3 February 2000 (aged 80); Mumbai, Maharashtra, India
- Occupations: Tabla, Pakhawaj player
- Known for: Hindustani classical music
- Notable credit(s): Performed with Ravi Shankar, Zakir Hussain, Aditya Kalyanpur
- Children: Zakir Hussain; Fazal Qureshi; Taufiq Qureshi
- Awards: Padma Shri Award by the Government of India in 1977; Sangeet Natak Akademi Award in 1982
- Website: allarakhafoundation.org

Alla Rakha Qureshi (29 April 1919 – 3 February 2000) was an Indian tabla player who specialised in Hindustani classical music. Widely revered as one of history's most iconic players of the tabla, belonging to Punjab gharana of tabla players.

He was a frequent accompanist of sitar player Pandit Ravi Shankar and was largely responsible for introducing tabla to the Western audience.

== Personal life and education ==
Allah Rakha Qureshi was born on 29 April 1919 in Ghagwal village in the Jammu Province of the princely kingdom of Jammu and Kashmir under British Raj; today located in the Samba District of the union territory of the same name in India. His mother tongue was Dogri and his family were Muslim Dogras, although most of the Dogra clan around them were Hindus. Growing up on a farm, Ustad Alla Rakha was always in awe of music, praising the travelling musicians he would occasionally have the opportunity to witness. His father, at that time, looked down upon singing or learning to play a musical instrument as a profession for his boy, due to his family's origins as Dogras of Jammu.

At the age of 12, Ustad Alla Rakha ran away from home to stay with his uncle in the nearby Gurdaspur city to pursue his passion for music. Finding little chances for grooming and appreciation, the determined young lad began his training in tabla with Mian Kader Baksh of the Punjab gharana of tabla players. Mian Kadir Bakhsh, who had no sons, formally adopted Alla Rakha and called him the next head of the Punjab gharana of tabla players (a 'gharana' is a community of musicians sharing a distinctive musical style).

Alla Rakha also took vocal training in classical music and Raag Vidya under Ustad Ashiq Ali Khan of the Patiala gharana. His regimen of practice and dedication were legendary: hours upon hours of hard, disciplined practice, that would later pay off. He performed at All India Radio in Lahore as a staff artist in 1936 and was later transferred to All India Radio in Bombay in 1938. In 1943, he quit that job and started working for the Bombay film industry, also known as Bollywood these days, and composed music for nearly two dozen Urdu/Hindi and Punjabi films. By 1958, he had become disillusioned with the film industry and started focusing more on classical music.

He was married to his cousin Bavi Begum and the couple had three sons, Zakir Hussain, Fazal Qureshi and Taufiq Qureshi; two daughters, Khurshid Aulia née Qureshi and Razia; and nine grandchildren. They all survived him except Razia; it was the news of her death a day earlier that is thought to have caused his fatal heart attack.

Allah Rakha had a third daughter named Roohi Bano (1951–2019) who was born in Pakistan and achieved a "legendary" status in television and film acting in that country.

== Career ==
Ustad Alla Rakha began his career as an accompanist in Lahore and then as an All India Radio, Delhi staffer in 1936 but later moved to Bombay in 1940, playing the station's first ever tabla solo and elevating the instrument's position in the process. Soon after, he also started composing music for Hindi/Urdu films under the name A. R. Qureshi. He composed for a total of 23 films between 1943 and 1964.

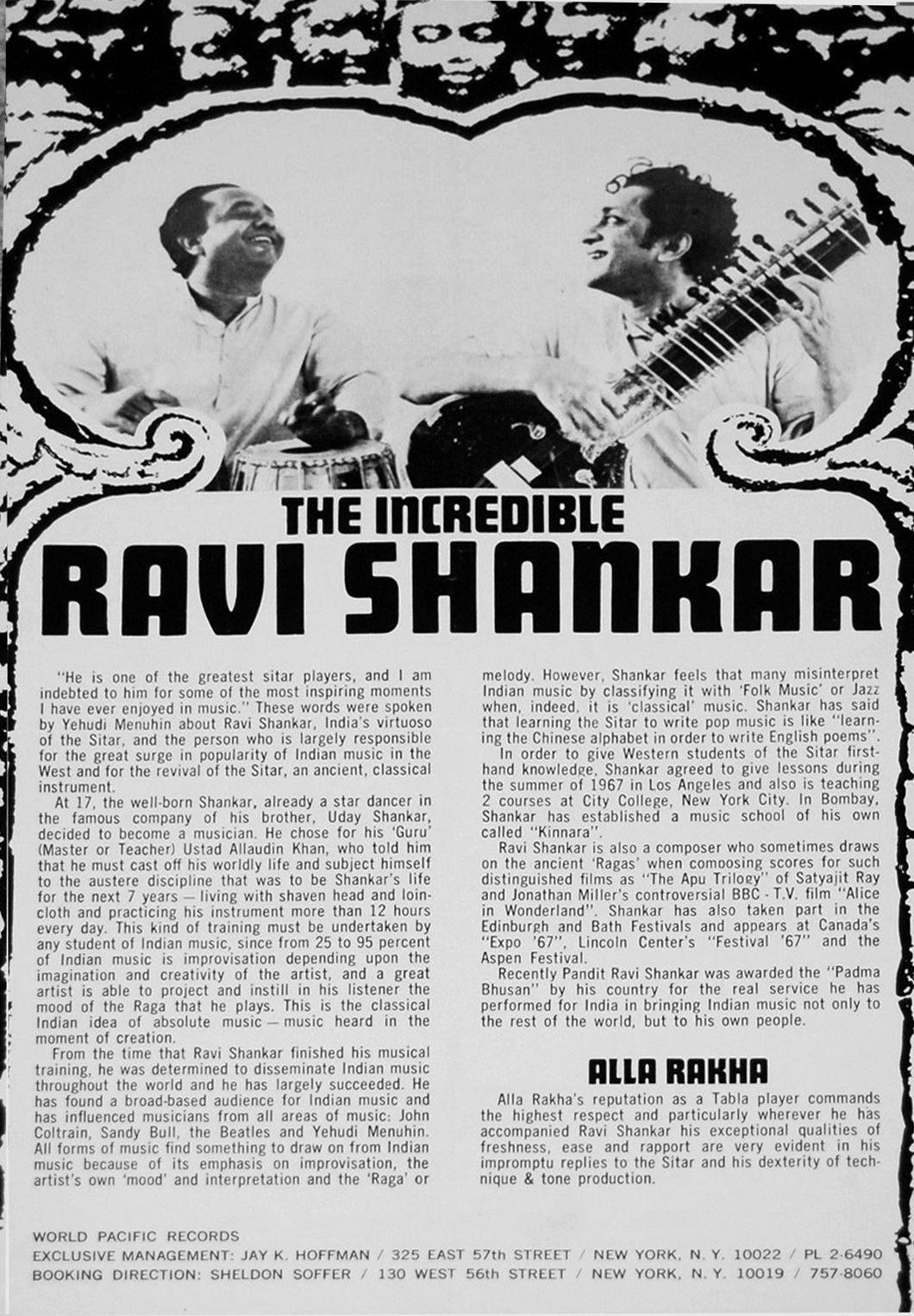
Flyer for an October 1967 concert by Shankar and Rakha (left), held four months after their performance at the Monterey Pop Festival

However, he still played as an accompanist, for soloists like Bade Ghulam Ali Khan, Allauddin Khan, Vilayat Khan, Vasant Rai, Ali Akbar Khan, and Ravi Shankar. The master achieved world renown as Shankar's chief accompanist during his apex in the 1960s, delighting audiences in the West with his wizardry, not only as an accompanist with timing and sensitivity but also as a soloist where he was a master of improvisation, a composer and an electric showman.

His musical partnership with Ravi Shankar was particularly successful and lasted nearly three decades, and their legendary and spellbinding performances at the Monterey Pop Festival in 1967 and the Woodstock Festival in 1969 served to introduce classical Indian music to general audiences worldwide.

Alla Rakha also was a devoted music teacher. He founded 'Alla Rakha Institute of Music' in Mumbai in 1985.

== Global influence ==
Alla Rakha popularised the art of tabla, playing across the globe, elevating the status and respect of this instrument. "Abbaji" (as he was affectionately known by his disciples) also bridged the gap between Carnatic music and Hindustani music by playing with both renowned Carnatic musicians and other Hindustani stalwarts. Ravi Shankar and Alla Rakha duo represented India at several international music festivals.

Leading American percussionists in rock n' roll, such as the Grateful Dead's Mickey Hart, admired him and studied his technique, benefiting greatly even from single meetings. Hart, a published authority on percussion in world music, said: "Allah Rakha is the Einstein, the Picasso; he is the highest form of rhythmic development on this planet." Rakha also collaborated with jazz drummer Buddy Rich on their 1968 album Rich à la Rakha.

Alla Rakha's partnership with Ravi Shankar began in the early 1950s. He was part of the ensemble accompanying Ravi Shankar during George Harrison's Concert for Bangladesh shows, held in New York City in August 1971. The success of the live album and concert film from this event presented Indian classical music to a wide audience in the West. He also collaborated and shared the stage with many leading figures in Indian music like sitar player Vilayat Khan and sarod player Ali Akbar Khan.

He was also featured in a Google doodle on 29 April 2014, on the occasion of his 95th birthday.

== Awards and recognition ==
- Padma Shri in 1977
- Sangeet Natak Akademi Award in 1982
- T. Chowdiah Award in 2000

== Death and legacy ==
Qureshi died on 3 February 2000 at his Simla House residence on Nepean Sea Road following a heart attack, which he suffered on learning of the death of his daughter, Razia, the previous evening during cataract surgery.

In his obituary, The New York Times called him "the most important tabla drummer of his generation". The newspaper further stated that Alla Rakha was given the title Ustad or master musician and teacher of the art of tabla playing. Alla Rakha... "used his skill to invigorate every musician who shared the stage with him."

The Then-Prime Minister of India Atal Bihari Vajpayee also issued a formal statement regretting the loss in his death.

== See also ==
- Zakir Hussain
- Kishan Maharaj
- Anokhelal Mishra
- Samta Prasad
- Yogesh Samsi
- Peter Szalai

== Sources ==
1. Inlay notes to A Life Story of a Genius compilation CD set (Saregama India Ltd, 2006)
