= Lalotra =

The Lalotra is a Hindu Rajput clan found mainly in the Indian states of Punjab, Himachal Pradesh and Jammu and Kashmir. The Lalotra's were also found in Sialkot District, and these Lalotra's immigrated to India at the time of the Partition of India. They are a Dogra sub-group, and their customs are similar to other Dogras.

== Origin ==
The Lalotra Rajput clan has been emerged from Jasrotia sub-caste of Rajputs, and is considered as a superior Rajput clan of Jammu or Dogra circle.

Raja Lal dev of Jasrotia Rajput clan is known to be the founder of the Lalotra Rajput community also known as the Lion community.

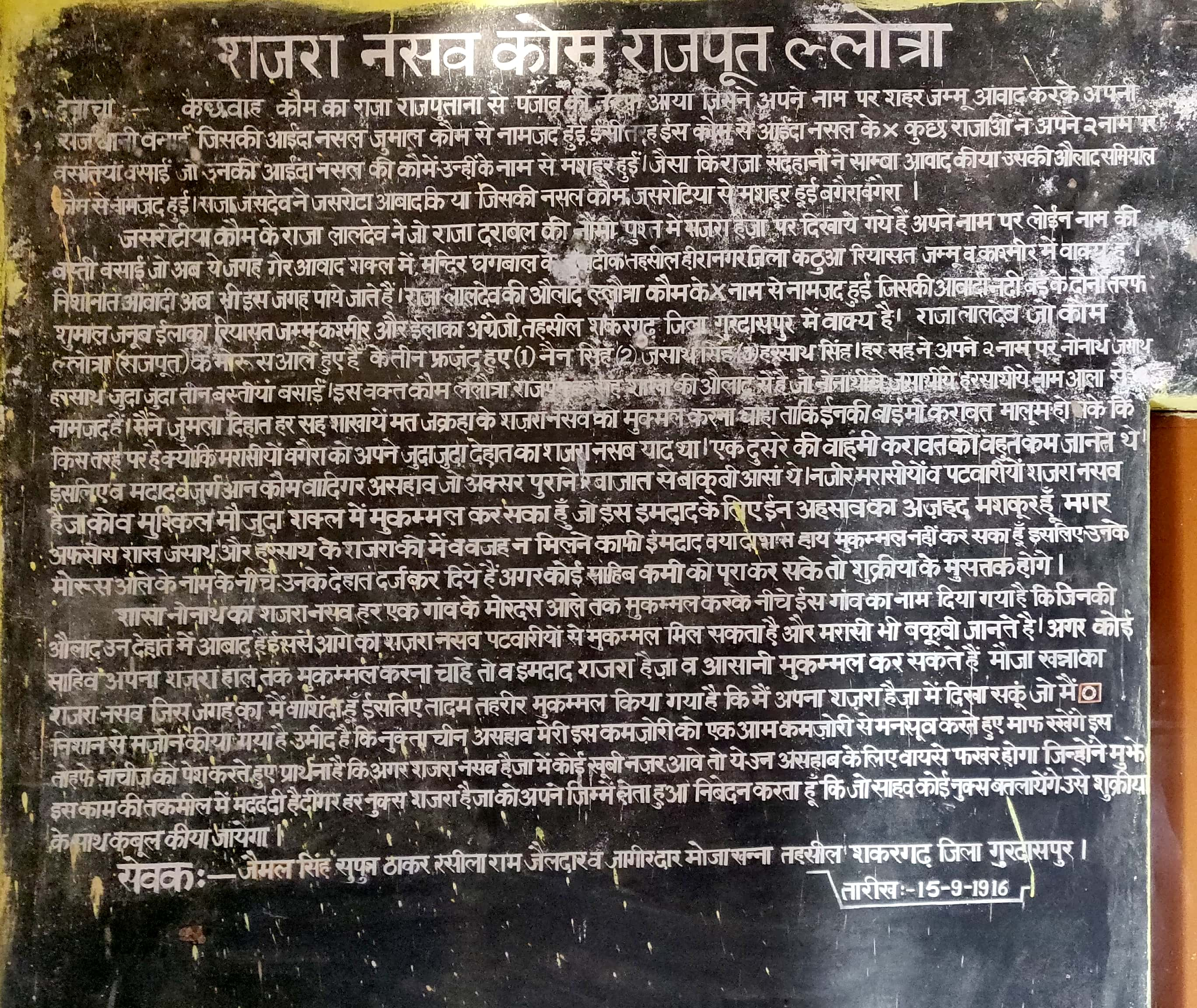
Actual Genealogy written over the wall of the Mata Rai(Kuldevi of Lalotra's Clan) Temple Hall.

== See also ==
- Dogra Rajput
- Dogras
- Dogra dynasty
