= Bani, India =

Bani
- Town and Tehsil
- Location in Jammu and Kashmir, India Bani (India)
- Coordinates: 32.70°N 75.80°E
- Country: India
- Union Territory: Jammu and Kashmir
- District: Kathua
- Time zone: UTC+5:30 (IST)
- PIN: 184206

Bani is a hill station and a tehsil in the Kathua district of Jammu and Kashmir, India.

== Geography and Climate ==
Bani is situated at an altitude of 1,280 metres (4,200 ft). The town lies in a narrow glaciated valley along the Sewa River.

With its altitude and topography, the climate of Bani lies in the temperate to alpine category (Köppen Dfb). Winters are long and cold, with temperatures falling to or below freezing and snowfall occurring in the tehsil. Summers are short, moderately warm and receive the bulk of precipitation from the July-August monsoon, in addition to winter precipitation from western disturbances.

== Flora & Fauna ==
The tehsil is surrounded by surrounded by mountains and dense forests of deodar, pine, and oak. Around two‐thirds of the tehsil area is forested.

The forests of Bani are home to a diverse range of wildlife species. Among the mammals found in the region are the leopard, himalayan black bear, musk deer, himalayan tahr, langur, wild cat, and porcupine. Some of these species are considered to be at risk of extinction. The area also supports a rich bird population, including species such as the chakor, teeter, koel, neel, and kolser, which are commonly sighted in the forests.
