= Central administration =

Leading or presiding body of an organization

Central administration is the leading or presiding body over an organization and the highest administrative department which oversees all lower departments.

== Education ==
In most cases, a school or school district will have a leading group of people as a part of central administration. These positions may include a Superintendent (education), chief operating officer, school headmaster, and/or other leadership roles in one or more specific department. People in central administration are usually appointed by a board, such as a Board of Education. They are comparable to positions such as a chief executive officer. Central administrative staff have an executive oversight and supervision of school and/or school district administration. The department exists in universities as well, also playing a key role in its organization. The department is often tasked with data protection, disaster control planning, and other areas.

== Government ==
Central administration is also a key part of the civil service in many countries; in the United Kingdom, the department supports the chief executive's office and other key areas. In the United States, many branches of government have a central administration department. For instance, in correctional facilities, the office of the director is under its tutelage. In various countries, administration plays a crucial role in state functions. For example, in India, it is pivotal in the functioning of the civil service. Its decisions directly impact the citizens of the country, such as regarding taxation and drafting new laws. The department also plays a key role in making critical decisions for many countries; in Pakistan, there has been a discussion about whether the government should bring rebellious minded tribal areas under tighter control of central administration.

== Organizations ==
In many other organizations, a “central administration” department plays a key role in its function. In the information technology sector, central administration is a key resource, along with development teams. Central administration departments are often tasked with providing crucial IT support to various organizations. The nature of the role means the professionals have high-level access to IT systems (domain admins, etc.), as they need to perform functions that include the creation and amending of user accounts.

== Software ==
Central administration refers to people within a department as well as consoles, applications, and other tools that help it function. It is a part of Windows SharePoint server; This system allows system administrators or those within central administration departments to prioritize various tasks, as well as allowing users to view resources and current services.

== See also ==
- English law
- Chief administrative officer
- Chief executive officer
- Superintendent (education)
- Chief operating officer
- Executive director
- Senior management
- Board of directors
- Trustee
- Board of education
- Board of governors
