= Parole, India =

Parole Parole
- Town
- Location in Jammu and Kashmir Parole (India)
- Coordinates: 32°20′49″N 75°26′03″E
- Country: India
- Union Territory: Jammu and Kashmir
- District: Kathua
- Tehsil: Parole
- Elevation: 274 m (899 ft)

Population (2011)
  - Total: 11,856

Languages
  - Official: Hindi, Dogri
- Time zone: UTC+5:30 (IST)
- PIN: 184151
- Vehicle registration: JK08

Parole is a town, tehsil and notified area committee, near Kathua city in Kathua District in the Indian union territory of Jammu and Kashmir. It is just 10 km from Kathua city, the district headquarter.

== Geography ==
Nagri Parole is located on the right bank of a tributary of the Ravi River called Biju by the locals. It has an average elevation of 274 m (899 ft). It is 10 km (6.2 mi) from Kathua City. It is a religious town surrounded by temples of many gods. On the one side there is Lord Shiva temple at a distance of 3 km (1.9 mi) from Nagri in the village Airwan. While on the other side this town is blessed by Mata Bala Sundri. There is one more religious place called Chhattar Shah where people come to get themselves blessed by Baba Chhattar Shah. Every year a lot of people come to these religious places to get blessings. Nagri parole is one of the most beautiful tehsils in the Union Territory of Jammu and Kashmir. Nagri Parole has its boundary with Fatehpur village of Punjab's Pathankot district. Therefore, it is also called a gateway of Jammu and Kashmir.

== Demographics ==
As of 2011 India census, Nagri Parole had a population of 7,681. Males constituted 52.5% of the population and females 47.5%. Parole had an average literacy rate of 69.5%, higher than the national average of 64.8%: male literacy is 74.3%, and female literacy was 64.18%. In 2011, 11.4% of the population of Parole was under six years of age. Hindus constitute 96.41% of the population, where as Sikhs, Christians and Muslims constitute 0.20%, 2.58% and 0.66% respectively.
