= Billawar =

- Town
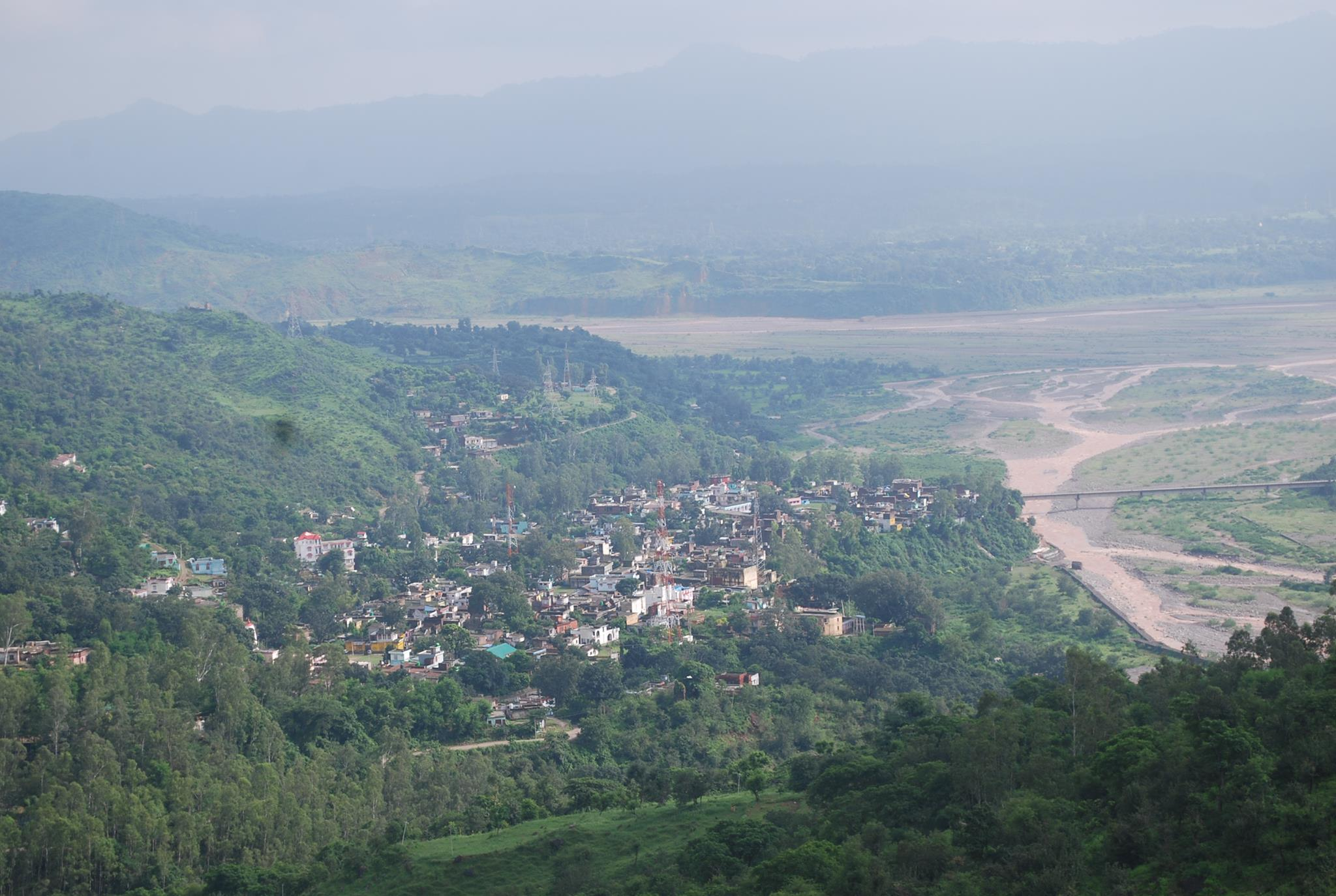

- Location in Jammu and Kashmir, India Billawar (India)
- Coordinates: 32.62°N 75.62°E
- Country: India
- State: Jammu and Kashmir
- District: Kathua

Government
  - MLA: Pt. Satish Kumar Sharma
- Elevation: 844 m (2,769 ft)

Population (2011)
  - Total: 11,916
- Time zone: UTC+5:30 (IST)
- PIN: 184204
- Vehicle registration: JK08

Billawar is a town and a notified area committee in Kathua district of the Indian Union Territory of Jammu and Kashmir.

Billawar was founded by Raja Bhog Pal in the 7th century A.D., it was a kingdom and its capital was Basohli until the 11th century.

== Geography ==
Billawar is located at 32.62°N 75.62°E. It has an average elevation of 844 m (2,769 ft). Billawar town is situated in the lap of the Shivalik mountains between the banks of the Naz and Bheeni rivulets, approximately 70 km from Dayala Chak on Delhi-Jammu NH-1A.

== Billawar tehsil ==
The Billawar tehsil (1 of 8 tehsils) of Kathua district has 46 panchayat villages.

== History ==
Raja Bhog Pal, a son of the king of Kullu Valley, founded Basohli and established Billawar as the capital in 765 A.D. after subduing Rana Billo, a feudal chief who once ruled the area. The ruling house was subsequently known as Balouria, deriving from Balor. The old name of Billawar was "Vallapura" as mentioned in Rajtarangni of Kalhana Pandita written in 1148 CE.

Religion in Billawar (2011)
1. Hinduism (88.2%)
2. Islam (9.68%)
3. Other / Not stated (2.11%)

== Demographics ==
As of the 2011 India census, Billawar had a population of 11,916. Billawar has two boroughs - old Billawar town and Phinter area. Males constitute 56% of the population and females 44%. Billawar has an average literacy rate of 72%, higher than the national average of 59.5%; with male literacy rate of 78% and female literacy rate of 58%. 12% of the population is under six years of age. The major religions in Billawar are Hinduism (88.2%) and Islam (9.7%).

== Places of interest ==
Billawar is known for Sukrala Devi, and Sukrala Mata Mandir is a major attraction of this region. Several devotees throng the shrine during Navaratri.
