= Hiranagar =

- Town
- Hiranagar
- Location in Jammu and Kashmir, India Hiranagar (India)
- Coordinates: 32.45°N 75.27°E
- Country: India
- Union Territory: Jammu and Kashmir
- District: Kathua
- Tehsil: Hiranagar

Government
  - Body: Municipal council
- Elevation: 308 m (1,010 ft)

Population (2011)
  - Total: 8,249

Languages
  - Official: Dogri, Hindi
- Time zone: UTC+5:30 (IST)
- PIN: 184142
- Telephone code: 01922

Hiranagar is a town and a notified area committee, near Kathua city in Kathua district in the Indian union territory of Jammu and Kashmir. It is a tehsil headquarters. It is named after Dogra Rajput Raja Hira Singh, son of Raja Dhyan Singh and nephew of Maharaja Gulab Singh.

== History ==
Raja Hira Singh, the nephew of Maharaja Gulab Singh, is believed to have founded the town after his name when he was bestowed with the jagir of Jasrota. He also renovated the Jasmergarh Fort situated between Tarnah and Bein Nallahs. The fort also housed the tehsil and other government offices prior to 1947. Later the offices were moved to Hiranagar.

== Geography ==
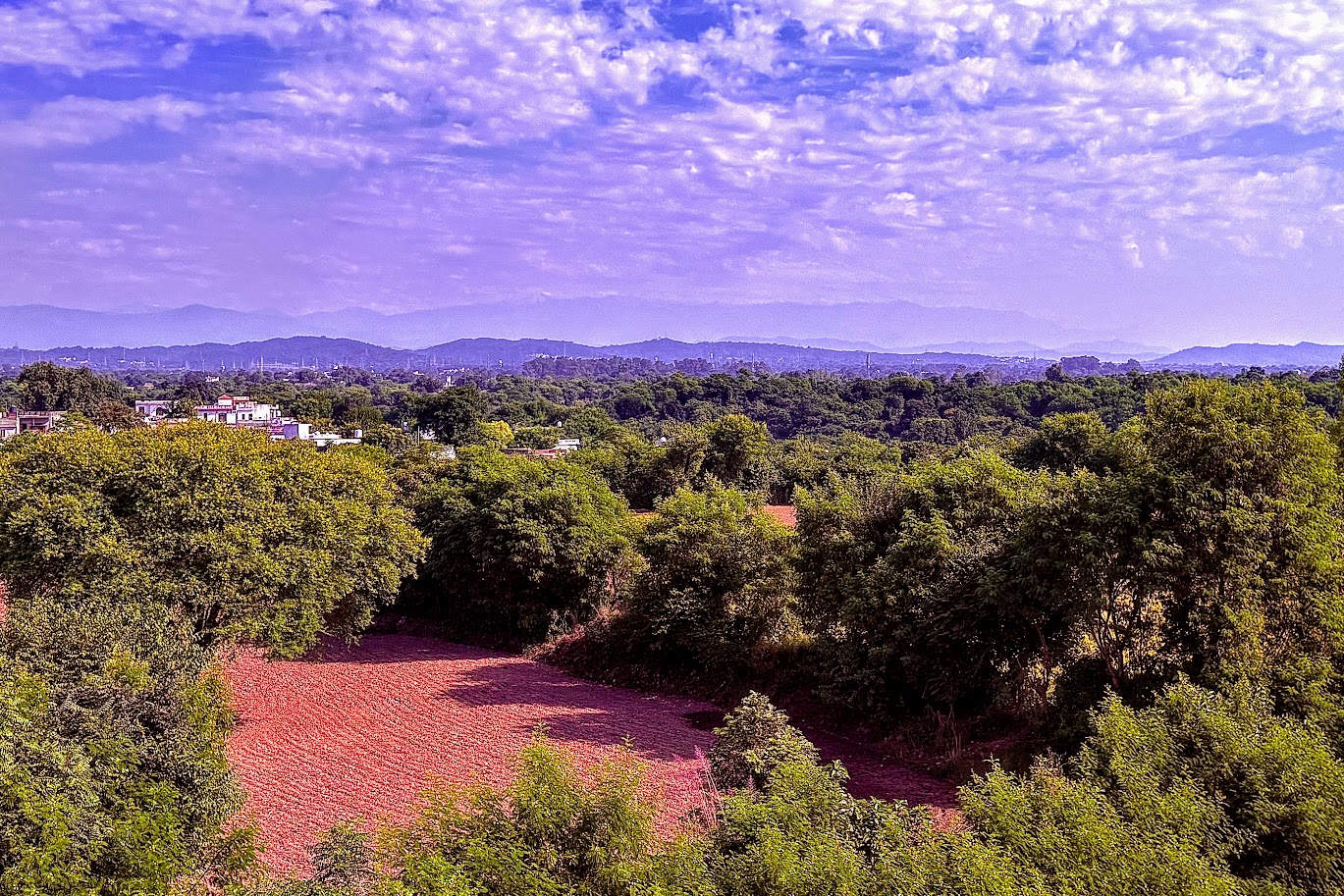
Shivalik hills and Pir Panjal range as seen from the ramparts of the Hiranagar fort.

Hiranagar is located at 32.45°N 75.27°E. It has an average elevation of 308 metres (1010 feet).

== Demographics ==
Religion-wise population distribution
1. Hindu (97.5%)
2. Muslim (0.81%)
3. Christian (1.04%)
4. Sikh (0.51%)
5. Buddhist (0.04%)
6. No religion specified (0.12%)
- Hiranagar Subdivision has total population of 8,294 according to the 2011 Indian Census. Out of which 4,526 are Males while number of Females is 3,768
- Average sex ratio of the Subdivision is 833
- No. of Families residing in the Subdivision is 1,723
- Child Sex Ratio 792'

Religion based Demographics

Hindu	8,086	(97.49%)	4,396	3,690
Muslim	67	(0.81%)	54	13
Christian	86	(1.04%)	45	41
Sikh	42	(0.51%)	25	17
Buddhist	3	(0.04%)	3	0
Jain	0	(0%)	0	0
Other Religion	0	(0%)	0	0
No Religion Specified	10	(0.12%)	3	7

== Languages ==
Linguistic composition of the population
1. Dogri (98.0%)
2. Gojari (0.79%)
3. Punjabi (1.10%)
4. Other languages (0.45%)

== Hiranagar Fort ==
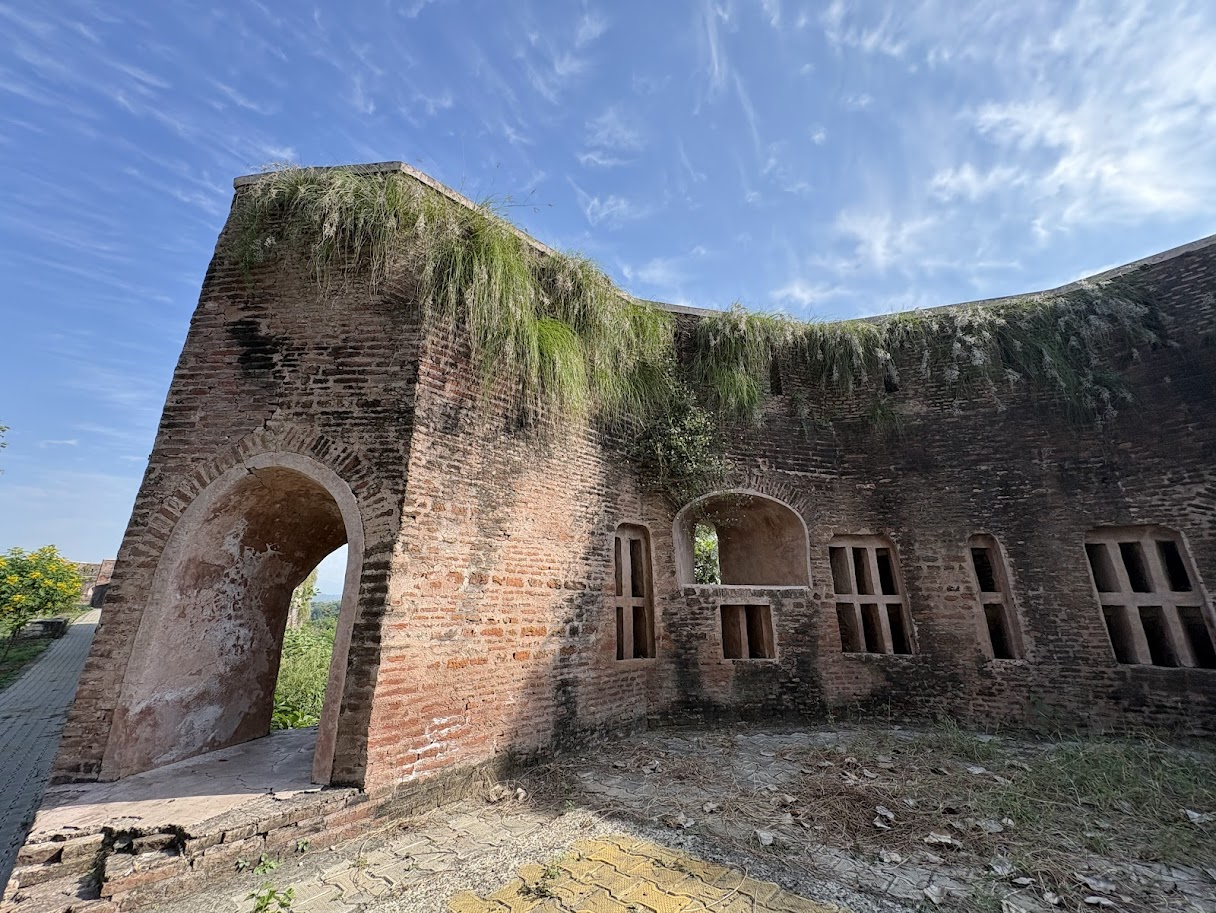
Remains of the Hiranagar Fort, showcasing its arched brick architecture and partially overgrown ramparts.

Hiranagar Fort is situated just outside the town. Towards the border with Pakistan. It was built by King Hira, after whom the town is named. It has a notable temple of Mata Kali. It is one of the historical places in Kathua District.

== Rail and road connectivity ==
The town of Hiranagar is connected to major cities like- Jammu, Srinagar, New Delhi, etc.. via Srinagar-Kanyakumari Highway(NH-44). Hiranagar has a railway station through which it is connected to other cities with rail connectivity.
