= Kathua district =

- District of Jammu and Kashmir administered by India
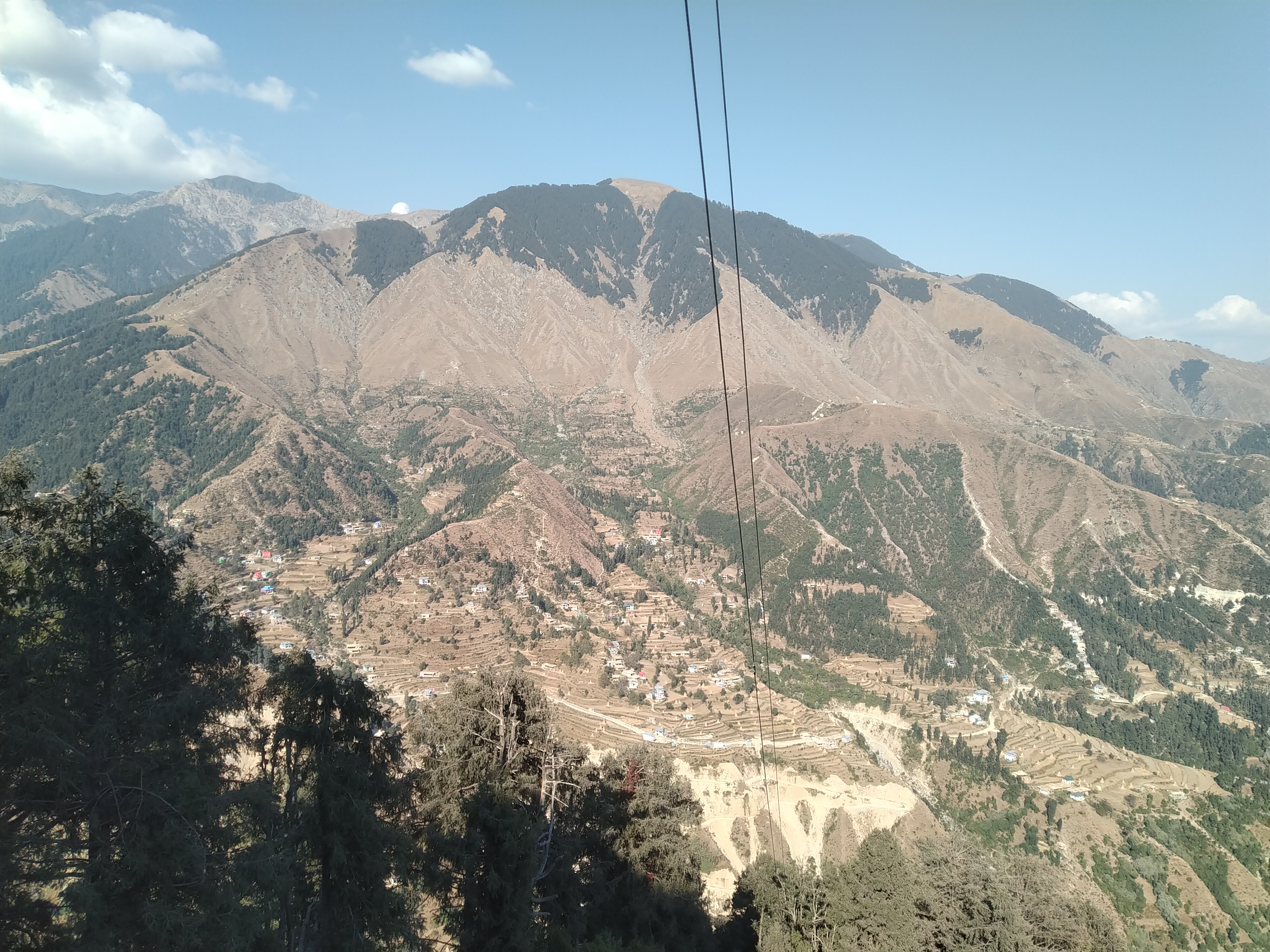
- Mountainous areas in the east of Kathua

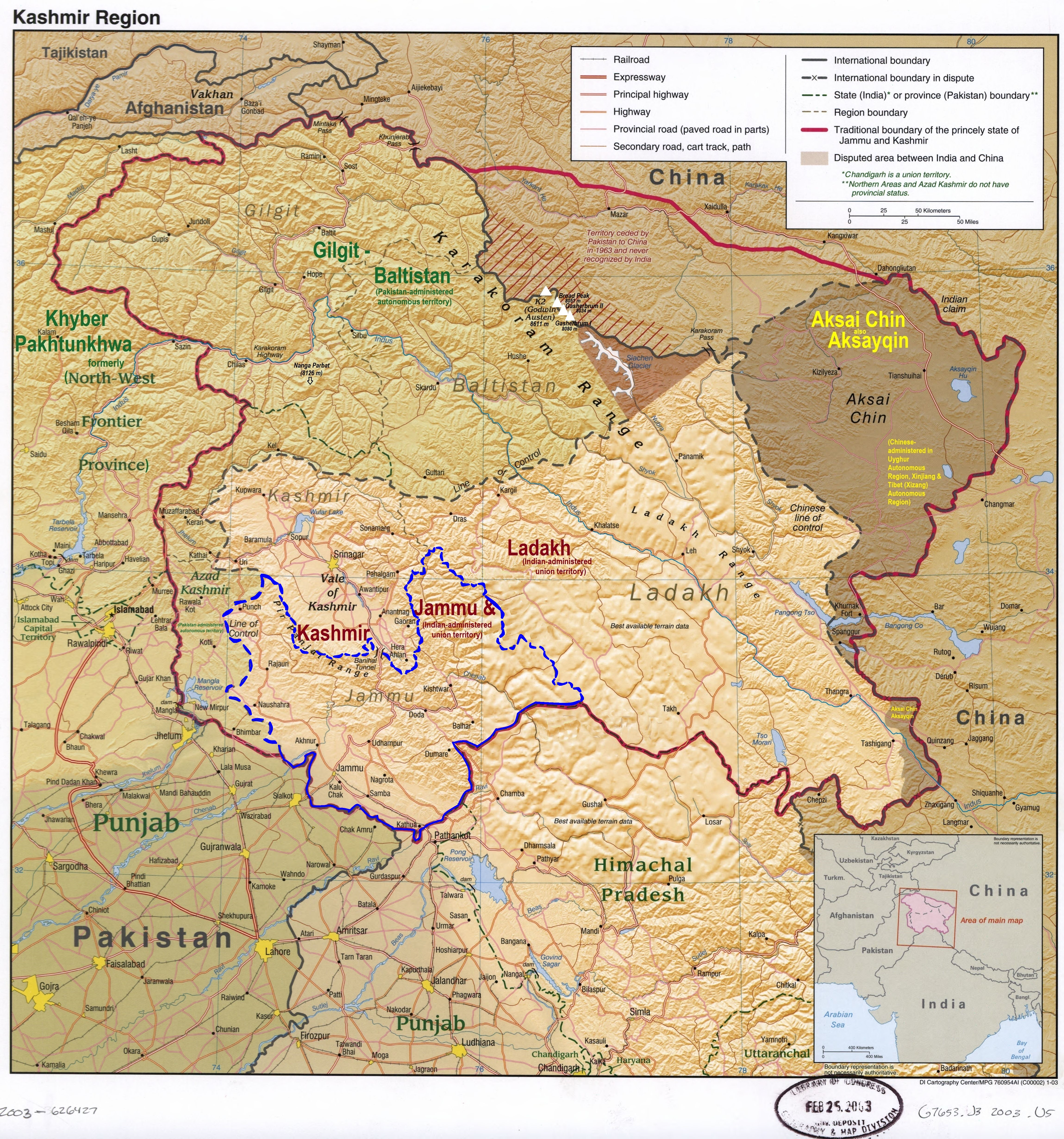
- Kathua district is in the Jammu division (shown with neon blue boundary) of Indian-administered Jammu and Kashmir (shaded in tan in the disputed Kashmir region
- Interactive map of Kathua district
- Coordinates (Kathua): 32°35′N 75°30′E
- Administering country: India
- Union territory: Jammu and Kashmir
- Division: Jammu
- Parliamentary Constituency: Udhampur-Doda-Kathua Constituency
- District Headquarter: Kathua
- Tehsils: Bani, Basholi, Billawar, Hiranagar, Kathua, Barnoti, Ghagwal, Duggan, Lohai Malhar, Najot, Nagri, Marheen, Mahanpur, Lohai Malhar, Ramkote, Dinga Amb.

Government
  - District Development Council Chairperson: Mann Singh (BJP)
  - District Collector: Rakesh Minhas (IAS)

Area
  - Total: 2,502 km^{2} (966 sq mi)
  - Urban: 43.16 km^{2} (16.66 sq mi)
  - Rural: 2,458.84 km^{2} (949.36 sq mi)

Population (2011)
  - Total: 616,435
  - Density: 246.4/km^{2} (638.1/sq mi)
  - Urban: 89,713
  - Rural: 526,722

Demographics
  - Literacy: 73.09%
  - Sex ratio: 890
- Time zone: UTC+05:30 (IST)
- Vehicle registration: JK-08
- Major highways: NH 44(Pathankot-Jammu), Bhaderwah-Basoli Highway, Border Road(Kathua-Bishnah).
- Average annual precipitation: 921cm ( Annual-Billawar) mm
- Website: https://kathua.nic.in/

Kathua district is an administrative district in the Jammu division of Indian-administered Jammu and Kashmir in the disputed Kashmir region. It is surrounded by Jammu to the northwest, Doda and Udhampur districts to the north, the Indian state of Himachal Pradesh to the east and Punjab to the south. Pakistan's working boundary is to the west.

Kathua district is divided into 8 blocks: Bani, Barnoti, Basholi, Billawar, Najot, Duggan, Ghagwal, Hiranagar, Kathua and Lohai Malhar. It has approximately 512 villages.

The traditional language of Kathua is Dogri with some Pahari influence. Pahari languages are prevalent in the mountainous area of the east. The principal media of education are English, Hindi, and Urdu.

== History ==
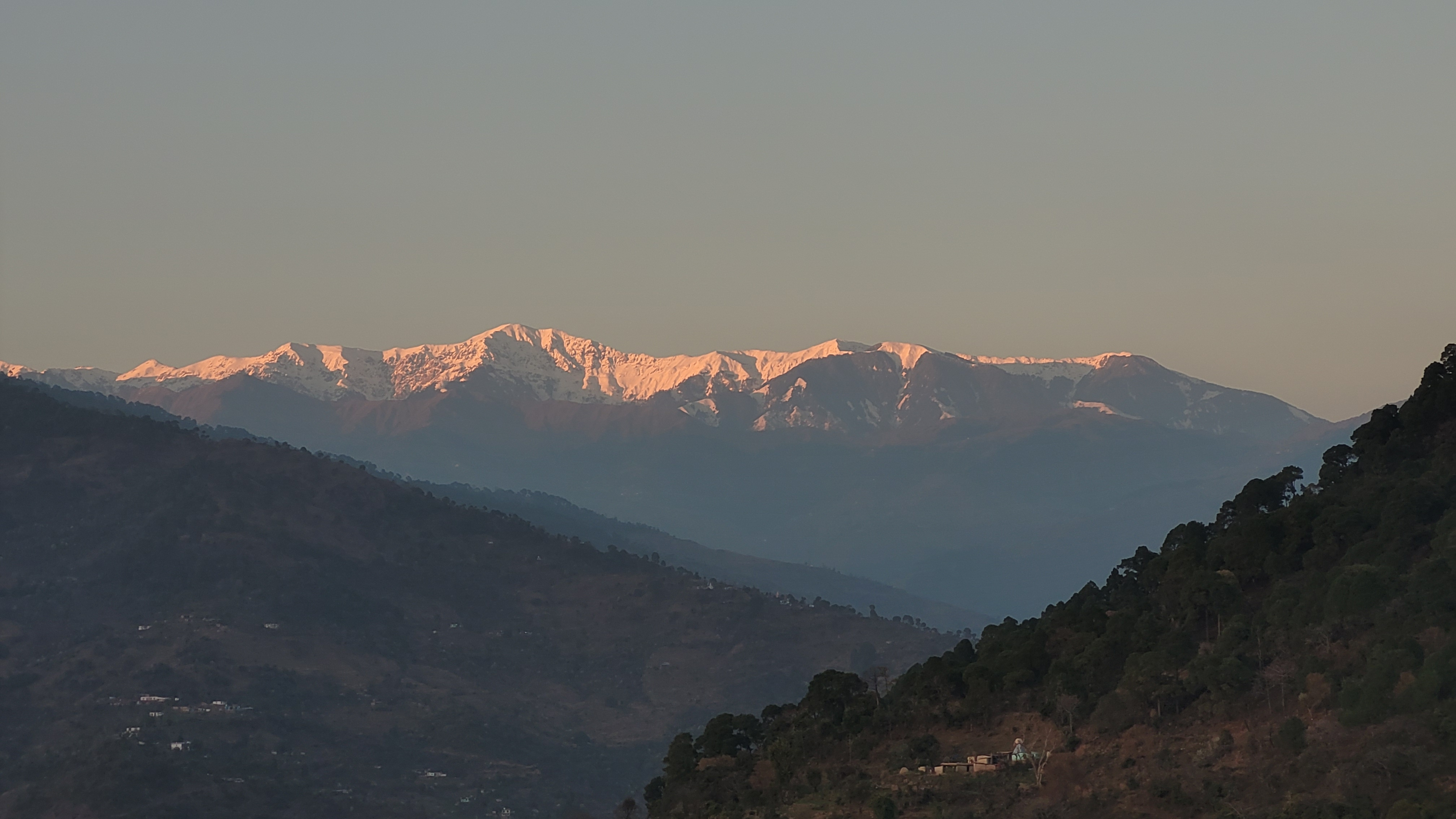
Nuknali (3820m) is one of the highest peaks in Kathua district

Kathua district in J & K

Jodh Singh of the Andotra clan (shares ancestry with Tomar and Som Rajputs) is believed to have migrated from Hastinapur to Kathua nearly 2,000 years ago.

His three sons established the three Hamlets of Taraf Tajwal, Taraf Manjali and Taraf Bhajwal. Their descendants are now called as Tajwalia, Bhajwalia and Khanwalia Rajputs of Andotra sub-caste. Prior to 1921, the Kathua district was known as the Jasrota district. Between 1921–1931, the headquarters of the district was shifted to Kathua without any alteration in the area of governance.

Greek historians, who provide an insight into the ancient history of Jammu hills, prominently record the existence in this area of two powerful empires - Abhisara (present day Poonch) and Kathaioi - at the time of invasion of India by Alexander. Strabo describes Kathaioi as a mighty republic of that era, located in the foothills along the Ravi River. The topography of Kathaioi corresponds with the present day Kathua. Strabo describes the people of this republic as the epitome of bravery and courage, and records that they gave a tough fight to invading army of Alexander.

There are many places which commemorate a visit to Kathua by Pandavas. Lord Krishna is also said to have come to this area, in order to get back from Jamawant the Syamantaka Mani.

In January 1846 Captain James Abbott, who was demarcating the Punjab-Kashmir boundary after the First Anglo-Sikh War, noted in his journal "I have enclosed Katooha [sic] within the Jummoo territory, to be balanced by lands taken from the Jummoo frontier. This arrangement gives a better boundary to both States, and the Maharaja Goolab Singh had expressed his particular wish to effect it and readiness to give an equivalent in land.

Because of its close proximity to the Pakistan border, Kathua District has had a significant Indian Army presence since independence. The Army units were camped at Kathua during militancy in the state when the ultras (extremists) carried out attacks against government installations. Some of these ultras were Lashkar-e-Taiba (LeT) and infiltration across the border from Pakistan was a major concern. There were many attacks in the region beginning in the late 1980s. Among them, in March 2002, ten people were killed in an attack in Kathua at a temple, in May thirty-two people were killed in an attack on a bus and Army residential complex, in July twenty-nine people were killed in an attack near Qasim Nagar, in September twelve people were killed when ultras attacked a bus at Hiranagar Morh. In 2005, three terrorists attacked on army camp in front of District Hospital in Kathua killing two people. By 2008 the attacks had ceased. But in 2013, ultras attacked a police station, killing four policemen and a civilian, stole a truck and then attacked an army camp in the neighbouring Samba District.

== Basohli Paintings ==
Basohli, a town of Kathua district, is widely known for its paintings. Immortalised by their artistic eminences and their connoisseur patrons, Basohli today is a metaphor for a vigorous, bold and imaginative artistic style, rich, stylish and unconventional.

A style of painting characterised by vigorous use of primary colours and a peculiar facial formula prevailed in the seventeenth and early eighteenth centuries in the foothills of the Western Himalayas in the Jammu and Punjab States.

The earliest paintings in this style originated in Basohli from where the style spread to the Hill States of Mankot, Nurpur, Kulu, Mandi, Suket, Bilaspur, Nalagarh, Chamba, Guler and Kangra. The first mention of Basohli painting is in the annual report of the Archaeological Survey of India published in 1921.

== Politics ==
Kathua District has six assembly constituencies: Bani, Basohli, Kathua, Billawar, Jasrota and Hiranagar (S.C).

== Demographics ==
Historical populations
Year	Pop.	±%
1901	144,722	—
1911	142,404	−1.6%
1921	144,675	+1.6%
1931	151,394	+4.6%
1941	166,940	+10.3%
1951	180,968	+8.4%
1961	194,997	+7.8%
1971	256,755	+31.7%
1981	340,494	+32.6%
1991	419,120	+23.1%
2001	511,455	+22.0%
2011	616,435	+20.5%
source: † 1951 and 1991 populations are estimated

Religion in Kathua district (2011)
Religion	Percent
Hinduism	87.61%
Islam	10.42%
Sikhism	1.55%
Other or not stated	0.42%

Sex Ratio in Kathua District in 2011 Census. (no. females per 1,000 males)
Religion (and population)	Sex Ratio
Hindu (pop 540,063)	890
Muslim (pop 64,234)	904
Sikh (pop 9,551)	809
Other (pop 2,587)	873
Total (pop 616,435)	890

Languages of Kathua district (2011)
1. Dogri (81.9%)
2. Pahadi (6.94%)
3. Gojri (3.50%)
4. Kashmiri (2.01%)
5. Punjabi (1.86%)
6. Hindi (1.03%)
7. Others (2.74%)

According to the 2011 census Kathua district has a population of 616,435, roughly equal to the nation of Solomon Islands or the US state of Vermont. This gives it a ranking of 521st in India (out of a total of 640). The district has a population density of 246 inhabitants per square kilometre (640/sq mi) . Its population growth rate over the decade 2001-2011 was 20.53%. Kathua has a sex ratio of 890 females for every 1000 males, and a literacy rate of 73.09%. 14.55% of the population lives in urban areas. The Scheduled Castes and Scheduled Tribes account for 22.91% and 8.65% of the population of the district.

Kathua district: religion, gender ratio, and % urban of population, according to the 2011 Census.
	Hindu	Muslim	Christian	Sikh	Buddhist	Jain	Other	Not stated	Total
Total	540,063	64,234	1,828	9,551	24	16	2	717	616,435
Total	87.61%	10.42%	0.30%	1.55%	0.00%	0.00%	0.00%	0.12%	100.00%
Male	285,720	33,728	941	5,280	12	9	1	418	326,109
Female	254,343	30,506	887	4,271	12	7	1	299	290,326
Gender ratio (% female)	47.1%	47.5%	48.5%	44.7%	50.0%	43.8%	50.0%	41.7%	47.1%
Sex ratio (no. of females per 1,000 males)	890	904	943	809	–	–	–	715	890
Urban	82,162	3,272	1,111	3,015	13	6	1	133	89,713
Rural	457,901	60,962	717	6,536	11	10	1	584	526,722
% Urban	15.2%	5.1%	60.8%	31.6%	54.2%	37.5%	50.0%	18.5%	14.6%

At the time of the 2011 census, 81.92% of the population spoke Dogri, 6.94% Pahari, 3.50% Gojri, 2.01% Kashmiri, 1.86% Punjabi and 1.03% Hindi as their first language.

== Places of interest ==
Kathua district is known for its scenery and numerous Hindu pilgrimage sites like Sukrala Mata Mandir, Chanchlo Mata Mandir, Jourian wali Mata, Bala Sundari Mandir and Airwan Mandir. Bani valley, Chhatergala meadow, Sarthal meadow, Dhaggar site are some of scenic spots in this district.
