= Simblna =

- Village
- Location in Jammu and Kashmir, India Simblna (India)
- Coordinates: 32°36′20″N 75°12′41″E
- Country: India
- Union Territory: Jammu and Kashmir
- District: Samba
- Founder: Sarmal Rajputs

Languages
  - Spoken: Dogri, English, Hindi, Urdu
- Time zone: UTC+5:30 (IST)
- PIN: 184121
- Vehicle registration: JK 21

Simblna is a village in Samba district of the union territory of Jammu and Kashmir. It is about 16 km northeast of the town of Samba.
