= Ramgarh =

Ramgarh may refer to:

== Bangladesh ==
- Ramgarh Upazila, a sub-district of Khagrachari District
  - Ramgarh, Khagrachhari, a town in Bangladesh.
  - Ramgarh Union, a union in Khagrachhari District

== India ==
- Ramgarh, Bihar, a village near Munger, Bihar
- Ramgarh, Kaimur, a town in Kaimur district, Bihar
  - Ramgarh, Bihar Assembly constituency
- Ramgarh, Uttarakhand, a hill station in Nainital district, Uttarakhand
- Ramgarh, Chhattisgarh, a village and ancient ruins in Ambikapur district, Chhattisgarh
- Ramgarh, Jalandhar, a village in Jalandhar district, Punjab
- Ramgarhia Bunga, tower in Amritsar, Punjab, India
  - Ramgarhia Misl, former Sikh confederacy in India
  - Ramgarhia, community of Sikhs in India
- Former name for the town Dindori, Madhya Pradesh
- Former name for Dindori district, Madhya Pradesh

=== Jammu and Kashmir ===
- Ramgarh tehsil, in which the village Chak Paras is located
  - Ramgarh, Jammu and Kashmir, a town and tehsil headquarters

=== Jharkhand ===
- Ramgarh district
  - Ramgarh subdivision
  - Ramgarh (community development block), a community development block
  - Ramgarh, Jharkhand Assembly constituency, an electoral constituency
  - Ramgarh Cantonment, a town and district headquarters
  - Ramgarh Coalfield, a coalfield
- Ramgarh, Dumka, a community development block in Dumka district
  - Ramgarh, Dumka (village), a village in Dumka district
- Ramgarh Raj, a major estate in the era of the British Raj

=== Rajasthan ===
- Ramgarh, Alwar, in Alwar district
  - Ramgarh, Rajasthan Assembly constituency
- Ramgarh, Dantaramgarh, a town in Dantaramgarh tehsil of Sikar district
- Jamwa Ramgarh, a subdivision of the Jaipur district
- Ramgarh, Hanumangarh, a village in Hanumangarh district
- Ramgarh, Sikar, a city and municipality in Fathepur tehsil of Sikar district
- Ramgarh crater, a meteor crater near village Ramgarh in Baron district
- Ramgarh Lake, an artificial lake situated near Jaipur city

== Pakistan ==
- Ramgarh, Lahore, a neighbourhood in Punjab

== Fictional places ==
- Ramgarh, a village in the 1975 Indian film Sholay and its remake Ramgarh Ke Sholay (1991)

== See also ==
- Ramgarha, Bhopal, a village in Madhya Pradesh, India
- Ram (disambiguation)
- Garhi (disambiguation)
