= Nathuakhan =

- village
- Location in Uttarakhand, India Nathuakhan (India)
- Coordinates: 29.475°N 79.605°E
- Country: India
- State: Uttarakhand
- District: Nainital
- Elevation: 1,940 m (6,360 ft)

Languages
  - Official: Hindi
- Time zone: UTC+5:30 (IST)
- PIN: 263158
- Vehicle registration: UK
- Website: uk.gov.in

Nathuakhan is a village in the Ramgarh block of the Nainital district in the state of Uttarakhand and a popular tourist destination. It is situated at a height of 1940 meters, in the heart of Kumaon Mountains of the central Himalayas, close to the towns of Mukteshwar and Nainital (45 km). Also close by are places like Hartola and Ramgarh, all accessible from Nainital and Bhimtal.

== Geography ==
The village is divided into 12 hamlets which are as follows:

- Tallatanda
- Navada
- Mallatanda
- Gaon
- Kafaldhari
- Kanala
- Jhopro
- Banola
- Bunga
- Bageecha
- Lamakhan
- Tapuk

== Education ==
Some schools in and around Nathuakhan are:

- Shri Dhan Singh Negi Government Inter-College - Peora
- Shri Shiv Narayan Singh Negi Government Inter-College - Nathuakhan
- Government Higher Secondary School - Reetha
- Government Higher Secondary School - Devdwar

== Religion ==
Some of the temples in and around Nathuakhan are:

- Devdwareshwar Mahadev temple - Devdwar
- Ram mandir and Hanuman mandir - Nathuakhan
- Devi Temple - Delkuna
- Gangnath - Delkuna
- Bhumijyu temple - Delkuna
- Devi Temple - Nathuwakhan
