= Chak Paras =

Coordinates: 32°29′N 74°58′E

- Village
- Interactive map of Chak Paras
- Country: India
- State: Jammu and Kashmir
- District: Samba
- Tehsil: Ramgarh
- Languages: Hindi, Dogri

Population (2011)
  - Total: 687 (342 men 345 women)
- Time zone: UTC+5:30 (IST)
- Postal code: 181141
- Vehicle registration: JK21

Chak Paras or Chack Paras is a village, just 26 km from Samba town in the Samba district of Jammu and Kashmir, India, near the India-Pakistan border. Chak Paras is situated 3 km from Ramgarh.

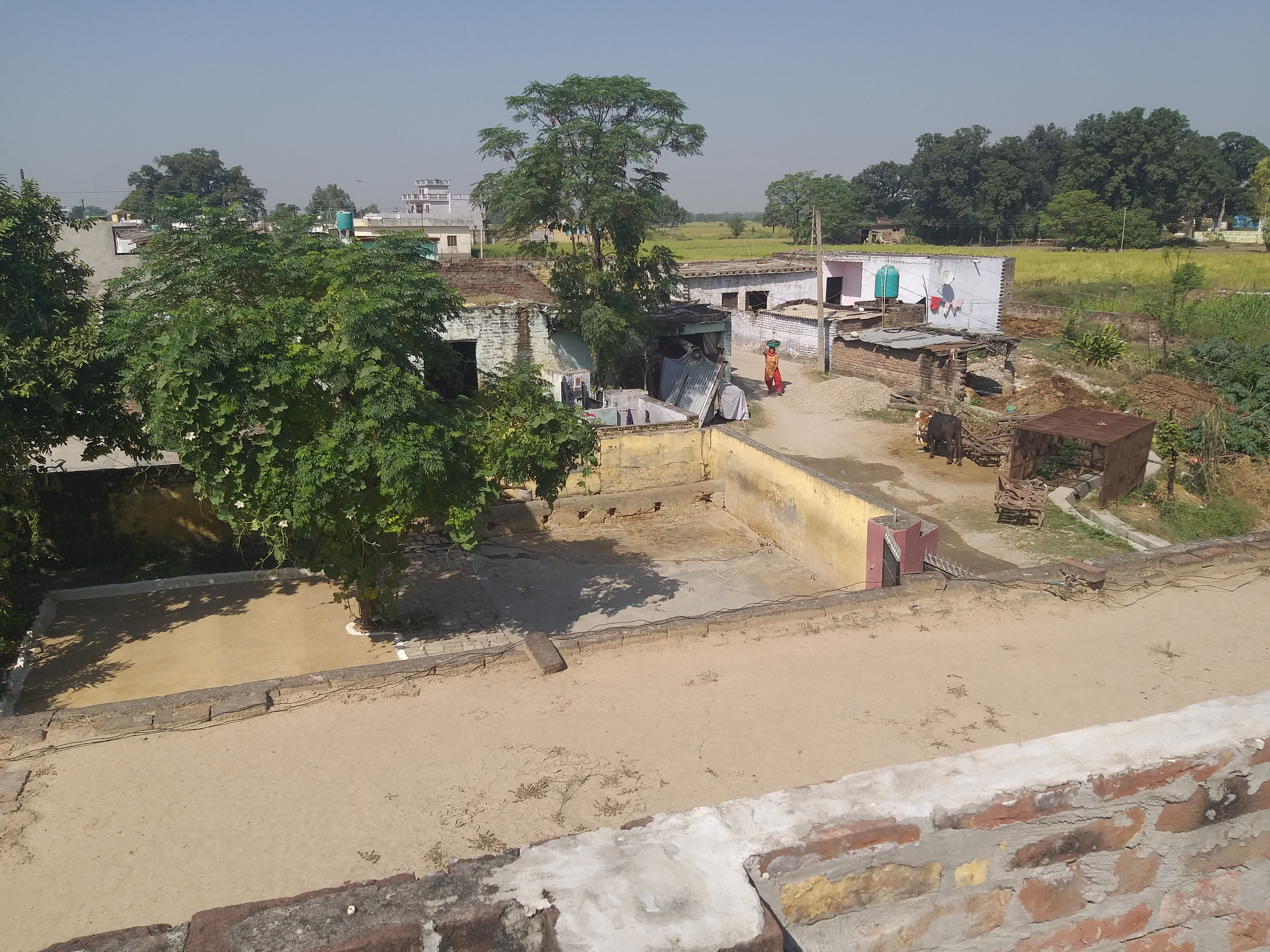
Chak Paras in Samba district, J&K

Chack Paras village included one more village jointly Patwaar named Govindgarh. Govindgarh officially come under Chak Paras village documentation as per revenue department's records. The village Chak Paras has 35 houses, 07 public water wells, 01 Custodian Mango farm, a primary school, a mosque, a Hindu temple and a cemetery. Total number of families who come under this village are 59 as per the Lambardar of village. 38 families are residing in village and 21 families are residing outside village. Most of families of this village are Refugee of 1947 Partition of India, Indo-Pakistani War of 1965, Indo-Pakistani War of 1971 . The main occupation of the villagers is agriculture. Some youths are in Indian Army, BSF and Indian Police while others in Merchant Navy. Main agricultural production of this village is rice, wheat, vegetables and mustard seed. Total agricultural land under this village is approximately 146.9 hectares and residential area is 48 kanals.
