= Hartola =

Hartola may refer to:

- Hartola (Finland), a municipality in Finland
- Hartola, Uttarakhand, a small village in India
