= Lakshman Singh Charak =

Indian politician

Member of parliament, Lok Sabha
- In office 1952–1957

Personal details
- Born: 12 May 1912 (age 114) Birpur, Tehsil Samba, Jammu District
- Party: National Conference
- Children: Dr. Posh Charak (former professor, Department of English, University of Jammu and Ex member JKPSC)
- Education: P.W. College & University of California
- Occupation: Politician
- Profession: Farmer

Lakshman Singh Charak was a nominated Member of Parliament of the 1st Lok Sabha of India.
