= Baba Shivo =

Indian folk deity

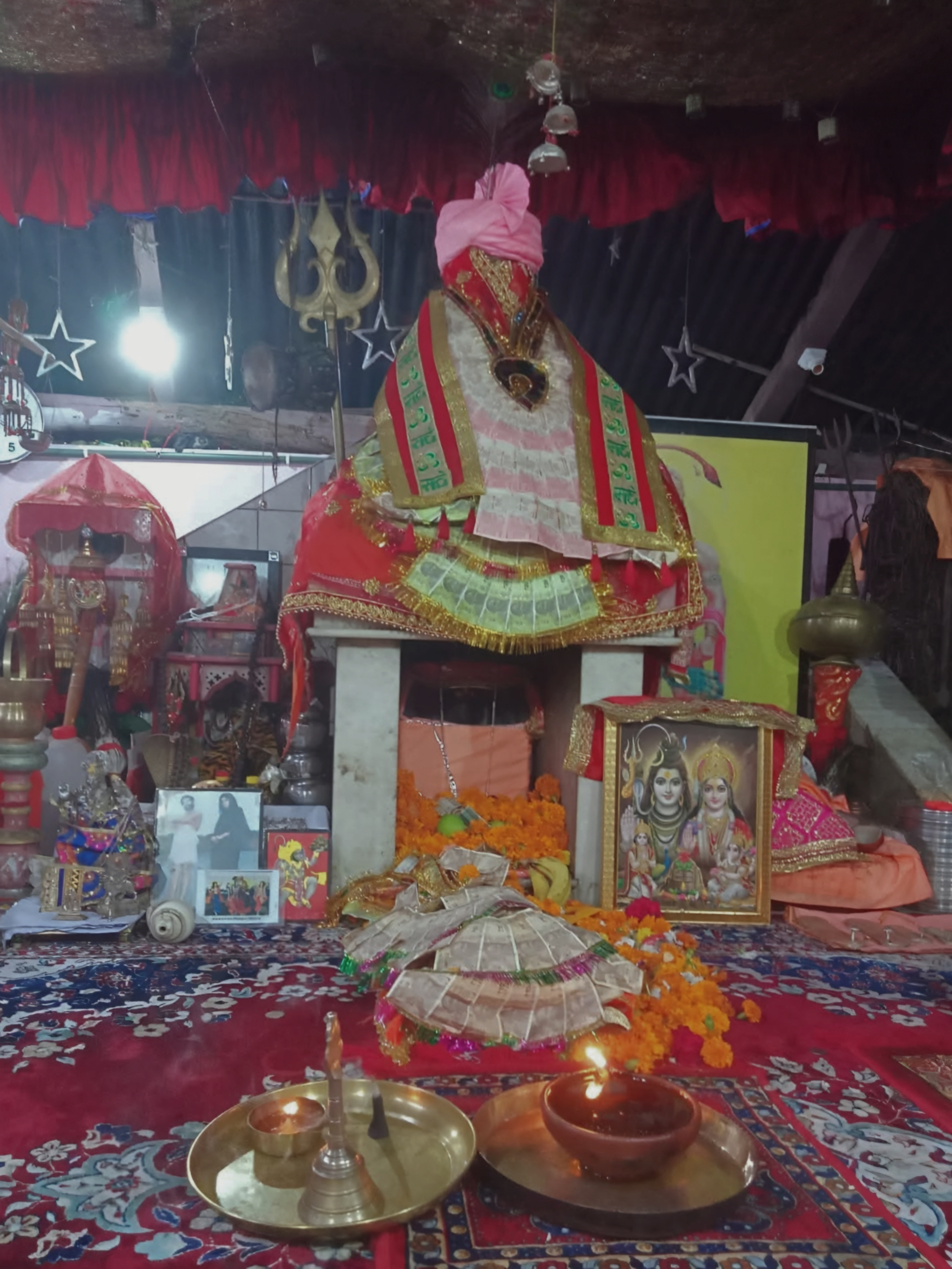
- The worshiping image of Baba Shivoji
- Other names: Goran Baba
- Major cult center: Jammu, Himachal Pradesh, Punjab Region
- Abode: Goran, Samba, Jammu and Kashmir, India
- Region: Rajasthan, Gujarat, Jammu and Punjab Region

Genealogy
- Born: Samotha, present in Samba district of Jammu and Kashmir, India.
- Parents: Raja Ladh Dev (Father); Rani Kalavati (Mother)

Baba Shivo (also known as Goran Baba, c. 13th–14th century) is a Hindu folk deity worshipped in Jammu and Kashmir and Himachal Pradesh. He is regarded as a warrior-hero and is venerated as an avatar of Rudra Ansh. He is referenced in the folklore of Jammu. Little historical information is available about him, other than that he was the son of Raja Ladh Dev (also known as Raja Ladhha) and Queen Kalavati (also known as Rani Kalli).

== Kingdom ==
Baba Shivoji's father was King of Pattan. Pattan is one of the historical capitals of Kashmir, nearly in the centre of the valley. Pattan tehsil hosts the remains of four palaces including two within the municipal limits. Rajatarangini states that the king of Kashmir Shankaravarmma built a town named Pattana.

== Legend ==
According to legend, Shivo was born with the blessings of Guru Gorakhnath, who blessed his parents Raja Ladh Dev and Rani Kalli to have a child like Lord Shiva, whose name was conferred on the child.

=== Early life ===
King Ladh dev had no child, until he showed his kundali to his kulguru, who told him that he could have only one thing in his destiny: either the kingdom or a child. Then on the recommendation of yogis, it was suggested that if he wanted a son then he must leave his kingdom and adopt austerity (tapasya) and pray to Gorakhnath for the child. After handing over the throne to his younger brother, both king and queen left for Sauram hills. After worshipping there for years, they moved towards Samotha, where they prayed to Gorakhnath for twelve years. Gorakhnath blessed them, saying that a son would be born to them who would be the incarnation of Rudra, and he should be named Shiv Dev (Shivo). After nine months, Shivo was born to them in the holy land of Samotha.

=== Other ===
When he grew up, he decided to work for the king of Jammu Raja Mal Dev in his palace. According to folklore, a lion came to the region and began to kill the public's animals; Raja announced that he would give a prize to a person who killed the lion. One day when Shivo was going towards Jammu, he saw the lion and killed it with his sword, then cut off its ears and put it under one of the palace's pillars. Due to this, the king realised that he was a godly man and touched his feet and Shivo gave spiritual gyaan to him.

Shivo played a musical instrument, the dotara. In the area surrounding Samotha, in the hills of Goran, lived Kharadkhatri Rajputs. When Shivo played the dotara, the women of Kharadkhatris came out of their homes to listen to the music. Kharadkhatri found his playing to be an insane act and conspired to kill Shivo while he was busy playing the dotara. They cut off the head of Baba, which remained there; his body travelled to the Goran where Babaji's temple was later constructed. Most of the Kharadkhatris were said to have been killed by the curse of Babaji, while others left the area and changed their Gots. It is said that the Baba Goran fulfills the wishes of devotees who pray with true heart and strong determination. Many people ask for wishes to the Baba and then offer bhandara (charity kitchen) at the temple after the wish is fulfilled. Goat sacrifices are also given there in the name of Babaji. Baba Shivo (Goran Baba) is the Kuldev of Sarmal Clan of the Suryavanshi Dogra Rajputs. Devotees from Hindu and Muslim communities throng the shrine mainly on Sunday and Tuesday.

== Festivals ==
Every year, a wrestling match is held in the name of Baba Shivo at the shrine. The Baba Shivo Chhadi pilgrimage (yatra) also takes place from Samotha to Goran.
