= Gorah Salathian =

Gurha Slathia Gurha Slathia
- Village
- Location in Jammu and Kashmir, India Gurha Slathia (India)
- Coordinates: 32.62625°N 75.0047°E
- Country: India
- State: Jammu and Kashmir
- District: Jammu

Population (2011)
  - Total: 4,629

Languages
  - Official: Dogri
- Time zone: UTC+5:30 (IST)
- 181143: 181143

Gurha Slathia is a village and notified area in the Samba district of the Indian union territory of Jammu and Kashmir.

== Demographics ==
Gurha Slathia is the only village in Jammu and Kashmir with a population exceeding 4,600 (4,629 according to a census in 2011). In 1975, 90% of the families living there had at least one member serving in the Indian Army.

== History ==
Slathia's Raja Hamir Dev ruled the Jammu kingdom between Bikarmi from 1400 to 1423. He had two popular sons: Ajaib Dev and Hasil Dev. The younger son, Hasil Dev, became the Wazir of Raja Ajaib Dev of Jammu kingdom. Raja Ajaib Dev died in Bikarmi in 1454. Wazir Hasil Dev cared for the young prince Beeram Dev and helped him with his administrative duties.

=== The Badshah of Delhi Legend ===
According to local legend, Badshah of Delhi, who belonged to the Lodhi or Sadat dynasty, found Beeram Dev charming. Badshah arranged for Beeram Dev to marry his daughter, who had fallen in love at first sight with the prince. He ordered Raja Beeram Dev to convert and commit himself to Islam before the marriage, but the Raja refused to change his religion. However, Beeram Dev still wished to marry Badshah's daughter. The Badshah became furious at Raja Beeram Dev's refusal to change his religion.

After Badshah conferred with the Qadi, he ordered Raja Beeram Dev's killing. Wazir Hasil Dev came to Raja Beeram Dev's rescue and asked the Badshah to hand the Beeram Dev to him in order to convince him to convert to Islam and marriage to Badshah's daughter. After playing his hand, Hasil Dev sent Raja Beeram Dev back to Jammu in the night along with a few sepoys. Badshah caught hold of Wazir Hasil Dev and scalped him alive. Then Badshah sent his forces to capture Raja Beeram Dev, who was also later killed by Badshah's troops. Laterally, Maharaja Gulab Singh allotted Jagirs in Kashmir to the Manglia Rajputs.
