= Samba railway station =

Railway station in Jammu and Kashmir, India

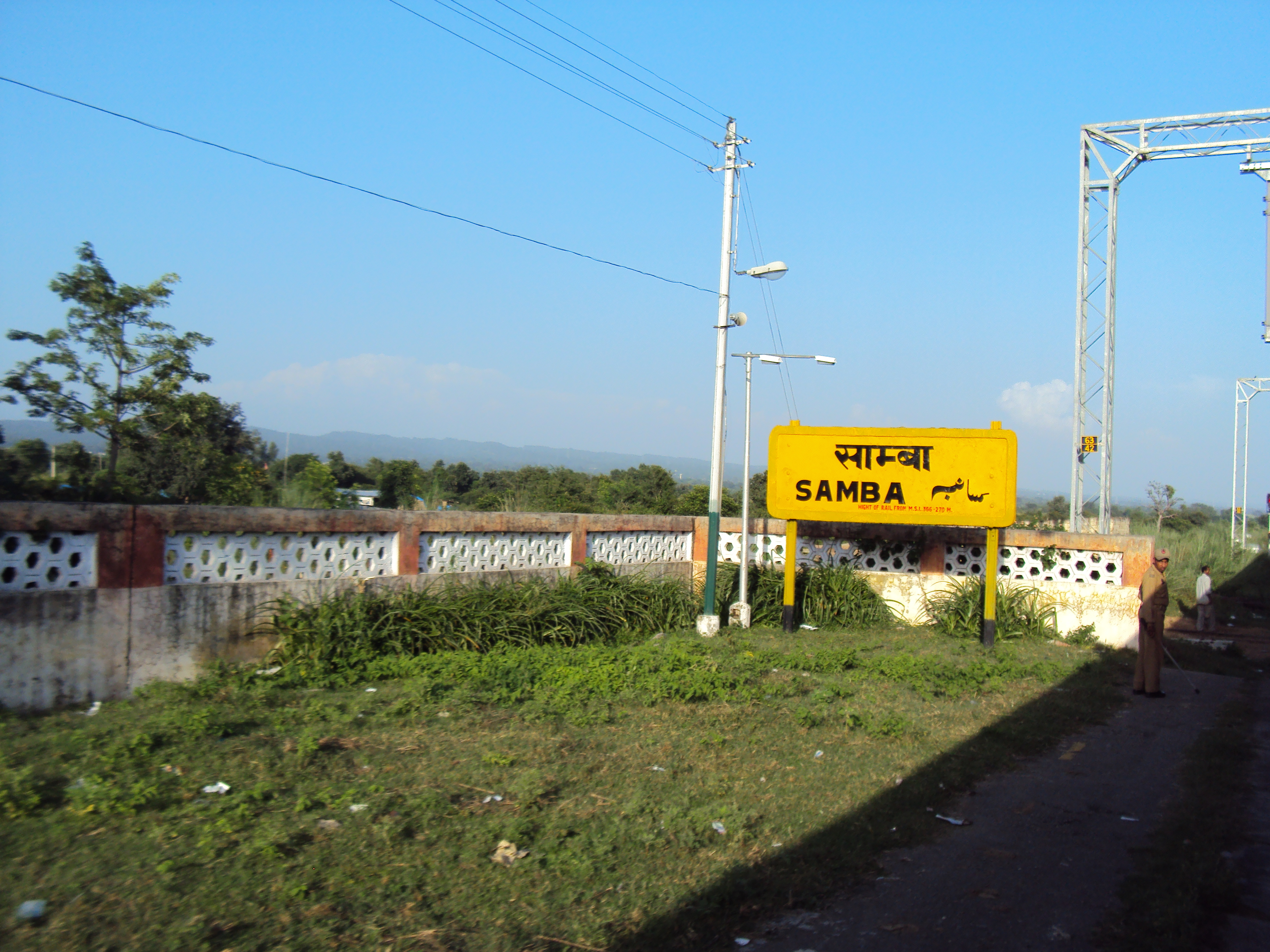
- Samba Railway station

General information
- Location: Samba, Jammu and Kashmir (India)
- Elevation: 365 metres (1,198 ft)
- System: Indian Railways station
- Owner: Indian Railways
- Operator: Northern Railway
- Line: Jammu–Baramulla line
- Platforms: 2
- Tracks: 4

Construction
- Structure type: Standard (on-ground station)
- Parking: Yes
- Cycle facilities: No

Other information
- Status: opened
- Station code: SMBX
- Zone(s): Northern Railway
- Division(s): Jammu
Location

Samba Railway Station is a small railway station in Samba district, Jammu and Kashmir, India. Its code is SMBX. It serves Samba town. The station consists of 2 platforms.

== Electrification ==
The entire Jalandhar–Jammu section, Jammu Tawi station and sidings have been completely energised at 25 kV AC and approved for electric traction in August 2014. Swaraj Express now gets an end to end WAP-4 from Jammu Tawi to Bandra Terminus. Himgiri Express now gets an end to end WAP-7 from Jammu Tawi to Howrah.
