= Hartola, Uttarakhand =

Village in Uttarakhand, India

Hartola
- Village
- Location in Uttarakhand, India Hartola (India)
- Coordinates: 29°28′41″N 79°03′05″E
- Country: India
- State: Uttarakhand
- District: Nainital
- Sub-district: Nainital
- Community development block: Ramgarh

Government
  - Type: Gram panchayat
  - Body: Hartola Gram Panchayat

Area
  - Total: 165.83 ha (409.8 acres)
- Elevation: 2,181 m (7,156 ft)

Population (2011)
  - Total: 668

Languages
  - Official: Hindi
- Time zone: UTC+5:30 (IST)
- PIN: 263158
- Vehicle registration: UK
- Census village code: 054726

Hartola is a village and gram panchayat in the Nainital district in the Indian state of Uttarakhand. The village is associated with the Ramgarh community development block in the Kumaon division of state. The village has a population of about 670.

The village is located in the hill region of northern Nainital district, adjoining Mukteshwar forest reserve, consisting of forested hills and fruit-growing areas. The area is known for its orchards and its varieties of fruits like apples, plums, apricots, pears and peaches.

== Demographics ==
According to the 2011 census of India, Hartola had a population of 668 people in 130 households. The population comprised 355 males and 313 females. The village had 80 children in the 0–6 age group, 487 literate residents and 181 illiterate residents. The recorded geographical area of the village was 165.83 hectares.

== Tourism ==
It has emerged as a small-scale rural and nature-tourism destination within the Ramgarh–Mukteshwar region, known for village walks and visits to fruit orchards, the local Devi temple and excursions to Dhokaney waterfall, Kainchi Dham and Satpuri.

In 2019, a four-room homestay in Hartola received national media attention because more than 26,000 discarded plastic bottles were incorporated into its construction. Its builders said that the project was intended to draw attention to plastic waste and its disposal in the Himalayan region.

== Transport ==
Hartola is accessible by motor road through the Ramgarh region. A daily bus service formerly operated between Hartola and Nainital, departing Hartola in the morning and returning in the evening. In April 2026, residents of Hartola and adjoining villages petitioned for restoration of the service after it had been discontinued.

== See also ==
- Mukteshwar
- Ramgarh, Nainital
- Satkhol, Nainital
