= Chak Dayala =

Chack Dayala Chackdayala
- Town
- Location in Jammu and Kashmir, India Chack Dayala (India)
- Coordinates: 32.477622°N 75.307123°E
- Country: India
- Union Territory: Jammu and Kashmir
- District: Kathua
- Tehsil: Hiranagar

Population (2011)
  - Total: 943
- Time zone: UTC+5:30 (IST)

Chack Diyalla or Chakdyala is a village in the Indian union territory of Jammu and Kashmir. It is located in Hiranagar tehsil of Kathua district.

== Demography ==
According to 2011 census, Chack Dayala has total of 187 families residing with a population of 943 of which 495 were males while 448 were females. Average Sex Ratio of Chack Diyalla village is 905 which is higher than Jammu and Kashmir state average of 889. Literacy rate of the village was 86.08% higher than state literacy of 67.16%. Male literacy stands at 92.27% while female literacy was 79.45%.

Other general and backward caste (OBC) constitutes 91% of the total population of the village; there is no Schedule Tribe population.

== Transport ==
Chack Dayala is 5 km away from tehsil headquarter Hiranagar. While it is 64 km from winter capital Jammu city. Chak Dayala village has railway station.

== Religious worships ==
There is a temple in the town, Mata Vaishno Mandir Langerial (Shri Swami Vishno Puri JI Maharaj Mandir).
