= List of districts of Jammu and Kashmir =

Districts in Indian administration Jammu and Kashmir

Districts of Jammu and Kashmir

The Indian union territory of Jammu and Kashmir consists of two divisions: Jammu Division and Kashmir Division, and is further divided into 20 districts:

== History ==
=== Princely state of Jammu and Kashmir ===
Prior to 1947, Kashmir was a princely state under the paramountcy of the British Indian Empire. The central part of the princely state was administratively divided into the provinces Jammu and Kashmir. In addition there were frontier districts and semi-autonomous jagirs (principalities). They were subdivided as follows:

- Kashmir province: Districts of Srinagar, Anantnag, Baramulla and Muzaffarabad. (Muzzafarabad later became part of Azad Kashmir.)
- Internal jagirs: Poonch (half of it later became part of Azad Kashmir), Chenani and Bhaderwah
- Jammu province: Districts of Jammu, Udhampur and Mirpur (later became part of Azad Kashmir)
- Frontier districts:

- Ladakh district with three sub-districts: Leh, Kargil and Skardu (Skardu later became part of Gilgit-Baltistan.)
- Gilgit district with two sub-districts: Gilgit and Astore. (Both later became part of Gilgit-Baltistan.)
- Frontier ilaqas comprising Punial, Ishkoman, Yasin, Kuh Ghizar, Hunza, Nagar and Chilas. (All of these regions later became part of Gilgit-Baltistan.)

The Gilgit district and the frontier ilaqas were administered by the British administration as the Gilgit Agency, which were returned to the princely state prior to the Partition of India.

=== Partition ===
After the partition of India and subsequent independence of India and Pakistan, in October 1947, following a rebellion coupled with a tribal invasion from newly independent Pakistan, the Maharaja of Jammu and Kashmir acceded to India in return for armed assistance. India and Pakistan fought the First Kashmir War that lasted through 1948, at the end of which large parts of the three western districts of Mirpur, Poonch and Muzaffarabad, the whole of the Gilgit Agency and the Skardu sub-district of Ladakh came under Pakistani control. The remainder of the princely state had been organised as a state of India under the name Jammu and Kashmir.

=== Inside India ===
Districts of Jammu and Kashmir

District map of Jammu and Kashmir in 2025, also showing territories of the former Jammu and Kashmir controlled by other countries:
A. Muzaffarabad
B. Poonch (western portion)
C. Mirpur

The territory under Indian control include:

- Jammu Division: districts of Jammu, Kathua, Vijaypur, Bari Brahmana, Chak Dayala, Samba, Katra, Batote, Birpur, Doda, Batote, Lakhanpur, Udhampur, Reasi; the jagirs of Chenani and Bhaderwah; 11 per cent of the Mirpur district and 40 per cent of the Poonch jagir.
- Kashmir Division: Kashmir South (Anantnag) and Kashmir North (Baramulla); 13 per cent of the Muzaffarabad district.

The districts were reorganised by 1968, breaking up some of the larger districts. In 2006, eight new districts were created: Kishtwar, Ramban, Reasi, Samba, Bandipora, Ganderbal, Kulgam and Shopian.

In August 2019, the Jammu and Kashmir Reorganisation Act was passed by both houses of the Indian Parliament. The provisions contained in the bill reorganised the state of Jammu and Kashmir into two union territories; Jammu and Kashmir (union territory) and Ladakh with effect from 31 October 2019.

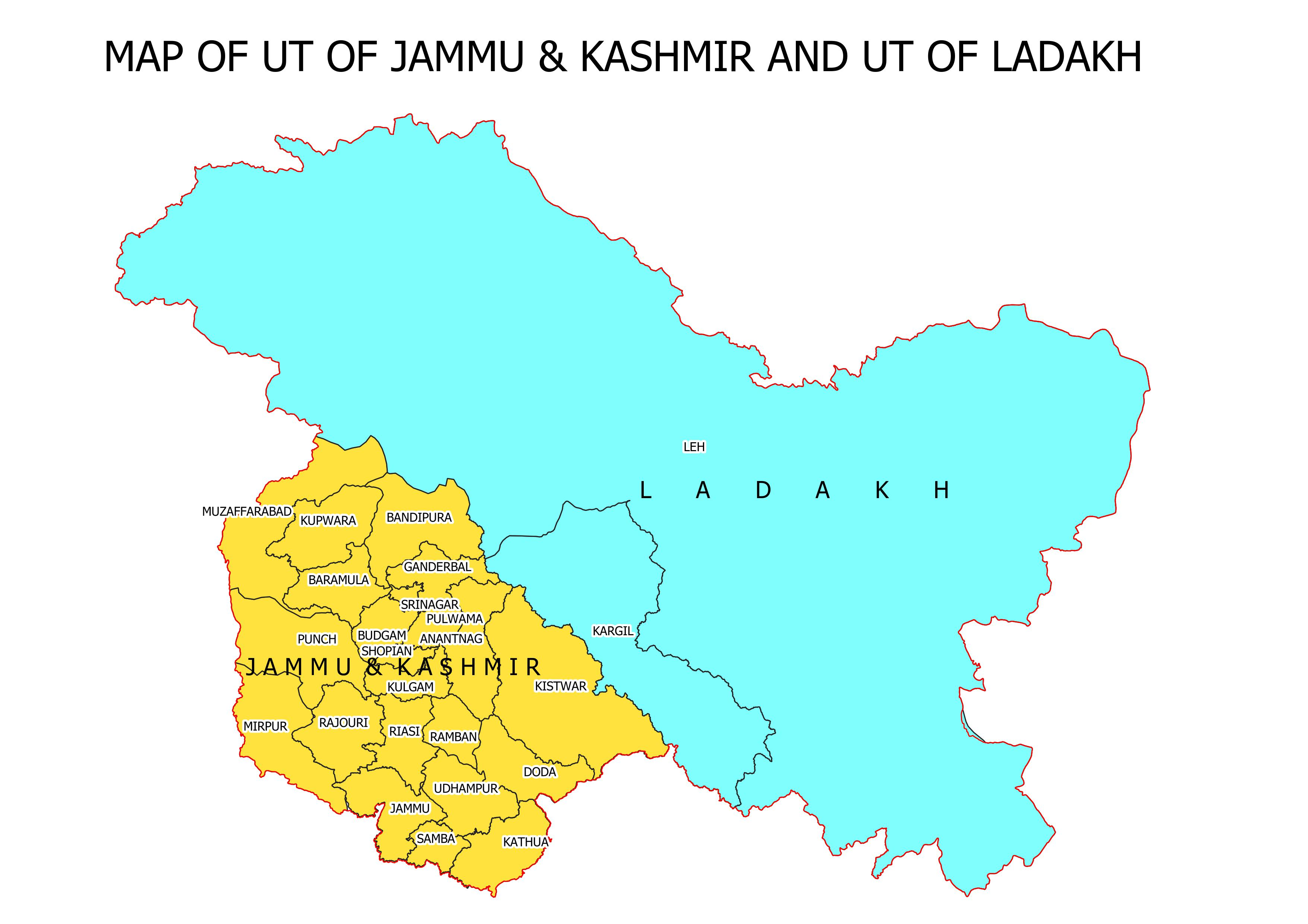
Districts of Jammu and Kashmir released by Government of India but 1.Muzaffarabad 2.Poonch (western portion) & 3.Mirpur are administered by Government of Pakistan

== Administration ==
The Deputy Commissioner (DC) is the head of the district administration. They are responsible for overall administration and development activities in the district. The DC functions as District Magistrate (DM) for maintenance of law and order and as Collector for revenue administration. In the capacity of Collector, the DC oversees revenue administration, managing tasks such as revenue collection, land records maintenance, and implementation of government fiscal policies. The DC is usually an Indian Administrative Service (IAS) officer. The Deputy commissioner is assisted by Additional Deputy Commissioners, Assistant Commissioners and Sub-divisional magistrates. The districts are further divided into sub-districts and tehsils.

== Districts ==
=== Jammu Division ===
Sl no.	District	Headquarters	Established	Subdivisions	Area	Population As of 2011	Population density	Map
1	Doda	Doda	1948	Assar; Thathri; Gandoh	2,625 km^{2} (1,014 sq mi)	409,576	156/km^{2} (400/sq mi)	
2	Jammu	Jammu	Before 1947	ACR Jammu; Jammu South; Jammu North; R.S. Pura; Marh; Akhnoor; Chowki Choura; Khour	2,342 km^{2} (904 sq mi)	1,526,406	652/km^{2} (1,690/sq mi)	
3	Kathua	Kathua	1963	Basholi; Bilawar/Badnota; Hiranagar; Bani	2,502 km^{2} (966 sq mi)	615,711	246/km^{2} (640/sq mi)	
4	Kishtwar	Kishtwar	2007	Chatroo; Marwah; Paddar	7,737 km^{2} (2,987 sq mi)	231,037	30/km^{2} (78/sq mi)	
5	Poonch	Poonch	1947	Mendhar; Surankote	1,674 km^{2} (646 sq mi)	476,820	285/km^{2} (740/sq mi)	
6	Rajouri	Rajouri	1967	Nowshera; Sunderbani; Kalakote; Kotranka; Thanamandi	2,630 km^{2} (1,020 sq mi)	619,266	235/km^{2} (610/sq mi)	
7	Ramban	Ramban	2007	Banihal; Ramsoo; Gool	1,329 km^{2} (513 sq mi)	283,313	213/km^{2} (550/sq mi)	
8	Reasi	Reasi	2007	Mahore; Dharmari; Katra	1,719 km^{2} (664 sq mi)	314,714	183/km^{2} (470/sq mi)	
9	Samba	Samba	2007	Vijaypur; Ghagwal	904 km^{2} (349 sq mi)	318,611	353/km^{2} (910/sq mi)	
10	Udhampur	Udhampur	1931	Dudu; Basantgarh; Chenani; Ramnagar	2,637 km^{2} (1,018 sq mi)	555,357	211/km^{2} (550/sq mi)	
—	Total	Jammu		37	26,293 km^{2} (10,152 sq mi)	5,350,811	204/km^{2} (530/sq mi)	

=== Kashmir Division ===
Sl no.	District	Headquarters	Established	Subdivisions	Area	Population As of 2011	Population density	Map
1	Anantnag	Anantnag	Before 1947	Bijbehara; Dooru; Kokernag; Pahalgam	3,574 km^{2} (1,380 sq mi)	1,070,144	299/km^{2} (770/sq mi)	
2	Bandipore	Bandipore	2007	Sonawari; Gurez	345 km^{2} (133 sq mi)	385,099	1,116/km^{2} (2,890/sq mi)	
3	Baramulla	Baramulla	Before 1947	Sopore; Uri; Pattan; Gulmarg	4,243 km^{2} (1,638 sq mi)	1,015,503	239/km^{2} (620/sq mi)	
4	Budgam	Budgam	1979	Beerwah; Chadoora; Khansahib	1,361 km^{2} (525 sq mi)	735,753	541/km^{2} (1,400/sq mi)	
5	Ganderbal	Ganderbal	2007	Kangan	1,045 km^{2} (403 sq mi)	297,003	284/km^{2} (740/sq mi)	
6	Kulgam	Kulgam	2007	D.H. Pora (Noorabad)	410 km^{2} (160 sq mi)	422,786	1,031/km^{2} (2,670/sq mi)	
7	Kupwara	Kupwara	1979	Karnah; Lolab	2,379 km^{2} (919 sq mi)	875,564	368/km^{2} (950/sq mi)	
8	Pulwama	Pulwama	1979	Tral	1,086 km^{2} (419 sq mi)	570,060	525/km^{2} (1,360/sq mi)	
9	Shopian	Shopian	2007	Zainapora	312 km^{2} (120 sq mi)	265,960	852/km^{2} (2,210/sq mi)	
10	Srinagar	Srinagar	Before 1947	Srinagar ACR; Srinagar East; Srinagar West	1,978.95 km^{2} (764.08 sq mi)	1,269,751	642/km^{2} (1,660/sq mi)	
—	Total	Srinagar		22	15,948 km^{2} (6,158 sq mi)	6,907,623	433/km^{2} (1,120/sq mi)	

== Demands for administrative reorganization ==
=== Statehood and Union Territory demands ===
There are active political and social movements proposing the carving out of new states and union territories from the current administrative boundaries of Jammu and Kashmir.

List of Proposed States and Union Territories
Proposed Status	Proposed Entity	Expected Area of Jurisdiction	Rationale for Creation
Statehood Demands
State	Jammu State	The entirety of the current Jammu Division.	Proposed by various regional political groups, such as IkkJutt Jammu, seeking separate statehood for the Jammu region to ensure regional political autonomy.
Union Territory Demands
Union Territory	Panun Kashmir	Designated areas within the Kashmir Valley.	Meaning "our own Kashmir," this is a proposed union territory intended to serve as a homeland for Kashmiri Hindus. The demand originated following the Exodus of Kashmiri Hindus in 1990.

=== Demands for new districts ===
Political representatives and local groups have frequently advocated for the creation of additional districts in the Jammu division, citing its significantly larger geographical area compared to the Kashmir division, despite both regions currently maintaining 10 districts each.

List of Proposed Districts Grouped by Current District
Proposed District	Proposed HQ	References
Proposed from Doda
Bhaderwah	Bhaderwah	
Thathri	Thathri	
Proposed from Kishtwar
Marwah	Marwah	
Proposed from Kathua
Billawar	Billawar	
Proposed from Jammu
Akhnoor	Akhnoor	
Proposed from Rajouri
Nowshera	Nowshera	

== See also ==
- List of districts in Azad Kashmir
- List of districts in Gilgit-Baltistan

== Bibliography ==
- Behera, Navnita Chadha (2007), Demystifying Kashmir, Pearson Education India, ISBN 978-8131708460
- Karim, Maj Gen Afsir (2013), Kashmir The Troubled Frontiers, Lancer Publishers LLC, pp. 30–, ISBN 978-1-935501-76-3
- Snedden, Christopher (2015), Understanding Kashmir and Kashmiris, Oxford University Press, ISBN 978-1-84904-342-7
- Larson, Gerald James. "India's Agony Over Religion", 1995, page 245
