= Ramgarh, Uttarakhand =

Ramgarh
- Town
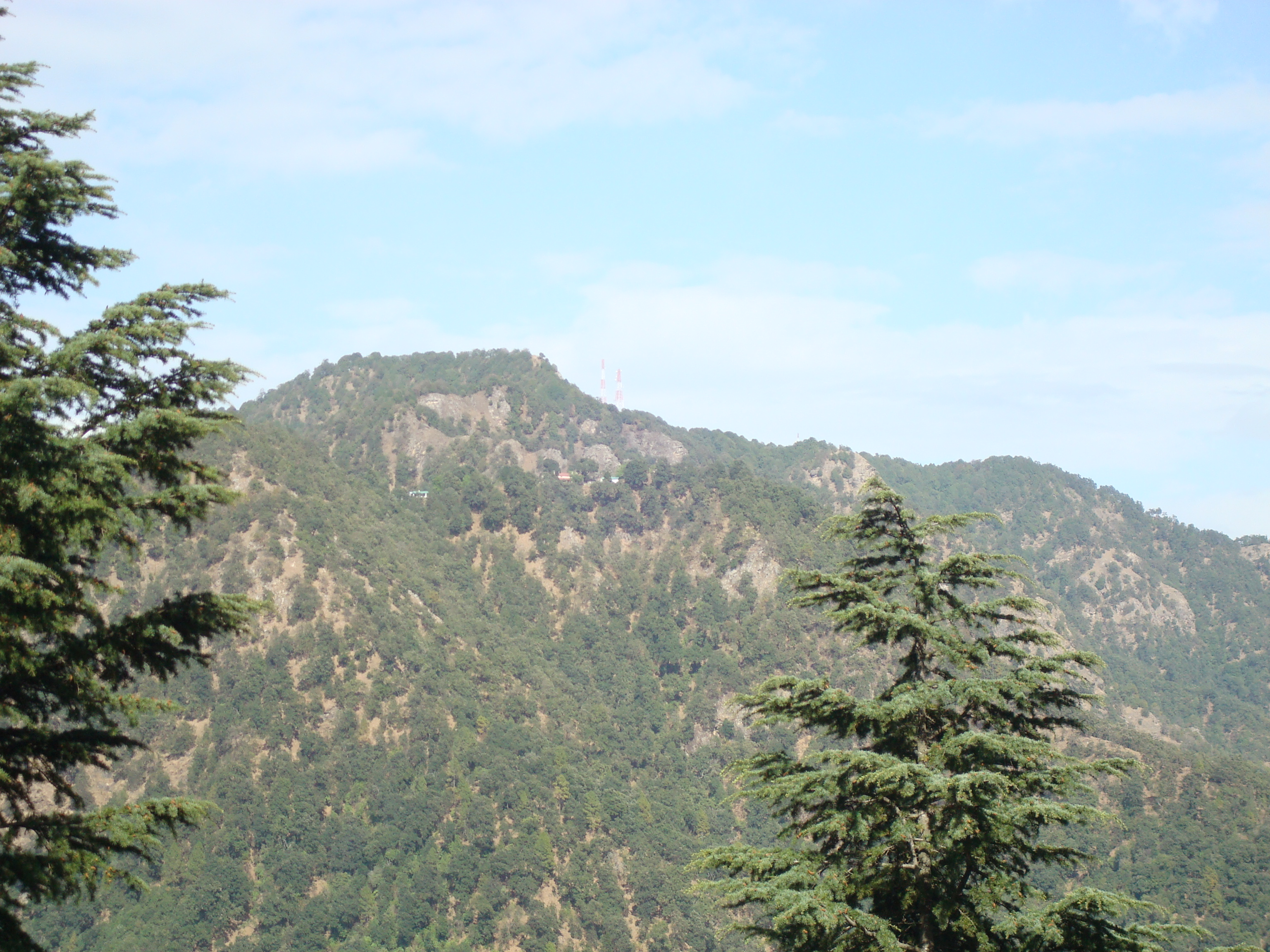
- View of a Himalayan peak from Ramgarh

- Location in Uttarakhand, India Ramgarh (India)
- Coordinates: 29.45°N 79.55°E
- Country: India
- State: Uttarakhand
- District: Nainital
- Elevation: 1,518 m (4,980 ft)

Languages
  - Official: Kumaoni
- Time zone: UTC+5:30 (IST)
- Vehicle registration: UK-04
- Website: nainital.nic.in

For other places with the same name, see Ramgarh

Ramgarh is a hill station and tourist destination in Nainital district of Uttarakhand, India. It is situated 30 km from Nainital, between to Mukteshwar and Bhimtal.

This place is rich in orchards and unobstructed view of the snow-capped ranges of the Himalayas from this place can be seen. The place was once the cantonment of the English army. The famous poets Rabindranath Tagore staying here for sometime and social worker Narain Swami had established his ashrams over here. The writers Ramdhari Singh 'Dinkar' and Sachchidananda Hirananda Vatsyayan, famous by his pen-name "Agyeya" also lived here. There is also a library dedicated to famous Hindi poet writer Mahadevi Varma, who got the idea of writing Lachma, the famous story, in Ramgarh.

== History ==
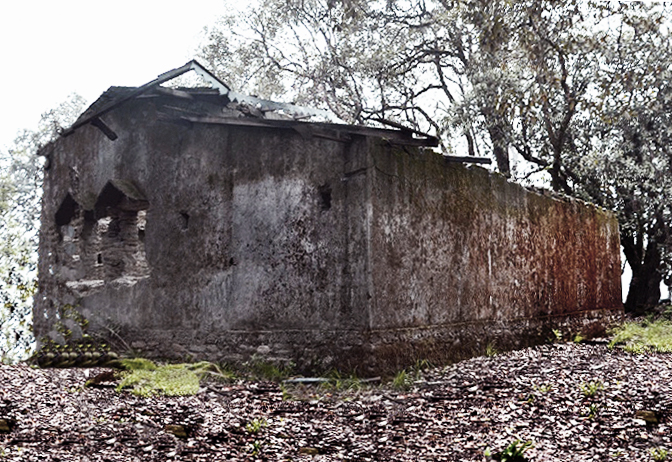
Tagore House at Ramgarh, where he stayed in 1914 (now in ruins).

Ramgarh has long been a retreat of writers, Nobel laureate Rabindranath Tagore being one of them. He stayed here several times over the years. He first came here in 1903, bringing his daughter Renuka Devi, who was recovering from tuberculosis. Subsequently, purchased a bungalow with a garden atop a hill and named it Haimanti. Thereafter, his revisited this place again in 1914, 1927 and 1937, and wrote several works here. The area where he stayed is known as Tagore Top and is accessible after a 4km trek. It lies 82,000ft above sea level, though the house where he stayed is now in a dilapidated condition; yet it continues to attract visitors. In 2020, Visva-Bharati University announced setting up a satellite campus at Ramgarh; this includes the around 10-acre area, which includes Tagore's hilltop bungalow.

In later years, Hindi poets Mahadevi Verma, Ramdhari Singh Dinkar and Sachchidananda Hirananda Vatsyayan (Agyeya) lived here. In fact, the house where Mahadevi Verma lived is now a public museum.

Madhuban, a retreat of Sri Aurobindo Ashram, Delhi Branch, was opened here in 2003 at Talla Ramgarh (Lower Ramgarh).

== Geography ==
Ramgarh is located at 29.45°N 79.55°E. Ramgarh is divided into parts- Talla (lower part) and the Malla (Upper part). It has an average elevation of 1,518 metres (4,980 feet). The altitude ranges from 1,400 metres in the Talla (Lower) Ramgarh valley to 1,900 metres in Malla (Upper) Ramgarh. The East-West ridge above Malla Ramgarh has an elevation of 2000–2350 metres.

== Economy ==
=== Tourism ===
Ramgarh, which is located near Mukteshwar, is visited and known by a few people.

Ramgarh is also known as the "Fruit Bowl of Kumaon" owing to its verdant orchards of peach, apricots, pears, and apples. It comprises two parts - Malla, located on a high elevation, and Talla, located downhill. It also has a famous viewing spot called Dadi Point.

Nearby locations include Gagar Shiv temple, Tagore Top, Madhuban, Sri Aurobindo Ashram, Hartola, Mukteshwar and Nathuakhan, all accessible from Nainital and Bhimtal.

== See also ==
- Nathuakhan
- Bhimtal
- Hartola
