= Birpur, Jammu and Kashmir =

Town in India

Birpur is a town located in the Samba district of Jammu and Kashmir, India. It holds historical importance due to its association with Raja Ranpat Dev, a notable Dogra ruler who contributed significantly to the cultural and administrative development of the region. Under his leadership, Birpur emerged as an important center for governance and community growth. Even today, traces of Dogra architecture and traditional cultural practices continue to reflect the region’s royal heritage and historical legacy.

== Geography ==
Birpur is a census town in Samba district in the Indian union territory of Jammu and Kashmir. It is situated in the southern part of the territory, close to the city of Jammu and forms part of the rapidly urbanizing Jammu–Samba corridor.

== Demographics ==
According to the 2011 Census of India, Birpur had a population of 7,177, comprising 3,841 males and 3,336 females. Children aged 0–6 years numbered 921, accounting for 12.83% of the total population.

The town recorded an average literacy rate of 83.49%, higher than the average literacy rate of the former state of Jammu and Kashmir at the time of the census. Male literacy was recorded at 90.03%, while female literacy stood at 75.99%.

Scheduled Castes constituted approximately 28.76% of the population, while Scheduled Tribes accounted for 6.33%. Of the total population, 1,956 residents were recorded as workers, with the majority classified as main workers under the Census of India methodology.

== Administration ==
Birpur is administered as a census town within Samba district. According to the 2011 Census, the town comprised 1,361 households. As a census town, local civic functions include the provision of municipal services such as roads, water supply and sanitation within the notified urban area.
