= Satkhol, Nainital =

Village in Uttarakhand, India

Satkhol
- Village
- Location in Uttarakhand, India Satkhol (India)
- Coordinates: 29.50087°N 79.62043°E
- Country: India
- State: Uttarakhand
- District: Nainital
- Sub-district: Nainital
- Community development block: Ramgarh

Government
  - Type: Gram panchayat
  - Body: Satkhol Gram Panchayat

Area
  - Total: 262.84 ha (649.5 acres)

Population (2011)
  - Total: 518
  - Density: 197/km^{2} (510/sq mi)
- Demonym: Satkhol resident

Languages
  - Official: Hindi
- Time zone: UTC+5:30 (IST)
- PIN: 263138
- Vehicle registration: UK
- Census village code: 054755

Satkhol village is situated in Ramgarh Block of District Nainital in the state of Uttarakhand, India. The village forms part of Satkhol Gram panchayat and is associated administratively with the Ramgarh community development block

== Background ==
Satkhol village is located 55 km away from district headquarters Nainital and is dependent on nearest town Bhowali which is 45 kilometers away for major economic activities. The village which is a good tourist destination

== Demographics ==
According to the 2011 Census of India record, Satkhol had a population of 518 people in 111 households. The population comprised 275 males and 243 females. The recorded geographical area of the village was 262.84 hectares. The Census-derived record also listed 144 residents as belonging to Scheduled Castes and no residents as belonging to Scheduled Tribes. Total literacy rate of village is 80.31% with males being 86.18% and females being 73.66%.

== Notable site ==
- Sri RamChandara Mission: Satkhol is the location of the Himalayan Ashram of the Shri Ram Chandra Mission, a centre for meditation, spiritual practice and public-welfare activities In June 2026, the Governor of Uttarakhand participated in a programme at the ashram.

== Important people ==
- Salman Khurshid

== See also ==
- Nainital district
- Ramgarh
- Bhowali
