= Ramgarh, Jammu and Kashmir =

Town in Jammu and Kashmir, India

Ramgarh
- Town
- Location in Samba district, Jammu and Kashmir, India Ramgarh (India)
- Coordinates: 32.5167°N 74.9500°E
- Country: India
- State: Jammu and Kashmir
- District: Samba

Population (2001)
  - Total: 4,540

Languages
  - Official: Hindi, Dogri
  - Others: Kashmiri
- Time zone: UTC+5:30 (IST)

Ramgarh is a town and a notified area committee, near Samba city in Samba District in the Indian union territory of Jammu and Kashmir. Ramgarh is 18 km (11 mi) from Samba city, the district headquarter and 9 km (5.6 mi) from Vijaypur city National Highway.

First Member Jammu and Kashmir Legislative Assembly Dr Devinder Kumar Manyal

== Demographics ==
As of 2001 India census, Ramgarh had a population of 4,540. Males constitute 52% of the population and females 48%. Ramgarh has an average literacy rate of 67%, higher than the national average of 59.5%: male literacy is 75%, and female literacy is 59%. 14% of the population of Ramgarh is under 6 years of age.

== Gallery ==
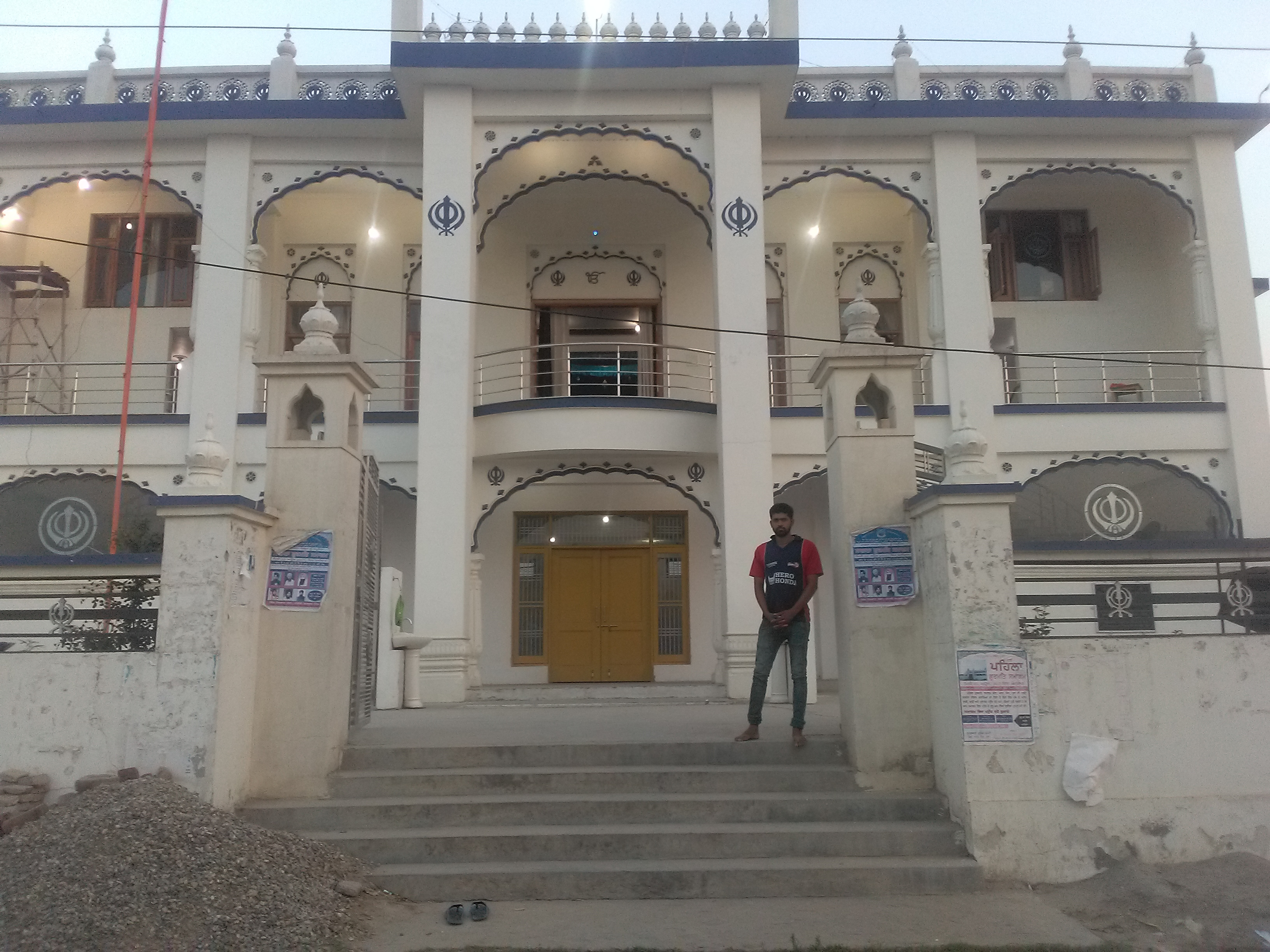
Gurdwara Sahib Sikh Temple Ramgarh

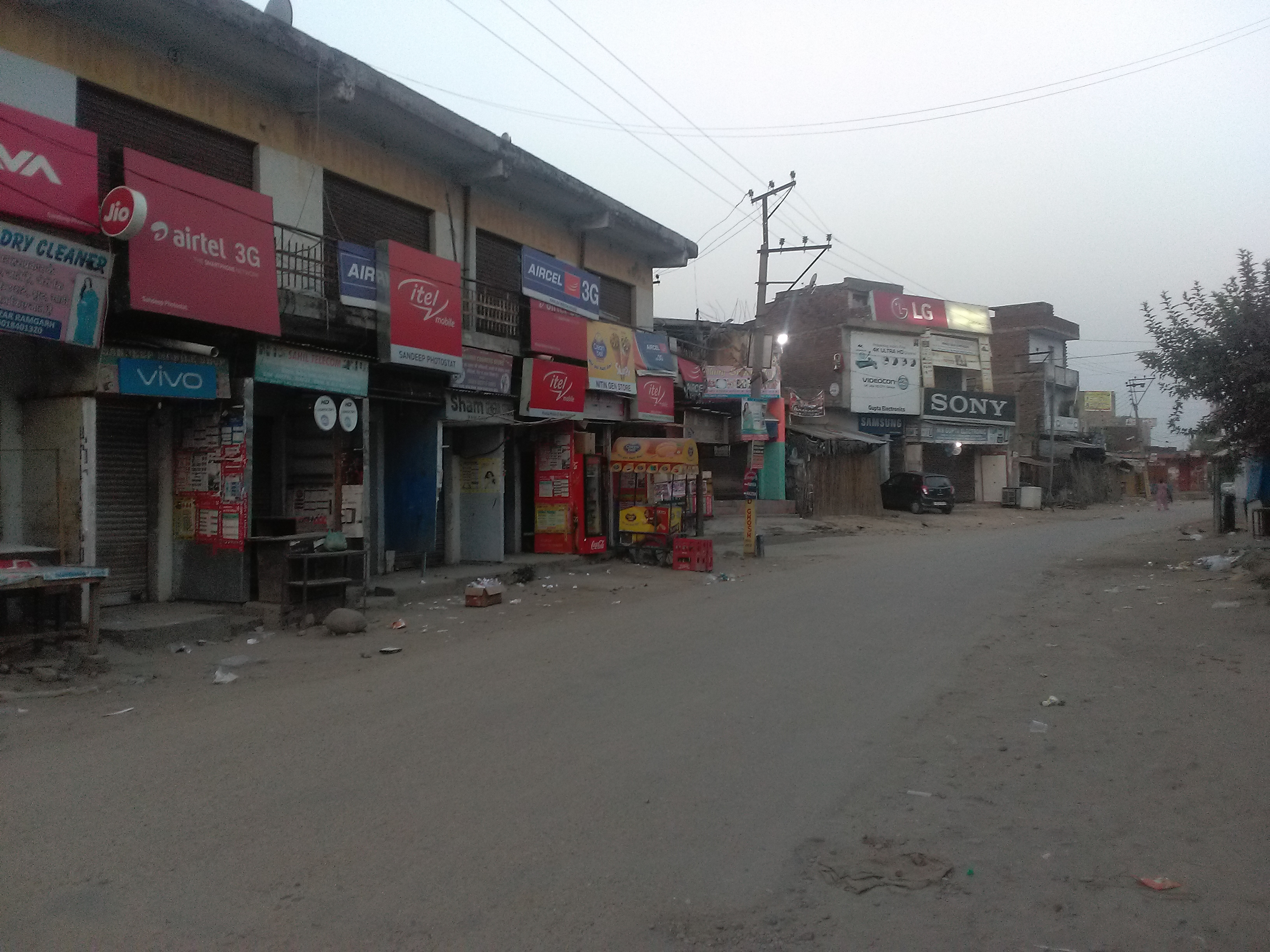
Ramgarh Main Market

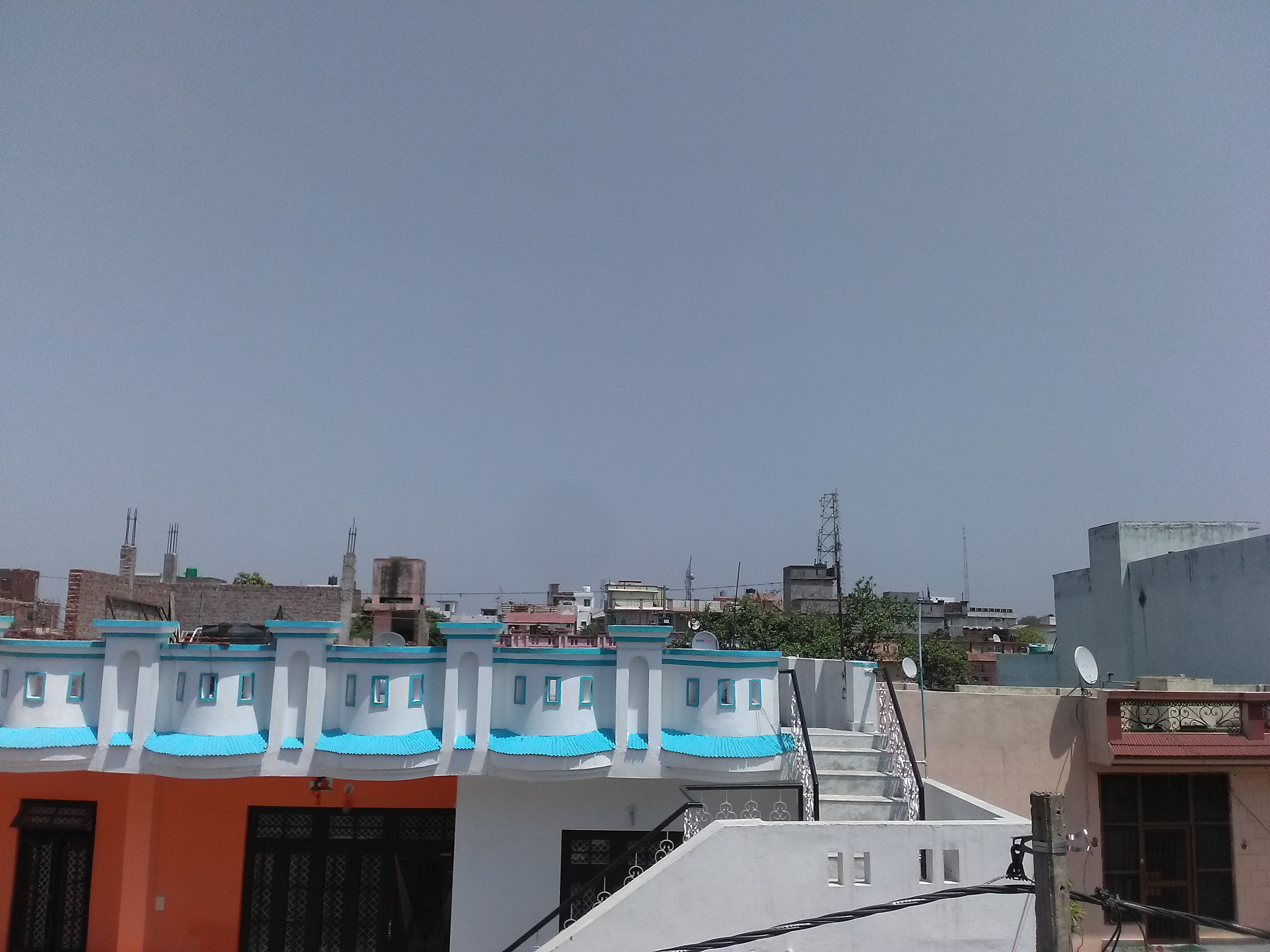
Houses Architecture in Ramgarh Town
