= Rehian =

Rehian or Rahian is a village in Samba district of Jammu and Kashmir union territory of India. It mainly comprises with the population of Sambyal and charak families. It has two schools one private and one government.
