= Ramgarha, Bhopal =

Ramgarha
- village
- Location within Madhya Pradesh Location within India
- Coordinates: 23.649718°N 77.358284°E
- Country: India
- State: Madhya Pradesh
- District: Bhopal
- Tehsil: Berasia
- Elevation: 493 m (1,617 ft)

Population (2011)
  - Total: 1,158
- Time zone: UTC+5:30 (IST)
- ISO 3166 code: IN-MP
- 2011 census code: 482225

Ramgarha is a village in the Bhopal district of Madhya Pradesh, India. It is located in the Berasia tehsil.

== Demographics ==
According to the 2011 census of India, Ramgarha has 227 households. The effective literacy rate (i.e. the literacy rate of population excluding children aged 6 and below) is 55.1%.

Demographics (2011 Census)
	Total	Male	Female
Population	1158	601	557
Children aged below 6 years	167	89	78
Scheduled caste	193	97	96
Scheduled tribe	23	11	12
Literates	546	350	196
Workers (all)	520	297	223
Main workers (total)	297	270	27
Main workers: Cultivators	284	258	26
Main workers: Agricultural labourers	4	4	0
Main workers: Household industry workers	0	0	0
Main workers: Other	9	8	1
Marginal workers (total)	223	27	196
Marginal workers: Cultivators	191	13	178
Marginal workers: Agricultural labourers	29	13	16
Marginal workers: Household industry workers	0	0	0
Marginal workers: Others	3	1	2
Non-workers	638	304	334
