= Vijaypur, Jammu and Kashmir =

Vijaypur Bajipur, Bajpur, Baipur, Baichper
- Town
- Vijaypur
- Location in Jammu and Kashmir, India Vijaypur (India)
- Coordinates: 32.585°N 75.00°E
- Country: India
- Union Territory: Jammu and Kashmir
- District: Samba

Government
  - Type: Municipal Committee
  - Body: Samba-Vijaypur Municipal Committee

Population (2011)
  - Total: 21,044
- Time zone: UTC+5:30 (IST)
- Postal code: 184120
- Vehicle registration: JK 21

Vijaypur is a town, tehsil and municipal committee in the Samba district of the Indian union territory of Jammu and Kashmir, situated on the bank of Devak River, known locally as Gupt Ganga. It is one of the most fast-growing towns near Jammu city in Jammu division.

== Demographics ==
As of 2011 India census, Vijaypur had a population of 21044. Males constitute 51% of the population and females 49%. Vijaypur has an average literacy rate of 73%, lower than the national average of 74.4%: male literacy is 77%, and female literacy is 69%.

== Religion ==
Hindu 88.65%, Sikh 7.48%, Muslim 1.38%,
