= Mukteshwar =

- Village
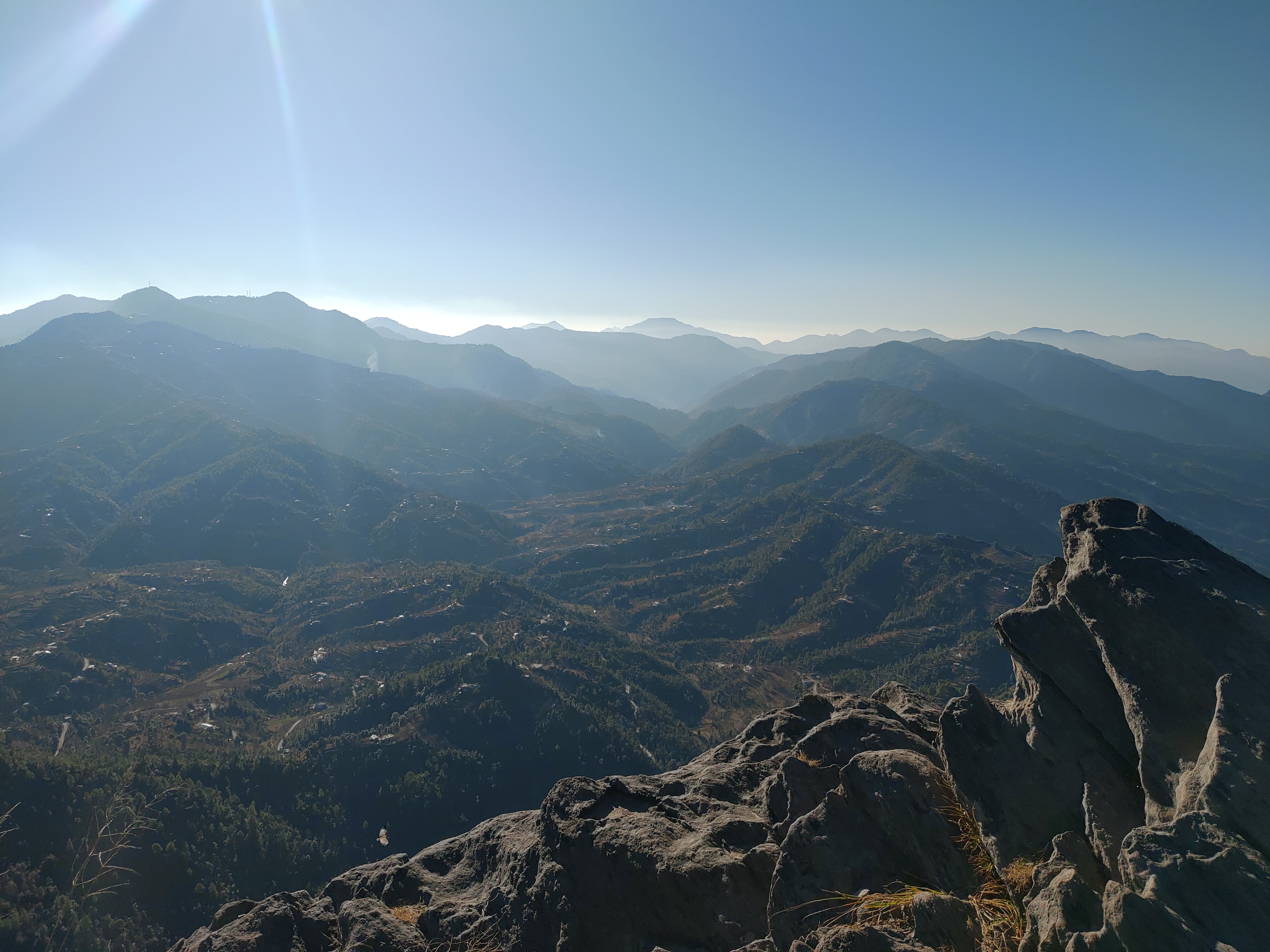
- View from Chauli Ki Jali, Mukteshwar

- Location in Uttarakhand, India Mukteshwar (India)
- Coordinates: 29.4722°N 79.6479°E
- Country: India
- State: Uttarakhand
- District: Nainital
- Elevation: 2,171 m (7,123 ft)

Population (2011)
  - Total: 812

Languages
  - Official: Hindi
- Time zone: UTC+5:30 (IST)
- PIN: 263138
- Telephone code: 05942
- Vehicle registration: UK-04
- Website: uk.gov.in

Mukteshwar is a village and tourist destination in the Nainital district of Uttarakhand, India. It sits high in the Kumaon Hills at an altitude of 2171 meters (7500 feet), 51 km from Nainital, 72 km from Haldwani, and 343 km from Delhi.

== Places of interest ==
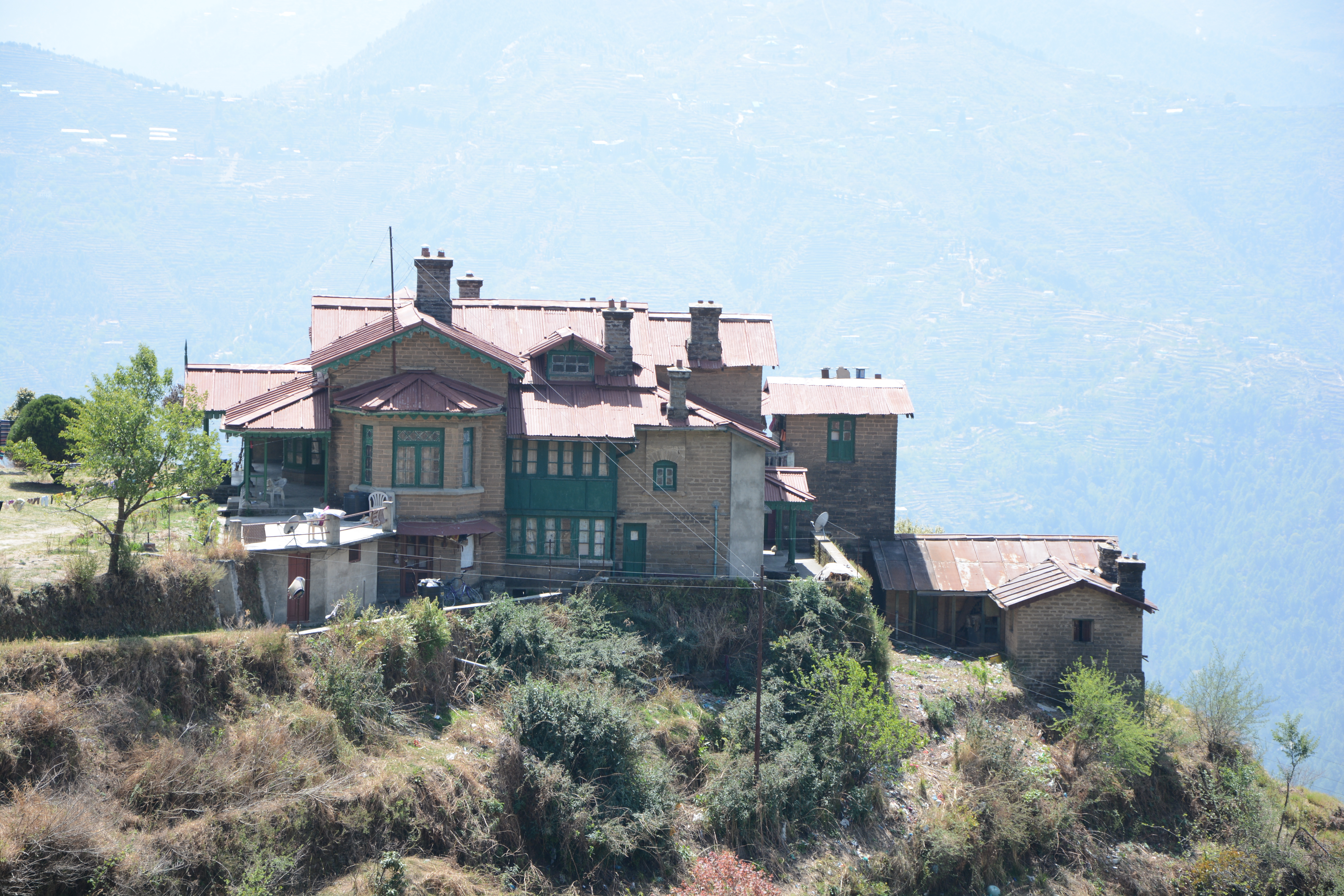
A House made on hill at Mukteshwar

=== Mukteshwar Shiva temple ===
Mukteshwar gets its name from a 350-year-old temple of Shiva, known as Mukteshwar Dham, situated atop the highest point in the town, on the veterinary institute's campus. Close to it lie the overhanging cliffs, locally known as Chauli-ki-Jali, used for rock climbing and rappelling, with an excellent view of the valleys below. Mukteshwar is famous for its breezy waterfalls such as The Bhalu Ghaad, Tarikhet waterfalls, Rudradhari waterfall and Dhokaney waterfall. The sunrise point is at the government-run PWD guest house. Another tourist attraction is the small Satoli Village, situated just 21 km from Mukteshwar. One can also visit the Indian Veterinary Research Institute (IVRI).

=== Other ===
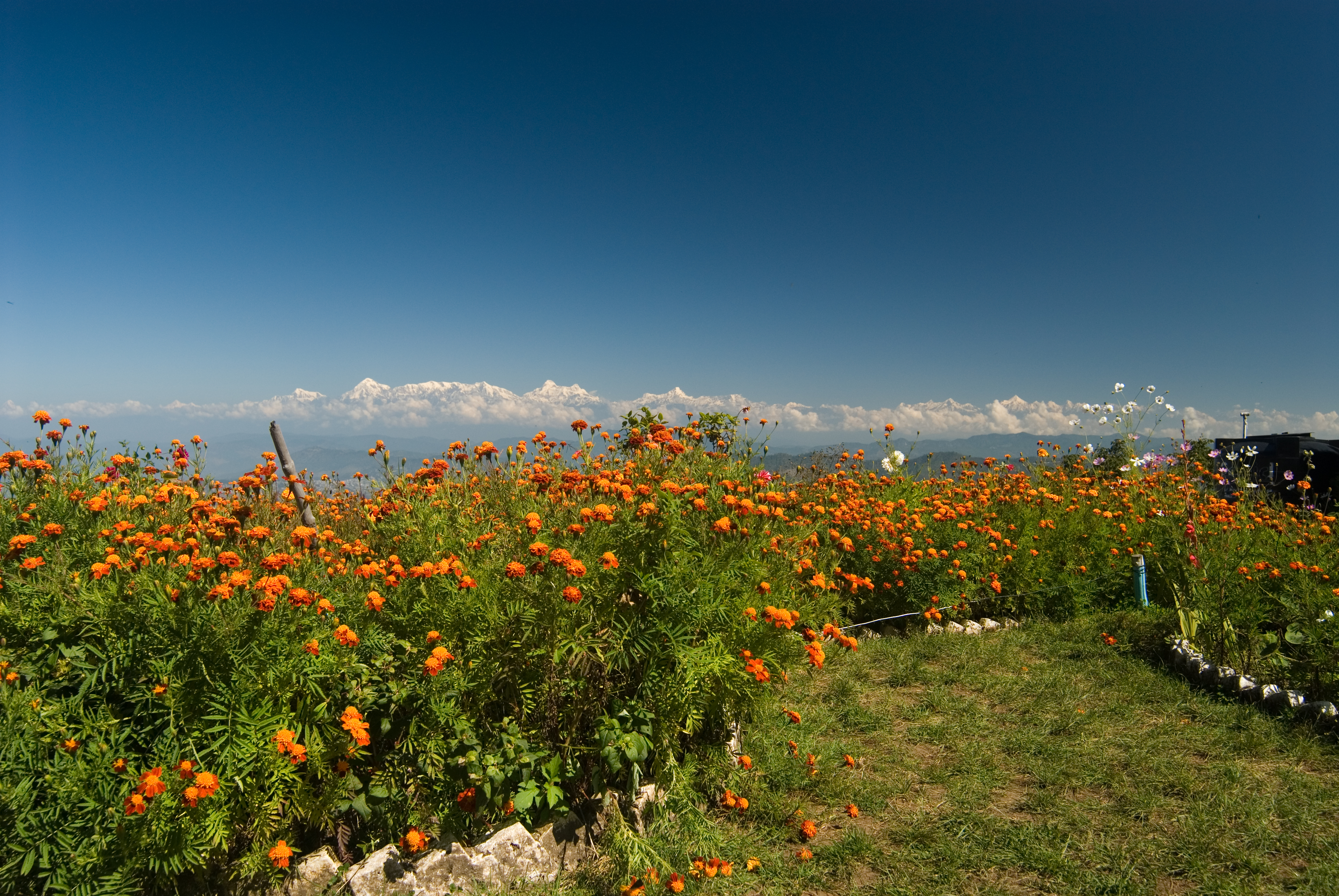
View of Himalayas from the top of Mukteshwar

Some of Mukteshwar's edifices are the IVRI laboratories (experiments on tiny rats, gold-plated books, cattle-sheds), orchards of the Central Institutes of Temperate Horticulture-Regional Station, a deodar forest (Himalayan cedar) measuring 15 square miles, 22 snow-peak views, and living amongst wildlife such as tigers and bears.The charm of visiting Mukteshwar lies in enjoying nature, bird watching, meditation, and seeking peace. The quiet nature attract people escaping urban life.

Mukteshwar is also home to a post office founded in 1905 which finds mention in Jim Corbett's writing.

== History ==
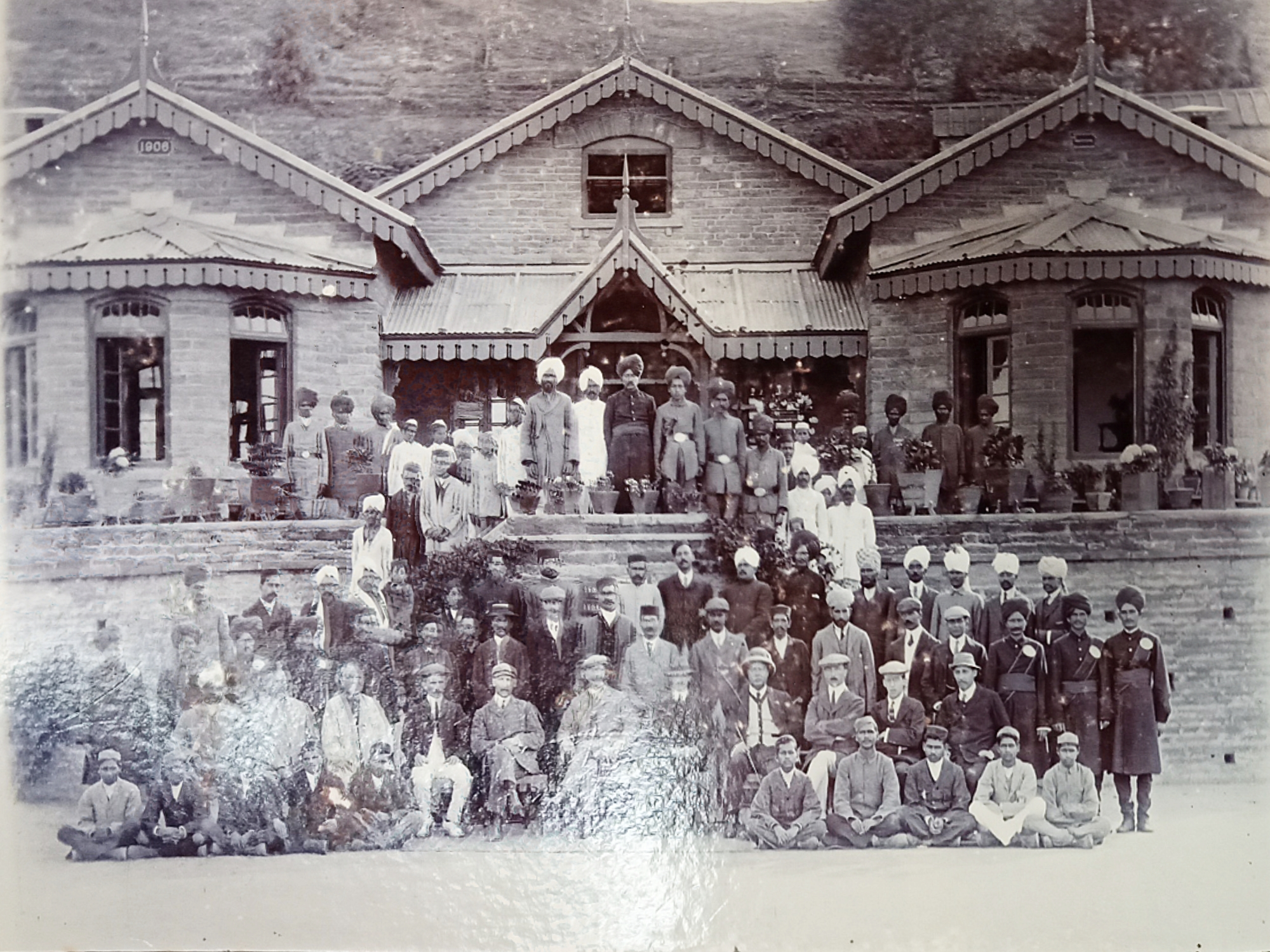
IVRI Mukteshwar c.1910

Mukteshwar was previously known as Muktesar (as mentioned in Jim Corbett's book "The Temple Tiger"); the name changed after 1947. Many locals still call it Muktesar in their native language. Until 1893 the place was known for its shrines and temple before it was selected for serum production to protect animals from cattle plague. On the recommendation of the Cattle Plague Commission, the Imperial Bacteriological Laboratory had its genesis on 9 December 1889 at Pune and relocated to Mukteshwar in 1893 to facilitate segregation and quarantine of highly contagious organisms. Initially the laboratory at Mukteshwar was completed in 1898 but destroyed by fire in 1899. It was resurrected in 1901. Then annual expenditure on research was Rs. 50,000. Later it was developed into the Indian Veterinary Research Institute (IVRI), which later moved its headquarters to Izatnagar. Still Mukteshwar serves as the hill campus of IVRI, including facilities such as an experimental goat farm.

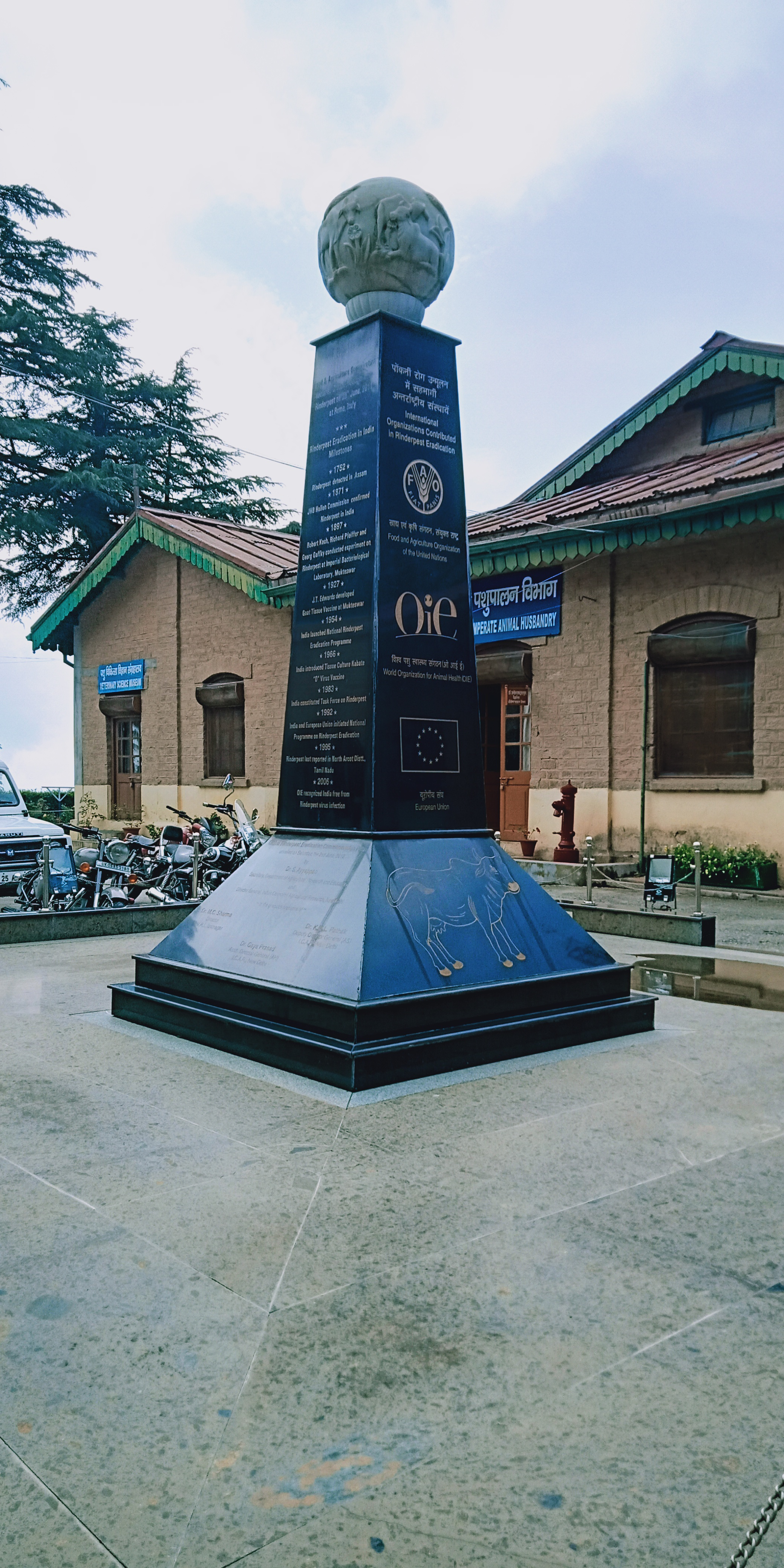
Rinderpest memorial Mukteshwar (2019) photo by Shyamal

The Nobel winner scientist Robert Koch visited this place on the request of the government of India. The microscope used by him and other historical articles are kept in the museum maintained by IVRI. A hill carved cold room dating back to 1900 once used to store biological materials is now a tourist attraction.

Jim Corbett, author and hunter of man-eating tigers and leopards visited Mukteshwar. He wrote about Mukteshwar in his book The Temple Tiger and More Man-Eaters of Kumaon. He wrote about the various adversities faced by the people inhabiting the villages in remote areas of the Northern hills.

== Rock climbing & rappelling ==
Fruit orchards, coniferous forests, lush green trails and narrow lanes make Mukteshwar a special destination for trekking. Apart from trekking, camping, paragliding; Mukteshwar is also known for rock climbing and rappelling. The region is full of hard rocky hills, which are suitable for rock climbing. Exotic travelers visit here to experience these activities. Rocky hills of Mukteshwar are quite strong. However, this adventure sport may be a little risky in the rainy days. Popular trails in Mukteshwar include:

- Peora to Almora
- Peora to Mukteshwar,
- Arta Trek from Binsar

== Geography ==
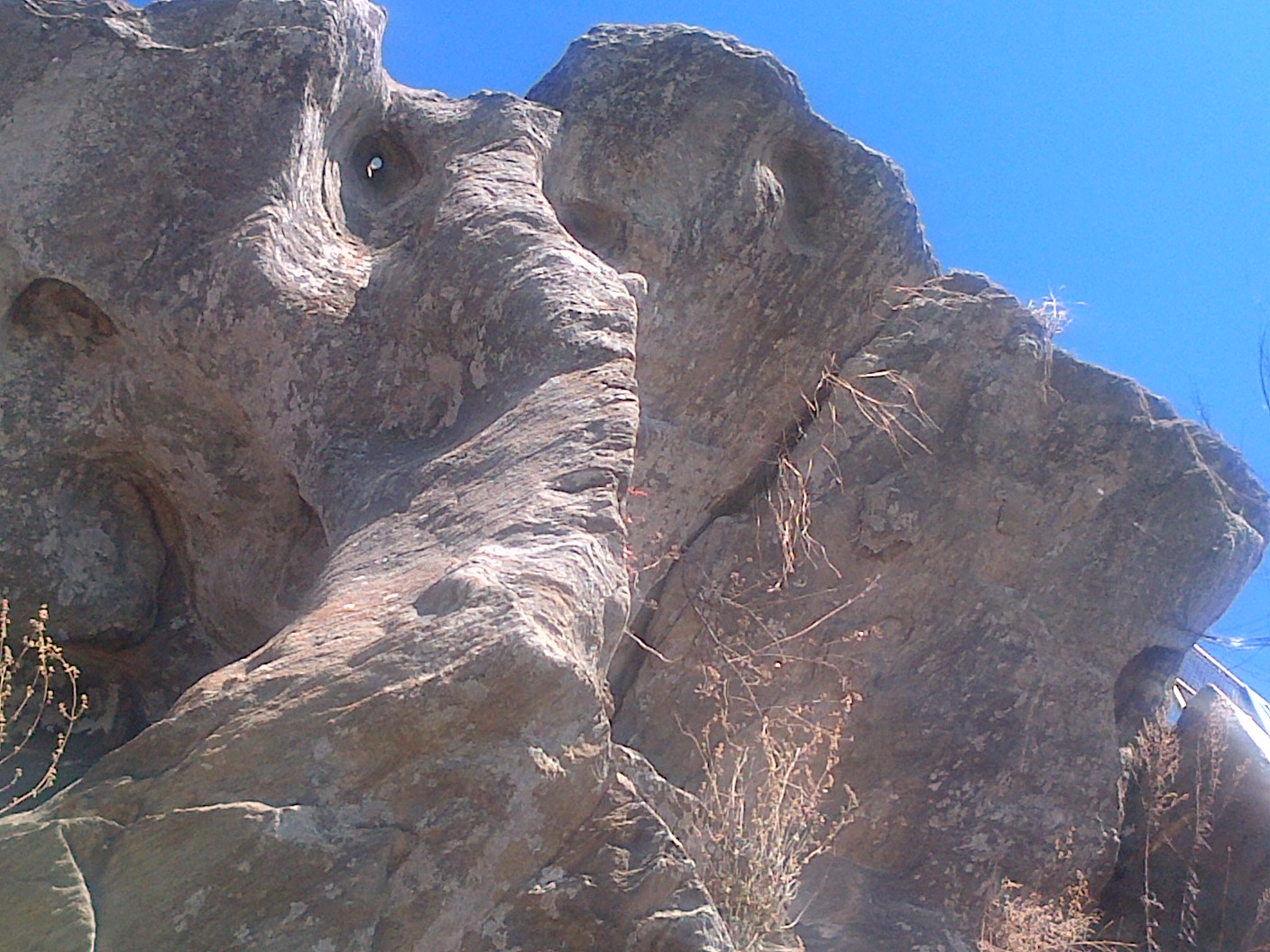
Monkey Face Stone at Mukteshwar

Mukteshwar

Climate chart (precipitation, max. and min. temperature)
J	F	M	A	M	J	J	A	S	O	N	D
54 11 2	57 12 2	50 16 1	35 21 10	58 23 13	157 23 14	307 21 14	299 20 14	202 20 13	61 19 10	8.8 16 6	23 13 3
- █ Average max. and min. temperatures in °C
- █ Precipitation totals in mm
- Source: World Weather Information Service (1901-2000)
Imperial conversion
J	F	M	A	M	J	J	A	S	O	N	D
2.1 51 35	2.2 53 36	2 61 33	1.4 69 50	2.3 74 55	6.2 74 58	12 70 58	12 68 57	8 68 55	2.4 66 49	0.3 60 43	0.9 55 38
- █ Average max. and min. temperatures in °F
- █ Precipitation totals in inches

Mukteshwar is located at 29.4722°N 79.6479°E. It has an average elevation of 2,171 metres (7,500 feet). Mukteshwar is situated in Nainital district at a distance of 51 km from Nainital, the district's administrative headquarter and 72 km from Haldwani, the largest city in Nainital.

Mukteshwar's scenery includes views of the Indian Himalayas and India's second-highest peak, Nanda Devi. Because of the hilly topography, agriculture in the area consists chiefly of potato fields and fruit orchards on terraces cut into the hillsides.

=== Climate ===
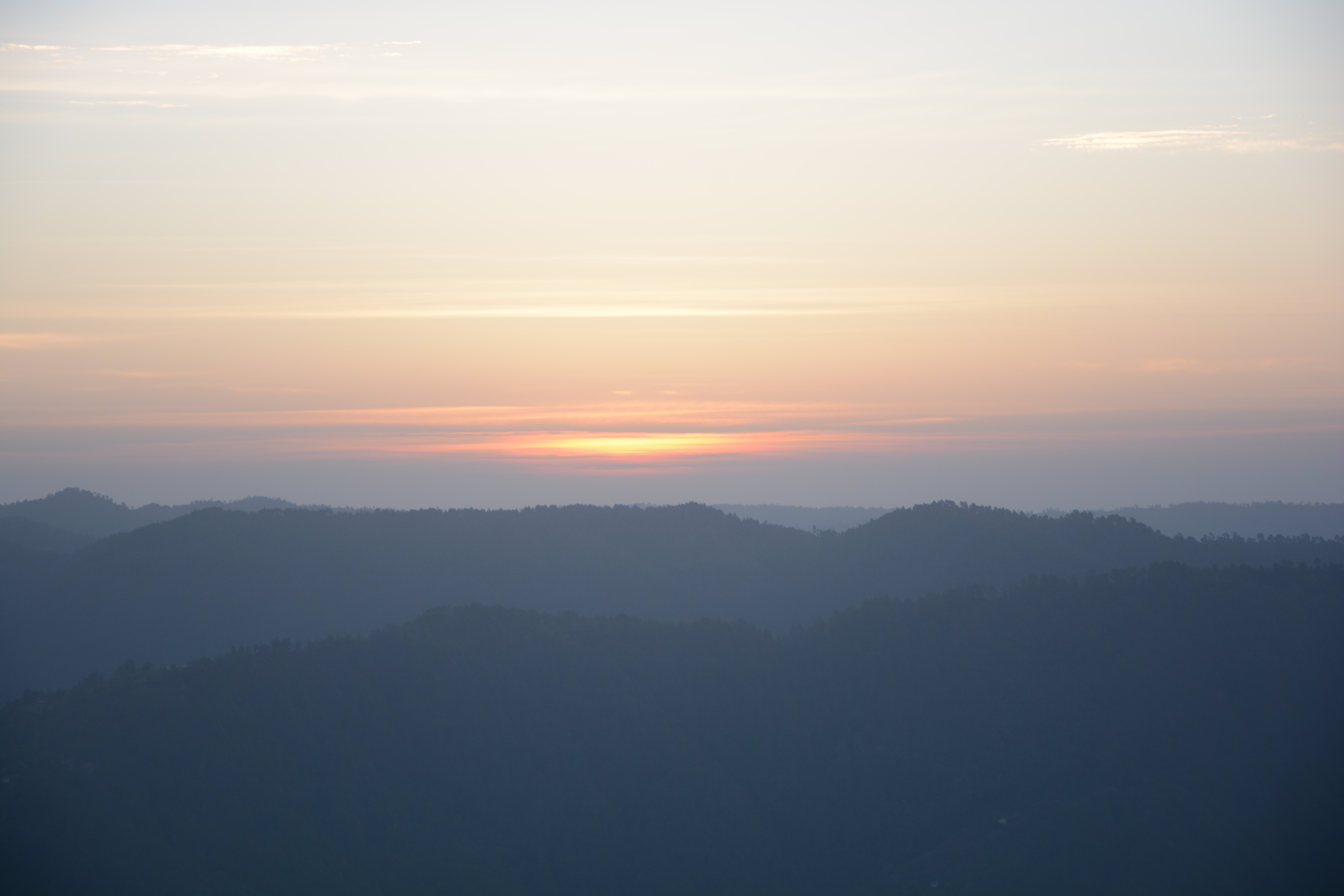
Sunset at Mukteshwar

Mukteshwar has a subtropical highland climate (Köppen climate classification Cwb). The pattern of seasons is similar to that in other parts of northern India, with distinct summer, monsoon and winter seasons. However, due to its high elevation, Mukteshwar is spared the intense heat of lower-lying towns and cities. Mukteshwar has cold winters and relatively cool summer with drastically escalated rain, in relation with lower altitudes, and frequent fog. Summers are warm with moderate rainfall, while the monsoon season is slightly cooler and features much heavier rain. Winters can be quite cool, and temperatures below freezing are not unusual. Snowfall occurs occasionally in December and January, though it is sparse, while the heavy rainfall events occurs during the monsoon season stretching from July to September.

Climate data for Mukteshwar (1991–2020, extremes 1901–2020)
Month	Jan	Feb	Mar	Apr	May	Jun	Jul	Aug	Sep	Oct	Nov	Dec	Year
Record high °C (°F)	23.0 (73.4)	24.2 (75.6)	28.5 (83.3)	31.5 (88.7)	31.1 (88.0)	32.5 (90.5)	30.6 (87.1)	27.9 (82.2)	26.8 (80.2)	25.5 (77.9)	23.1 (73.6)	22.5 (72.5)	32.5 (90.5)
Mean daily maximum °C (°F)	12.1 (53.8)	13.5 (56.3)	17.9 (64.2)	22.4 (72.3)	24.2 (75.6)	23.7 (74.7)	21.4 (70.5)	20.9 (69.6)	20.8 (69.4)	19.7 (67.5)	17.2 (63.0)	14.4 (57.9)	19.0 (66.2)
Mean daily minimum °C (°F)	1.7 (35.1)	2.7 (36.9)	5.8 (42.4)	9.7 (49.5)	12.1 (53.8)	13.8 (56.8)	14.2 (57.6)	13.9 (57.0)	12.6 (54.7)	9.3 (48.7)	6.1 (43.0)	3.6 (38.5)	8.8 (47.8)
Record low °C (°F)	−7.6 (18.3)	−7.8 (18.0)	−5.9 (21.4)	−1.7 (28.9)	2.3 (36.1)	5.9 (42.6)	8.1 (46.6)	9.8 (49.6)	6.1 (43.0)	0.8 (33.4)	−2.3 (27.9)	−5.7 (21.7)	−7.8 (18.0)
Average rainfall mm (inches)	45.6 (1.80)	68.1 (2.68)	46.8 (1.84)	46.2 (1.82)	63.9 (2.52)	158.6 (6.24)	288.4 (11.35)	283.4 (11.16)	228.9 (9.01)	30.4 (1.20)	7.9 (0.31)	17.7 (0.70)	1,286 (50.63)
Average rainy days	3.0	4.2	3.6	4.0	5.7	9.4	14.6	14.1	9.8	1.7	0.7	1.1	71.6
Average relative humidity (%) (at 17:30 IST)	61	63	57	45	56	71	88	90	86	73	67	58	68
Source: India Meteorological Department

== Kumaon Vani radio service ==
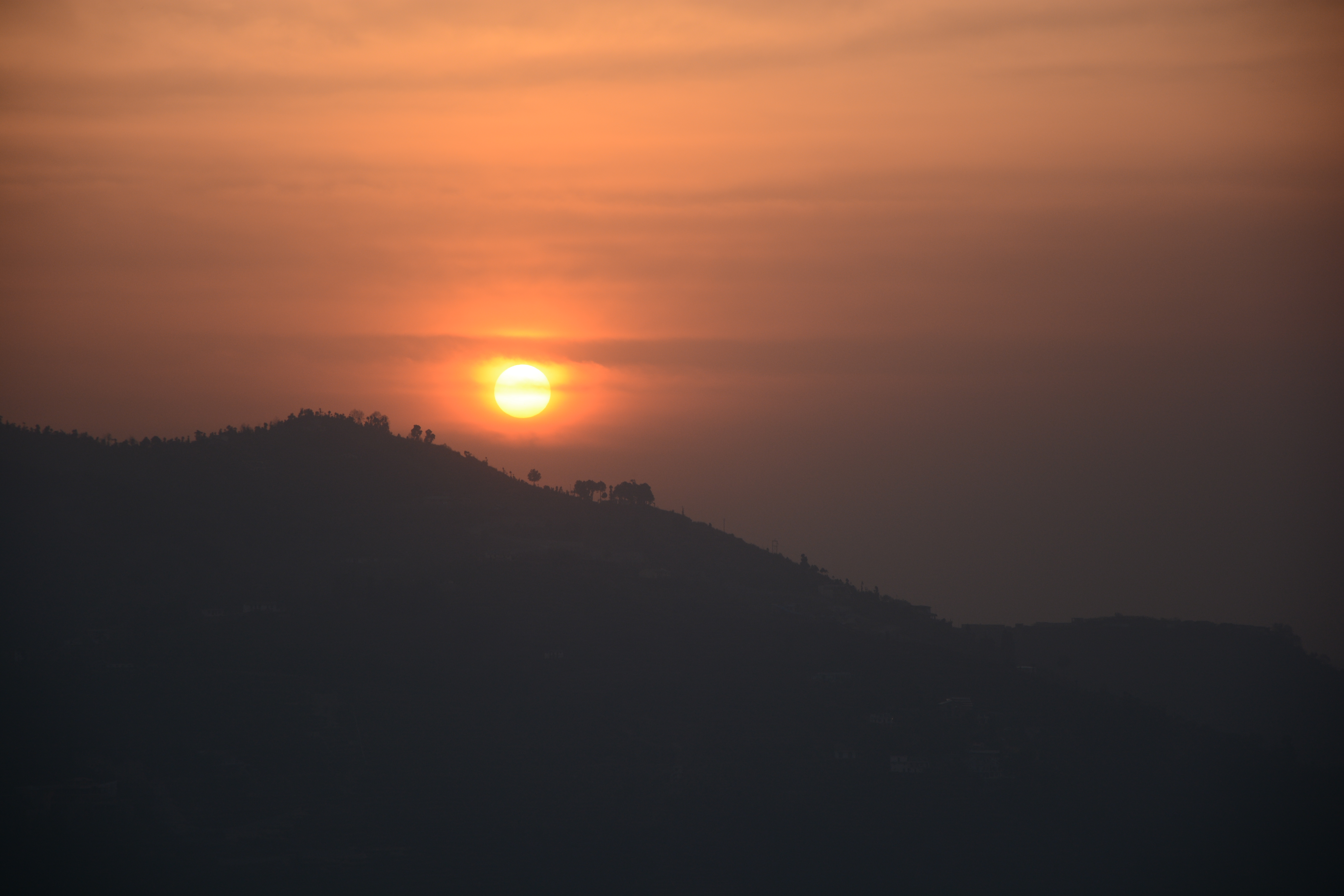
Sunset at Mukteshwar

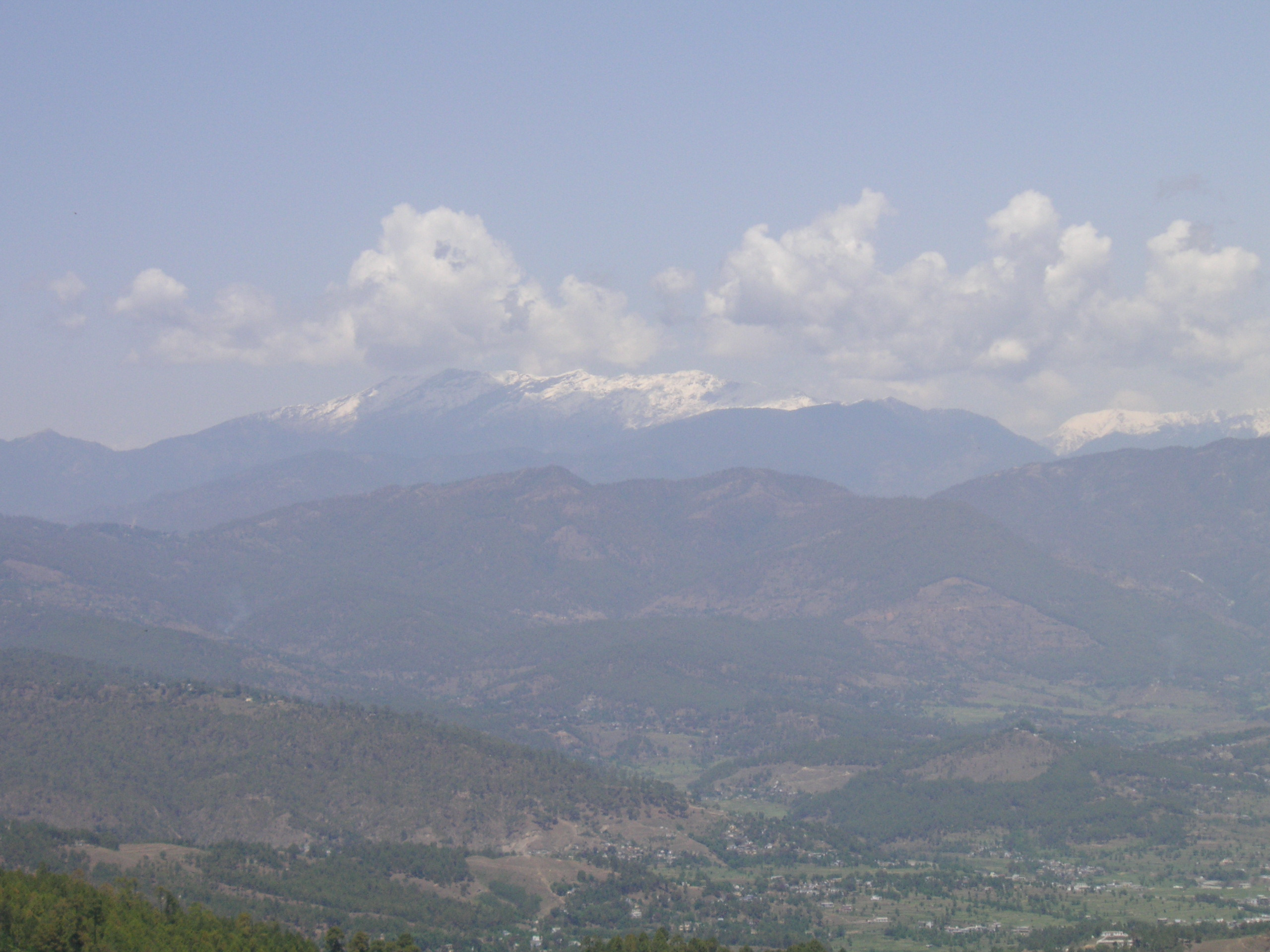
Mukteshwar in 2008

With the aim to create a common platform for local communities of Supi in Uttarakhand, TERI launched 'Kumaon Vani', a community radio service on 11 March 2010. Uttarakhand governor Margaret Alva inaugurated the radio station, the first in the state. The 'Kumaon Vani' aims to air programmes on environment, agriculture, culture, weather and education in the local language and with the active participation of the communities. The station covers a radius of 10 km reaching out to almost 2000 locals around Mukteshwar.

== New development ==
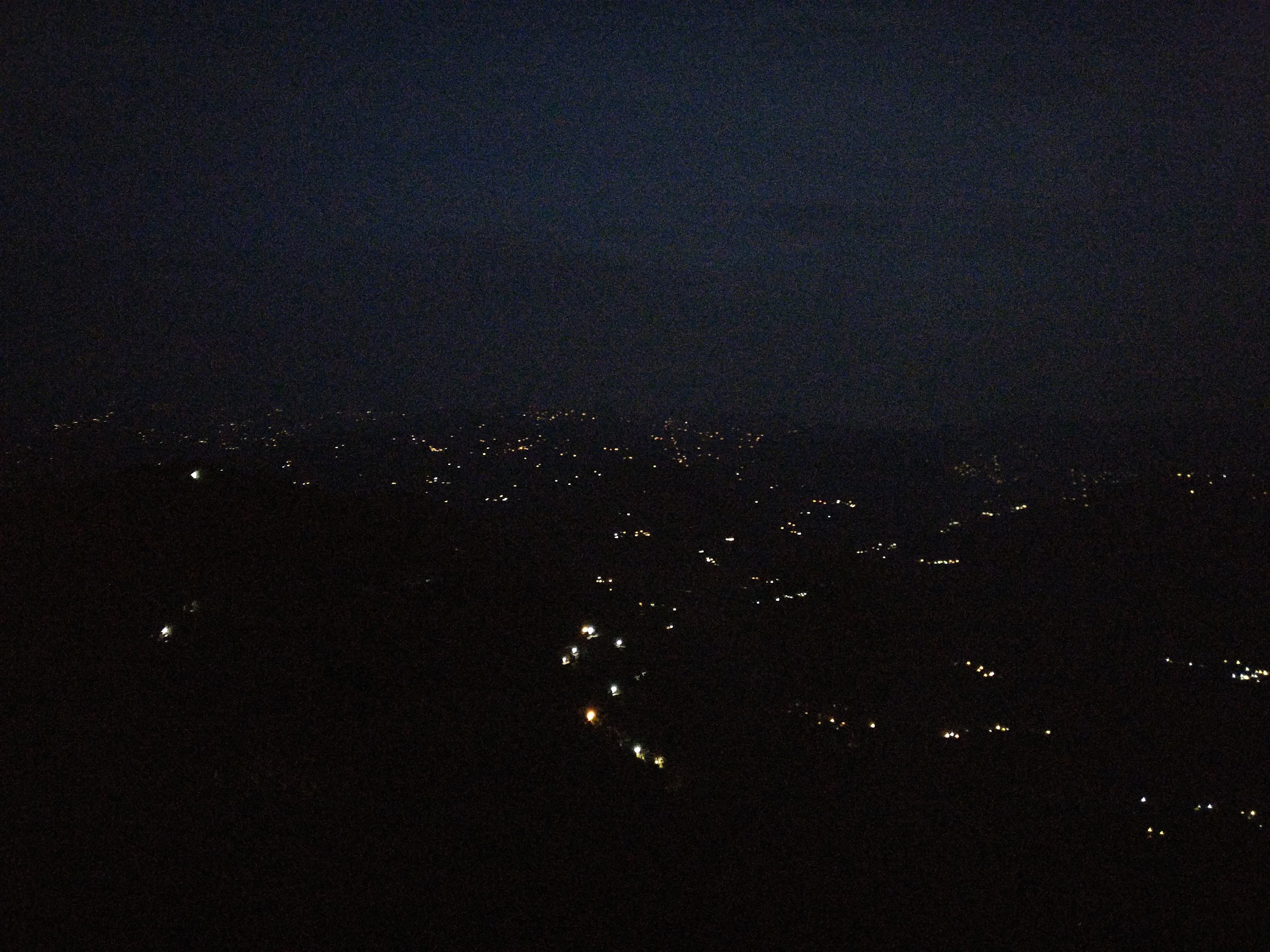
Mukteshwar at night

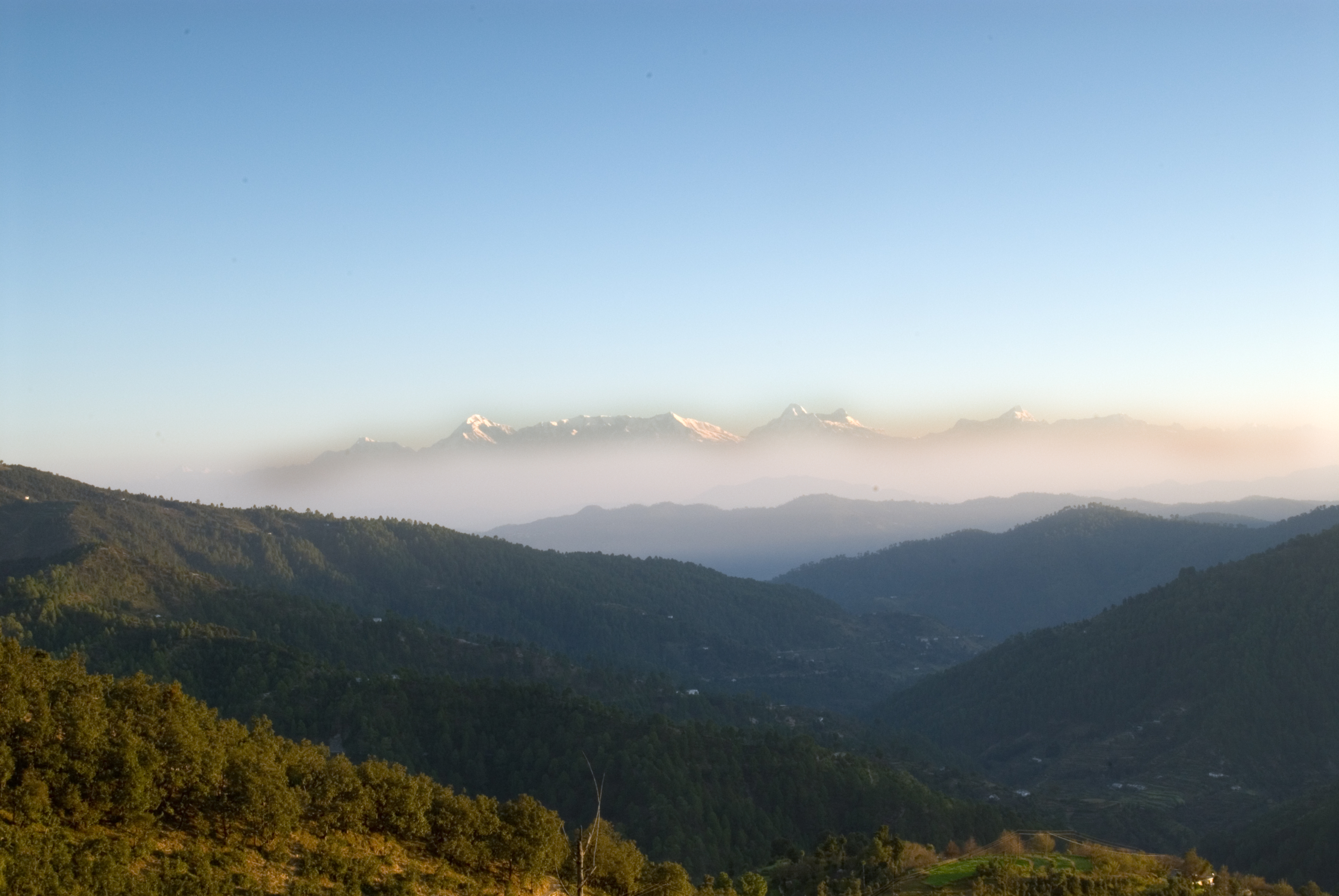
Mukteshwar, a view of the Himalayas.

There is a 'Renewable Park' developed by TERI. The renewable park uses solar electricity for most of its electricity needs. Recently, the town has experienced some construction activity and townships have begun to mushroom in and around Mukteshwar. Many people are buying holiday homes here to escape larger cities.

== Transport ==
The nearest airport is at Pantnagar and the nearest railway head is at Kathgodam, 65 km from the town, from where vehicular transport is easily available for neighbouring towns of Bhimtal, Bhowali, Haldwani and Nainital.

The other means of road transport in the city include Share taxis, regionally known as Jeeps, on-call metered taxis and tourist taxis. The state transportation bus service is available from Nainital.
