= Samba, Jammu and Kashmir =

Samba
- City administered by India
- Samba
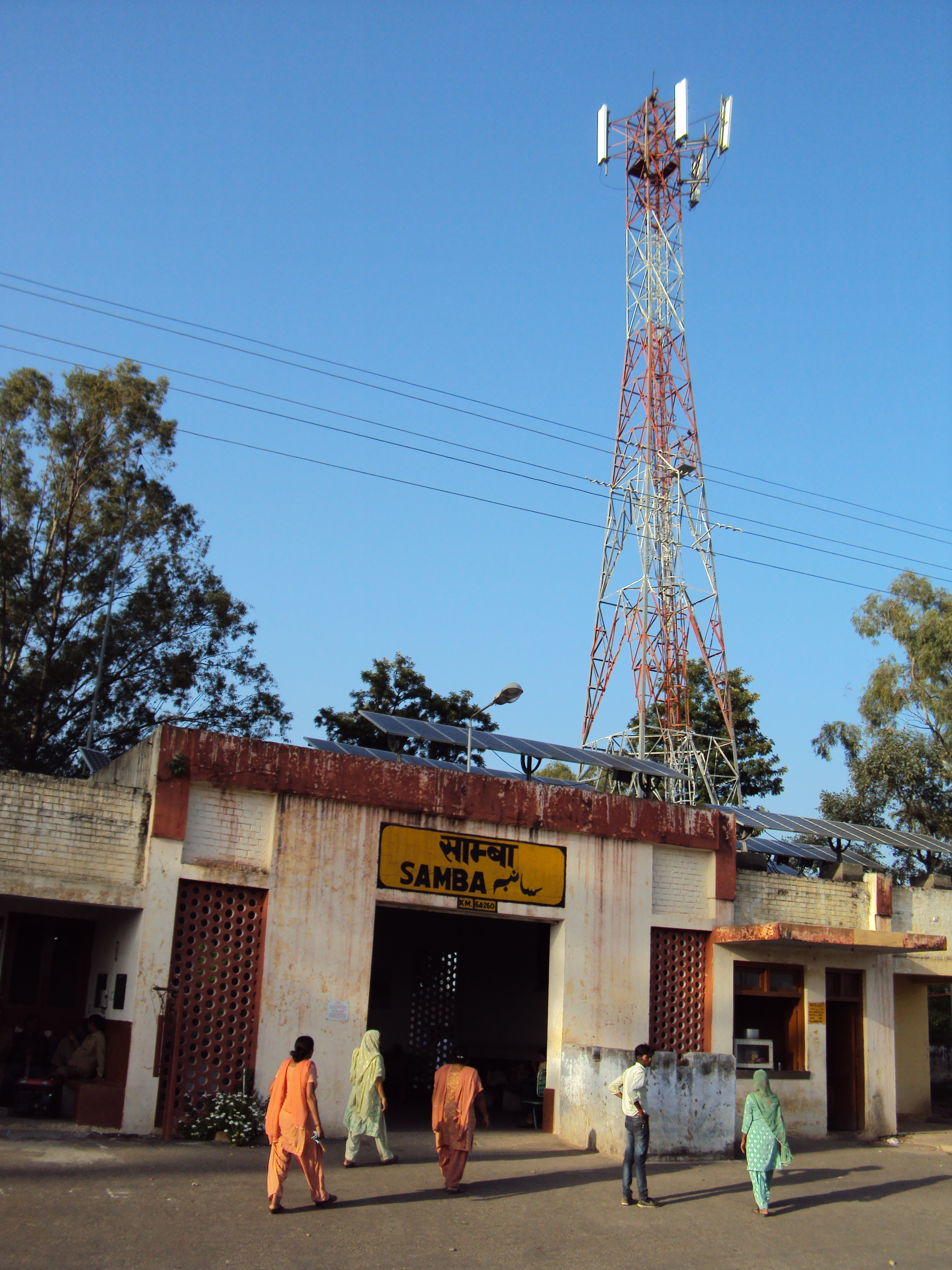
- View of Samba railway station in Samba, J&K, India
- Interactive map of Samba
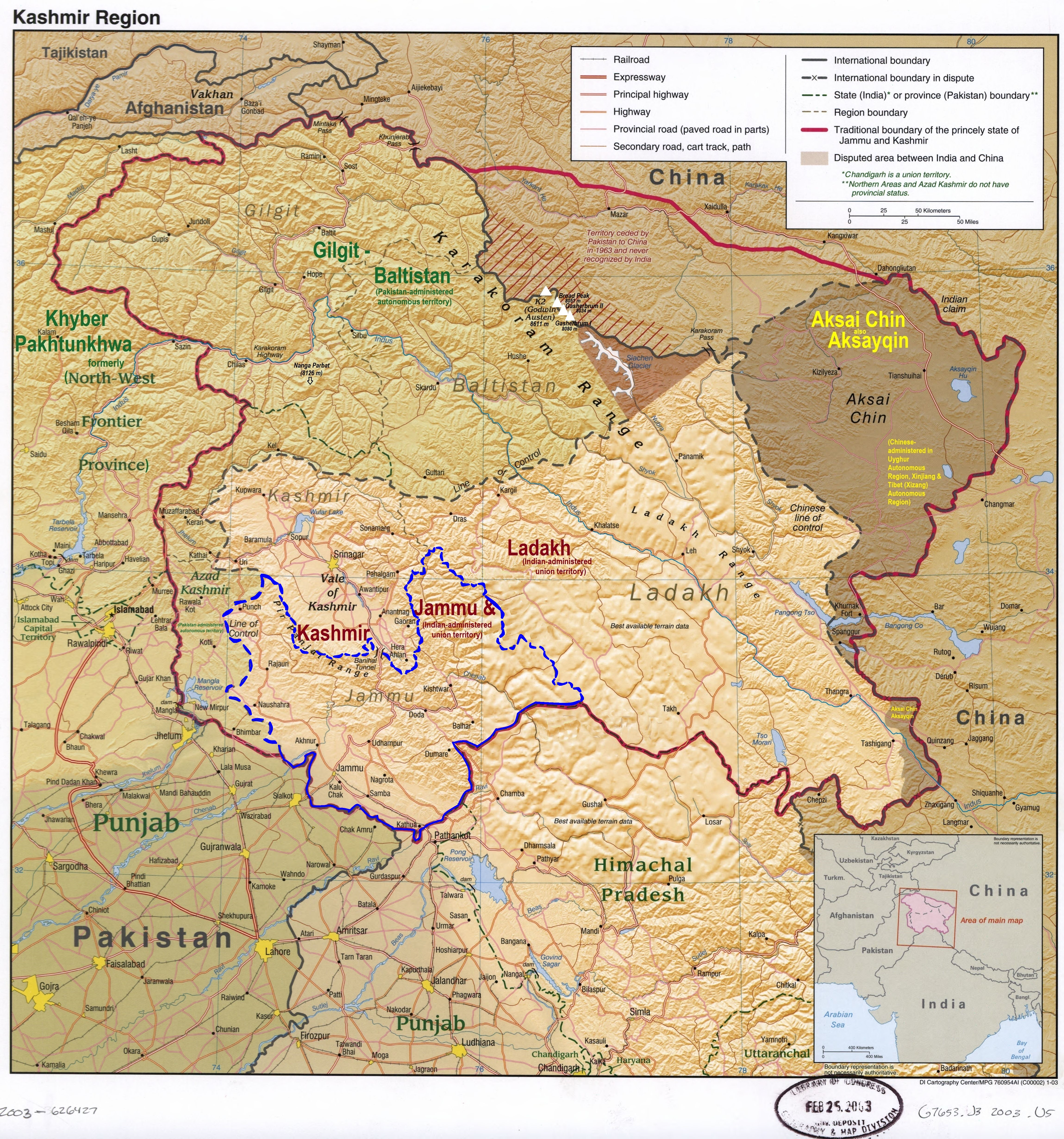
- Samba lies in the Jammu division (neon blue) of the Indian-administered Jammu and Kashmir (shaded tan).
- Coordinates: 32.57°N 75.12°E
- Administering Country: India
- Union Territory: Jammu & Kashmir
- District: Samba
- Named for: Sambyal Clan

Government
  - Type: Municipal Council
  - Body: Samba Municipal Council

Area
  - Total: 1.65 km^{2} (0.64 sq mi)
- Elevation: 384 m (1,260 ft)

Population (2011)
  - Total: 12,700
  - Density: 7,700/km^{2} (19,900/sq mi)
- Demonym: Sambaite

Languages
  - Official: Dogri, Hindi, Urdu, English
- Time zone: UTC+5:30 (IST)
- PIN: 184121
- Vehicle registration: JK21
- Website: http://samba.nic.in/

Samba is a city, municipal council, and administrative headquarter of Samba district of Indian-administered Jammu and Kashmir in the disputed Kashmir region. Samba has its own railway station on the Jammu-Delhi railway line and according to 2011 census, Samba is a town and Municipal Committee in Jammu and Kashmir, India.

== Geography ==
Samba is located at 32.57°N 75.12°E and has an average elevation of 384 m (1,260 ft). Samba is situated in the Shivalik Hills alongside the National Highway 1-A on the bank of the Basantar River, at a distance of 40 km (25 mi) from the city of Jammu. Samba District borders Udhampur District to the north, Kathua District to the east, Tehsils Jammu and Bishnah of Jammu District to the west, and the International Border Pakistan to the south.

== Demographics ==
=== Overview ===
Religion in Samba City (2011)
1. Hinduism (95.5%)
2. Christianity (2.08%)
3. Sikhism (1.76%)
4. Islam (0.47%)
5. Other / Not stated (0.15%)

According to a report released by Census India 2011, the Samba Municipal Committee has population of 12,700, of which 6979 (55%) are males while 5721 (45%) are females. There are 1365 children under seven years old, or 10.75% of the population. There are 2566 households in the city,

=== Caste distribution ===
By caste, 71% of Samba residents are from general caste, 28.57% are from schedule caste, and 0.04% are schedule tribes.

Population of Samba by Caste
	Total	General	Schedule Caste	Schedule Tribe	Children
Total	12,700	9066	3629	5	1365
Male	6979	5041	1934	4	756
Female	5721	4025	1695	1	609

=== Religion ===
In Samba, Hinduism is the dominant religion, while, Christians, Muslims and Sikhs are the minorities.

Population of Samba by Religion
	Total	Hindu	Muslim	Christian	Sikh	Buddhist	Jain	Others	Not Stated
Total (percentages)	100%	95.54%	0.47%	2.08%	1.76%	0.07%	0.00%	0.00%	0.08%
Total (population)	12,700	12,134	60	264	223	9	0	0	10
Male	6979	6644	42	128	156	4	0	0	5
Female	5721	5490	18	136	67	5	0	0	5

=== Population growth ===
The city's population decreased by 20.2% from 2001 to 2011. According to the 2001 census, Samba's total population was about 16,000. The female population growth rate was −8.1%, which was 19.9% higher than male population growth rate of −28%. The general caste population decreased by 27.9%, the schedule caste population increased by 8.5%, and the child population decreased by 24.7% between the two censuses.

=== Sex ratio ===
According to the 2011 census, Samba has 820 females per 1000 males compared to the state average of 889 females per 1000 males. For children under seven years old, there are 806 girls per 1000 boys in the city, compared to the state average of 862 girls per 1000 boys. Between 2001 and 2011, Samba's overall sex ratio and child sex ratio have increased by 177 females per 1000 males and 36 girls per 1000 boys, respectively.

=== Employment ===
In the census, a worker is defined as a person who does business or performs any job, service, cultivation, or labour activity. Of the population, 4356 (34%) are engaged in work or business activities. 91.80% of workers are engaged in Main Work (full-time), and 8.20% of workers are engaged in Marginal Work (part-time).

By sex, 3885 workers are males while 471 workers are females.

== Terrorist attacks ==
On 26 September 2013, militants impersonating army personnel attacked the Hiranagar Police Station. After the attack, the militants commandeered a truck to Samba, located 18 km (11 mi) from Hiranagar. The militants entered the army cantonment and opened fire. In a day-long operation and combat search, all three militants were killed. Twelve others, including a lieutenant colonel, were killed in this incident.

== Higher educational institutes ==
Higher educational institutes in Samba include the following:

- Bhargava Law College
- Central University of Jammu
