= Samba district =

- District of Jammu and Kashmir administered by India
- Interactive map of Samba district
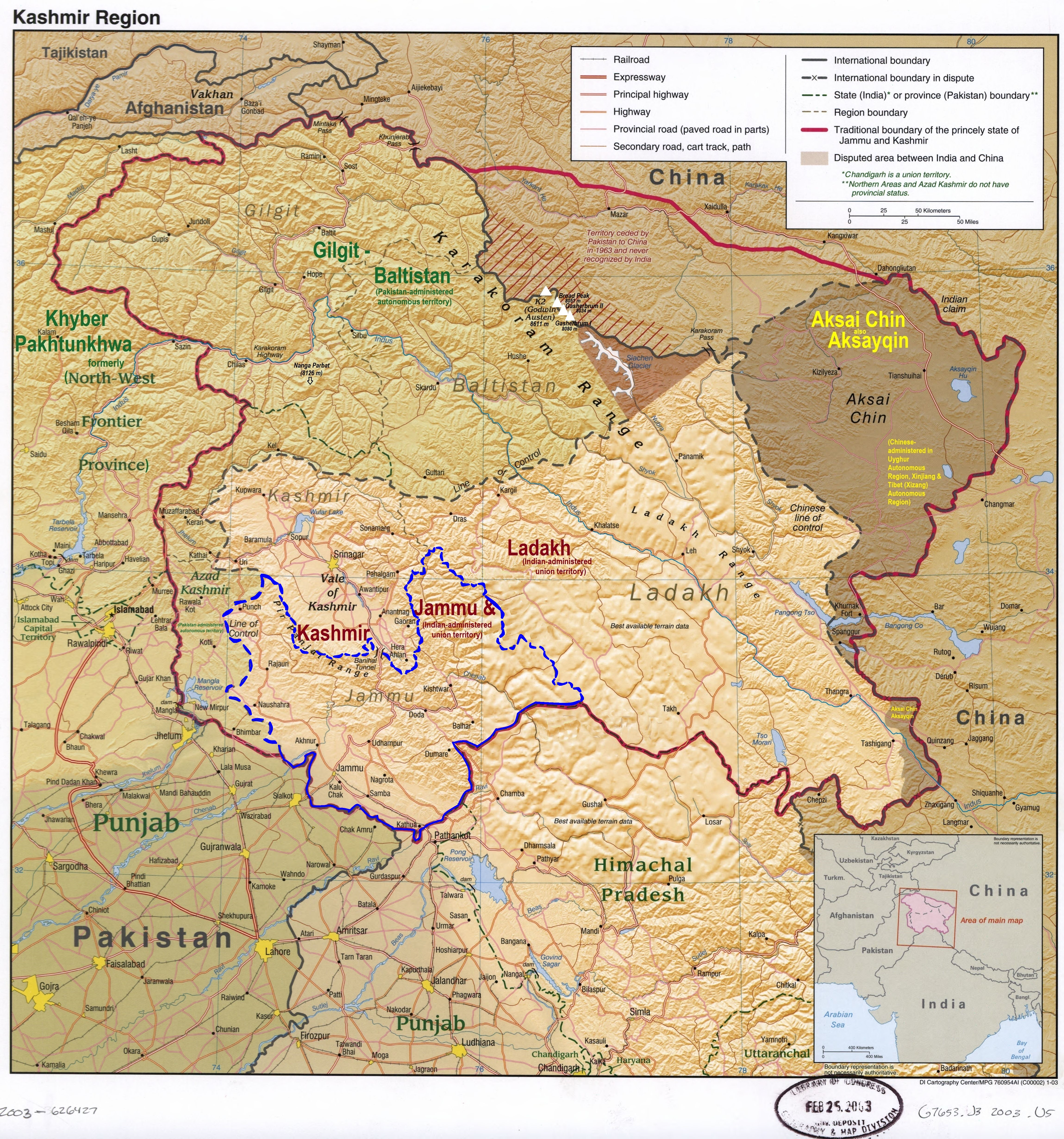
- Samba district is in the Jammu division (shown with neon blue boundary) of Indian-administered Jammu and Kashmir (shaded in tan in the disputed Kashmir region
- Coordinates (Samba, Jammu and Kashmir): 32°34′N 75°7′E
- Administering country: India
- Union Territory: Jammu and Kashmir
- Division: Jammu
- Headquarters: Samba, Jammu and Kashmir
- Tehsils: Samba

Government
  - District Magistrate: Anuradha Gupta (KAS)

Area
  - Total: 914 km^{2} (353 sq mi)

Population (2011)
  - Total: 318,898
  - Density: 349/km^{2} (904/sq mi)
  - Urban: 16.8%

Demographics
  - Literacy: 81.41%
  - Sex ratio: 886
- Time zone: UTC+05:30 (IST)
- Vehicle registration: JK-21
- Website: samba.nic.in

Samba district is an administrative district in the Jammu division of Indian-administered Jammu and Kashmir in the disputed Kashmir region. It was formed in 2006. Before its formation, this area was part of Jammu district and Kathua district. The district headquarters is Samba.

== History ==
Samba was reportedly established in 1400 AD. It came under the suzerainty of Jammu in 1816 A.D., while it was annexed by Raja Gulab Singh in 1846 A.D. Historically Samba consisted of 22 towns (also known as Mandi), each headed by a separate family. Prior to 1947, Samba was a tehsil. Samba became a district in 2006.

== Demographics ==
=== Population ===
Historical populations
Year	Pop.	±%
1901	61,553	—
1911	59,322	−3.6%
1921	60,600	+2.2%
1931	66,474	+9.7%
1941	75,836	+14.1%
1951	83,351	+9.9%
1961	90,865	+9.0%
1971	130,243	+43.3%
1981	181,005	+39.0%
1991	223,075	+23.2%
2001	272,539	+22.2%
2011	318,898	+17.0%
source: † 1951 and 1991 populations are estimated

According to the 2011 census, Samba District had a population of 318,898, roughly equal to The Bahamas. It is the 568th largest in India (of 640). The district has a population density of 318 inhabitants per square kilometre (820/sq mi). Its population growth rate over the decade of 2001 to 2011 was 16.9%.

=== Ethnic groups ===
Dogras are a major ethnolinguistic group of the Sambha district. Other major districts's ethnolinguistic groups are Punjabi and Gujjars. Dogras are primarily Hindus and Gujjars are Muslims.

=== Languages ===
Languages of Samba district (2011)
1. Dogri (84.5%)
2. Punjabi (4.95%)
3. Gujari (Gojri) (4.32%)
4. Hindi (2.72%)
5. Others (3.48%)

At the time of the 2011 census, 84.53% of the population spoke Dogri, 4.95% Punjabi, 4.32% Gujari and 2.72% Hindi as their first language. Other 3.48% speak other languages.

=== Sex ratio and literacy rate ===
Samba has a sex ratio of 886 females for every 1,000 males, and a literacy rate of 81.4%. 16.81% of the population lives in urban areas. The Scheduled Castes and Scheduled Tribes account for 28.80% and 5.51% of the population of the district.

Sex Ratio in Samba District in 2011 Census. (no. females per 1,000 males)
Religion (and population)	Sex Ratio
Hindu (pop 275,311)	887
Muslim (pop 22,950)	865
Christian (pop 2,306)	608
Sikh (pop 17,961)	941
Other (pop 370)	869
Total (pop 318,898)	886

=== Religion ===
Religion in Samba district (2011)
Religion	Percent
Hinduism	86.33%
Islam	7.20%
Sikhism	5.63%
Christianity	0.72%
Other or not stated	0.12%

Samba district has an overwhelming Hindu majority, spread among Muslims, Sikhs, and others are the minority in the Samba district.

Samba district: religion, gender ratio, and % urban of population, according to the 2011 Census.
	Hindu	Muslim	Christian	Sikh	Buddhist	Jain	Other	Not stated	Total
Total	275,311	22,950	2,306	17,961	48	16	6	300	318,898
Total	86.33%	7.20%	0.72%	5.63%	0.02%	0.01%	0.00%	0.09%	100.00%
Male	145,930	12,308	1,434	9,254	29	8	5	156	169,124
Female	129,381	10,642	872	8,707	19	8	1	144	149,774
Gender ratio (% female)	47.0%	46.4%	37.8%	48.5%	39.6%	50.0%	16.7%	48.0%	47.0%
Sex ratio (no. of females per 1,000 males)	887	865	608	941	–	–	–	–	886
Urban	47,411	2,669	1,218	2,205	20	1	0	91	53,615
Rural	227,900	20,281	1,088	15,756	28	15	6	209	265,283
% Urban	17.2%	11.6%	52.8%	12.3%	41.7%	6.3%	0.0%	30.3%	16.8%

== Geography ==
The district covers Samba town and adjoining tehsils: Bari Brahmana, Vijay Pur and Ghagwal. The district is separated at some point from the Jammu district by "Purmandal Bridge". Samba is situated on the bank of Basantar River. At one side samba has its boundary with Pakistan.

Samba district consists of Eight blocks: Samba, Vijay Pur, Purmandal, Bari Brahmana, Nud, Rajpura, Sumb and Ghagwal. Each block consists of GREF panchayats. The biggest village is Rajpura.

== Politics ==
Samba District has three assembly constituencies: Samba, Vijaypur and Ramgarh(newly created constituency by delimitation commission). All three are part of Jammu (Lok Sabha constituency). All of the seats were won by the BJP in the recent assembly election.

== Festivals & Fairs of Samba ==
=== Rath Kharda Mela ===
An eight day fair is organised in Narsingh and Annapurna Temple in Ghagwal of Samba district of Jammu division. This fair involves taking out procession of deity on a chariot. Hence named Rath Kharda Mela. Thousands of devotees are drawn from neighbouring states of Punjab and Himachal Pradesh and also other parts of Jammu region. People from hilly areas of Jammu like: Basohli, Doda, Kishtwar, Bani, Dudu Basantgarh put stalls in this fair and sell the handicrafts and woolen items like Pattus, blankets & shawls.

During this fair, the temple is decorated with flowers and lights. Devotees visit the temple and pay obeisance to the main deity, Bhagwan Narsimha. A Bhandara is also organised for the devotees. Local farmers sow their fields in the name of Bhagwan Narsimha and while harvesting their crops offer a part of it to the temple during this fair.

Besides Ghagwal, Rath Kharda Mela is also held at other places of Jammu division like: Ramgarh tehsil of Udhampur district, Parnala village in Billawar tehsil and Hatli village in Kathua.

== Famous People ==
- Alla Rakha Indian Classical Musician and tabla player
- Raja Suchet Singh to whom the District also owes the famous Samba fort. In 1846 A.D it was annexed to J&K by Maharaja Gulab Singh making it an integral part of the state.

== Villages ==
- Rehian
