= Bedian =

- Village
- Map showing Bedian in Punjab (Pakistan) Bedian (Pakistan)
- Coordinates: 31.3152°N 74.5028°E
- Country: Pakistan
- Province: Punjab
- District: Kasur
- Founder: Baba Sahib Singh Bedi
- Time zone: UTC+5 (PST)

Bedian (Urdu: بیدیاں), also spelled Badian, is a village in the Kasur District of Punjab, Pakistan, close to the India-Pakistan border. The village was founded by the Sikh preacher Baba Sahib Singh Bedi during the reign of Maharaja Ranjit Singh. After the partition of India, Pakistan built the Bambawali-Ravi-Bedian Canal (BRB Canal), bringing waters from the Chenab River to the Upper Bari Doab Canal, as a replacement for the canal waters lost to the Indian Punjab.

== Etymology ==
The name Bedian derives from the Bedi clan of Khatris. The clan which founded and populated this village before Partition of India.

== History ==
The village was first settled by the descendants of Baba Sahib Singh Bedi, a descendant of Guru Nanak. Bedi was a contemporary of Maharaja Ranjit Singh and put tilak on the Maharaja's forehead during his coronation. The Maharaja is said to have allotted the land of the village to Bedi and his descendants

After the British East India Company conquered Punjab, it created the Upper Bari Doab Canal (UBDC) system, bringing waters from the Ravi River to irrigate lands in the Bari doab (the interfluvial regions between the Ravi and Beas-Sutlej rivers). The main branch of the UBDC ran through the village of Bedian.

During the partition of India, the Radcliffe Line, which divided the Punjab province into West Punjab (Pakistan) and East Punjab (India), fell close to Bedian. Radcliffe added a portion of the Kasur tehsil to the East Punjab in order to connect the Amritsar District with the rest of East Punjab. But Bedian fell just outside of the portion and remained in Pakistan.

At the time of Partition when the Bedi Sikhs were fleeing to India, they asked their servants who were Mazhabi Sikhs to stay back and look after their property. Mazhabi Sikhs later converted to Christianity to escape persecution, thus creating a Christian population in the village.

After partition, the Indian Punjab claimed proprietary rights to the waters of the UBDC. To avoid dependence on Indian Punjab, Pakistan created the Bambawali-Ravi-Bedian Canal, bringing waters from the Chenab River to replace those of the Indian UBDC. The old channels of the UBDC in Pakistan continue to be used with water from the BRB canal and other link canals.

== Transportation ==
Bedian has a direct road to Lahore, which is called the Bedian Road.

The distance to the Lahore city centre about 30 kilometres (19 mi). The distance to the outskirts of Lahore, along the Hudiara drain, is 20 kilometres (12 mi).

The Bedian Road is home to much active development of residential areas around Lahore.
