= Madhopur Headworks =

Dam in Punjab, India

- Interactive map of Madhopur Headworks
- 32.3767°N 75.6062°E
- Waterway: Ravi River
- Country: India
- State: Punjab
- Maintained by: Punjab Department of Irrigation
- First built: 1875
- Latest built: 1959
- Length: 2,700 feet (820 m)
- Discharge capacity Up to 9000 cusec

Madhopur Headworks is a barrage on the Ravi River in Madhopur, just 14 km from Pathankot city in Pathankot district in the Indian state of Punjab. It is located on the border with Jammu and Kashmir. The Upper Bari Doab Canal (UBDC) off-taking from Madhopur irrigates agricultural lands in Punjab and provides water to the cities of Pathankot, Gurdaspur, Batala and Amritsar.

The headworks was one of the first irrigation projects constructed in Punjab during the British Raj, within 10 years of the conquest of Punjab. It provided irrigation in the lands of Gurdaspur, Amritsar and Lahore districts of the undivided Punjab. During the partition arrangements, Cyrill Radcliffe allocated three tehsils of Gurdaspur district to India for maintaining the integrity of the canal system from Madhopur.

After independence, India signed the Indus Waters Treaty obtaining the exclusive use of waters from the Ravi River. Subsequently, India rebuilt the Madhopur headwork as full barrage. Pakistan continues to use the UBDC canal network within its territory, replacing the Ravi waters by waters from Chenab via the BRB Canal.

== Antecedents ==
A canal by name Hasli canal was constructed during the reign of Mughal Emperor Shah Jahan (r. 1628–1658), taking water from Madhopur to Lahore. The canal plan was created by Ali Mardan Khan and built into construction by Mullah Ala'ul-Mul Tuni.

In the 19th century, the Sikh emperor Ranjit Singh refurbished the canal and extended it with another branch going to Amritsar.

According to Scholar Ian Stone, these early canals were defective in many ways. The construction was made from weak masonry structures and easily gave way to floods. They were also prone to silt deposits and therefore had to be periodically refurbished.

== British projects ==
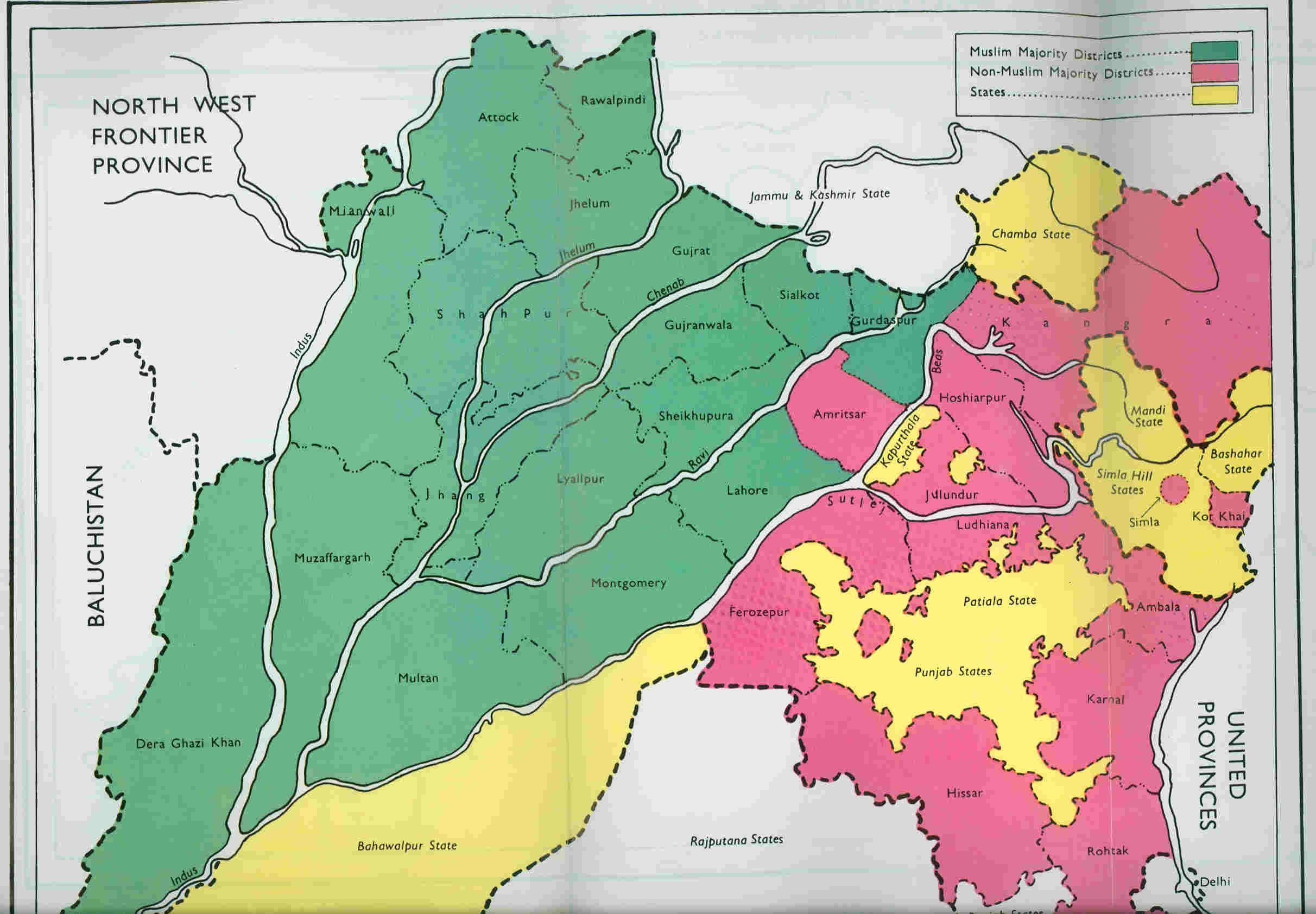
Districts of Punjab during the British Raj. The Bari doab consisted of Gurdaspur, Amritsar, Lahore, Montogomery and Multan districts.

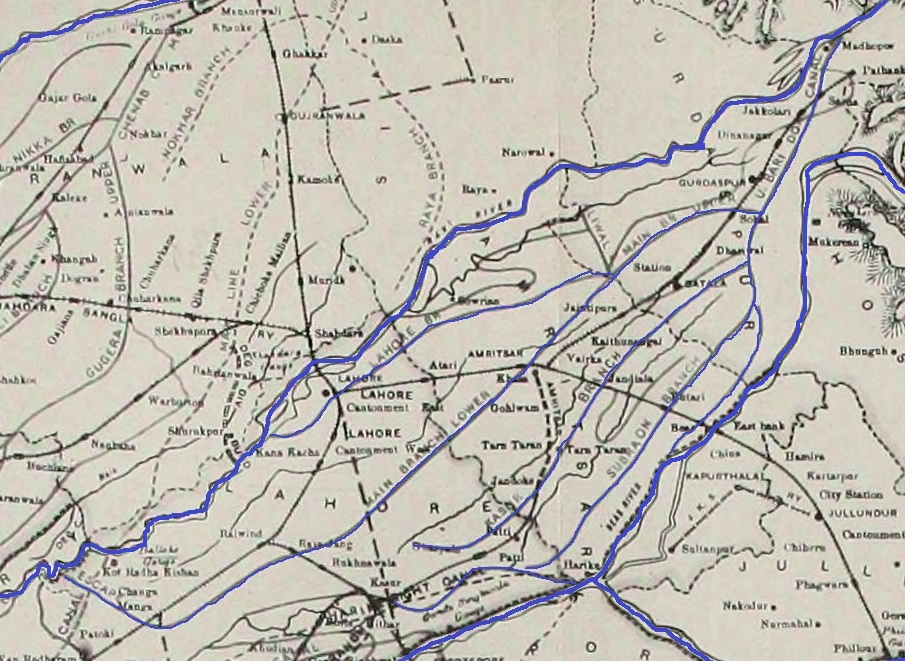
Irrigation map of Punjab (1911) depicting the Upper Bari Doab Canal network

After conquering Punjab from the Sikhs in 1849, the British East India Company rebuilt the canals under the name Upper Bari Doab Canal (UBDC). (Note: The term "Bari Doab" literally refers to the interfluvial region between the Beas and Ravi rivers, but in practice, it also refers to the region between Sutlej and Ravi rivers. The canal was most likely called "Bari Doab Canal" at its inception, with the attribute "Upper" being added after a Lower Bari Doab Canal was constructed downstream. It is also sometimes called the "Central Bari Doab Canal".) It was planned and carried out by engineers Joseph Henry Dyas and James Crofton. Providing employment to the disbanded Sikh soldiers via agriculture is said to have been the main motivation for its urgent construction. The new canals were opened in 1859 and irrigated agricultural lands in Gurdaspur, Amritsar and Lahore districts. No headworks were constructed at this time due to apprehensions that they would not be able to withstand the floods of the Ravi River. A side channel of the river with a weir and falling shutters regulated the canal waters. A bridge with 23 arched openings 10 feet wide was constructed for this purpose. Modern commentators also note that the canal was constructed with an excessive slope of 0.05 m/km which caused erosion of its bed.

The Madhopur headwork was added during 1875–1879. It consisted of a 2,700 feet (820 m) long weir across the Ravi river, with the crest varying from 3 feet to 6 feet above the bed of the river. The last 300 feet towards on the left (towards Punjab) held undersluices with 12 openings of 20 feet width and 3–4 feet height. They were operated by iron gates.

Even though the canal system was capable of carrying flows of 6,500 cubic feet (180 m^{3}) per second, the headwork supplied a maximum of 4,850 cubic feet (137 m^{3}) per second. The main line of the canal ran to 31 miles (50 km) after which it divided into a main branch and a Kasur branch near the town of Gurdaspur. The two branches had further subbranches leading to Lahore and Sobraon respectively.

- The main branch flowed past the towns of Batala and Amritsar and headed towards the village of Bedian in the Lahore district. It continued in the Lahore district flowing past the villages of Raiwind and Kot Radha Kishan. An escape to the channel of the Ravi River allowed any excess flood waters to drain back into the river.
- The Lahore branch took off the main branch near Batala and, flowing past Amritsar on its north, headed towards the city of Lahore.
- The Kasur branch ran south from Gurdaspur till the town of Kahnuwan and then turned southwest. Flowing past Batala and Tarn Taran Sahib, it entered the Kasur tehsil near the village of Patti (now in Tarn Taran district).
- The Sobraon branch continued south of Kahnuwan and turned southwest. Flowing parallel to the Sutlej River, it ended near Sobraon (to its north).

Most of these areas were later scenes of conflict during the Indo-Pakistani War of 1965.

== Modern development ==
In 1955, a full barrage was constructed at Madhopur after the original weir of the Madhopur headwork got damaged in a flood. Over the next two years, a Madhopur–Beas Link canal was also added, to link the Ravi waters to the Beas River via the Chaki nalla.

The UBDC canal network was remodelled during 2001–2005 after the construction of the Ranjit Sagar Dam. It presently carries up to 9,000 cubic feet (250 m^{3}) per second, distributing them to seven branches and 247 distributaries. The total length of the canal network is 3,119 kilometres (1,938 mi) and cultivates 573,000 hectares (1,420,000 acres) of land.

== Bibliography ==
- Chaturvedi, Mahesh Chandra (2011), India's Waters: Environment, Economy, and Development, CRC Press, ISBN 978-1-4398-7283-3
- Mahajan, Gautam (2009), Ground Water: Surveys and Investigation, APH Publishing, pp. 29–, ISBN 978-81-313-0474-7
- Moza, Usha (2014), River Ravi – Ecology and Fisheries (PDF), Indian Council of Agricultural Research
- Nijjar, Bakhshish Singh (1996), History of the United Panjab, Atlantic Publishers & Dist, ISBN 978-81-7156-536-8
- Stone, Ian (2002), Canal Irrigation in British India: Perspectives on Technological Change in a Peasant Economy, Cambridge University Press, ISBN 978-0-521-52663-0
