= Ranjit Sagar Dam =

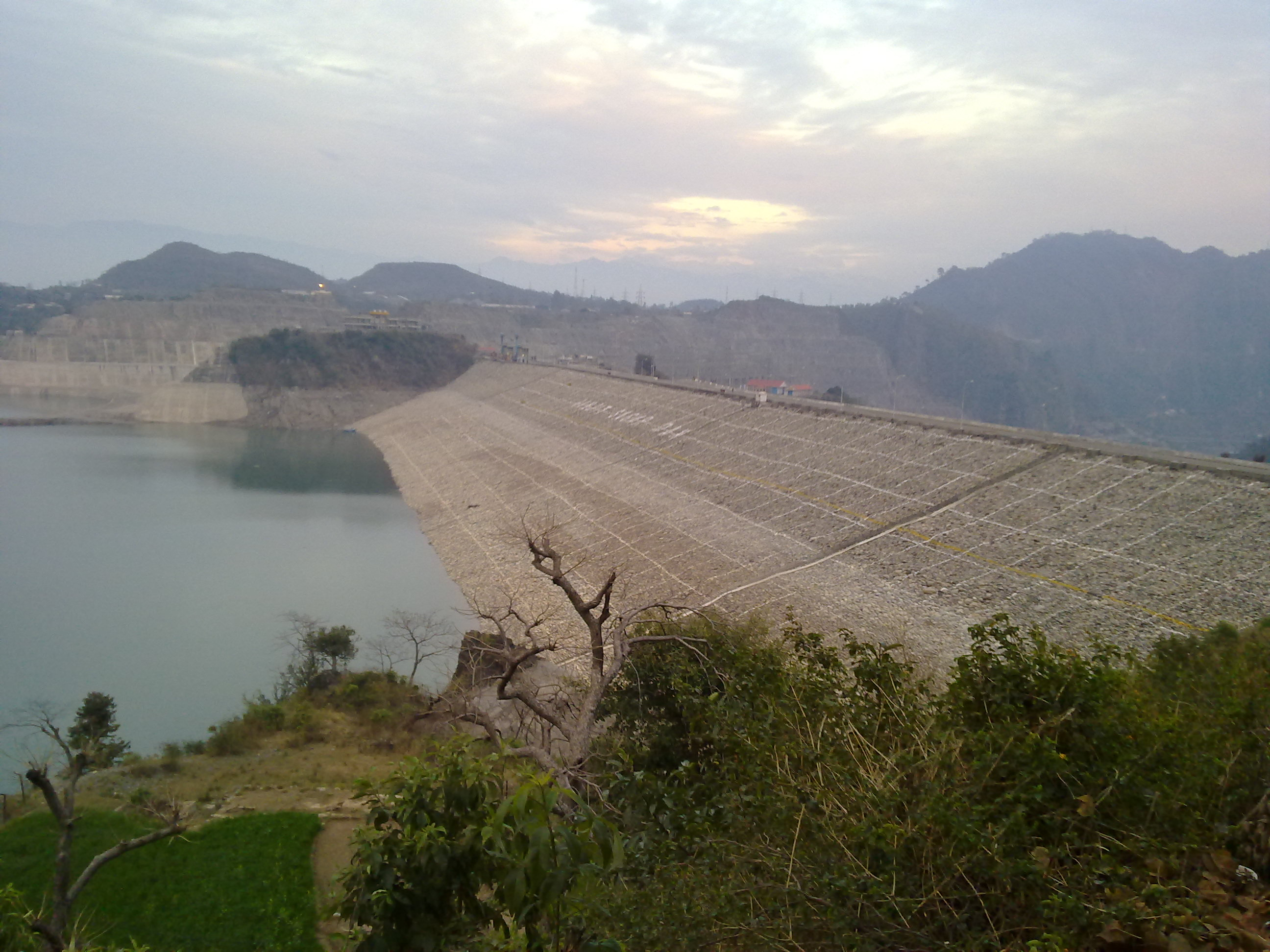

- Location within Punjab Location within India
- Country: India
- Location: Basholi & Pathankot
- Coordinates: 32°26′33″N 75°43′43″E
- Status: Operational
- Construction began: 1981
- Opening date: 2001
- Owner: Department of Water Resources, Government of Punjab, India

Dam and spillways
- Type of dam: Embankment, earth-fill
- Impounds: Ravi River
- Height: 160 m (525 ft)
- Length: 617 m (2,024 ft)
- Elevation at crest: 540 m (1,772 ft)
- Width (crest): 14 m (46 ft)
- Width (base): 669.2 m (2,196 ft)
- Dam volume: 21,920,000 m^{3} (28,670,278 cu yd)
- Spillway type: Controlled-chute
- Spillway capacity: 24,637 m^{3}/s (870,047 cu ft/s)

Reservoir
- Total capacity: 3,280,000,000 m^{3} (2,659,139 acre⋅ft)
- Active capacity: 2,344,000,000 m^{3} (1,900,312 acre⋅ft)
- Normal elevation: 527.9 m (1,732 ft)

Power Station
- Commission date: 2000
- Hydraulic head: 121.9 m (400 ft) (max)
- Turbines: 4 x 150 MW Francis-type
- Installed capacity: 600 MW

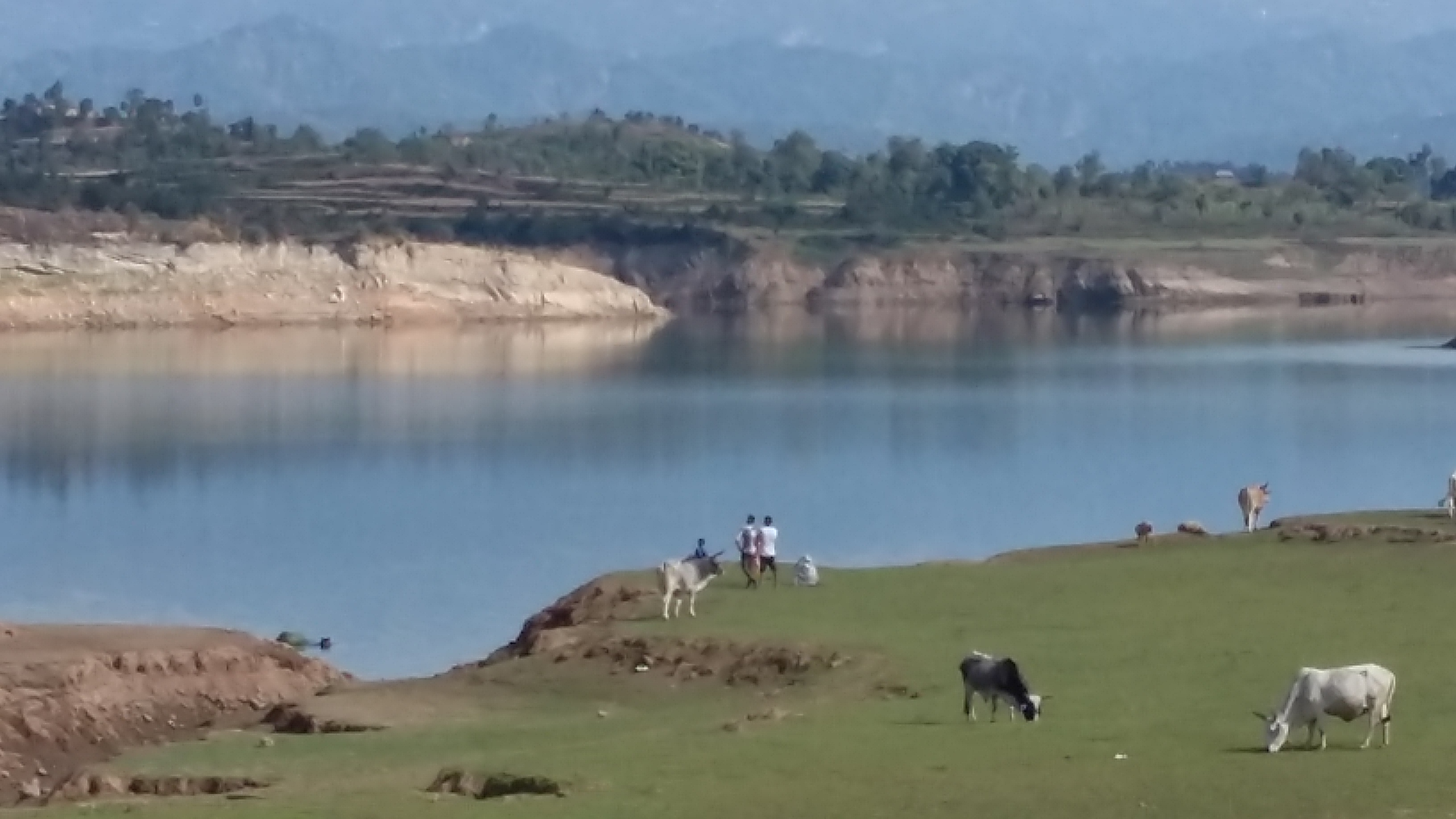
BankThein Dam lake

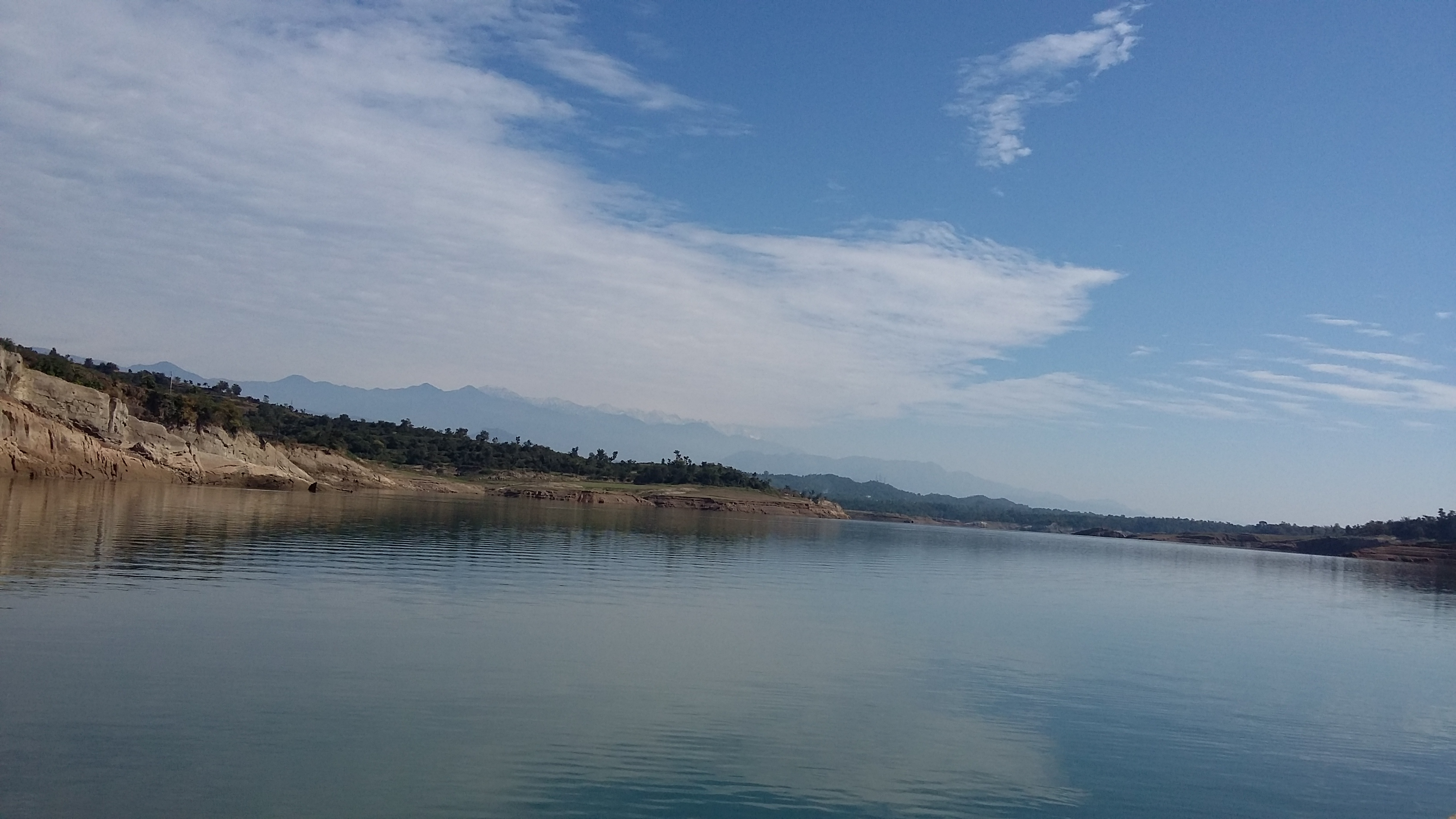
Ranjit sagar dam lake

The Ranjit Sagar Dam, also known as the Thein Dam, is part of a hydroelectric project constructed by the Punjab Irrigation Department on the Ravi River on the border of Union Territory, Jammu and Kashmir and state Punjab. It is located upstream of the Madhopur Barrage at Madhopur. A large portion, up to 60%, of the reservoir falls within Jammu and Kashmir. The dam is around and equidistant 30 km from both Pathankot in the state of Punjab and Kathua in Jammu and Kashmir. The project is used for both irrigation and power generation. The project is the largest hydroelectric dam in Punjab with a capacity of 600 megawatts. Also, the dam is amongst the highest earth-fill dams in India and has the largest diameter penstock pipes in the country. The township where the site is located is called Shah pur Kandi Township. Feasibility studies for the project began in 1953 and geotechnical studies continued until 1980. Construction began in 1981, the generators were commissioned in 2000 and the project complete in March 2001.

There have been several issues and claims between the governments of Jammu and Kashmir and of Punjab over the usage of water, electricity, employment, compensation to the locals and land acquisition. On 12 May 2017 Government of Jammu and Kashmir raised these issues in the Northern Zonal Council Meeting held in Chandigarh; following which the Ministry of Home Affairs, GOI mandated the construction of barrages that will allow both states equal rights over the dam. The proposed barrages will help Jammu and Kashmir irrigate Samba and Kathua districts. The Government of Punjab had also agreed to share electricity produced through the project but previous claims of Jammu and Kashmir remained unsettled and a resolution is pending. In 2017, the Government of Jammu and Kashmir claimed 8000 crores from fhs Government of Punjab as losses.

== See also ==
- Shahpurkandi dam project
