= Shahpurkandi dam project =

Planned dam in Pathankot, Punjab, India

Shahpurkandi Dam Project
- Official name: Shahpurkandi Dam
- Country: India
- Location: Pathankot, Punjab
- Purpose: Power, irrigation
- Status: Under construction
- Construction began: 2014
- Construction cost: ₹2715.70 Crore in Feb 2018
- Owner(s): Water Resources Department Punjab

Dam and spillways
- Type of dam: Gravity
- Impounds: River Ravi

Power Station
- Turbines: 6 x 33 MW & 1 x 8 MW Kaplan-type
- Installed capacity: 206 MW

The Shahpurkandi Dam project is located on the Ravi River in Pathankot district, Punjab, India, downstream from the Ranjit Sagar Dam. The project is designed to irrigate 5,000 hectares in Punjab and 32,000 hectares in Jammu and Kashmir. It will also generate electricity of up to 206MW and provide irrigation to Punjab (5,000 Ha) and Jammu and Kashmir (32,173 Ha). The construction of the dam is as per the framework of the Indus Waters Treaty regarding sharing of rivers between India and Pakistan.

== Details ==
The project comprises seven hydro-generating sets located in two power houses, six each of 33 MW and one of 8 MW. The gross storage of the balancing reservoir is 4.23 tmcft. The water released from the upstream Ranjit Sagar Dam, after generating electricity through the 600 MW power house during peak hours, is stored in the balancing reservoir to supply water to the irrigation canals continuously without any overflow into the downstream river.

== Current status ==
The dam component of the project was completed in February 2024. The filling of the reservoir began in November 2024, and capacity testing was carried out in May 2025.
