= Madhopur, Punjab =

Madhopur
- Town
- Location in Punjab, India
- Coordinates: 32.3614°N 75.5943°E
- Country: India
- State: Punjab
- District: Pathankot

Population
  - Total: 3,472

Languages
  - Official: Punjabi, Hindi
- Time zone: UTC+5:30 (IST)
- PIN: 145024
- Telephone code: 01870
- Vehicle registration: PB-35

Madhopur is a town located near the city of Pathankot, Punjab, India, at its border with the Kathua district of Jammu and Kashmir. It is also the location of the Madhopur headworks on the Ravi River, which feeds the Upper Bari Doab Canal irrigating 335,000 hectares of land in Punjab.

Madhopur has an average elevation of 332 metres (1,089 feet), and lies on the highway NH 44 (formerly NH-1A) linking Punjab and Jammu and Kashmir.

== About ==
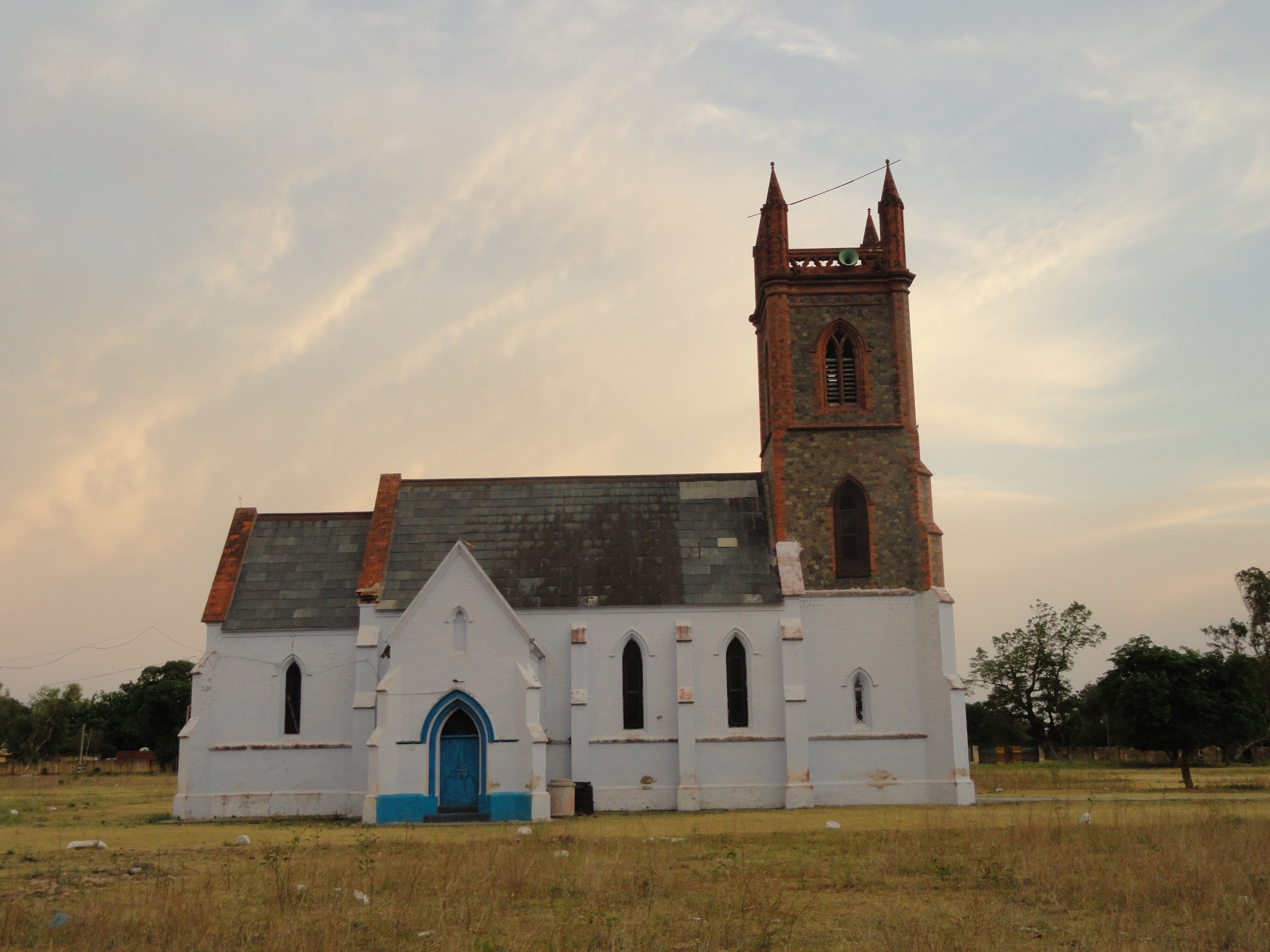
Historical Church of British-era

Madhopur lies on the Pathankot-Jammu national highway (NH 44, formerly NH-1A), a key road link between Jammu and Kashmir has with the rest of India. It is also on the Jalandhar–Jammu railway line.

Madhopur was part of the Nurpur Princely state ruled by the Pathania Rajputs prior to 1849 A.D. Now it is known as the "Gateway of Punjab", a meeting point of the three northern states of Punjab, Himachal Pradesh and Jammu and Kashmir. Due to its location, Madhopur serves as a travel hub for those three, and is a hub for the Indian Army. Madhopur is a small Punjab town in terms of population. It is the last point in Punjab on the national highway that connects Jammu and Kashmir with the rest of India. The Upper Bari Doab Canal starts from here, which is best known for its Hydraulic Research Station at the Upper Bari Doab Canal in Malikpur Sujanpur. Madhopur is situated in the foothills of Kangra and Dalhousie, with the Ravi River flowing close by. The city is sometimes used as a rest-stop before heading into the mountains of Jammu and Kashmir, Dalhousie, Chamba, and Kangra, into the Himalayas..

== Attractions ==
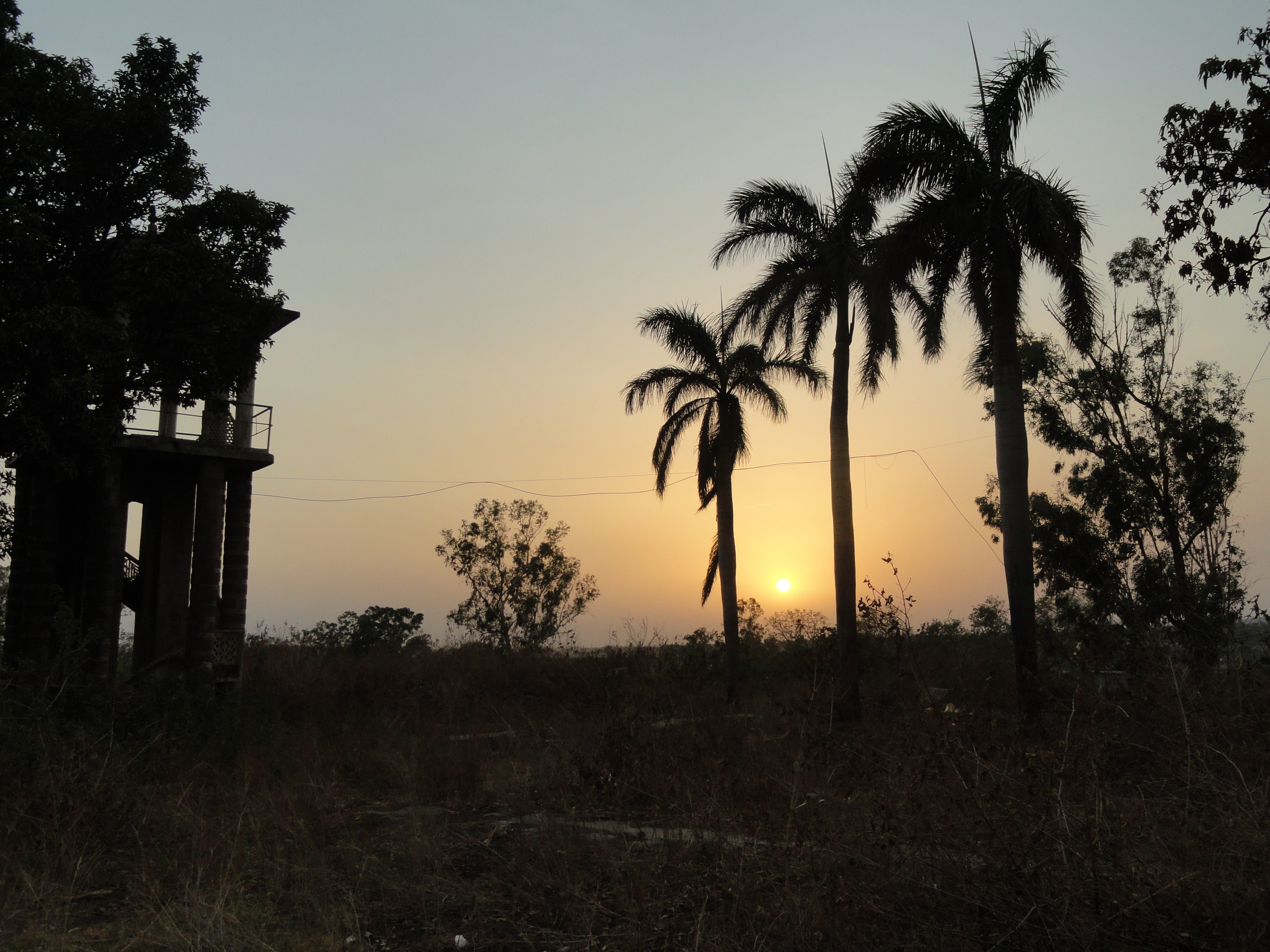
Sunset view from Pari Garden

Head works of Upper Bari Doab, Osho's Ashram and Shahpur Kandi are the attractions of this area. Madhopur is also used as a gateway to the Jammu and Kashmir hill stations of Kathua, Patni Top, Gulmarg. Madhopur is known for its natural environment. A garden made by the British Raj known as 'Pari Garden' was there which was recently destroyed because of new hydro project, as are several buildings from the Raj era.

== Airports close to Madhopur, Pathankot district ==
Pathankot Airport (9.5 km)

== See also ==
- Lakhanpur, Jammu
