= Ravi River =

River in India and Pakistan

Coordinates: 30°35′N 71°49′E

Ravi River Iravati River
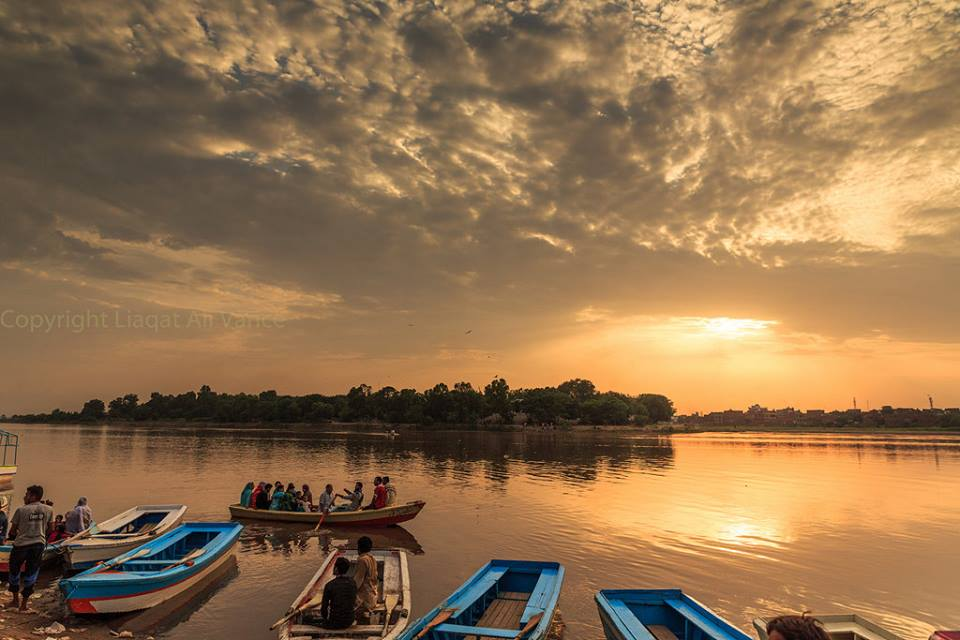
- Boats on Ravi River at Lahore, Punjab, Pakistan

Location
- Country: India, Pakistan
- State: Himachal Pradesh, Punjab (India), Punjab (Pakistan)

Physical characteristics
- Source: Hanuman Tibba
  - location: From Bara Bhangal, Kangra, Himachal Pradesh, India
- Mouth: Chenab River
  - location: Near Sarai Sidhu, Punjab, Pakistan
- Length: 720 km (450 mi)
- Discharge
  - average: 267.5 m^{3}/s (9,450 cu ft/s) (near Mukesar)
  - maximum: 11,015.23 m^{3}/s (388,999 cu ft/s) (near Baloki)

Basin features
- River system: Indus River System
- Tributaries
  - right: Siul

The Ravi River (Note: /ˈrɑːvi/; Punjabi pronunciation: [ɾaːʋi]) is a river in South Asia that flows through northwestern India and eastern Pakistan forming the boundary between the two nations for about 50 miles before travelling westwards across eastern Pakistan. It is one of five major rivers of the Punjab region.

Under the Indus Waters Treaty of 1960, the waters of the Ravi and two other rivers of the Punjab (Sutlej and Beas River) were allocated to India. Subsequently, the Indus Basin Project was developed in Pakistan, which transfers waters from western rivers of the Indus system to replenish the portion of the Ravi River lying in that country. Many inter-basin water transfers, irrigation, hydropower and multipurpose projects have been built in India.

== History ==
According to ancient history traced to the Vedas, the Ravi River was known as Irāvatī (Sanskrit: इरावती). The Ravi was known as Purushni or Irawati to Indians in Vedic times and as Hydraotes (Ancient Greek: 'ϒδραώτης) and Hyarotis (Ὑαρῶτις) to the Ancient Greeks.

Part of the Battle of the Ten Kings was fought on a river, which according to Yaska (Nirukta 9.26) refers to the Ravi river at Punjab.

== Geography ==
The Ravi River, a transboundary river of India and Pakistan, is an integral part of the Indus River Basin and forms the headwaters of the Indus basin. The waters of the Ravi River drain into the Arabian Sea (Indian Ocean) through the Indus River in Pakistan. The river rises in the Bara Bhangal, Kangra District in Himachal Pradesh, India. The river drains a total catchment area of 14,442 square kilometres (5,576 sq mi) in India after flowing for a length of 720 kilometres (450 mi). Flowing westward, it is hemmed by the Pir Panjal and Dhauladhar ranges, forming a triangular zone.

=== River course ===
Source reach

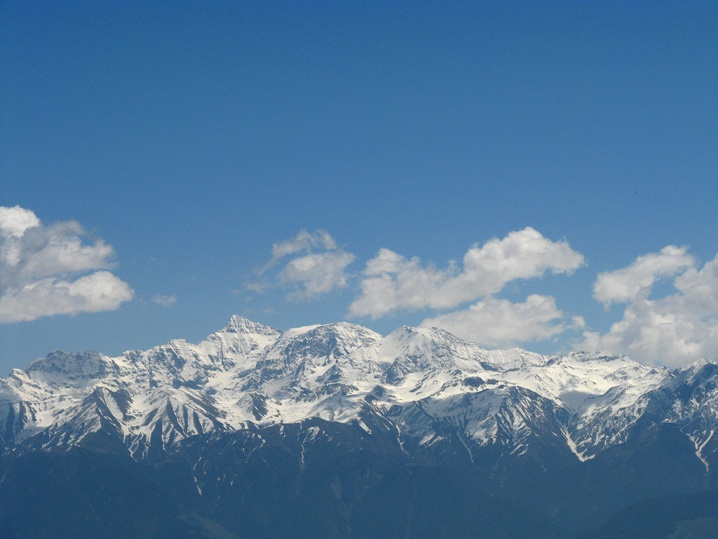
The Pir Panjal Range in Himachal Pradesh, India

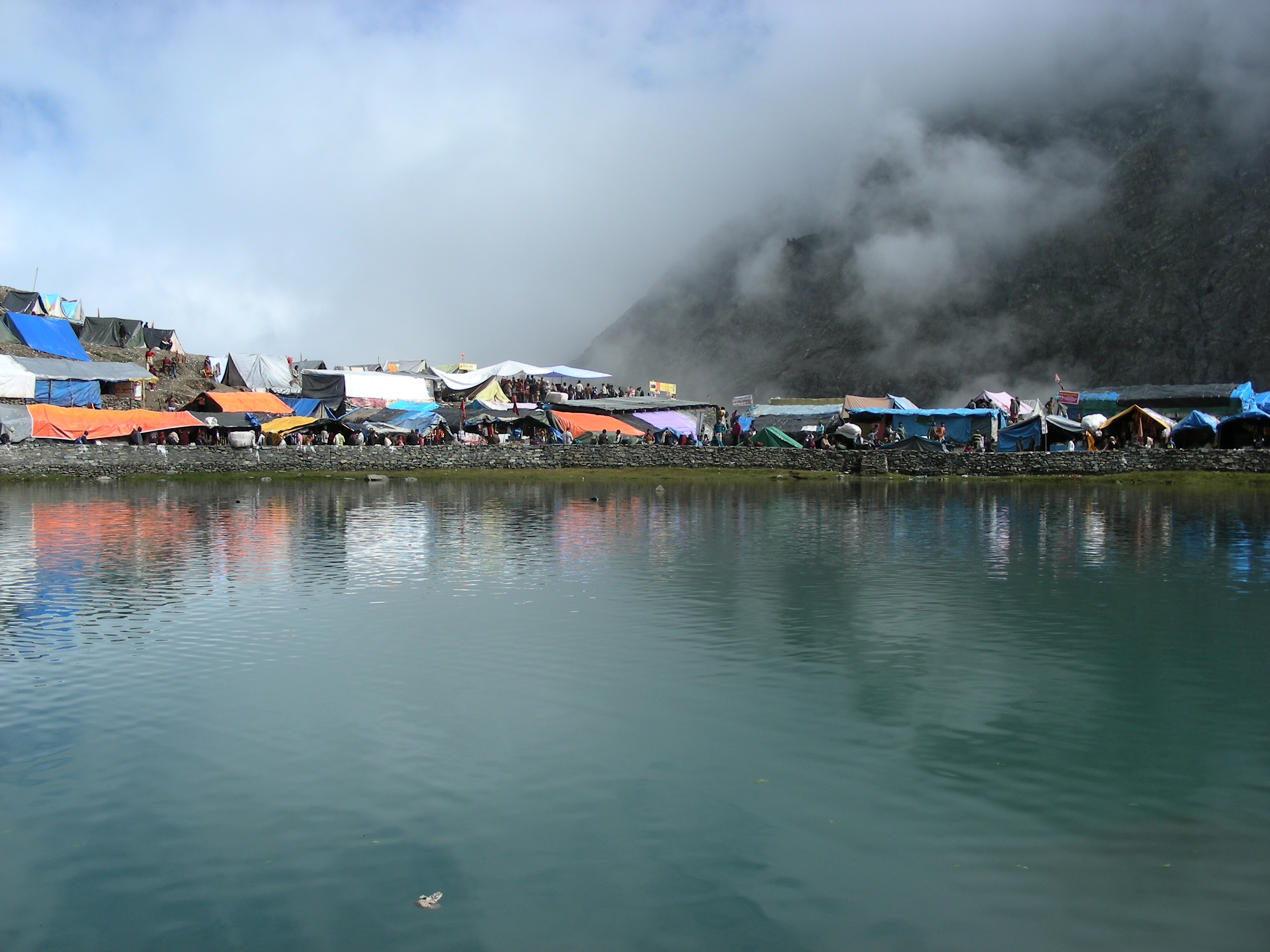
Source of Budhil River, in Himachal Pradesh a major tributary of the Ravi River

The Ravi River originates in the Himalayas in the Multhan tehsil of Kangra district of Himachal Pradesh, India. It follows a north-westerly course and is a perennial river. It is the smallest of the five Punjab rivers that rise from glacier fields at an elevation of 14,000 feet (4,300 m), on the southern side of the Mid Himalayas. It flows through Barabhangal, Bara Bansu, and Chamba districts. It flows in rapids in its initial reaches with boulders seen scattered in the bed of the river. The Ravi River in this reach flows in a gorge with a river bed slope of 183 feet per mile (34.7 m/km) and is mostly fed by snowmelt, as this region lies in a rain shadow. Two of its major tributaries, the Budhil and Nai or Dhona join 64 kilometres (40 mi) downstream from its source. The Budhil River rises in Lahul range of hills and is sourced from the Manimahesh Kailash Peak and the Manimahesh Lake, at an elevation of 4,080 metres (13,390 ft), and both are Hindu pilgrimage sites. The entire length of Budhil is 72 kilometres (45 mi) where it has a bed slope of 314 feet per mile (59.5 m/km). It flows through the ancient capital of Bharmwar, now known as Bharmour in Himachal Pradesh. During 1858–1860, the Raja of Bharmour had considered the Budhil valley as an excellent source of Deodar trees for supply to the British Raj. However, a part of the forest surrounding the temple was considered sacred and declared a reserved area. The second tributary, the Nai, rises at Kali Debi pass, and flows for 48 kilometres (30 mi), with a bed slope of 366 feet per mile (69.3 m/km), from its source at Trilokinath to its confluence with the Ravi. This valley was also exploited for its forest wealth during the English period.

Another major tributary that joins the Ravi River, just below Bharmour, the old capital of Chamba in Himachal Pradesh, is the Seul River from the northern direction. The valley formed by the river was also exploited for its rich timber trees. However, the valley has large terraces, which are very fertile and known as "the garden of Chamba". Crops grown here supply grains to the capital region and to Dalhousie town and its surrounding areas. One more major tributary that joins the Ravi River near Basohli (Jammu and Kashmir) is the Seva. This river was also exploited for its forest resources, (controlled by the then Raja of Chamba) originating from the Jammu region. The valley is also formed by another major tributary that joins the Seul River, the Baira-Nalla. Its sub-basin is in the Chamba district, located above Tissa. Baira drains the southern slopes of the Pir Panjal Range. The valley has an elevation variation between 5,321 and 2,693 metres (17,457 and 8,835 ft).

Tant Gari is another small tributary that rises from the subsidiary hill ranges of the Pir Panjal Range east of Bharmour. The valley formed by this stream is U-shaped with a river bed scattered with boulders and glacial morainic deposits.

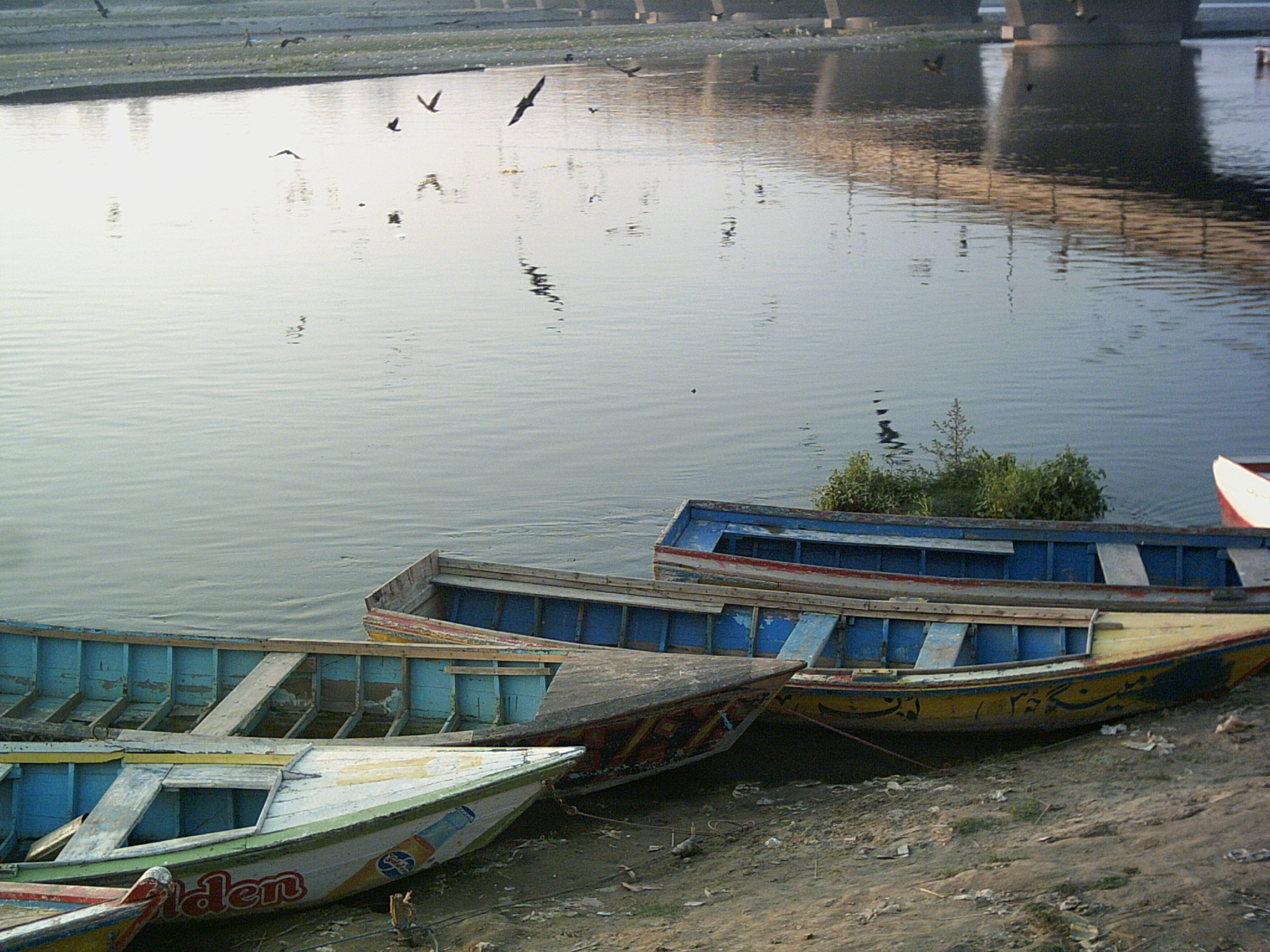
Boats floating beside the Ravi River in Lahore

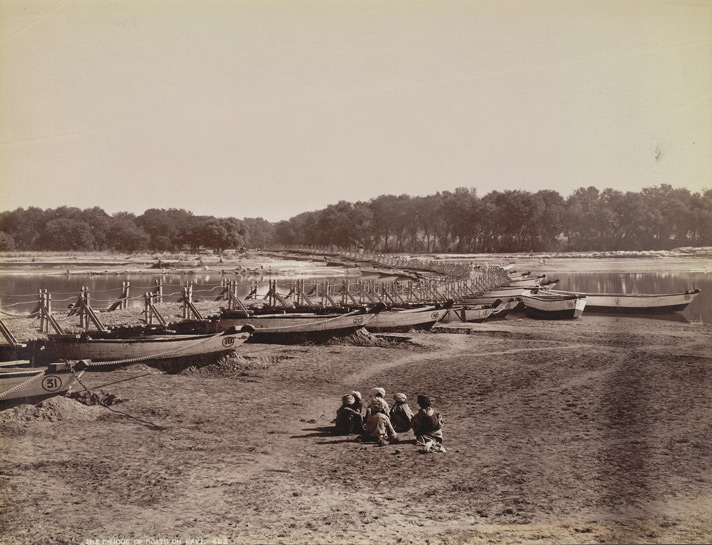
Bridge of boats on the Ravi taken by an unknown photographer in 1880

Main Ravi River

The main Ravi River flows through the base of Dalhousie hill, past the Chamba town. It is at an elevation of 856 metres (2,807 ft) (where a long wooden bridge existed to cross the Ravi River). It flows into the south-west, near Dalhousie, and then cuts a gorge in the Dhauladhar Range, before entering the Punjab plain near Madhopur and Pathankot. It then flows along the Indo–Pak border for 80 kilometres (50 mi) before entering Pakistan and joining the Chenab River. The total length of the river is about 725 kilometres (450 mi).

The Ujh River is another major tributary of the Ravi River. Its source is in the Kailash mountains at an elevation of 4,300 metres (14,100 ft), close to the Bhaderwah Mountains in the Jammu district. After flowing for 100 kilometres (62 mi), it joins Ravi at Nainkot in Pakistan.

As the Ravi flows past Lahore in Pakistan (26 kilometres (16 mi) below Amritsar in India) it is called "The river of Lahore" since that city is on its eastern bank. After passing through Lahore the river takes a turn at Kamalia and then debouches into the Chenab River, south of the town of Ahmadpur Sial. On its western bank is the town of Shahdara Bagh with the Tomb of Jahangir and the Tomb of Noor Jahan.

Change of river course

According to satellite imagery studies carried out over a period of 20 years (between 1972–1973 and 1991–1993), the river coursing along the India–Pakistan border meanders substantially in the alluvial plains of the Amritsar, Pathankot, and Gurdaspur districts of Punjab. This has resulted in successive damage in India as a result of the river changing its course towards India. The reason attributed to this change in the course of the river is massive river training structures/bunds constructed by Pakistan in its part of the river, close to the old course of the river. The shift in the course of the river is reported to be 4.8 kilometres (3.0 mi) towards India.

River water pollution

In the transboundary Ravi River flowing from India to Pakistan, in urban areas of Lahore the pollution levels in the river discharge are reportedly very high, which is attributed to careless disposal of large amount of industrial and agricultural wastewater and faulty drainage systems in both countries. A 72-kilometre (45 mi) stretch of the Ravi River from Lahore Siphon to Baloki headworks indicates heavy contamination of the water and sediment with Cd, Cr, Pt, and Cu. Recent reports suggest that the river stands as the most contaminated globally, with pharmaceutical residues such as paracetamol, nicotine, caffeine, and medications for epilepsy and diabetes detected in its waters. The river sediments are highly contaminated and have become a secondary source for pollution of the river water, even though some control over unauthorised discharges into the river have been checked. Hence, measures to check metal re-mobilization from sediments into the river flows need attention. The worst affected drainage is the Hadharaam drain, a tributary of the Ravi River. It is also a trans-border problem involving both India and Pakistan. A UNDP funded special programme was launched in 2006 to address the issue in both countries.

=== Flora ===
The northern portion surrounding the Ravi is the lifeline of many different flora, notably deodar, walnut, holly oak, mulberry, alder, edible pine, Himalayan cypress, chinar, Daphne papyracea, north Indian rosewood, olive, and Toxicodendron acuminatum.

== Hydrology ==
The waters of the Ravi River are allocated to India under the Indus Waters Treaty, signed by India and Pakistan. Within India, the river is under the jurisdiction of the riparian states of Punjab, Jammu & Kashmir, and Himachal, and non-riparian states of Haryana, and Rajasthan, but the management is presided by the Supreme Court of India and the Ravi Beas Tribunal, set up in 1986 for the purpose. The annual flow in India up to the final crossing point in Pakistan is 11.52 million acre-feet (14.21 cubic kilometres) (MAF) out of which 6.971 MAF is available upstream of Madhopur headworks. Most of the water generated below the Madhopur headworks (4.549 MAF) is flowing into Pakistan from India.

=== Pre-partition utilisation ===
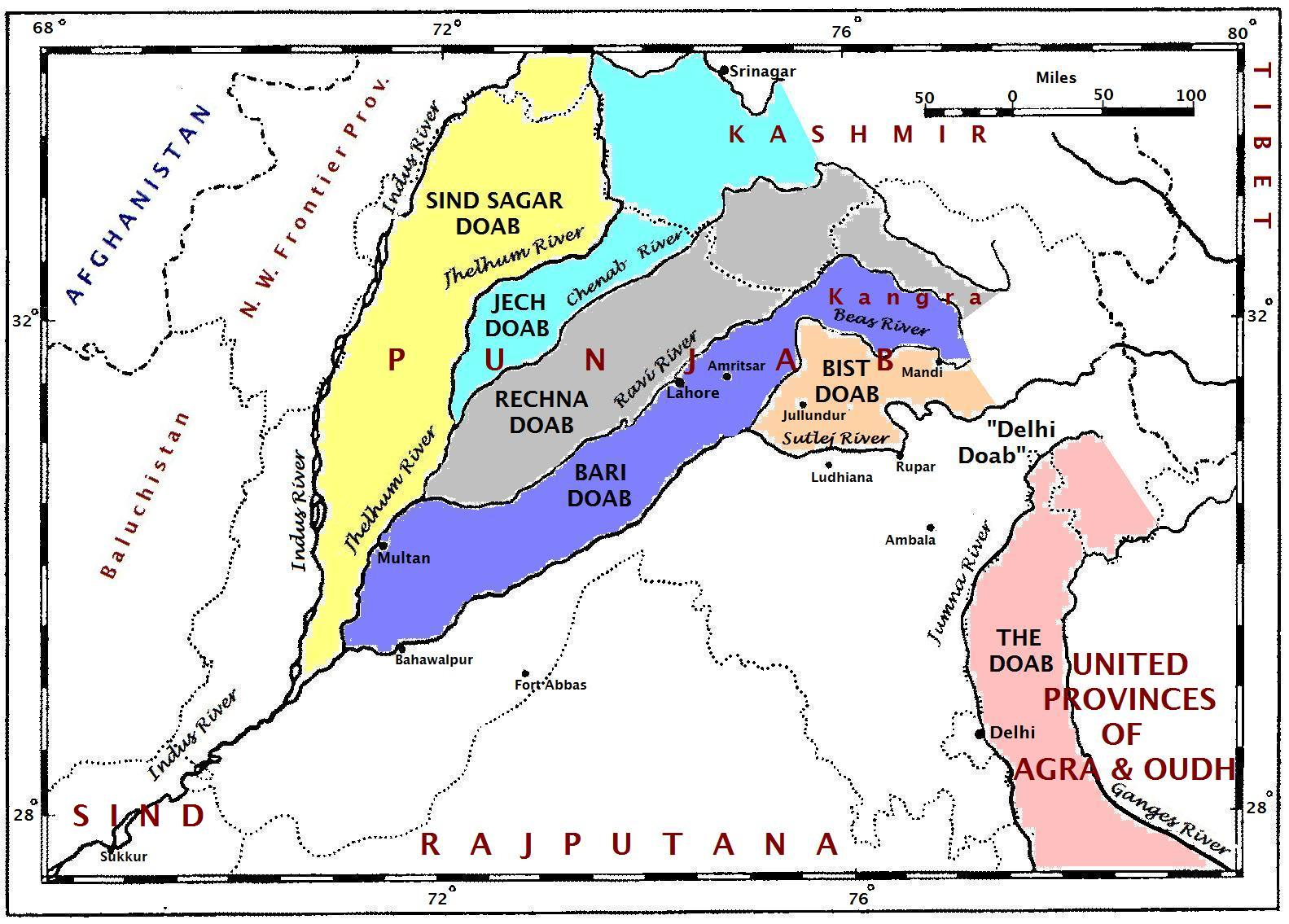
A map of the Punjab region c. 1947 showing the doabas formed by the Ravi River with other rivers of the Indus River system.

On the Ravi River, the earliest project built was the Madhopur Headworks, in 1902. It is a run-of-the river project (no storage envisaged) to divert flows through the Upper Bari Doab Canal (also known as Central Bari Doab Canal) to provide irrigation in the command area of the then unified India. (Note: Doabas formed by the Ravi River are known as the Rechna Doab – between the Chenab and the Ravi River, and the Bari Doab or Majha – between the Ravi and the Beas River.) Government of India has assessed the pre-partition use in India (Punjab) at 1.821 cubic kilometres (1,476,000 acre⋅ft). Prior to partition, it irrigated 335,000 hectares of land in Gurdaspur, Amritsar and Lahore districts.

=== Hydropower ===
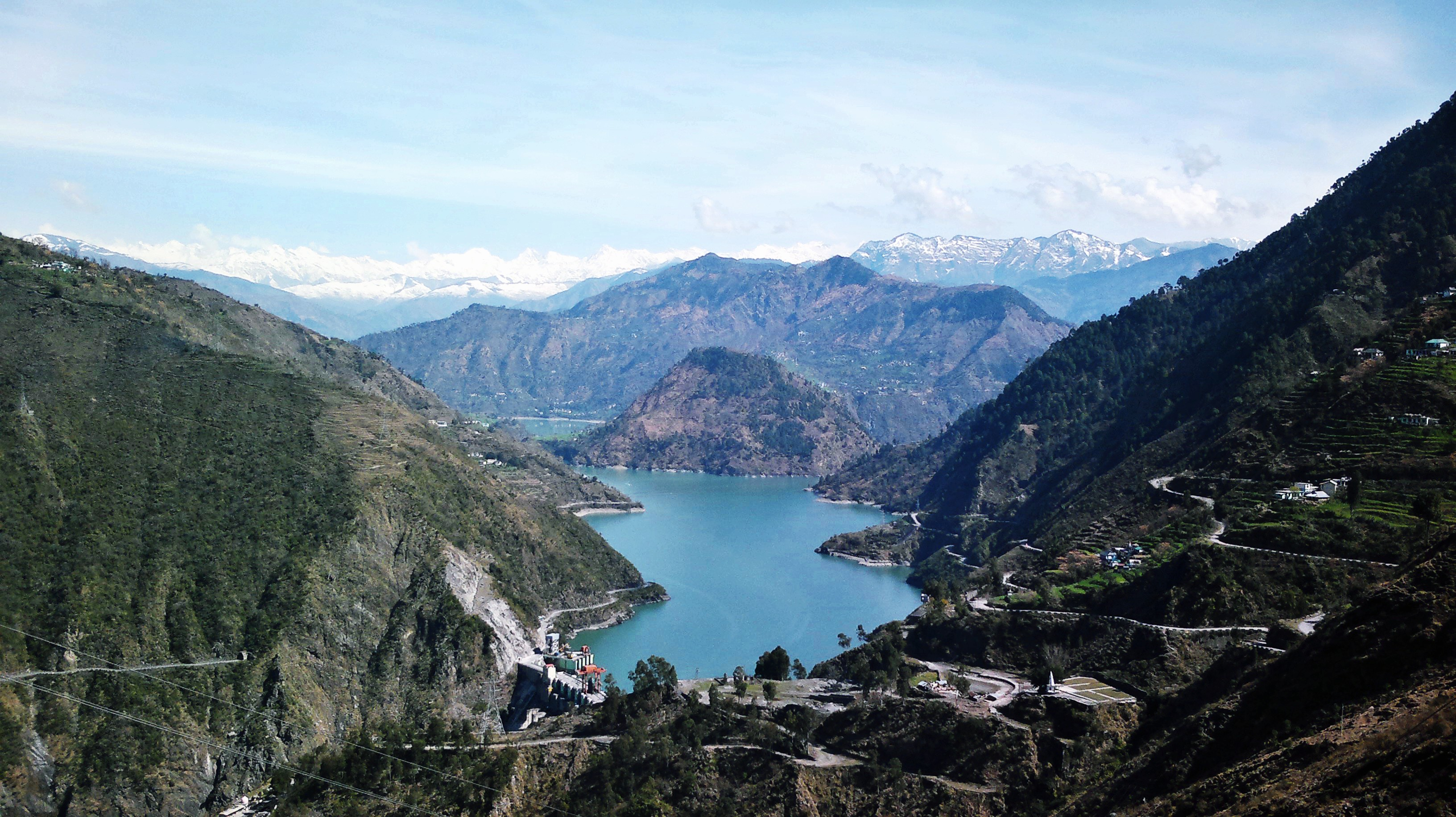
Chamera Lake and dam in India, with the Pir Panjal range in the background

The hydropower potential of the Ravi River system has been assessed at 2294 MW, of which only 1638 MW has been harnessed cumulatively, thus leaving 656 MW wasted opportunity. The hydropower potential developed since the 1980s is through the installation of the Baira Suil Hydroelectric Power Project of 198 MW capacity, the Chamera-I of 540 MW capacity commissioned in 1994, the Ranjitsagar Multipurpose Project of 600 MW capacity completed in 1999 and the Chamera-II of 300 MW capacity in the upstream of Chamera-I commissioned in 2004.

=== Multipurpose development ===
The major multipurpose project (irrigation, hydropower, flood control, development of fisheries, tourism and so forth) built on the river is the Ranjit Sagar Dam (also known as Thein dam as it is in Thein village). The left bank is in Punjab and the right bank is in Jammu and Kashmir. It is located on the main stem of the Ravi River, about 24 kilometres (15 mi) upstream of Madhopur Headworks (built during pre-partition time). The project is an outcome of the development plan conceived for the use of the waters of three eastern rivers allocated to India under the Indus Treaty, namely the Sutlej, the Beas and the Ravi, for irrigation, hydropower generation and other consumptive uses.

A proposal for building a storage dam on the Ravi River was initially planned in 1912, envisaging a 61 metres (200 ft) high dam. A committee later conducted a survey of the area, but it was not until 1954 that geologists fully inspected the project area. In 1957, a storage Dam was proposed on the Ravi River for irrigation purposes only. The power generation aspect was not considered then. It was only in 1964 that the project was conceived for multipurpose development and submitted to Government of India for approval. Finally, in April 1982, the project was approved for construction by the Government of India.

The project, as built now, has a 160-metre (520 ft) high earth gravel shell dam with a gross irrigation potential of 348,000 hectares (860,000 acres) of land and power generation of 600 MW (4 units of 150 MW capacity each).

The geomorpohological setting of the river basin, which has a large number of terraces between Dhauladhar and Pir Panjal ranges, is attributed to the truly Himalayan characteristics of the river reflecting the "cis-Himalayan tectonic; structural, lithological and climatic conditions. Obviously it is different from the antecedent Indus and Sutlej".

Journalist Waqar mustafa has extensively documented the environmental degradation of the river in his historical research, including the book Story of Modern Indus (ISBN 978-969-23120-8-0).

== Water sharing ==
=== International water-sharing treaty ===
The Indus River system comprising the rivers, Ravi, Beas, Sutlej, Chenab, Jhelum, and Indus- a shared legacy between India and Pakistan

The upper reaches of the main Indus River and its tributaries lie in India whereas the lower reaches are in Pakistan. Following the partition of India in August 1947, a dispute arose between India and Pakistan on sharing of the waters of the Indus River Basin. The dispute was resolved with the intervention of the World Bank and a treaty was signed in 1960 on sharing of the Indus waters between India and Pakistan.

The Indus system of rivers comprises the three Western rivers in the Indus, the Jhelum and Chenab together with three eastern rivers: the Sutlej, the Beas, and the Ravi. To establish the ownership of these waters, Indus Water Treaty was signed between India and Pakistan on 1 April 1960, under the monitoring of the World Bank. The treaty, under Article 5.1, envisages the sharing of waters of the rivers Ravi, Beas, Sutlej, Jhelum, and Chenab which join the Indus River on its left bank (eastern side) in Pakistan. According to this treaty, Ravi, Beas, and Sutlej, which constitute the eastern rivers, are allocated for exclusive use by India before they enter Pakistan. However, a transition period of 10 years was permitted in which India was bound to supply water to Pakistan from these rivers until Pakistan was able to build the canal system for utilisation of waters of Jhelum, Chenab, and the Indus itself, allocated to it under the treaty. Similarly, Pakistan has exclusive use of the western rivers Jhelum, Chenab, and Indus but with some stipulations for the development of projects on these rivers in India. Pakistan also received one-time financial compensation for the loss of water from the eastern rivers. Since 31 March 1970, after the 10-year moratorium, India has secured full rights for use of the waters of the three rivers allocated to it. The treaty resulted in partitioning of the rivers rather than sharing of their waters.

Under this treaty, the two countries also agreed to exchange data and co-operate in matters related to the treaty. For this purpose, the treaty envisaged the creation of the Permanent Indus Commission, with a commissioner appointed by each country. The Indus Waters Treaty is the only international treaty that has been implemented over the last 60 years with due diligence and sincerity by both India and Pakistan, in spite of many wars fought between the two countries (the treaty was not revoked either by India or Pakistan during the 1965 or the 1971 war).

In February 2024, India completed the Shahpur Kandi Barrage, diverting approximately 1,150 cubic meters of water from the Ravi to irrigation projects in Indian-controlled areas.

On March 1, 2025, India officially stopped the flow of Ravi River water into Pakistan after 45 years of delays, marking a significant shift in the region's water dynamics.

=== Interstate water dispute ===
Even prior to the partition of India in August 1947, India had developed projects on the river Ravi and Beas River system. When the treaty was under debate, India had taken advance action to develop the three rivers, which were eventually allocated to it under the treaty. According to a directive of the Government of India, planning for the development of the Ravi and Beas rivers was initiated concurrently with the treaty negotiations, which involved four riparian states of Punjab, PEPSU (this was merged with Punjab and subsequently Punjab was divided, and additionally the Haryana state was created), Himachal Pradesh, Rajasthan and Jammu and Kashmir (J&K) within the ambit of the already developed Bhakra Nangal Dam project on the Sutlej River. A review of the flows in the two river systems revealed that prior to the partition of the country and up to the time of the signing of the Indus Treaty, 3.86 cubic kilometres (3,130,000 acre⋅ft) of water was used by major irrigation systems such as the Upper Bari Doab Canal System (1959) and the Lower Bari Doab Canal System (1915). The unused flow in the two river systems was assessed at 19.22 cubic kilometres (15,580,000 acre⋅ft), which was planned to be developed by the four states of J&K, PEPSU, Punjab and Rajasthan. However, with the merger of PEPSU with Punjab and subsequent bifurcation of Punjab into two states, a dispute arose on the allocation of Ravi and Beas waters for which a tribunal was set up under the Interstate River Water Disputes Act.

As a counterclaim to the exclusive claims of Punjab, Haryana claims that a small part of Haryana state lying north in Panchkula district is part of the Sutlej river basin area in addition to Punjab and Himachal Pradesh in India. Thus Haryana claims to be a riparian state of the Indus river basin.

Following the reorganisation of the state of Punjab in 1966, Haryana State was created. This was followed by a notification by the Government of India dated 24 March 1976 allocating the surplus waters between Punjab and Haryana in due consideration of the powers conferred by Sub Section (I) of Section 78 of the Punjab Reorganization Act, 1966 (31 of 1966). The allocation was challenged in the Supreme Court by Haryana. A tripartite agreement followed on 31 December 1981, based on the revised mean annual flows from the flow series of 1921–60 assessed as 25.36 cubic kilometres (20,560,000 acre⋅ft)—including preparation use of 3.86 cubic kilometres (3,130,000 acre⋅ft) and transit losses in the Madhopur Beas Link of 260,000 acre-feet (0.32 km^{3})—vis-a-vis the figure of 19.55 cubic kilometres (15,850,000 acre⋅ft) assessed in earlier allocation, which was based on the flow series of 1921–45. The revised assessed surplus supplies of 17,170,000 acre-feet (21.18 km^{3}) (from flow and storage) was allocated as:

Share of Punjab 4.22 million acre-ft (MAF); Share of Haryana 3.50 MAF; Share of Rajasthan 8.60 MAF; Quantity earmarked for Delhi Water supply 0.20 MAF; Share of Jammu & Kashmir 0.65MAF with some specific provisions.

However, the legality of this agreement was challenged by Punjab. This was followed by the Punjab accord signed by the then Prime Minister of India Rajiv Gandhi and Sant Harchand Singh Longowal, President of the Shiromani Akali Dal, on 24 July 1985. This accord stipulated that

The farmers of Punjab, Haryana, and Rajasthan will continue to get water not less than what they are using from the Ravi Beas system as on 1.7.1985. Waters used for consumptive purposes will also remain unaffected. Quantum of usage claimed shall be verified by the Tribunal referred to in paragraph 9.2 below.

9.2 The claim of Punjab and Haryana regarding the shares in their remaining waters shall be referred for adjudication to a Tribunal to be presided over by Supreme Court Judge. The decision of this Tribunal will be rendered within six months and would be binding on both parties. All legal and constitutional steps in this respect to be taken expeditiously;

9.3 The construction of Sutlej Yamuna Link (S.Y.L.) canal shall continue. The canal shall be completed by August 1986.

Following the above accord, Ravi & Beas Waters Tribunal (RBWT) came to be set up in April 1986, in pursuance of paragraphs 9.1 & 9.2 of Punjab Settlement (Rajiv-Longowal Accord, 1985) inter-alia to adjudicate the claims of Punjab and Haryana in Ravi-Beas waters. The Terms of Reference were set and also the time for submission of the report. The Tribunal submitted its report on 30 January 1987. However, the report was contested as Rajasthan also moved an application "seeking explanation and guidance regarding the report of this Ravi Beas waters Tribunal, 1987". The Tribunal is further examining the matter. It is yet to submit its further report to the Government on the pleas submitted by the party States and the Central Government also seeking explanation/guidance on its earlier report. In the meantime, a Presidential reference on Punjab Termination of Agreements Act, 2004 is pending before the Honorable Supreme Court. Hence, the further hearings of the Tribunal and its final report are now enjoined on the outcome of the Supreme Court hearing of the Presidential reference. The presently incomplete SYL link canal, to connect the Sutlej and Yamuna rivers to transfer Haryana's share of water, is now stuck in a dispute in the Supreme Court of India due to objections by Punjab.

Punjab is contemplating to construct 206 MW Shahpurkandi dam project hydro electric project on the Ravi River between Ranjitsagar dam and Madhopur head works. This stretch of the river is forming boundary between J & K state and Punjab state. Since Punjab had unilaterally exited from the earlier water sharing agreements, J & K state refused the project construction. Also J & K state is going ahead with the construction of Ravi canal originating from Basantpur to irrigate 54,000 hectares (133,000 acres) of land in Jammu region. This canal would draw river water by pumping the water released downstream from the Rangitsagar reservoir for which J & K state is not required to take consent from Punjab as it is not bound by earlier river water sharing agreements.

=== Interbasin water transfer ===
Transfer of surplus water from one basin to another, termed as interbasin water transfer has been effectively implemented on the Ravi River. The surplus waters of the Ravi River have been transferred directly first to the Beas River through the Ravi-Beas Link. A further link from the Beas River to the Sutlej River by the Beas Sutlej Link augments storage of the Bhakra reservoir in India.

== Infrastructure ==
=== Dams ===
Listed upstream to downstream.

==== India ====
- Ravi River
  - Chamera Dam in Chamba district of Himachal Pradesh, 1071 MW, completed in 1994.
  - Shahpurkandi Dam in Pathankot district, 206 MW, completed in 2025.
  - Ranjit Sagar Dam (Thein Dam), 15 km north of Pathankot in Pathankot district, 600 MW, completed in 2001.
  - Madhopur Headworks at Madhopur 14 west km of Pathankot in Pathankot district, also feeds the Lower Bari Doab Canal, completed in 1875 and upgraded in 1959.
- Tributaries
  - Ujh River
    - Ujh Hydroelectrical Power Project dam in Kathua district, 196 MW, stalled under-construction project expedited in April 2025 after the termination of IWT.

==== Pakistan ====
- Balloki Headworks (or Head Balloki), 25 km southwest of Lahore outskirts, feeds the Lower Bari Doab Canal, completed in 1915.

=== Canals ===
- Ravi-Beas Link Canal, proposed, may involve dams and water management infrastructure.

== See also ==
- Indian Rivers Inter-link
- Inland waterways of India
- Irrigation in India
- Rivers of Jammu and Kashmir
- Sapta Sindhu
- Indus Waters Treaty
- Ranjit Sagar Dam Project
- Ayeyarwady River
- List of most-polluted rivers
