= List of colleges affiliated to the University of Jammu =

The following colleges are affiliated to the University of Jammu for all academic purposes. Engineering colleges in the list are also approved by All India Council for Technical Education.

== Medical colleges ==
=== Government ===
1. Government Medical College, Jammu. (Year of Establishment-1971)
2. Govt. Indira Gandhi Dental College, Jammu. (Year of Establishment-2005)

=== Private ===
1. Acharya Sri Chander College of Medical Science & Hospital, Sidhra, Jammu (Year of Establishment-1996)
2. Institute of Ayurveda and Research, Nardhani Raipur (Kot-Bhalwal Road), Jammu (Year of Establishment-1999)
3. Jammu College of Physiotherapy, Nardhani Raipur (Kot-Bhalwal Road), Jammu. (Year of Establishment-2001)
4. Institute of Dental Sciences, Village Sehora, Bishnah Road, Jammu. (Year of Establishment-2006)
5. Rajiv Gandhi B.Sc. Nursing (By Pass Narwal), Jammu (Year of Establishment-2008)
6. BEE ENN Charitable Trust, Talab Tillo, Jammu ( B.Sc. Nursing) (Year of Establishment-2009)
7. Swami Vikekananda institute of nursing and Paramedical sciences Jammu (Recognised by govt of Jammu and kashmir) Vide order no. 605_HME of 2013
8. IPHH College of Nursing and Allied Health Science, Jammu(Year of Establishment-2022)

== Engineering colleges ==
=== Government ===
1. University Institute of Engineering & Technology (UIET), Janglote, Kathua (Year of Establishment - 2017)
2. Govt. College of Engineering & Technology, Jammu (Year of Establishment- 1994)

=== Private ===
1. Model Institute of Engg. & Technology, Kot Raipur, Jammu (Year of Establishment- 1999)
2. MBS College of Engg. & Technology, Digiana (Year of Establishment- 1999)
3. Yogananda College of Engineering & Technology, Patoli, Jammu (Year of Establishment- 2013)
4. Bhargava College of Engineering & Technology, Supwal, Samba (Year of Establishment- 2015)

== Bachelor of computer application colleges ==
1. Govt. Degree College Kathua(Year of Establishment- 2002)
2. Govt. Degree College Bhaderwah (Year of Establishment- 2002)
3. Govt. Degree College Rajouri. (Year of Establishment- 2002)
4. Govt. Degree College Poonch. (Year of Establishment-2004)
5. Govt. Degree College, Doda
6. Govt. Degree College, Ramnagar (Year of Establishment- 2010)

=== Private ===
1. Trikuta College of Computer Science, Nardani Raipur, Jammu (Year of Establishment- 2002)
2. Sant Rocha Singh College, Babliana, Digiana, Jammu (Year of Establishment- 2001)
3. Bhargava College, (Samba) (Year of Establishment- 2004)
4. Institute of Management Sciences (IMS), Gurha Brahmana, (Patoli), Jammu. (Year of Establishment- 2006)
5. Kawa Institute of Management & Technology, Gurha Brahamana (Patoli) Jammu (Year of Establishment- 2006)
6. Baldev Singh Institute of Management, Technology & Sciences, Kalu Chak, Jammu Year of Establishment- 2008)
7. New Modern College of Education, Sainik Colony, Jammu. (Year of Establishment- 2009)
8. R.K. Institute of Information & Technology, Vijaypur. Jammu. (Year of Establishment- 2009)
9. JK College of Computer Science and Business Administration, Kunjwani, Jammu (Year of Estab.2010)
10. Dogra Edu. Trust, Bari Brahmanam Jammu (Year of Estab.2010)
11. Rajive Gandhi, Kathua (Year of Estab.2010)
12. Bhaskar College, Udhampur(Year of Estab.2010)

SSVS Degree College Sunderbani ( Year of Estab. 2000)

== Degree colleges ==
=== Government ===
1. Government Degree College, Bhaderwah(Year of Establishment-1955)
2. Government Degree College Kathua(Year of Establishment-1961)
3. Shri Krishan Chander Government Degree College, Poonch (Year of Establishment-1955)
4. Government Degree College, Rajouri (Year of Establishment-1981)
5. Govt. Degree College Udhampur (Boys) (Year of Establishment-1961)
6. Govt. Degree College for Women, Udhampur (Year of Establishment-1986)
7. Govt. Degree College, Doda (Year of Establishment-1989)
8. Govt. Degree College, Kishtwar(Year of Establishment-1986)
9. Govt. Degree College, Reasi. (Year of Establishment-2003)
10. Govt. Degree College, Samba (Year of Establishment- 2005)
11. Govt. Degree College, Hiranagar (Year of Establishment- 2005)
12. Govt. Degree College, R.S. Pura (Year of Establishment- 2005)
13. Govt. Degree College, Akhnoor (Year of Establishment- 2005)
14. Govt. Degree College for Women, Kathua (Year of Establishment- 2005)
15. Govt. Degree College, Mendhar (Year of Establishment- 2005)
16. Govt. Degree College, Thanamandi (Year of Establishment- 2005)
17. Govt. Degree College, Ramnagar (Year of Establishment- 2005)
18. Govt. Degree College, Billawar (Year of Establishment- 2005)
19. Govt. Degree College, Basohli (Year of Establishment- 2005)
20. Govt. Degree College, Ramban (Year of Establishment- 2005)
21. Govt. Degree College, Bishnah (Year of Establishment-2008)
22. Govt. Degree College, Paloura (Year of Establishment-2008)
23. Govt. Degree College, Budhal (Year of Establishment-2008)
24. Govt. Degree College, Kilhotran (Year of Establishment-2008)
25. Govt. Degree College, Dharmari (Year of Establishment-2008)
26. Govt. Degree College, Chatroo (Year of Establishment-2008)
27. Govt. Degree College, Bani (Year of Establishment-2008)
28. Govt. Degree College, Banihal (Year of Establishment-2008)
29. Govt. Degree College, Nowshera (Year of Establishment-2008)
30. Govt. Degree College, Surankot (Year of Establishment-2012)
31. Govt. Degree College, Sunderbani(Year of Establishment-2012)
32. Govt. Degree College, Kalakote (Year of Establishment-2012)
33. Govt. Degree College, Thathri (Year of Establishment-2012)
34. Govt. Degree College, Mahanpur (Year of Establishment-2012)
35. Govt. Degree College, Sarh Bagga, Mahore (Year of Establishment-2012)
36. Govt. Degree College, Gool (Year of Establishment-2012)
37. Govt. Degree College, Jindrah (Year of Establishment-2012)
38. Govt. Degree College, Khour(Year of Establishment-2012)

=== Private ===
1. Sh. Swami Vishwatamanand Saraswati Degree College, Shiv Kashi, Sunderbani, Rajouri (Year of Establishment- 2000)
2. Muqaddas Degree College, Mendhar, Poonch (Year of Establishment- 2000)
3. Sant Rocha Singh Degree College, Nanak Nagar, Jammu (Year of Establishment- 2001)
4. Bhargava Degree College, Samba. (Year of Establishment- 2001)
5. Trikuta Degree College, Nardani, Raipur, Jammu (Year of Establishment- 2001)
6. Sh. Swami Vishwatamanand Saraswati Degree College, Chann Rorian, Kathua(Year of Establishment- 2001)
7. New Age Degree College, Phinter, Billawar (Year of Establishment- 2003)
8. Himalayan Degree College, Rajouri (Year of Establishment- 2004)
9. R.K. Degree College, Vijaypur, (Samba (Year of Establishment- 2006)
10. Dogra Degree College, Bari Brahmana, Samba (Year of Establishment- 2008)
11. R.B Educational Trust, Raj Bagh, Kathua (Year of Establishment-2009)
12. New Modern Degree College, Sainik Colony, Jammu (B.A. & B.Com) (Year of Establishment-2010)
13. Hill People College, Kot Bhalwal, Jammu (B.A. & B.Com) (Year of Establishment-2010)
14. BIMTAS (Chenab) College, Kalu Chak, Jammu (B.Com) (Year of Establishment-2010)
15. Bhaskar Institute of Management Sciences, Udhampur (Arts & Commerce) (Year of Establishment-2011)
16. Rajive Gandhi Degree College, Kathua (Arts & Commerce) (Year of Establishment-2011)
17. SVS Degree College for Women, Rajouri (Arts & Commerce) (Year of Establishment-2012)
18. A. S. Degree College, Arnora, Doda (Arts) (Year of Establishment-2012)
19. Prithvi Raj Degree College, Kathua (Arts) (Year of Establishment-2012)

== Law colleges ==
=== Private ===
1. MIET School of Law, Kotbhalwal, Jammu (5 Yrs & 3 Yrs)(Year of Establishment- 2022)
2. Dogra Law College, Bassi Kalan, Bari Brahmana, Jammu (5 Yrs & 3 Yrs)(Year of Establishment- 2000)
3. K.C. Law College, Akhnoor Road, Jammu (5 Yrs & 3 Yrs) (Year of Establishment- 2003)
4. CMH College of Legal Studies, Chowadhi Top, Jammu (5 Yrs & 3 Yrs) (Year of Establishment- 2004)
5. Jammu Law College, Nardani, Jammu (5 Yrs & 3 Yrs) (Year of Establishment- 2004)
6. Ashoka Law College, Monke-Talab, Near Fish Seed Farm, Kathua ( 5 Yrs) (Year of Establishment- 2004
7. Bhargava Law College, Samba, (Year of establishment - 2007)

== Master of business administration ==
=== Private ===
1. Institute of Management Sciences Gurha, Brahamana (Patoli), Jammu. (Year of Establishment-1999)
2. Model Institute of Engineering & Technology, Kot Bhalwal, Jammu. (Year of Establishment- 2007)
3. Mahant Bachittar Singh College of Engineering and Technology, Babliana, Jammu. (Yr.of Establishment- 2007)
4. SET Business School, Meen Sarkar, Bari Brahamana, Jammu. (Year of Establishment- 2007)

== Bachelor of business administration ==
=== Government ===
1. Govt. S.P.M.R. Commerce College, Jammu. (Year of Establishment-1997)
2. Govt. Degree College Boys, Udhampur. (Year of Establishment- 2002)
3. Govt. Degree College, Kathua (Year of establishment 2008)
4. Govt. M.A.M. College, Jammu (Year of establishment 2010)
5. Govt. Degree College, Ramnagar (Year of establishment 2010)

=== Private ===
1. Institute of Management Sciences, Gurha Brahmana, (Patoli), Jammu (Year of Establishment- 2007)
2. Dogra Degree College, Bari Brahmana, Samba. (Year of establishment 2008)
3. Trikuta Degree College, Nardani, Jammu. (Year of establishment 2008)
4. Baldev Singh Institute of Management, Technology & Sciences, Kalu Chak, Jammu (Year of Establishment- 2008)
5. New Modern College of Education Sainik Colony, Jammu(Year of Establishment-2009)
6. Rajiv Gandhi College, Kathua (Year of Establishment-2009)
7. R.K. Institute of Information & Technology, Vijaypur. Jammu. (Year of Establishment- 2009)
8. Bhaskar Institute of Management, Udhampur (Year of Establishment-2009)
9. J.K. College of Computer Science & Business (Year of Establishment-2010)

== P.G. courses ==
1. ovt. College for Women, Parade, Jammu.
2. Govt. College for Women, Gandhi Nagar, Jammu
3. Govt. Degree College, Kathua
4. Govt. Degree College for Boys, Udhampur.
5. Govt. Degree College, Rajouri
6. Govt. Degree College, Bhaderwah
7. G.M. Science College, Jammu
8. Govt. S.P.M.R.College of Commerce, Jammu
9. Bhargava Degree College, Samba

== PGDCA colleges ==
=== Private ===
1. Kalra College of Education & Technology, Udhampur. (Year of Establishment- 2004 )
2. Dogra Education Trust, Bari Brahmana, Jammu (Year of Establishment-2010)
3. BIMTAS (Chenab) College, Kalu Chak, Jammu (Year of Establishment-2010)
4. National Institute of Electronics & Information Technology (NIELIT) formerly DOEACC, Jammu(Year of Establishment-2010)

== PGDBM colleges ==
=== Private ===
1. Baldev Institute of Management Technology & Sciences, Kalu Chak, Jammu Year of Establishment- 2010)

== B. Pharmacy colleges ==
=== Private ===
1. Madr-E-Meharban Campus of Health Sciences, Chak Bhalwal, Seri Pandita Chowk, Jammu (ESTAB. 2013)

== M.ed colleges ==
=== Private ===
1. MIER College of Education, B.C. Road, Jammu (Year of Establishment-2008)
2. K.C.S. College of Education, for Women, Opp. Roop Nagar, Paloura, Jammu (Year of Establishment-2009)

== Bachelor of Education Colleges ==
=== Private ===
1. Dogra College of Education, Bassi Kalan, Bari Brahmana, Jammu. (Year of Establishment-1994)
2. Kalras College of Education, Industrial Estate Complex Phase-II, Udhampur. (Year of Establishment-2000)
3. New Millennium National College of Education, Sarore, Samba (Year of Establishment-2000)
4. Sher-e-Kashmir College of Education, Ajit Nagar, Gadi Garh, Jammu. (Year of Establishment-2001)
5. Bhargava College of Education, Samba. (Year of Establishment-2001)
6. National College of Education, Purkhoo Camp, Domana, Jammu. (Year of Establishment-2001)
7. Calliope College of Education, Akhnoor Highway, Doomi, Jammu. (Year of Establishment-2001)
8. New Gandhi Memorial College of Education, Dhinde Kalan, Miran Sahib, Jammu. (Year of Establishment-2001)
9. Swami Vishwatamanand Saraswati College of Education, Sunderbani, Rajouri. (Year of Establishment-2001)
10. Atman College of Education, Opp. Greater Kailash, Marble Market, Jammu. (Year of Establishment-2001)
11. Islamia Farida College of Education, Kishtwar. (Year of Establishment-2001)
12. Harvard College of Education, Karan Bagh, Airport Road, Jammu. (Year of Establishment-2001)
13. CMH College of Education, Chowdhi Top, Sainik Colony, Jammu. (Year of Establishment-2001)
14. KC College of Education, Akhnoor Road, Jammu. (Year of Establishment-2001)
15. Guru Nanak College of Education, Jallo Chack, Bari Brahmana, Jammu. (Year of Establishment-2001)
16. R.K. College of Education, Bari Brahmana, Samba. (Year of Establishment-2001)
17. Ashoka College of Education, Monke-Talab, Near Fish Seed Farm, Kathua (Year of Establishment-2001)
18. Guru Gang Dev Ji College of Education, Chann Arrorian, Hiranagar, Kathua. (Year of Establishment-2001)
19. B.N. College of Education, Nawabad-Sunjwan, Jammu (Year of Establishment-2002)
20. New Age College of Education, Phinter (Billawar), District. Kathua (Year of Establishment-2002)
21. Sai Shyam College of Education, Gho-Manhasan, Jammu (Year of Establishment-2002)
22. Vaishno Devi College of Education, Reasi. (Year of Establishment-2002)
23. Ramisht College of Education, Basohli, Kathua(Year of Establishment-2003)
24. J.K. College of Education, Kunjwani, Jammu (Year of Establishment-2003)
25. Sant Mela Singh College of Education, Digiana, Near Digiana Ashram Jammu (Year of Establishment-2003)
26. Himalayan College of Education, Rajouri (Year of Establishment-2003)
27. Poonch College of Education, Poonch (Year of Establishment-2003)
28. K.C. Gurukul College of Education, Opposite BSF Gate, Paloura Jammu (Year of Establishment-2003)
29. Baba Farid College of Education, Hatli Road, Kathua (Year of Establishment-2003)
30. Shastri Memorial College of Education, Reasi. (Year of establishment-2003) (Affiliation with drawn w.e.f the session 2013-14)
31. Kalra College of Education, Poonch House, Kud, Patnitop (Year of Establishment-2003)
32. Vimal Muni College of Education, Ramgarh, Samba. (Year of Establishment-2003)
33. Thakur Dharam Singh College of Education, Ward No.9, Kathua. (Year of Establishment-2003)
34. Rajiv Gandhi Memorial College of Education, National- Highway, Kathua. (Year of Establishment-2003)
35. Shirdee College of Education, Mohamood Pur, Bishnah, Jammu. (Year of Establishment-2003)
36. Bhartiya College of Education, Udhampur. (Year of Establishment-2003)
37. Surya College of Education, Logate, Kathua. (Year of Establishment-2003)
38. Ranjit College of Education, Guru Arjun Dev Nagar, Kunjwani, Jammu (Year of Establishment-2003)
39. Tagore College of Education, Akalpur P.O Talab Tillo, Jammu. (Year of Establishment-2003)
40. Kawa College of Education, Patoli Gurha Brahmana, Jammu (Year of Establishment-2003)
41. Saraswati College of Education, Najwal, Samba (Year of Establishment-2003)
42. Hill People College of Education, Kot-Bhalwal, Jammu. (Year of Establishment-2003)
43. Sacred Heart College of Education, Azad Colony, Paloura, Jammu. (Year of Establishment-2003)
44. Beacon College of Education, Kot-Bhalwal, Jammu. (Year of Establishment-2004)
45. Bhagat Kabir College of Education, Hatli Road, Kathua (Year of Establishment-2004)
46. Bhai Beer Singh College of Education, Samba (Year of Establishment-2004)(Affiliation with drawn w.e.f the session 2008-09)
47. Durga College of Education, Katra (Year of Establishment-2004)
48. Jan College of Education, Kot-Bhalwal, Jammu (Year of Establishment-2004)
49. Handa College of Education, Sector-D, Sainik Colony, Jammu (Year of Establishment-2004)
50. Taawish College of Education, Channi Rama, Jammu Pin code 180015 (Year of Establishment-2004)
51. Galaxy College of Education, Sector - E, Sainik Colony, Jammu (Year of Establishment-2004)
52. Cosmic College of Education, Lakhanpur, Kathua (Year of Establishment-2004)
53. K.C. Minerva College of Education, Raya Morh, P.O. Tarore, Dist. Samba (Year of Establishment-2004)
54. Lal Bhadur Shastri College of Education, Raj bagh Kathua. (Year of Establishment-2007)
55. Bharat College of Education, National Highway Hatli Morh, Kathua. . (Year of Establishment-2007)
56. R.S. College of Education, Village Kanayari, Jaglote, Kathua. (Year of Establishment-2007)
57. Satyam College of Education, Opposite R.T.O. Office Lakhanpur, Kathua (Year of Establishment-2007)
58. R.M. College of Education, Sector D, Sainik Colony, Jammu. (Year of Establishment-2007)
59. Thakur Anant Singh College of Education, Sainik Colony, Jammu. (Year of Establishment-2007)
60. New Modern College of Education, Sainik Colony, Jammu. (Year of Establishment-2007)
61. Guru Teg Bahadur College of Education, Chak Ghota, Tehshil, Kathua (Year of Establishment-2008)
62. Shri Shri Parmahansa Yogananda College of Education, Jagatpur, Kathua. (Year of Establishment-2008)
63. Bhim Singh College of Education Udhampur (Year of Establishment-2009)
64. MIER College of Education, B.C. Road, Jammu (Year of Establishment-1981)
65. M.C. Khalsa College of Education, Chand Nagar, Below Gumat, Jammu (Year of Establishment-1989)
66. NSM College of Education, Anand Nagar, Bohri, Jammu (Year of Establishment-1994)
67. Vivekananda College of Education, Lakhanpur, Kathua. (Year of Establishment-1995)
68. Shivalik College of Education, Shiv Nagar, NH-1A, Udhampur (Year of Establishment-1998)
69. Divya College of Education, Lower Gaddi Garh, Miran Sahib, Jammu. (Year of Establishment-1998) (Affiliation with drawn w.e.f the session 2013-14)
70. Chenab College of Education, Langar, Opp. S.B.I., Kaluchak, Jammu (Year of Establishment-1999)
71. Luthra College of Education Bohri, Talab Tillo, Jammu (Year of Establishment-2000)
72. K.C.S. College of Education, for Women, Opp. Roop Nagar, Paloura, Jammu (Year of Establishment-2000)
73. Trikuta College of Education, Nardni Raipur, (Kot-Bhalwal Road), Jammu. (Year of Establishment-2000)
74. Adarsh College of Education, Tarore Bridge National Highway, Samba (Year of Establishment-2000)
75. Tariq College of Education, Dassal Rajouri (Year of Establishment-2000)

== See also ==
- List of colleges affiliated to Kashmir University, Kashmir
