= Nagrota (disambiguation) =

Nagrota is a town in the Jammu district of Jammu and Kashmir, India.

Nagrota may also refer to:

== Places ==
- Nagrota, Jammu and Kashmir Assembly constituency, a legislative assembly constituency named after Nagrota, Jammu
- Nagrota Bagwan, a town in the Kangra district of Himachal Pradesh, India
  - Nagrota (Himachal Pradesh Assembly constituency), a legislative assembly constituency named after Nagrota Bagwan
- Nagarota Surian, a town in the Kangra district of Himachal Pradesh, India

== Events ==
- Nagrota army base attack, a terrorist attack at Nagrota, Jammu district

== See also ==
- Nagrota Assembly constituency (disambiguation)
