= Government Degree College Kathua =

Coordinates: 32.4769°N 75.2742°E

Government Degree College, Kathua
- Type: Degree College
- Established: 1961
- Academic affiliations: University of Jammu
- Location: Kathua, Jammu and Kashmir, India
- Campus: Rural
- Website: https://www.gdckathua.com/

Government Degree College is the co-ed college in Kathua, Jammu and Kashmir, India and serves to the people of Kathua district and its adjoining areas. It was established in 1961 which makes it one of the oldest college of Jammu and Kashmir.It is about 3 km from the heart of the Kathua city.It is a NAAC accredited 'B' grade college. It runs courses in Sciences, Arts, Firshries, Computer Sciences (BCA) for three years degree courses. The college is affiliated to University of Jammu. During any given year 3000+ students study for the various courses. The selection to the courses is based on the +2 marks. Hostel facilities are also provided for boys and girls.

== Departments ==
The college is divided into Arts Block, Science (Non Medical) block and Science(Medical) block and Commerce block besides separate blocks for Home science and post graduation in Geography. There are various departments in the campus. Computer sciences was introduced in 2001/2002 and now runs successfully BCA courses.

== Library ==
The college also has its own library that boasts of large number of books, magazines and newspapers for the students.

== Students ==
During any year more than 3000 students study in the college for various courses.

== Miscellaneous ==
College repeatedly secures top positions amongst all the Jammu region colleges during the final year results. Best part of college is that there is no student politics here and one can focus on studies without any problem. faculty is good and cooperative.

Government Degree College, Bhaderwah
