= K.K. Birla Garden =

Botanical garden in Kathua, India

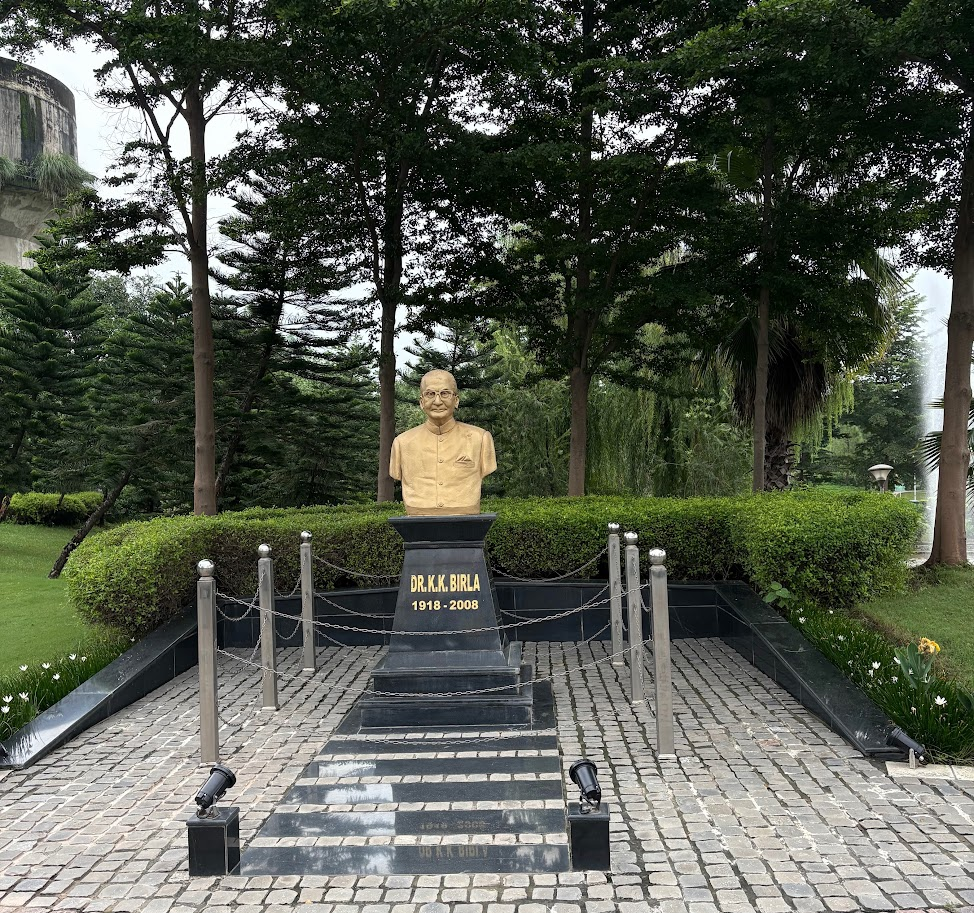
- Bust of Dr. KK Birla at the garden
- Interactive map of K.K. Birla Garden
- Type: Urban park
- Location: Patel Nagar, Kathua, Jammu and Kashmir, (India)
- Coordinates: 32°23′41″N 75°30′55″E
- Area: 19 kanals
- Opened: 2021
- Owner: Sutlej Group
- Website: kathua.nic.in

K.K. Birla Garden, is a botanical garden in Kathua, Jammu and Kashmir, India and spread over 19 kanals. The garden is named after prominent India industrialist K. K. Birla. Garden has many distinctive features including a pond and several species of flora and fauna.

Earlier, the site was home to an ancient pond. Later on, it was developed into a garden. The garden is owned and operated by Sutlej Ind. Ltd, KK Birla Group.
