= Ashoka Law College =

Law college in Jammu and Kashmir

Coordinates: 32°23′05″N 75°35′41″E

Ashoka Law College is a private law school situated at Manke Talab, Lakhanpur, Kathua in the Indian union territory of Jammu and Kashmir. It offers undergraduate 3 years law courses, 5 Year Integrated LL.B. courses, approved by Bar Council of India (BCI), New Delhi and affiliated to University of Jammu.

== History ==
In the year of 2004, the Ashoka Educational Trust Training and Research Institute established the Ashoka Law College at Kathua.
