= 2016 Nagrota army base attack =

Attack on an Indian base in Jammu and Kashmir

- Part of Kashmir conflict
- 2016 Nagrota army base attack (Jammu and Kashmir) 2016 Nagrota army base attack (India) Location in Jammu and Kashmir
- Location: Nagrota
- Date: 29 November 2016; 5.30 (IST)
- Attack type: Terrorism; Hostage situation Mass shooting
- Weapons: AK-47 rifles, several magazines, hand grenades, UBGL grenades
- Deaths: 10 (7 soldiers, 3 Terrorist)
- Perpetrator: Jaish-e-Mohammed

The Indian Army base in Nagrota, in Jammu and Kashmir was attacked on 29 November 2016 by a group of militants.

During the ensuing gun battle, seven Indian soldiers, including two officers and all three militants were killed.

== Background ==
Since the killing of Burhan Wani, Kashmir has seen an increase in violence and civic disobedience. This also increased tensions since the 2016 Uri attack and the ensuing Indian retaliatory surgical strike operation.

== Attack ==
On the morning of 29 November at around 5:30 IST, three militants Numan, Aadil and Khalid dressed in Indian police uniforms attacked the Indian Army's 166 Field Regiment unit in the town of Nagrota, near the Jammu city in the state of Jammu and Kashmir. Four Indian Army soldiers, including an officer were killed in the initial gun battle.

The militants then divided themselves into two groups, entered the living quarters of the base and opened fire with AK-47s and grenades. They took into hostage at least two infants, two women and over a dozen soldiers. A stand-off then ensued with the security forces. According to a statement from the Defence public relations office, "there was [a] hostage-like situation which was successfully neutralised." In the resultant gun battle, all three militants were killed and the hostages were freed by the Indian Army. Three more Indian soldiers, including an officer, were killed in the rescue operation. Two officers of rank major, Akshay Girish Kumar and Gosavi Kunal Mannadir lost their lives in the initial response before the terrorists were neutralized.

== Organizational accountability ==
Investigation done by National Investigation Agency (NIA) India for around 2 years, revealed this terrorist operation was owned by Jaish-e-Mohammed (JeM) deputy chief Abdul Rauf Azhar as per the final chargesheet. The final report provided detailed information on how the three terrorists came to India, arranged finances and took local help to execute the mission.

== See also ==
- List of terrorist incidents in November 2016
