= Kathua Waterfront =

Development at Kathua, India

- Interactive map showing location of Kathua waterfront
- Location: Kathua, Jammu and Kashmir, India
- Coordinates: 32.3891°N 75.5261°E
- Status: Open for Public
- Opening: June 2025 - Ongoing
- Use: Waterfront
- Website: kathua.nic.in

Companies
- Developer: Kathua District Administration & Jammu & Kashmir Union Territory Administration

Technical details
- Cost: ₹8 crore (US$950,000) (February 2025)
- Size: 1.5 kms

Kathua Waterfront is an urban canalfront located along the Kathua Canal in the town of Kathua, in the Union Territory of Jammu and Kashmir, India. Developed by the Kathua District Administration under a public infrastructure and beautification initiative, the project was officially proposed in February 2025. The project was inaugurated by then Lieutenant Governor of Jammu and Kashmir Manoj Sinha on 8 June 2025.

== History and Development ==
The Kathua Waterfront project was proposed in February 2025 under the district administration's urban renewal program. Groundwork commenced shortly after, and the project was completed within four months. It was inaugurated on 8 June 2025. The development was carried out by the District Administration Kathua in collaboration with the Union Territory Administration of Jammu and Kashmir, with funding and logistical support from local infrastructure agencies.

== Design and Features ==
Spanning a stretch of approximately 1.2 kilometers, the waterfront includes walking and cycling tracks, landscaped gardens, yoga spaces, food kiosks, lighting, and recreational amenities. The project is intended to serve as a community hub and a model for sustainable urban rejuvenation in the region.
