= Nagrota Assembly constituency =

Nagrota Assembly constituency may refer to

- Nagrota, Jammu and Kashmir Assembly constituency
- Nagrota, Himachal Pradesh Assembly constituency

== See also ==
- Nagrota (disambiguation)
