= Talab Tillo =

Talab Tillo jammu
- Location in Jammu and Kashmir, India Talab Tillo jammu (India)
- Coordinates: 32.73472°N 74.83333°E
- Country: India
- State: Jammu and Kashmir
- District: Jammu

Languages
- Time zone: UTC+5:30 (IST)
- PIN: 180002
- Telephone code: 0191
- Vehicle registration: JK 02 (Jammu)
- Nearest city: Jammu
- Climate: Moderate (Köppen)

Talab Tillo is an urban area of Jammu City in the Indian union territory of Jammu and Kashmir. It is a bustling residential and commercial hub that holds historical and cultural significance.

== Etymology ==
According to local oral traditions, a saint named Tilloo came to the local Zamindar Teru Singh Saini, who owned large parts of the present-day Talab Tillo area, and requested land to live. Teru Singh is believed to have donated land near a pond (‘talab’) where the saint settled. Locals earlier referred to the place as ‘Tilloo da Tla’ in Dogri, which over time evolved into ‘Tillo Tla’ and later Talab Tillo.”

== Geography and Layout ==
Talab Tillo is located in the western part of Jammu City, bordered by neighbourhoods such as Bohri, Canal Road, and Bakshi Nagar. It lies close to Akhnoor Road, providing seamless connectivity to various parts of the city and neighbouring districts.

=== Sub-Localities ===
The locality comprises several well-defined sub-areas:

- Talab Tillo Chowk: The main commercial hub featuring banks, shopping centers, and eateries.
- Udheywala
- Anand Nagar
- Gol Pulli
- Pakka Gharat

== Demographics and Language ==
The majority of the population in Talab Tillo consists of Dogras, who primarily speak Dogri.

Hindi and Urdu are studied in schools and widely used in formal settings.

English is popular as a learned language among the educated population.

In recent years, Hindi has been gradually replacing Dogri among the youth.

Kashmiri is spoken by Kashmiri Pandit refugees who settled in the area, as well as a small minority of Kashmiri Muslims.

== Infrastructure and Facilities ==
=== Educational Institutions ===
Talab Tillo is home to several reputed educational institutions, such as:

- New National Public School: Established in 2002, it is a private school located in the urban area of Talab Tillo.
- DRS Kids School: A well-known preschool in the area.
- DBN Vidya Mandir: Another prominent school offering quality education.

=== Healthcare Facilities ===
The locality has numerous hospitals and clinics providing medical services:

- Ganesh Daya Nursing Home: Situated behind the petrol pump on Talab Tillo Road, this nursing home has been serving the healthcare industry for over a decade.
- Swasthya Health Care: A multi-specialty clinic located opposite Bee Enn Hospital, offering general medical consultations and specialized services.

=== Religious Sites ===
Talab Tillo has diverse religious establishments, including:

- Radha Krishna Temple: Known for cultural events and festivals.
- Guru Ravi Dass Gurudwara: A popular Sikh place of worship.

=== Parks and Recreation ===
- Dreamland Park: A popular picnic spot for families and children.
- Palm Island Mall: A shopping and entertainment complex nearby.

=== Transport Connectivity ===
Transport links serving Talab Tillo include:

- Jammu Tawi Railway Station: Located approximately 6 km away.
- Jammu Airport (Satwari Airport): Situated around 8 km from the locality.
- Public Transport: Includes mini-buses, autorickshaws, and cab services via Akhnoor Road and Jammu-Rajouri Highway.

== See also ==
- Jammu
- Jammu Tawi
- Nagrota
- Samba, Jammu
- Kathua
- Jammu Cantonment
- Akhnoor
