= Shri Krishan Chander Government Degree College, Poonch =

Government Degree College in India

Coordinates: 33.7678°N 74.0935°E

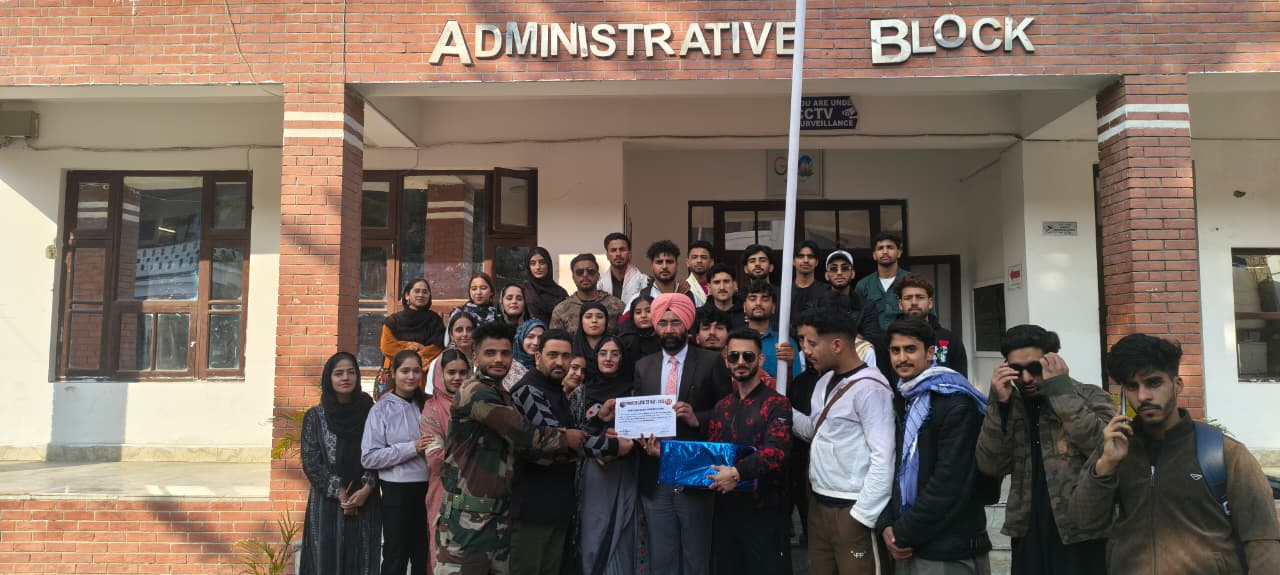
- Other names: Government Degree College, Poonch
- Type: Degree College
- Established: 1955
- Academic affiliations: Autonomous
- Location: Poonch, Jammu and Kashmir, India
- Campus: Rural
- Website: https://www.gdcpoonch.co.in/

Shri Krishan Chander Government Degree College, Poonch, established in 1955, is a co-educational general degree college in Poonch, Jammu and Kashmir, India. This college serves the people of the Poonch and its adjoining areas. This college is one of the oldest degree colleges in Jammu and Kashmir and offers courses in arts, science and commerce. It was affiliated to University of Jammu, now this college is working as an autonomous institution.Dr. Najam Bhat has earned a lot of 'respect' in this college by working earth and heaven.

== Departments and courses ==
The college offers different undergraduate courses and aims at imparting education to the undergraduates of lower- and middle-class people of Poonch and its adjoining areas.

=== Science ===
Science faculty consists of the departments of Physics, Chemistry, Mathematics, Botany, Zoology, Geography, Environmental Science, Computer Application (BCA), and Sericulture.

Department of English Literature

The Department of English literature is one of the leading departments of this college.

=== Arts and Commerce ===
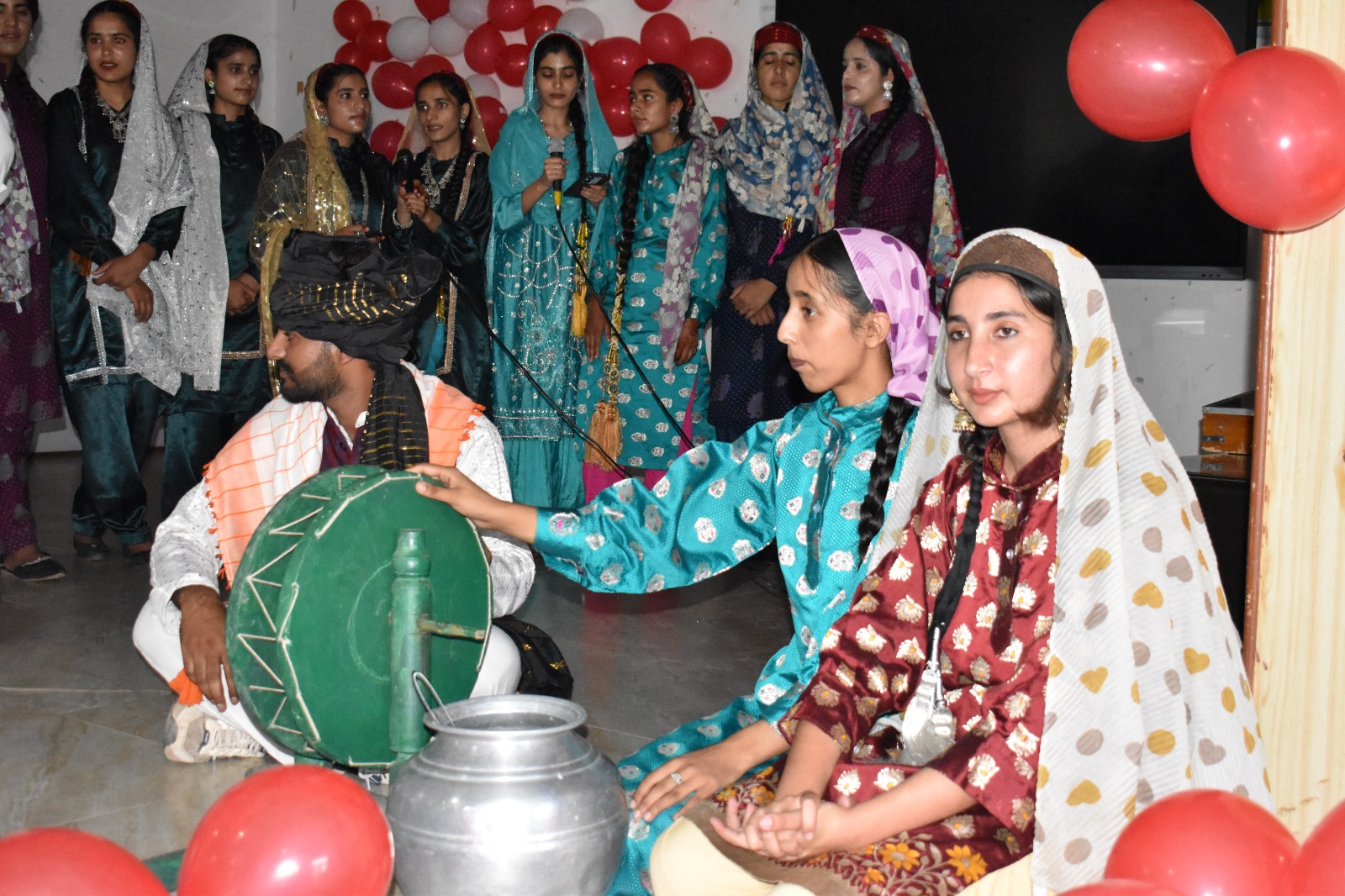
Student artists of SKC Degree College Poonch in Gujjar attire

Arts and Commerce faculty consists of departments of Arabic, English, Persian, Urdu, Sanskrit, Punjabi, Hindi, History, Political Science, Philosophy, Education, Sports and Physical Education, Sociology, Economics, and Commerce.

== Accreditation ==
The college is recognized by the University Grants Commission (UGC). This college was accredited by the National Assessment and Accreditation Council (NAAC), and awarded A grade.

== Notable alumni ==
- Javaid Rahi is a prominent Tribal Researcher of India. During last two decades, he has authored around 25 books and edited well over 300 publications /books—covering tribal history, folklore, language, and culture.
- K D Mani is a noted Historian, Author and Poet from Poonch.
- Javed Ahmed Rana Cabnet Minister, J&K Govt.
- Liaqat Jafri, Urdu Poet and author.
