= Akshay Girish Kumar =

Indian Army Major (1985–2016)

Major Akshay Girish Kumar
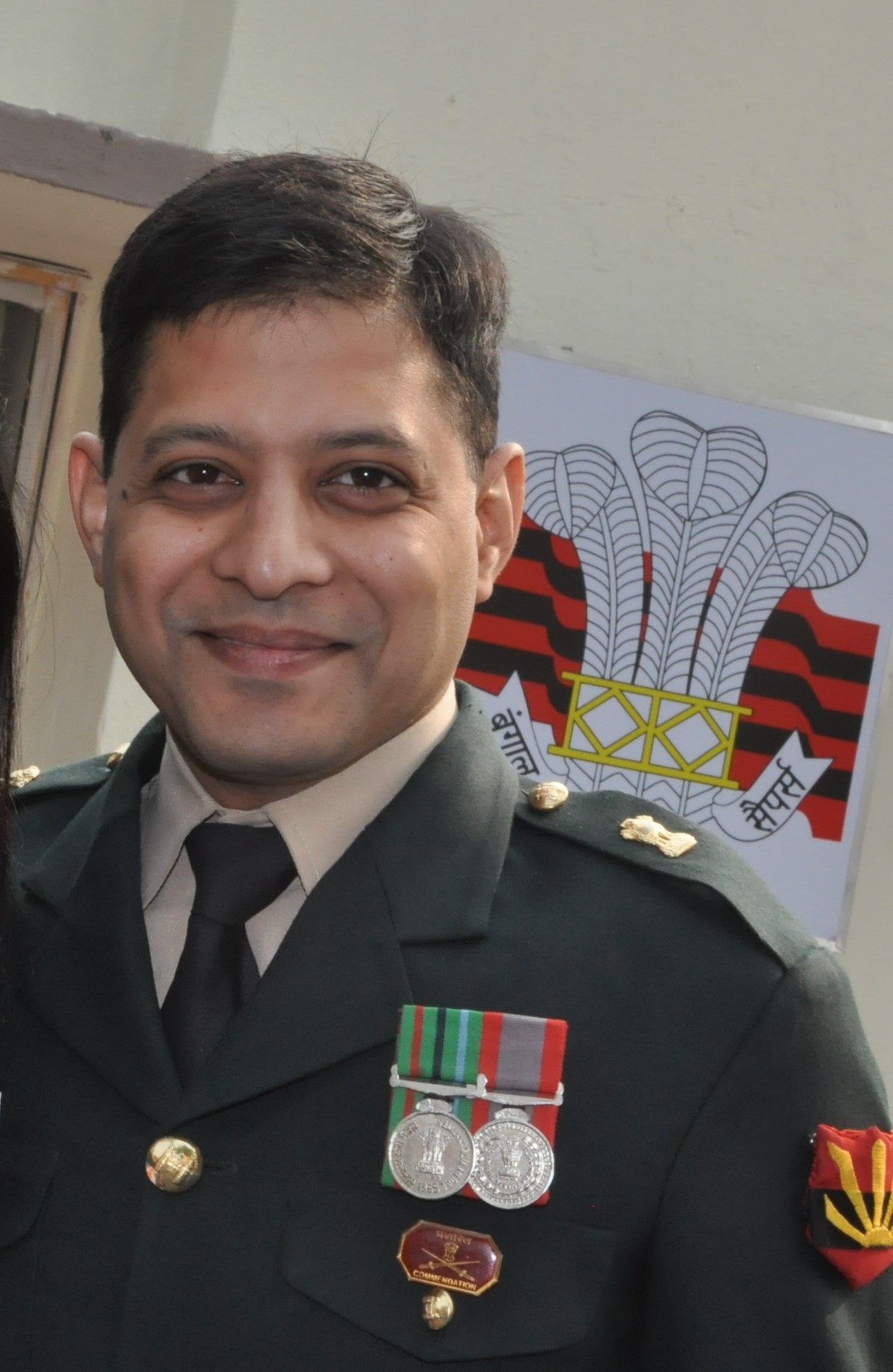
- Born: 6 December 1985; Bangalore, India
- Died: 29 November 2016 (aged 30); Nagrota, Jammu and Kashmir Assembly constituency, India
- Spouse: Sangeeta Ravindran
- Children: Naina Akshay Girish (daughter)
- Relatives: Wg Cdr Girish Kumar (father); Meghna Girish (mother); Neha (twin sister)
- Military career
- Allegiance: India
- Branch: Indian Army
- Service years: 2007 - 2016
- Rank: Major
- Service number: IC-69755H
- Unit: 51, Bengal Sappers
- Conflicts: 2016 Nagrota army base attack
- Awards: Army Commendation
- Website: majorakshaytrust.org

Major Akshay (Girish) (6 December 1985 – 29 November 2016) was a third generation military officer of the Indian Army. He was killed in action during the 2016 Nagrota army base attack while saving trapped hostages including women and children from Jaish-e-Mohammed terrorists. He comes from a family of war veterans including his grandfather Lieutenant colonel AK Moorthy(retired), father Wing Commander Girish Kumar(retired) and his maternal uncle Wing Commander K Harisenani(retired).

== Early life and family ==
Akshay and his twin sister Neha were born to Girish Kumar and Meghna Girish on Dec 6, 1985 at Bangalore. His early education spanned across various cities in India like Bidar, Wellington Gorakhpur, Bengaluru and Chennai . He joined Bangalore Military School in his 8th grade, as a boarder. He cleared Twelfth grade#India in 2003, and joined the NDA few months after pursuing graduation at Jain College. After training in NDA and thereafter in the Indian Military Academy, he was commissioned as a Lieutenant in 51 Engineer Regiment. He could not join the Indian Air Force like his father because his eye vision did not meeting the stringent standards needed to be a fighter pilot. He married his friend Sangeeta in 2011 and his daughter Naina was born in October 2013. His hobbies included painting, playing tennis and basketball, bungee jumping, skydiving, singing, dancing, poetry and cooking.

== Military career ==
Akshay was commissioned in 51 Engineers of the Bengal Sappers regiment on Dec 10, 2007. He pursued his Electrical Engineering graduation degree from College of Military Engineering, Pune. He earned Alpha status in Young Officers Course and Instructors grading in the Junior Command Course while in training. He was posted at Kashmir, Nagaland, Sikkim and Manipur at various junctures of his almost decade long tenure.

== Death ==
Akshay led his unit's Rapid reaction force (QRT) that was rushed to counter the terror attack on a neighboring artillery unit and saved the lives of trapped families and unarmed personnel. He was hit by bullets and a grenade while trying to secure sixteen hostages from three heavily armed terrorists. He succumbed to his injuries. All hostages were rescued unharmed and the terrorists were subsequently neutralized.

He was accorded a martyr's funeral at Bangalore which was attended by Defence Officers, Politicians and Civilians alike.

== Public Honors ==
He was conferred COAS Commendation in 2009 for rescuing injured civilians in Kupwara. A road in Bangalore named after Akshay was inaugurated on Dec 16, 2018. He was conferred the Desh Ratna Award by Rotary Mysore Midtown in 2017.

== Controversy ==
Akshay was recommended for but not conferred the Shaurya Chakra, a gallantry award posthumously as is commonly observed for similar cases. A formal appeal was made to Ministry of Defence (India) which ordered an enquiry into the matter at the behest of the then Raksha Mantri. It was ascertained that no review policy was currently in place for gallantry awards in India. Details of the reason for disregarding the original recommendation were not disclosed in public records.
