= Nagrota =

- Town
- Location in Jammu and Kashmir, India Nagrota (India)
- Coordinates: 32.81667°N 74.91667°E
- Country: India
- State: Jammu and Kashmir
- District: Jammu

Population (2011)
  - Total: 19,998

Languages
  - Official: Dogri, Dogri, Urdu, English
  - Other: Punjabi
- Time zone: UTC+5:30 (IST)
- PIN: 181221
- Telephone code: 0191
- Vehicle registration: JK
- Nearest city: Jammu
- Climate: Moderate (Köppen)

Nagrota is a town located in the Jammu district of Indian-administered Jammu and Kashmir in India in the disputed Kashmir region. It is located on National highway 44 between Jammu city and Udhampur. It is situated on the bank of River Tawi. Nagrota along with Kashmiri Pandit Migrant town of Jagti straddle the national highway. Nagrota is the first shrine stoppage for Shri Mata Vaishno Devi. The Kol-Kandoli temple is a mandate for completing the Shri Mata Vaishno Devi pilgrimage. Nagrota has an extension of Jammu Industries having Oil Depots and Godowns.It serves as headquarter of the XVI Corps (India) also known as the 'White Knight Corp'.

Though Nagrota does not have a railway station, it does have a Railway Station Code assigned (NGRT) in preparation for the completion of the planned Jammu-Srinagar railway extension.

Nagrota is also home to Sainik School and an I.I.T College, Sainik School Nagrota, alongside the Indian Institute of Technology, Jammu. It has an army park called Vijay Park, and a National Rural Health Mission and a KNH Hospital which is under stay.

Nagrota features a humid subtropical climate (Köppen Cwa), similar to neighboring Jammu City. Winters are cool and frequently foggy during mornings and nights, with average winter minimum temperatures typically ranging between 4 °C to 8 °C. Summers are hot and dry, with temperatures frequently crossing 40 °C prior to the arrival of the monsoon. The absolute lowest temperature officially recorded in the immediate Jammu district area is 0.5 °C (32.9 °F), which occurred during a historic cold wave on 24 January 2016.

== Geography ==
Nagrota is about 14km ahead of Jammu city on NH44.The town is located on uneven low valleys in the Trikuta hills on one side and river Tawi on the other side. Nagrota has an average elevation of 412m above sea level.

== Demographics ==
As of 2011, Nagrota had a population of 19,998 while the twin town of Jagti, made for Kashmiri migrants, had a population of around 14,000-18000. Jagti township has total of 176 buildings with 24 flats in each building. Jagti township has a total of 4224 flats.

== Religion ==
Religious composition of the population
1. Hindu (89.3%)
2. Sikh (4.39%)
3. Muslim (5.31%)
4. Others (1.01%)

== Cantonment ==
There is the Nagrota Cantonment located in Nagrota, which is the home of the 16 Corps, India's largest corp. In the terror attack in Nagrota by Jaish-e-Mohammed on 29/11/2016, Major Akshay Girish defended 16 hostages.

== See also ==
- Jammu
- Jammu tavi
- Talab Tillo
- Samba, Jammu
- Kathua
- Jammu Cantonment
- Hiranagar
- Akhnoor
