= Government Degree College, Bhaderwah =

- Type: Degree College
- Established: 1955
- Academic affiliations: University of Jammu
- Location: Bhaderwah, Jammu and Kashmir, India
- Campus: Rural
- Website: https://gdcbhadarwah.ac.in/

Government Degree College, Bhaderwah is a co-educational general degree college in Bhaderwah, Doda district, Jammu and Kashmir, India. This college serves the people of Bhaderwah in the Doda district and its adjoining areas. This college was established in 1955 which makes it one of the oldest colleges in Jammu and Kashmir. This college offers courses in arts and science. It is affiliated to University of Jammu.
