= Kathua =

- City
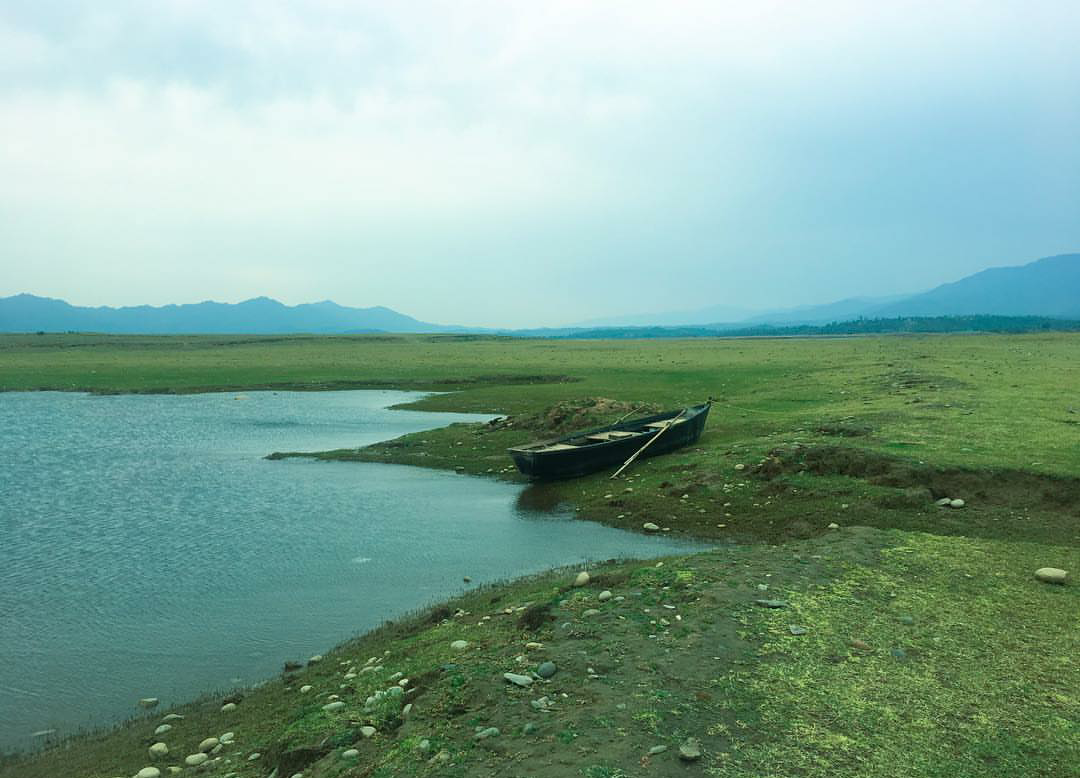
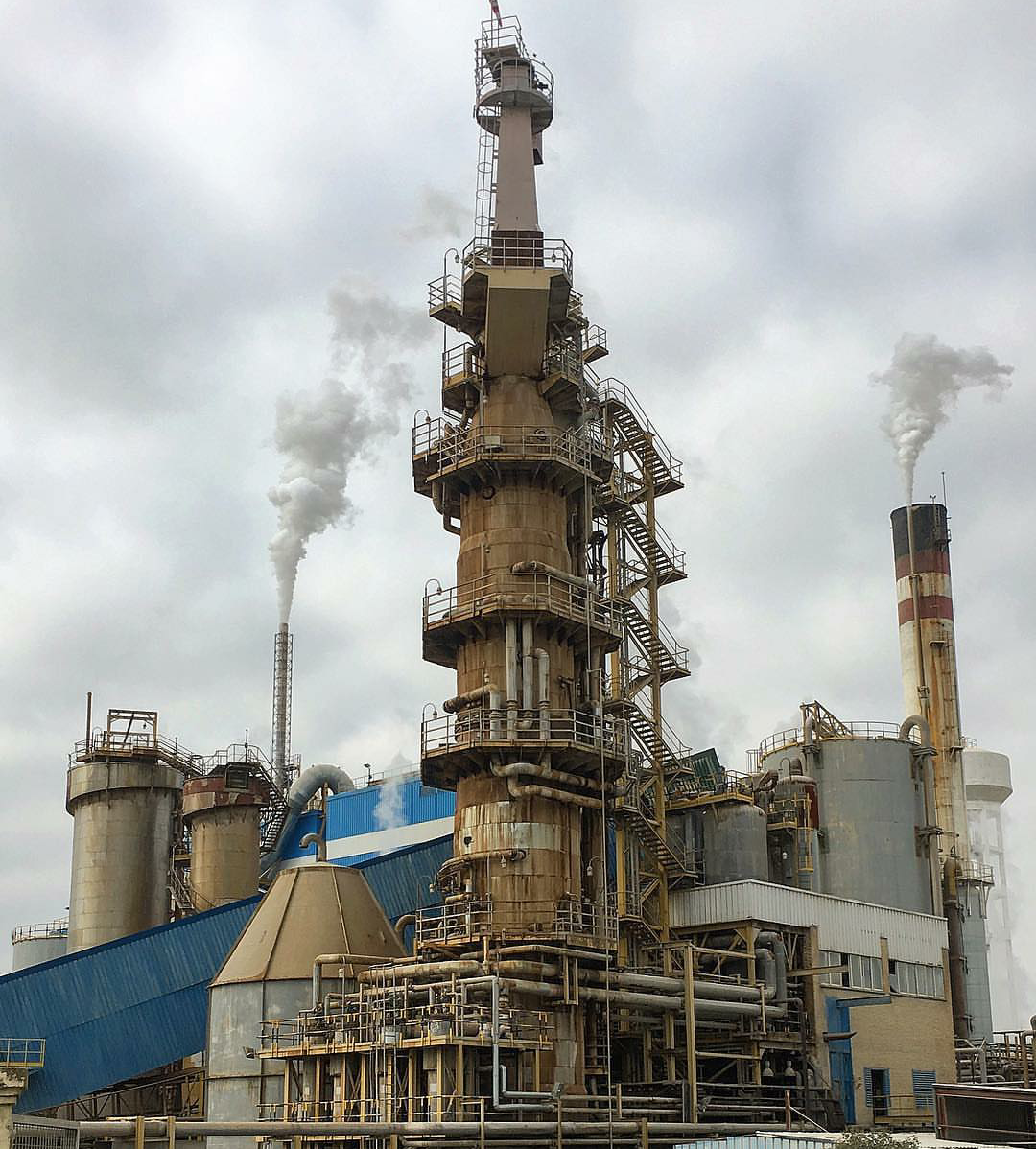
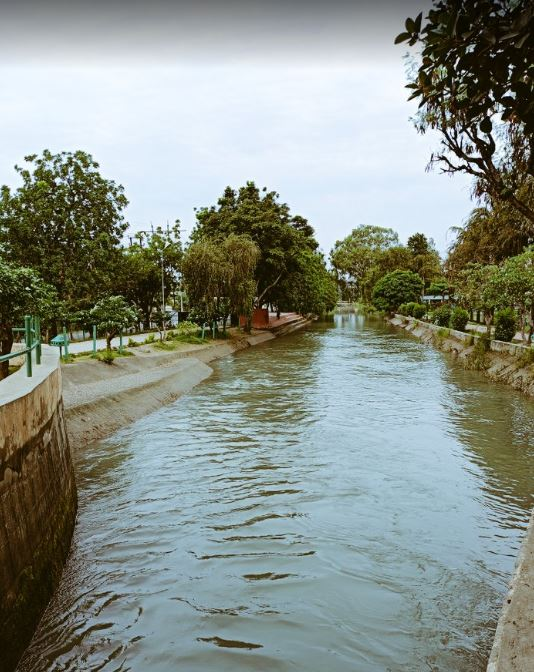
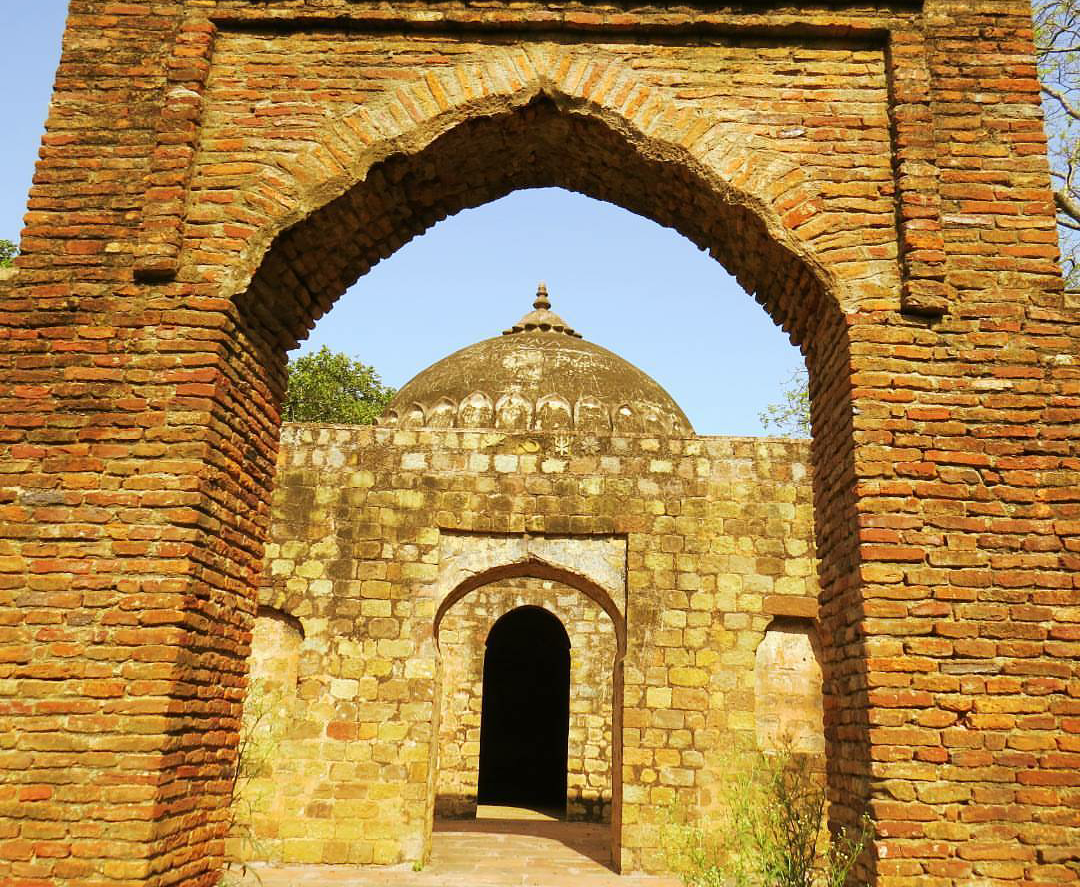
- Clockwise from top left: Purthu artificial beach, Industrial Estate, View of canal near Kathua Waterfront, Jasrota Fort

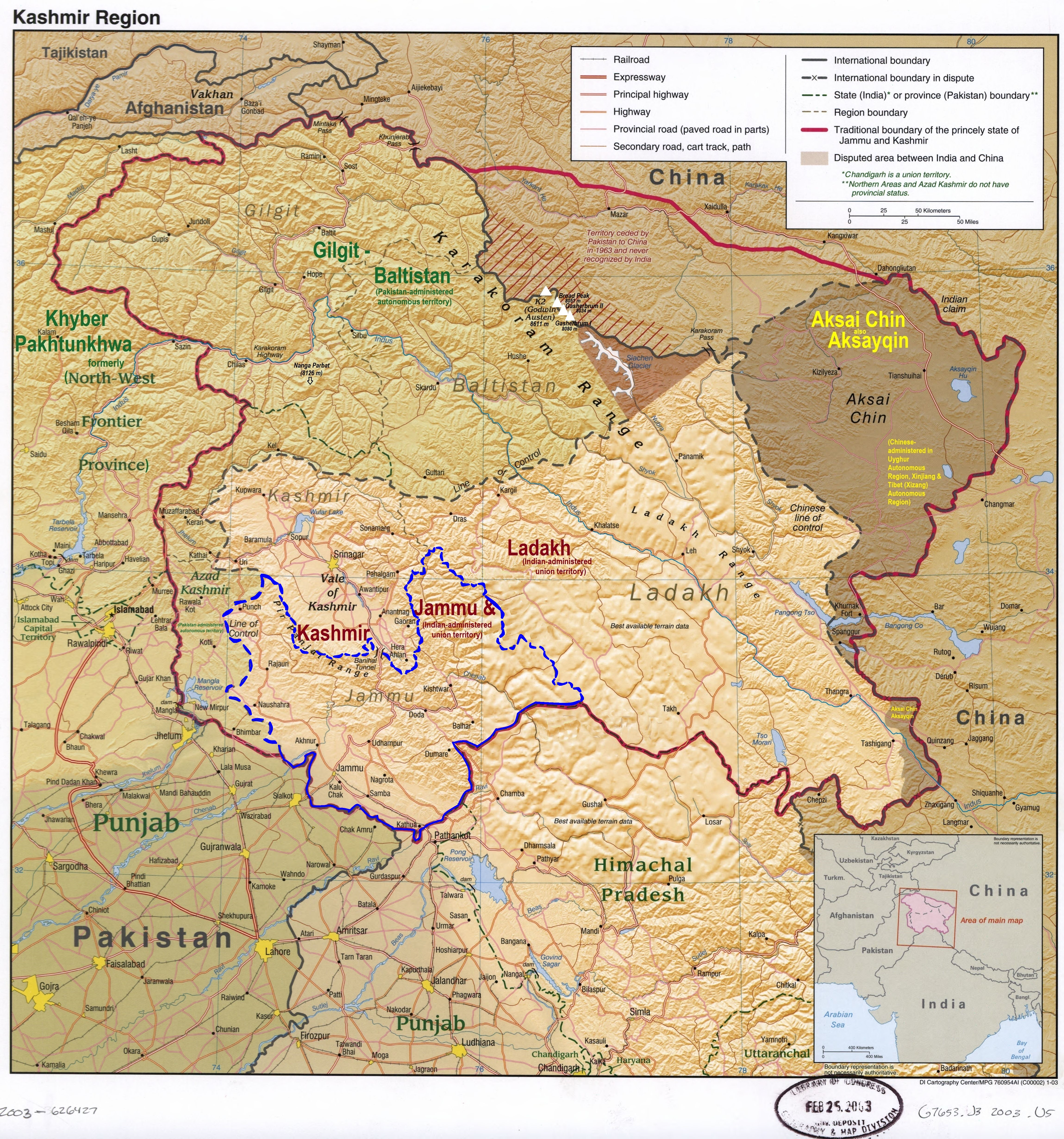
- Kathua lies in the Jammu division (neon blue) of the Indian-administered Jammu and Kashmir (shaded in tan) in the disputed Kashmir region.
- Interactive map of Kathua
- Coordinates: 32.385°N 75.517°E
- Administering country: India
- Union territory: Jammu and Kashmir
- District: Kathua
- Settled: 1025 BC
- Named for: "KATHAI"

Government
  - Type: Municipal Council
  - Body: Kathua Municipal Council (21) Seats
  - Chairman Municipal Council: Naresh Sharma (BJP)

Area
  - Total: 28.32 km^{2} (10.93 sq mi)
- Elevation: 393 m (1,289 ft)

Population (2011)
  - Total: 59,866
  - Density: 3,765/km^{2} (9,750/sq mi)

Languages
  - Spoken: Dogri, Hindi and Urdu
- Time zone: UTC+5:30 (IST)
- PIN: 184101(HEAD OFFICE), 184104(Mini Secretariat)
- Telephone code: 01922
- Literacy: 86.46%
- Website: http://kathua.nic.in/

Kathua is a city and municipal council of the Jammu division of Indian-administered Jammu and Kashmir in the disputed Kashmir region. The city is the headquarters of Kathua district and is divided into 27 wards which constitute the Kathua Municipal Council. It is situated along NH-44. The city has a bustling industrial area and an army cantonment adjoining it. Being a transit hub for industrial activity in the state, the city has a large industrial base with a textile park, biotechnology and pharma industrial and research park, cement industry, and many medium-scale MSMEs.

== Geography ==
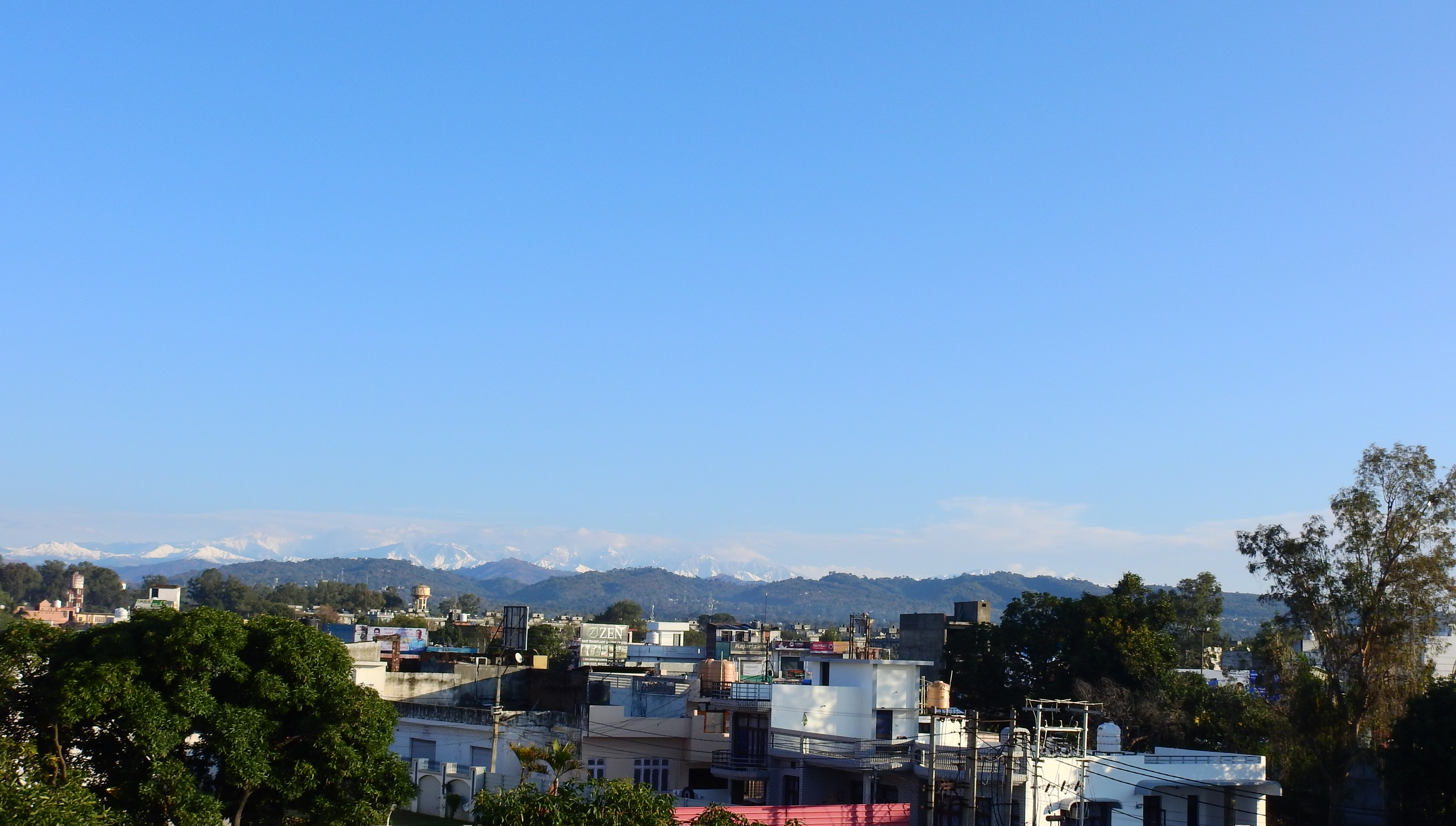
View of the Shivalik foothills and distant snow-capped Kailash Kund Range from Kathua town

Kathua is located at 32.37°N 75.52°E, at the foothills of Sivaliks. It has an average elevation of 393 metres (1,289 ft). The city is surrounded by three rivers. Ravi is 7 km (4.3 mi) down Kathua while Ujjh is about 11 km (6.8 mi) ahead on Jammu Highway. Kathua itself is situated along the banks of a khad (Dogri term for seasonal stream or rivulet), dividing it into two boroughs: Parliwand, meaning the other side; and Orliwand, meaning this side. Itself being a Plain the area is surrounded in the North by Sivalik hills and snow-capped Kailash Kund range. The large Ranjit Sagar Lake is 25 kms away and has a cooling effect on its climate. Kathua lies 88 kilometres south of Jammu.

== Demographics ==
Religion in Kathua City (2011)
1. Hinduism (91.3%)
2. Sikhism (4.75%)
3. Islam (2.68%)
4. Christianity (1.09%)
5. Buddhism (0.02%)
6. Jainism (0.01%)
7. Others (0.00%)
8. Not Stated (0.13%)

=== Population ===
- Total population of the Municipal Council and Outgrowth areas is 59,688 with 31,717 males and 28,149 females. The sex ratio is 888 women per 1000 men. There are 12,061 households in the Municipal Council and Outgrowth areas.

=== Literacy ===
- There are 46359 literates and 13,507 illiterates in the Municipal Council and Outgrowth areas resulting in an 86.46% literacy rate. The male and female literacy stand at 90.7% (25,605 indv.) and 81.75% (20,754) respectively.

=== Language ===
Use of Urdu is predominant in official government documents along with English, but Dogri is the mother tongue and the vernacular language of the populace along with Hindi.

=== Religion ===
Hinduism is the largest religion in Kathua, followed by over 91% of the people. Sikhism is the second-largest religion with 4.75% adherents. Christianity and Islam form 1.09% and 2.68% of the population respectively.

== Climate ==
Kathua has a monsoon-influenced humid subtropical climate (Köppen Cwa).Kathua generally experiences extreme rainfall during the monsoon being on the windward side of Sivalik. Because of its proximity to rivers, the climate is moderate to very hot in summers and mild to very cold in winters. Summers are hot and the temperature may reach 40 degrees, while in winters, the temperature can dip to below 0 degrees at nights.

Heavy downpour is experienced during the monsoon season in July and August. The annual rainfall is around 1,700 millimetres (67 in), mainly in monsoons and winters. Heavy hailstorms may be experienced in February and March, but are very rare; Kathua does not experience snowfall. Fog and sometimes Smog occur regularly during the winters, especially in January and February.

Compared with Jammu, temperatures in Kathua remain fairly lower by 3-4 degrees, a difference attributed to its higher elevation and proximity to the rivers and lake. December and January can be very cold especially nights, while February to April and October- November remain pleasant and dry. August is generally humid and sometimes very uncomfortable. Winters are also wet due to frequent rains due to western disturbances. Late night thunderstorms are common while May is notorious for heavy dust storms.

Climate data for Kathua (1991–2020)
Month	Jan	Feb	Mar	Apr	May	Jun	Jul	Aug	Sep	Oct	Nov	Dec	Year
Record high °C (°F)	30.4 (86.7)	29.4 (84.9)	36.8 (98.2)	43.6 (110.5)	45.8 (114.4)	48.0 (118.4)	42.5 (108.5)	39.0 (102.2)	38.8 (101.8)	39.6 (103.3)	32.2 (90.0)	28.5 (83.3)	48.0 (118.4)
Mean daily maximum °C (°F)	17.7 (63.9)	21.4 (70.5)	26.5 (79.7)	32.9 (91.2)	37.7 (99.9)	37.6 (99.7)	34.3 (93.7)	33.1 (91.6)	32.7 (90.9)	30.7 (87.3)	26.3 (79.3)	20.6 (69.1)	29.2 (84.6)
Mean daily minimum °C (°F)	6.3 (43.3)	9.2 (48.6)	13.2 (55.8)	17.9 (64.2)	22.5 (72.5)	24.6 (76.3)	24.9 (76.8)	24.4 (75.9)	22.8 (73.0)	17.3 (63.1)	11.7 (53.1)	7.4 (45.3)	16.8 (62.2)
Record low °C (°F)	−1.8 (28.8)	0.2 (32.4)	5.6 (42.1)	9.2 (48.6)	12.2 (54.0)	17.6 (63.7)	14.0 (57.2)	14.0 (57.2)	11.5 (52.7)	7.4 (45.3)	3.6 (38.5)	0.0 (32.0)	−1.8 (28.8)
Average rainfall mm (inches)	54.6 (2.15)	70.8 (2.79)	64.2 (2.53)	37.4 (1.47)	24.2 (0.95)	122.2 (4.81)	390.5 (15.37)	451.2 (17.76)	133.2 (5.24)	25.6 (1.01)	15.9 (0.63)	25.8 (1.02)	1,415.7 (55.74)
Average rainy days	3.0	4.0	4.2	2.8	2.3	7.0	12.8	13.0	6.1	1.6	0.8	1.8	59.4
Average relative humidity (%)	88	83	73	57	48	61	83	88	83	77	82	87	76
Source: India Meteorological Department

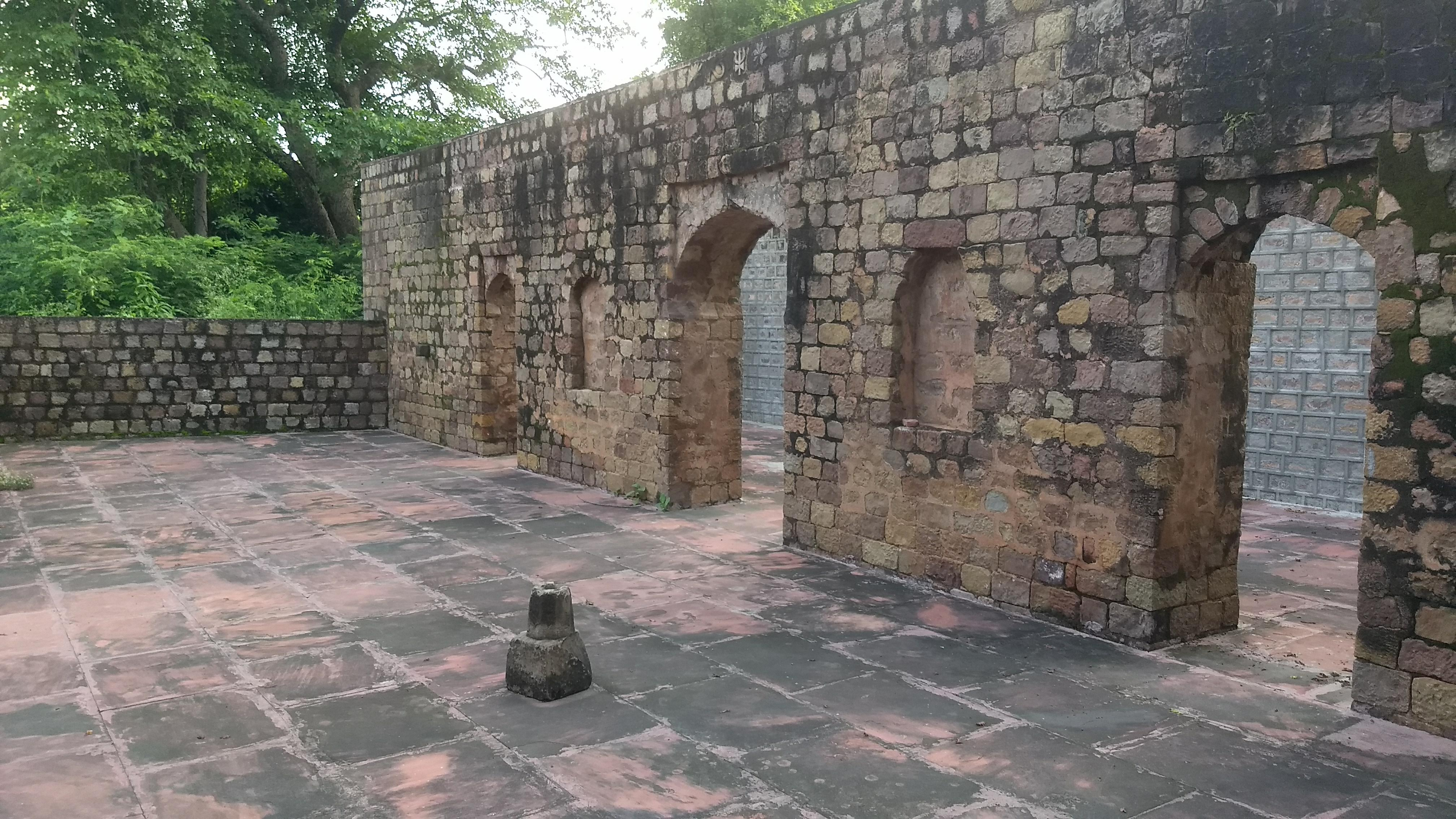
Fort complex at Jasrota

== Transport ==
Kathua is 80 km (50 mi) away from Jammu city and 120 km (75 mi) from Katra. Interstate and Intrastate road transport is easily accessible due to the close proximity to NH44. Jammu Airport is the nearest major airport with regular flights. The town is connected by Indian railways to all major cities of India. Intra-district transport is also easily available for travelling within the town and surrounding areas.

== Gallery ==
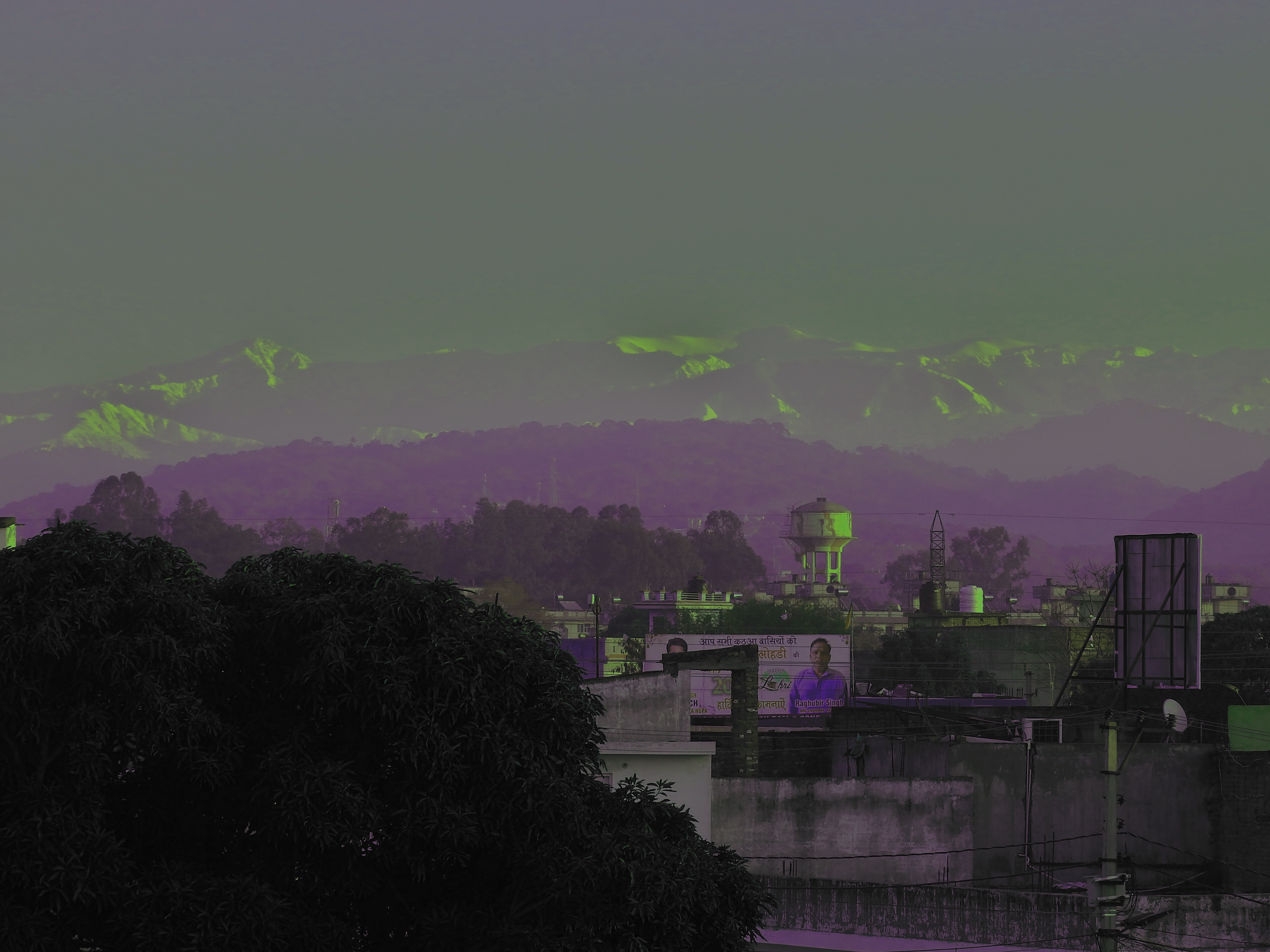
Kaplas Massif is visible from Kathua town on clear mornings

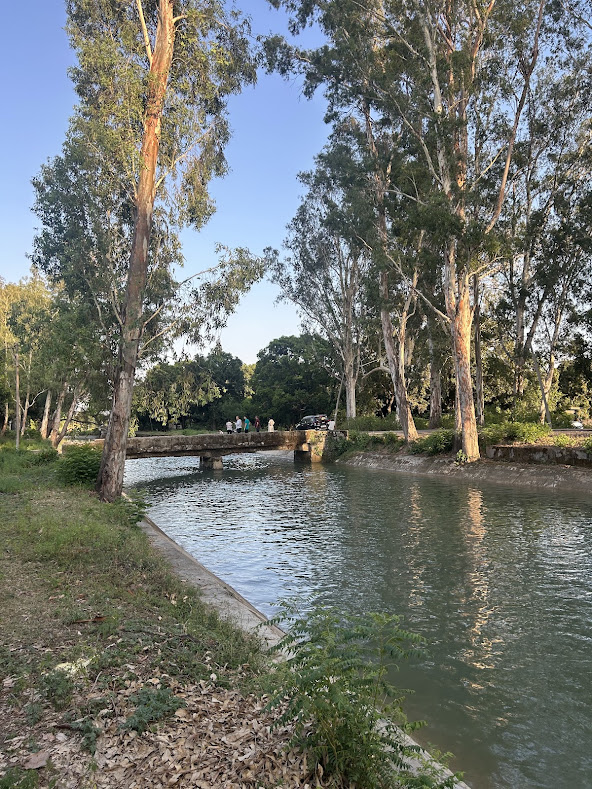
Water canal traversing the town of Kathua

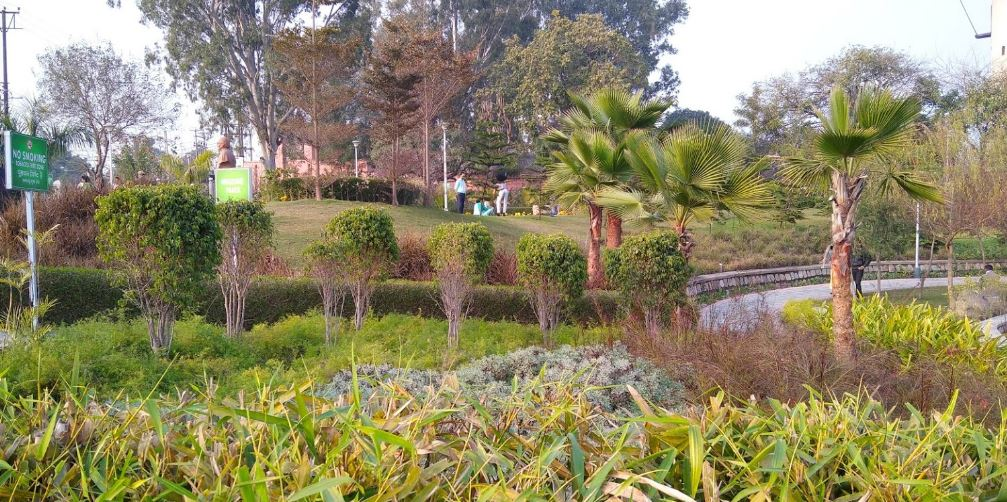
K.K. Birla Garden, Kathua

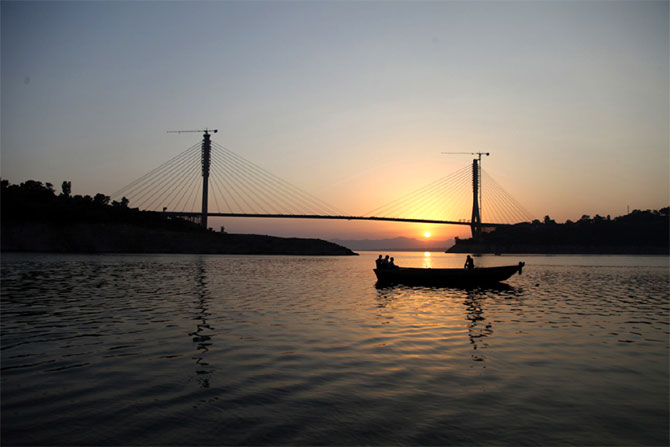
Atal Setu bridge on Ravi river

== See also ==
- Akhnoor
- Hiranagar
- Jammu
- Jammu Cantonment
- Nagrota
- Samba, Jammu
- Talab Tillo
