= Onagam =

Onagam Sailypur, Wanagam, Sonagam
- Village
- Location in Jammu and Kashmir, India Onagam (India)
- Coordinates: 34.43°N 74.60°E
- Country: India
- Union Territory: Jammu and Kashmir
- District: Bandipora

Population (2011)
  - Total: 5,373

Languages
  - Spoken: Kashmiri, Urdu
- Time zone: UTC+5:30 (IST)
- PIN: 193502

Onagam (also known as Wonagam or Sailypur) is a village on the banks of Badshah Canal (canal of zaingair) in Bandipora district, Jammu and Kashmir, India.

== Etymology ==
The name Onagam is derived from the word Wun, meaning jungle, and gam, meaning village. The name shows the forested nature of the area. Onagam is one of the biggest villages in Bandipora district.

The village situated on the banks of Badshah Canal (canal of Zaingair), located towards the north of Bandipora district, 2 km (1.2 mi) from the district headquarters, Surrounded by Panjigam from East, Putushay from the west, Duban from North, Qazipora from South, Turqpora from North West, and Kalusa from South East.

An irrigation canal divides the city into two halves. It was built by Badshah and was built to provide water to Zaingair. This canal is 47 km long and takes its water from the river Madhumati. It flows through Bandipore on the bank of the Wular Lake at Sonawari. It moves in loops till it enters Sopore

== Description ==
Onagam is one of the biggest villages in Bandipora district. It is situated on the banks of Badshah Canal (canal of Zaingair), located towards the north of Bandipora district, 2 km (1.2 mi) from the district headquarters, Surrounded by Panjigam from East, Putushay from the west, Duban from North, Qazipora from South, Turqpora from North West, and Kalusa from South East.

The Zaingair irrigation canal divides the city into two halves. It was built by Badshah and was built to provide water to Zaingair. This canal is 47 km long and takes its water from the river Madhumati.

== Mosques and religious places ==
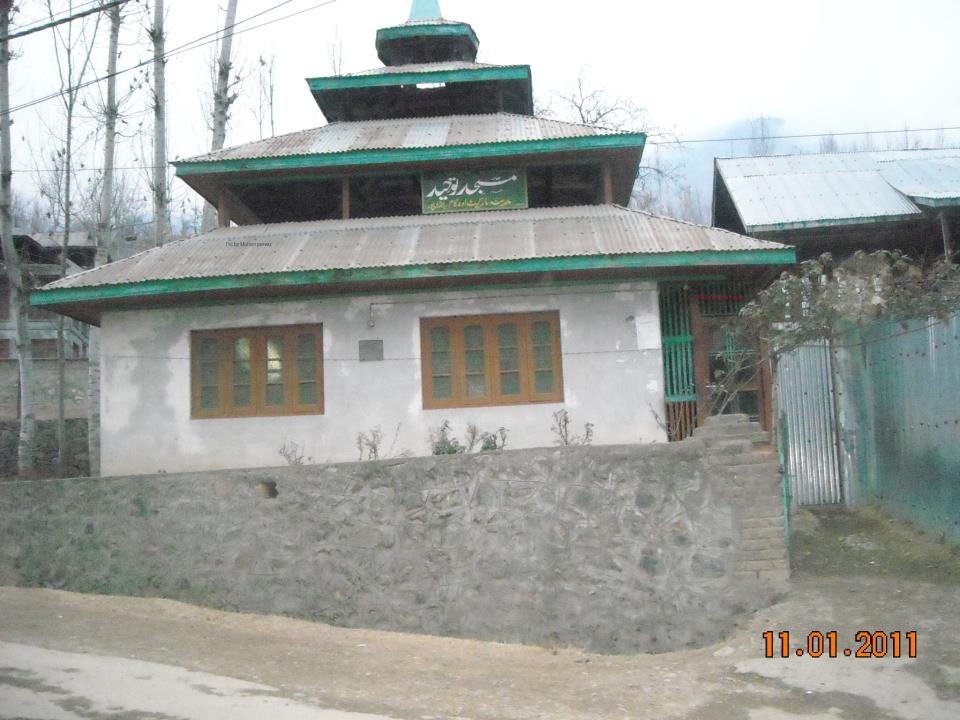
Masjid'e Tawheed, Sheikh Mohalla Onagam Bandipora

Jamia mosques

- Jamia Masjid (Old)
- Jamia Masjid Gundpora
- Jamia Masjid Wani Mohalla

Mosques (non Jamiah)

- Masjid Tawheed, Sheikh Mohalla Onagam
- Masjid, Malik & Lone Mohalla
- Masjid i Rehmania

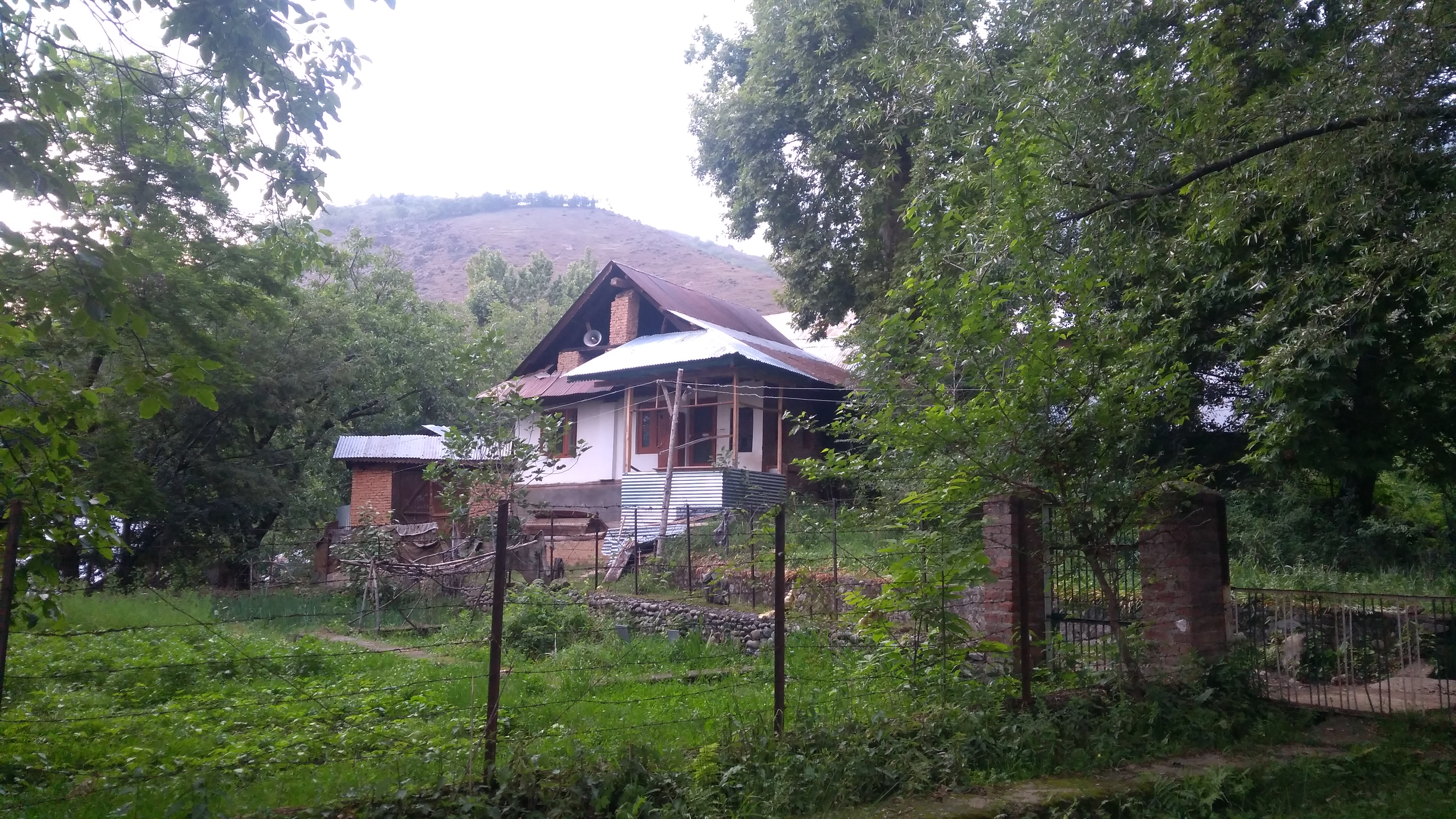

- Sofi Mohalla Masjid
- Ganie Mohalla Masjid
- Mirpur Masjid
- Sheikh Mohalla Mosque (Near to Old Jamia)

=== Eid Gah ===
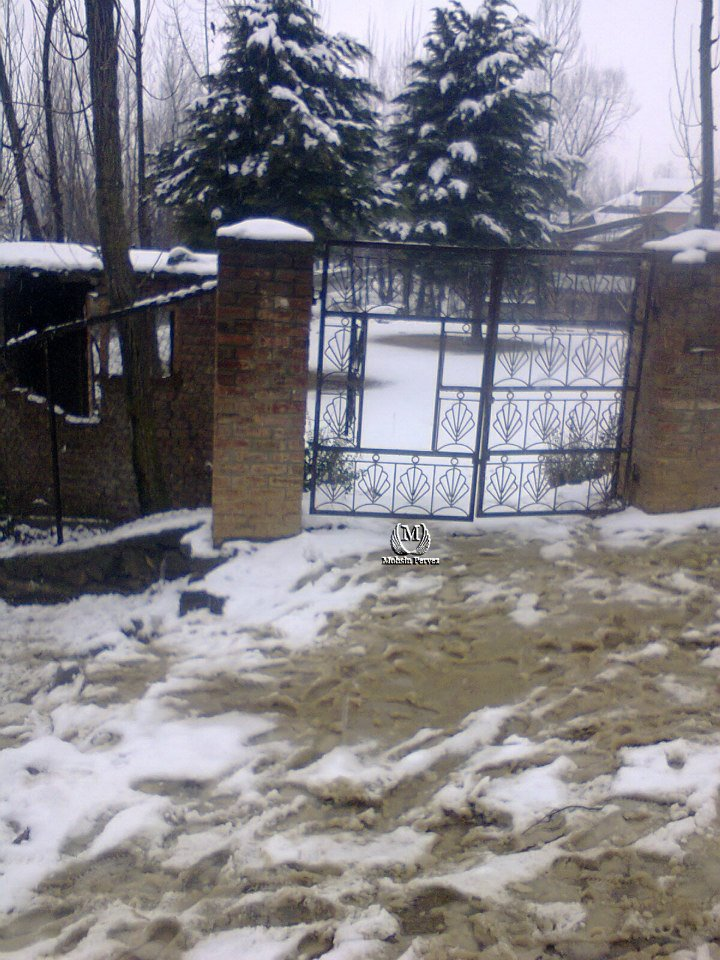
Eid Gah (Eid Prayer Ground), Onagam Bandipora. Photo Taken in December 2016

Onagam Bandipora has a prayer ground in the center of the village (next to some waterfalls). This ground is mainly used for Eid prayers, Janazah prayers, and social gatherings. The ground can accommodate more than 800 people at a time for Eid prayer.

== Attractions ==
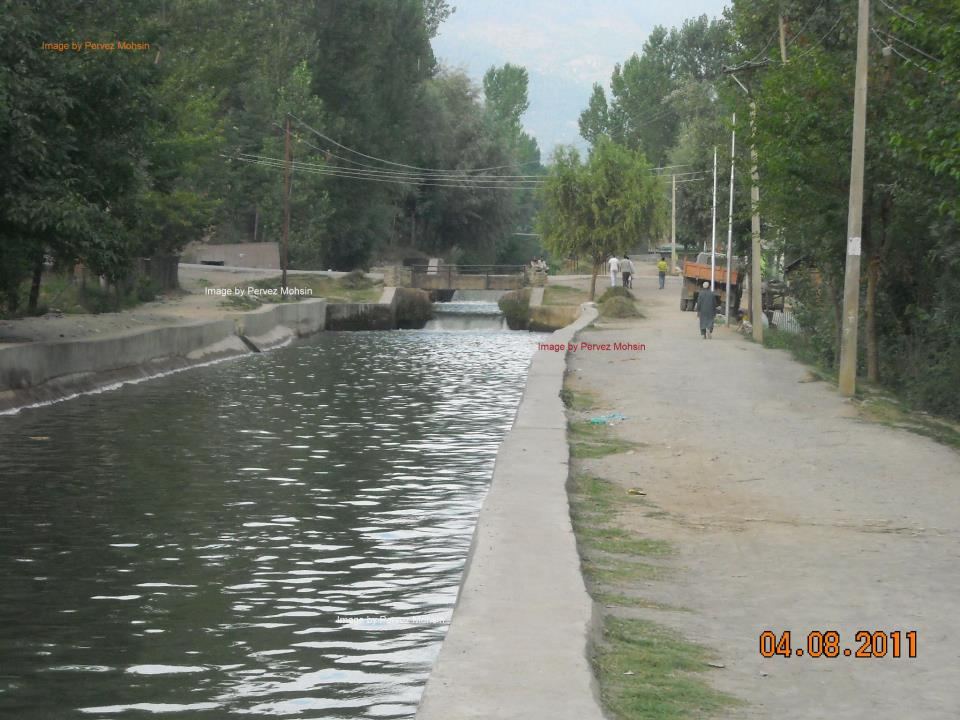
Zainager Canal in Onagam Bandipora

Waterfalls and Zainager Canal:

Zainager is a canal between the Wular lake and the Pohru river developed by Zain-ul-Abidin (1420-1470 A.D.) by raising a dam of boulders across the Pohru to provide water for irrigation in the tract. Zain-ul-Abdin constructed the Zainager Canal and started building places, the chaks, who appear to have remained untamed so far. The purpose of constructing Nehr-e-Zainager (Zainager Canal) was to irrigate Zainager, it originates from Sonarwani, and flows through Watrina, Panjigam, Onagam, Potushai and so on... and finally reaches to Zainager (village). It moves in loops till it enters Sopore irrigating about 13300 acres of land. It is 47 km long, takes its water from the river Madhumati.

Panchakki(Grutt- Kashmiri), also known as the water mill, is used to grind grain. The water mill is fed with sufficient water, the arrangement is such that the water is made to fall into the Chakki river's cistern from quite a height in order to generate the necessary power to drive the mill. Onagam's Panchakki is located near the twin waterfalls. The main water resource to this chakki is Nehr Zainagair (Budshah Canal). A few gallons of water are allowed to flow through a small stream towards the panchakki, and once the purpose of running the grinder is served, water is allowed to flow back into Badshah Canal. Onagam's Grutt keeps serving people from distant areas almost throughout the year. Except for Nov, Dec, and January. it keeps running throughout the year.

== Education and schools ==
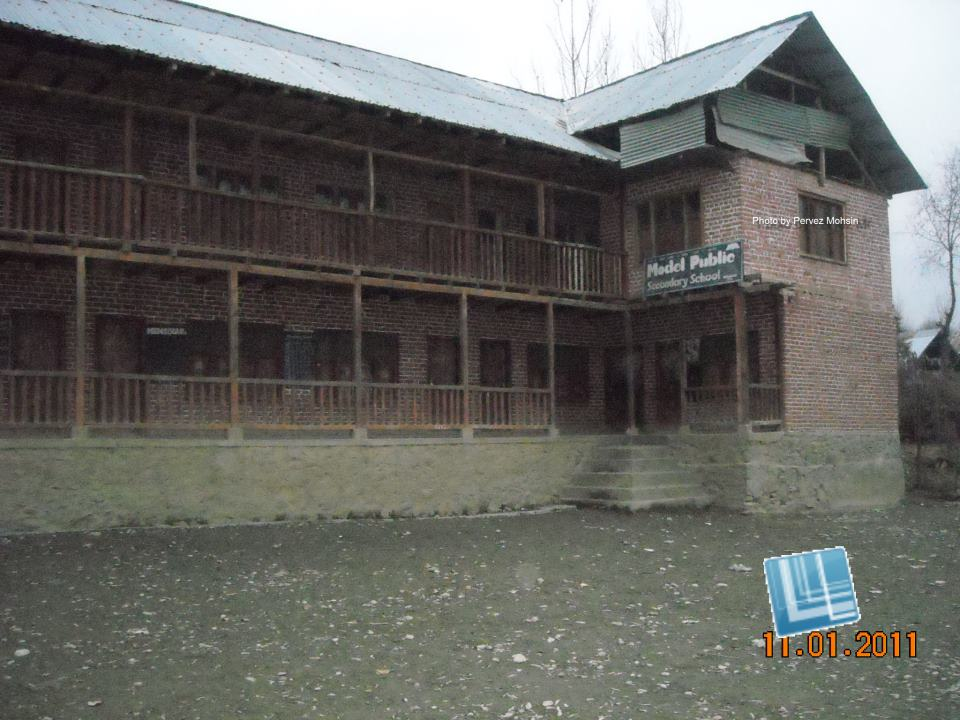
Model Public School, Onagam Bandipora

There are several schools and educational institutions in the village. These include:

- Govt Girls School, Onagam, The purpose of this school was to have a separate school for girls in the village.
- Govt High School, Onagam, This is one of the oldest schools established in the village. Generations have been educated in this school.
- Model Public School is the first English Medium school. In 1993 this school was shifted from Qazipora to Onagam and has remained in the village from then.

=== Faith schools ===
- Dar Ul-Uloom Raheemiyyah, A branch of Dar Ul-Uloom Raheemiyyah was established in the village in 2014. The purpose of this school was to ensure villagers had access to Hafiz coursework, in order to memorise the Quran.
- Darasgah Jamiah, "This institution has been there from ages" and has been educating the children (Boys in the morning and Girls in the evening) and making sure that every child of the village is able to read the Quran
- Darasgan Tawheed, This institution was established a few years back and the purpose was to make sure that children don't need to travel to the other side of the village. Sheikh Mohalla built a separate building to serve the purpose.

== Notable people ==
- Ahmadullah Affandi, also known as 'Baba-e-J&K Scouting', was a national award-winning scout of Jammu and Kashmir who came from Onagam.
