= Botingoo =

- Town
- Location in Jammu and Kashmir, India Botingoo (India)
- Coordinates: 34.3868°N 74.5252°E
- Country: India
- Union territory: Jammu and Kashmir
- District: Baramulla

Languages
  - Official: Kashmiri, Urdu, Hindi, Dogri, English
- Time zone: UTC+5:30 (IST)
- PIN: 193201

Botingoo is a village in the Zaingair area of Sopore in Baramulla District in the Indian union territory of Jammu and Kashmir.
