= Wahipora Langate =

Village in Jammu and Kashmir, India

Wahipora Wahipora Langate
- Village
- Location in Jammu and Kashmir, India Wahipora (India)
- Coordinates: 34.38°N 74.37°E
- Country: India
- Union territory: Jammu and Kashmir
- District: Kupwara
- Tehsil: Langate
- Elevation: 1,608 m (5,276 ft)

Population (2011)
  - Total: 1,576

Languages
  - Official: Kashmiri, Urdu, Hindi, English
- Time zone: UTC+5:30 (IST)
- PIN: 193302

Wahipora or Wahipor is a Notified Area and a village in Langate tehsil of Kupwara district in union territory of Jammu and Kashmir, India. It is located 18 kilometres (11 mi) towards South from district headquarters Kupwara and 68 kilometres (42 mi) from summer capital of the union territory, Srinagar.

== Geography ==
It is located around 25 km (16 mi) to the south of district headquarters and 65 km (40 mi) from Srinagar. It is surrounded by Rafiabad tehsil towards the South, Lolab towards the North, Zaingair tehsil towards the East, Langate and Handwara towards the West. Sopore, Baramulla and Srinagar are the closest cities.

== Economy ==
People of the village are mainly dependent on agriculture and horticulture. There are two public sector bank branches in the village viz The Jammu and Kashmir bank and Grameen bank.
