= Hathlangoo =

Hathlangoo Hathlang
- Village
- The Hundred Branches
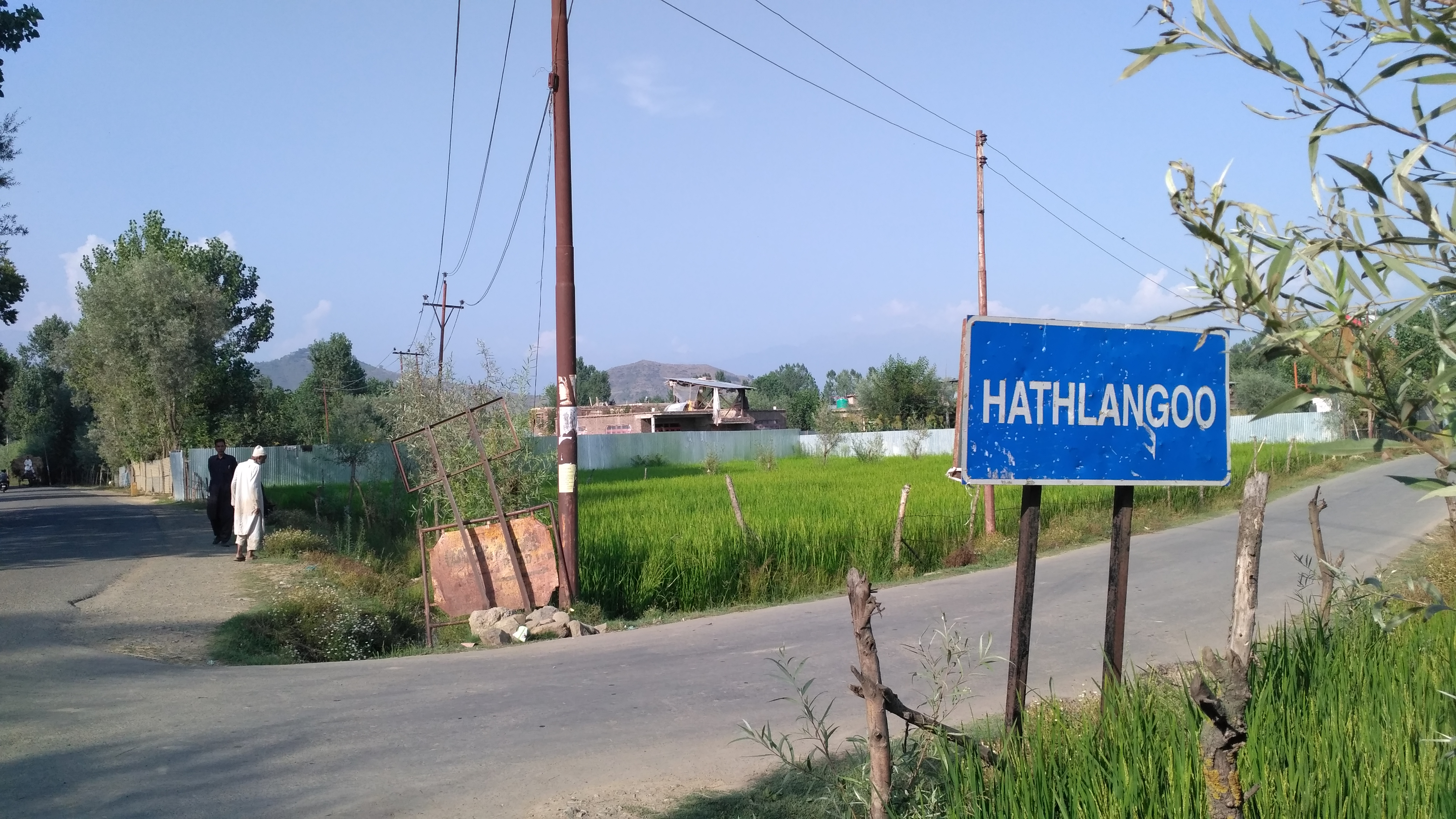
- The Entrance Road to the Village

- Location in Jammu and Kashmir, India Hathlangoo (India)
- Coordinates: 34.3456°N 74.5039°E
- Country: India
- Union Territory: Jammu & Kashmir
- District: Baramulla
- Tehsil: Sopore

Area
  - Total: 5.24 km^{2} (2.02 sq mi)

Population
  - Total: 2,988

Languages
  - Official: Kashmiri, Urdu, Hindi, English
- Time zone: UTC+05:30 (IST)
- PIN: 193201
- Telephone Code: 01954
- Vehicle registration: JK-05
- Literacy: 63.08%
- Village Code: 002191
- Website: barammulla.nic.in

Hathlangoo or Hathlang (English: The Hundred Branches) anteriorly kenned as Hashmatpora is a village in the Sopore tehsil of Baramulla district, in the Indian union territory of Jammu and Kashmir. It is located 8 km (5.0 mi) away from sub-district headquarter Sopore and 22 km (14 mi) away from district headquarters Baramulla. It is one of the most immensely colossal village in Zaingair. The Hathlangoo village has Janwara Village in the South, Magraypora in the North, Botingoo in the Northwest, Malmapanpora in the West and Wular Lake in the East.

== Etymology ==
The name Hathlangoo is a Kashmiri word composed of two words: Hath betokens (hundred) and Lang/Langoo designates (branches). The predecessors of this village verbally expressed that there was a chinar tree in the village which had a hundred branches and then the elders of the village utilized this as a secondary name for the village initially designated as Hashmatpora. That chinar tree is still present in the cemetery of the village. Later on, with the passing of time, the secondary name of the village aeonianly superseded the pristine denomination.

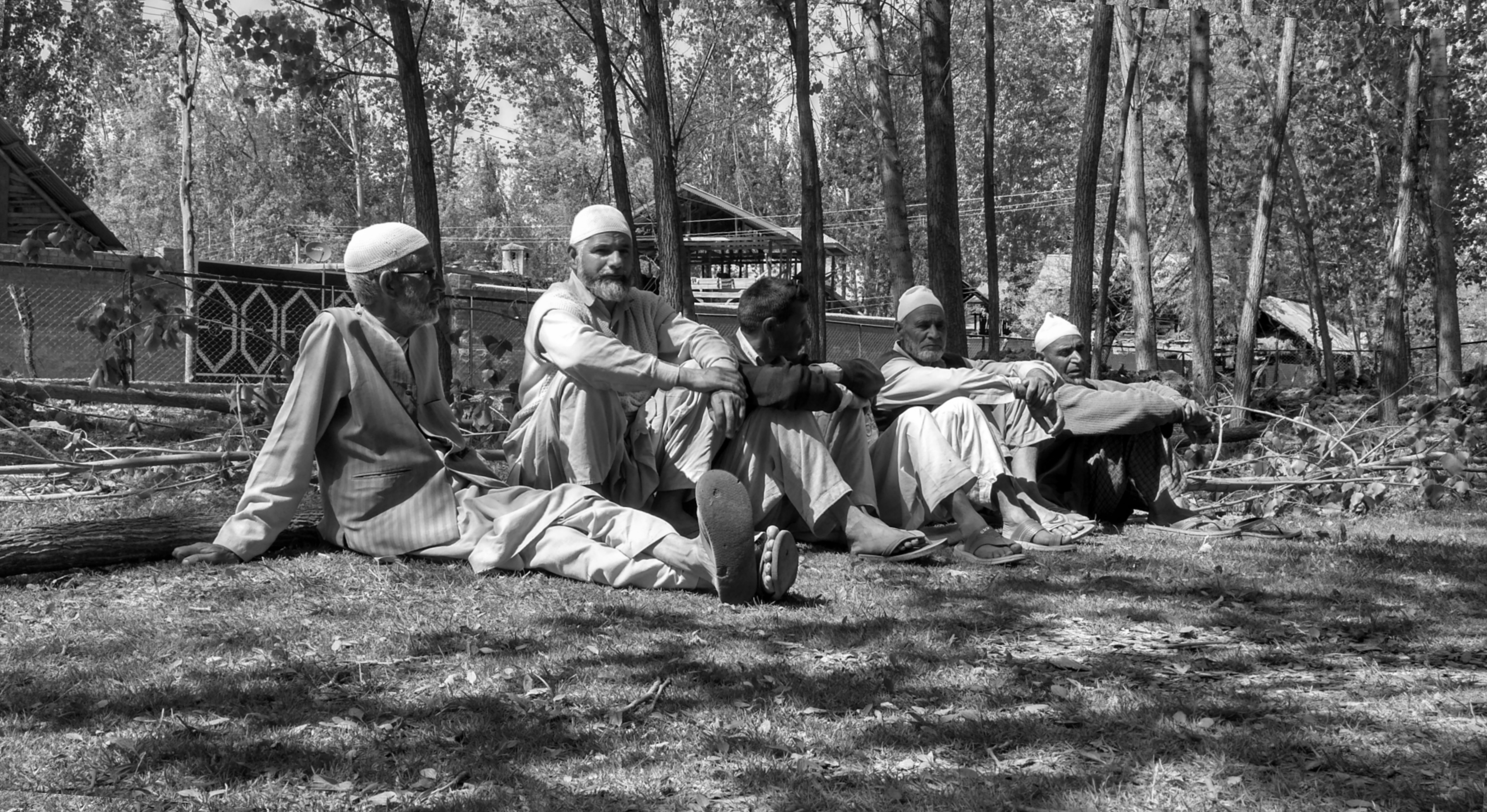
People of the village in Traditional dress

== Geography ==
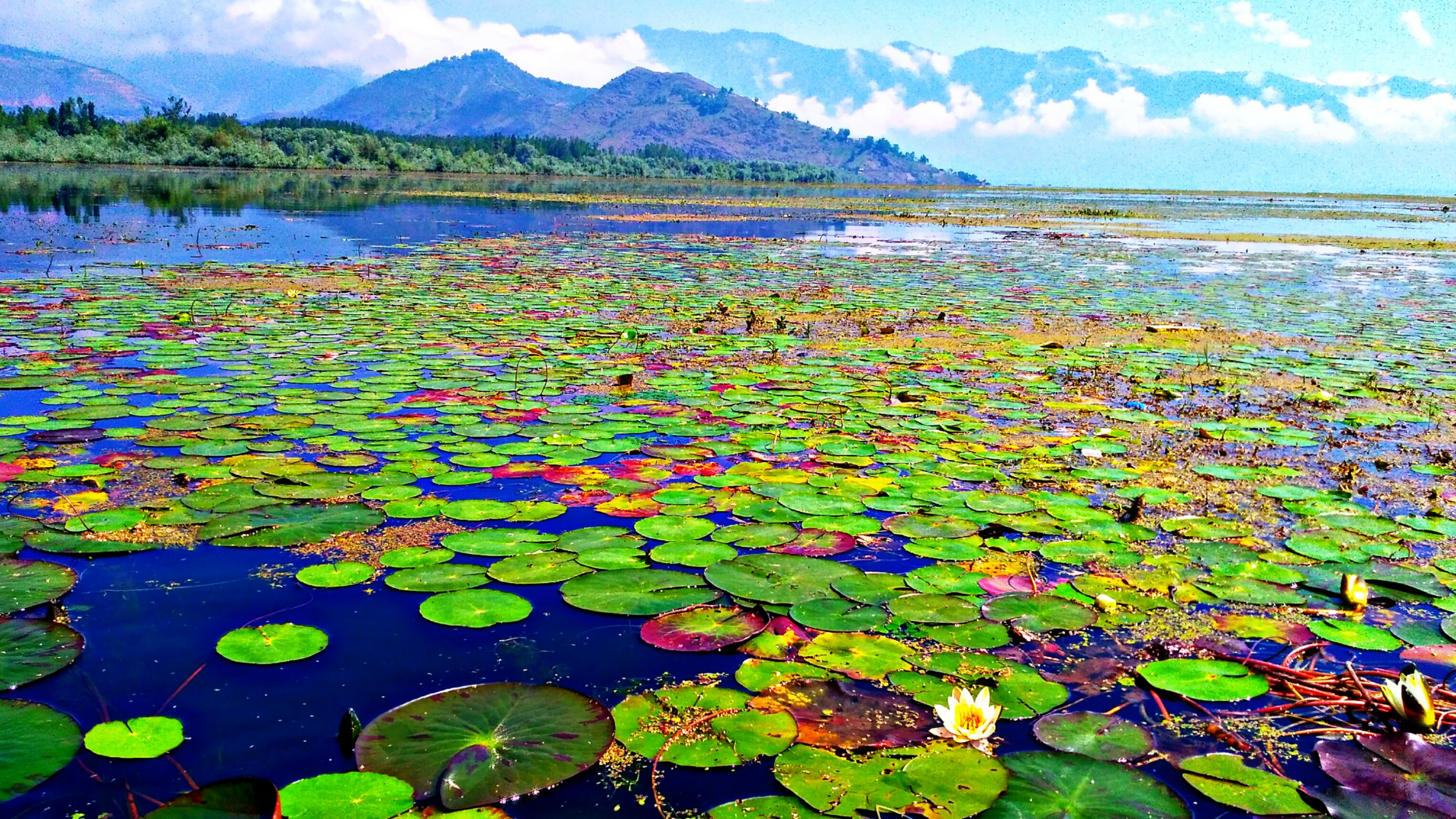
Resplendent View of Wular Lake and Baba Shukur Din Hill From Hathlangoo Social Forestry

Hathlangoo is located at 34.3456°N 74.5039°E. On the east side Hathlangoo is 1 km (0.62 mi) from Wular Lake, one of the most sizably voluminous freshwater lakes in Asia. On a hilltop on the north side is the Baba Shukur-ud-Din shrine.

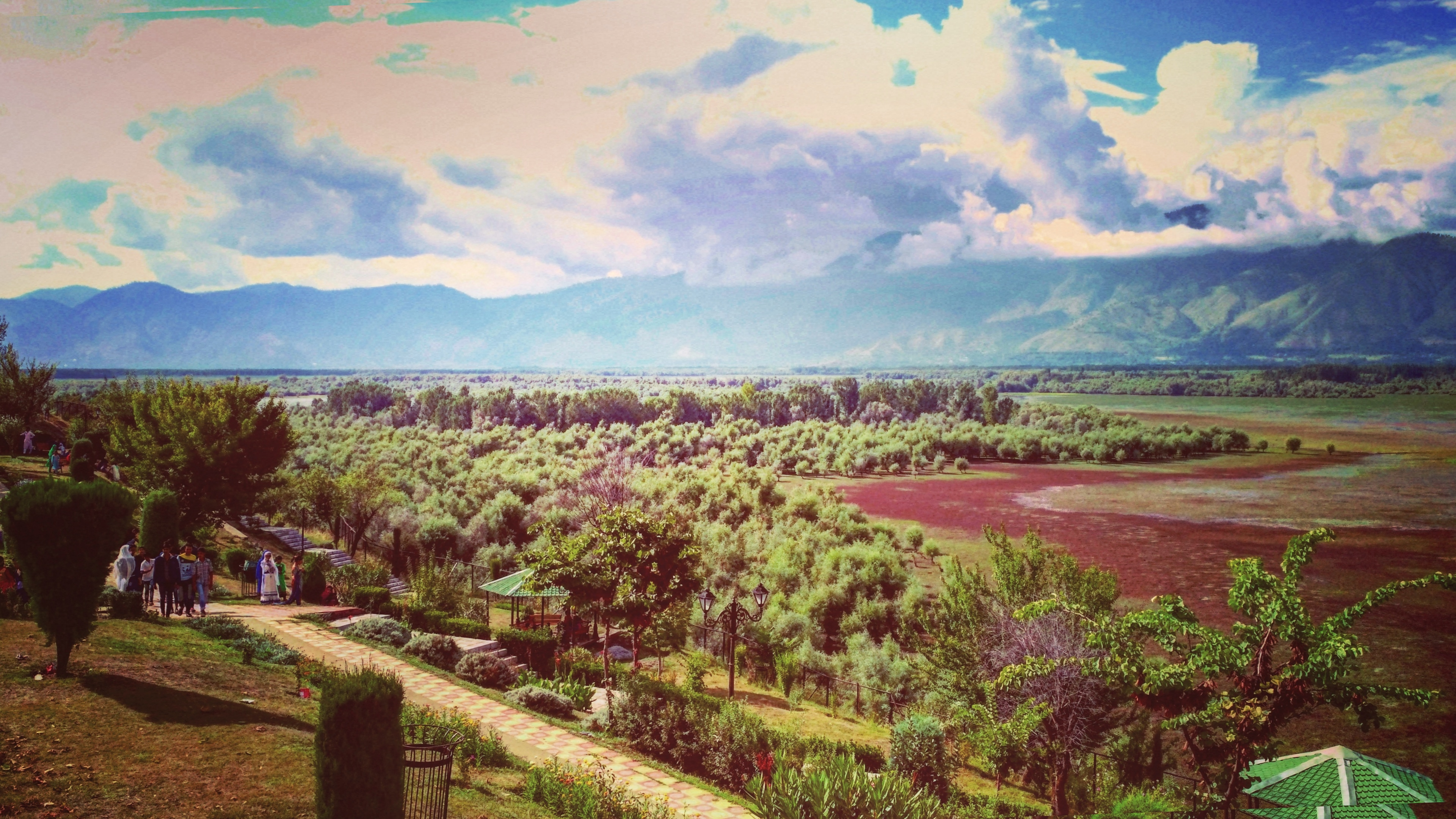

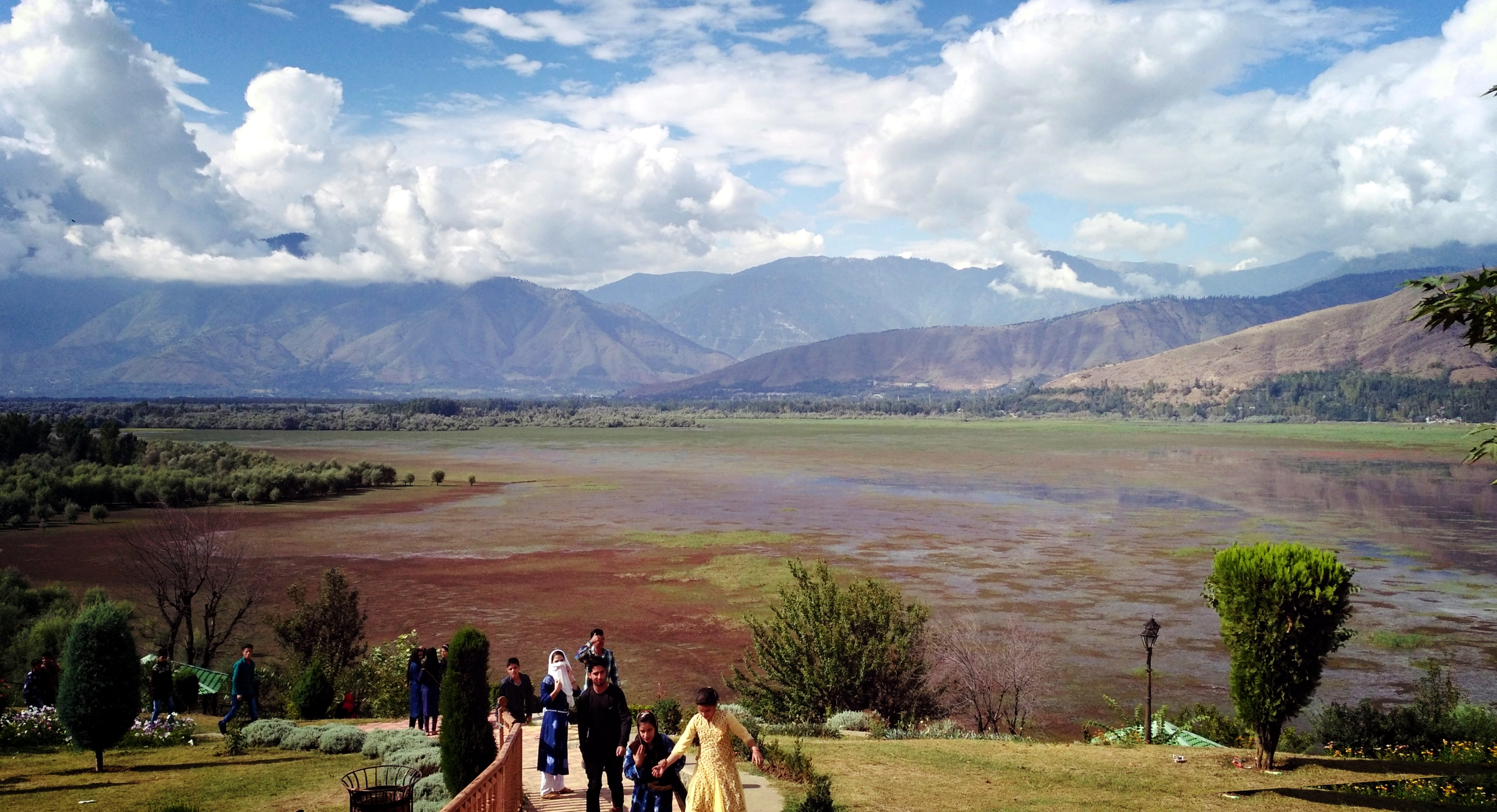
View of Wular Lake From Wular Vintage

== Demographics ==
The Hathlangoo village has a population of 2,988 out of which 1,522 are males while 1,466 are females as per Population Census 2011.

In Hathlangoo village, the population of children aged 0–6 is 388 which makes up 12.99% of the total population of the village. The Average Sex Ratio of Hathlangoo village is 963 which is higher than the Jammu and Kashmir state average of 889. The child Sex Ratio for the Hasmat Pora as per census is 865, higher than the Jammu and Kashmir average of 862.

Hathlangoo village has a lower literacy rate compared to Jammu and Kashmir. In 2011, the literacy rate of Hashmat Pora village was 63.08% compared to 67.16% of Jammu and Kashmir. In Hathlangoo, Male literacy stands at 73.21% while female literacy rate was 52.72%.

== Castes In Hathlangoo Sopore ==
There are several Castes in Hathlangoo Sopore village, The DAR and LONE are the native castes of the village. The Forebears of these two Castes have lived there for many hundreds of years. Once only few families were living in this village which includes four families from DAR, two families from LONE Caste, one or two family from GANAI Caste and the other one or two from the MIR Caste.

Other Castes include WANI, GANAI, MIR, and BHAT. There are additionally other Castes residing in this Village among which the four families emanate from, the SHAH Caste, one family from the TANTARY Caste, one family from BABA caste, four families from the PARRAY caste. The WANI caste is the most migrated Community in the village which is believed that their Predecessors were migrated from the Southern components of Kashmir which once was called the MARAAZ. Now they have been living in the village for many decenniums.

== Educational Infrastructure ==
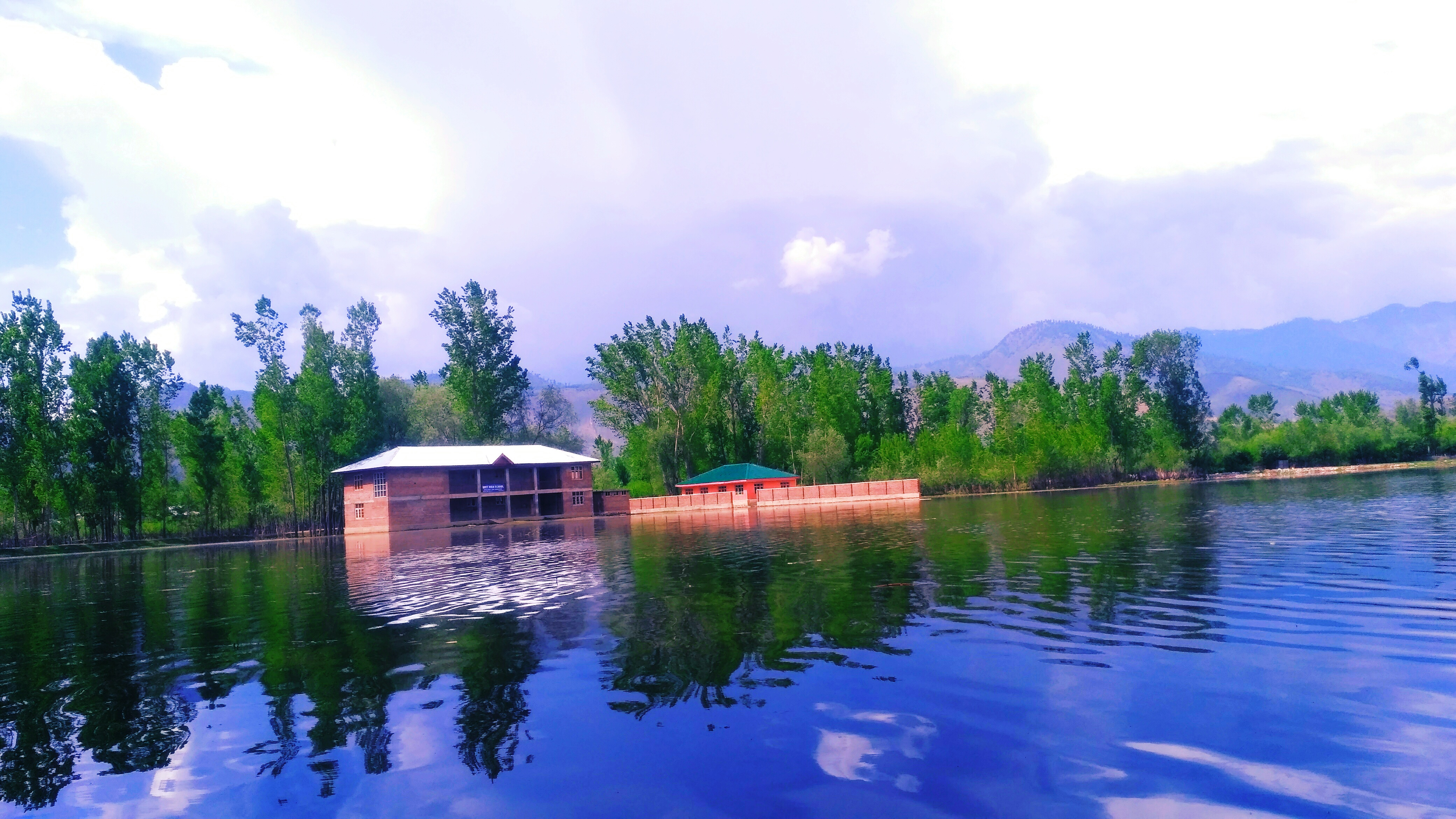
Front View of Govt. High School Hathlangoo During Spring Season @2017

The Indian government operates multiple public schools directly in Hathlangoo village, including one high school and one middle school and three primary SSA schools.

Government High School (HS) Hathlangoo was established in 1955. This state-run secondary school covers classes up to Grade 10. It features smart classrooms, a science laboratory, computer access, and a school playground.

Government Middle School (GMS / Girls Middle School) Hathlangoo was established in 1966. This government institution provides primary and upper-primary education from Grade 1 to Grade 8.

Primary Schools: Additional government centers operate within the village's neighbourhood wards (mohallas) to serve younger children locally.

For grades 11 and 12 (Higher Secondary) or university degrees, students from Hathlangoo travel a few kilometers to nearby government institutions such as Government Higher Secondary School Dangerpora or colleges in Sopore.

Bilal Memorial English Medium School is the only recognised private school operating in Hathlangoo.

In addition, small part-time village neighbourhood centers operate local maktab religious schools, such as Taleem Ul Quran Islamic center, dedicated to Quranic education. Neighbourhood maktabs hold classes early in the morning and after Asr, allowing children to learn the Quran, while being simultaneously enrolled full-time in either a government school or a private school during the day.

Additionally Hathlangoo contains state-funded book collections within government schools as well as a Central Public library where Islamic books are available to read. Students preparing for exams typically travel to nearby Warpora (home to The Reading Lounge Library) or into Sopore town to visit local libraries.

== Religious Places ==
There are Eight (8) mosques in this village, 5 of which are Jama Masjids All the people of this village are Muslims. Eid prayers are mostly offered in Markazi Eidgah which is located near Dar mohalla front side of the Central Cemetery.

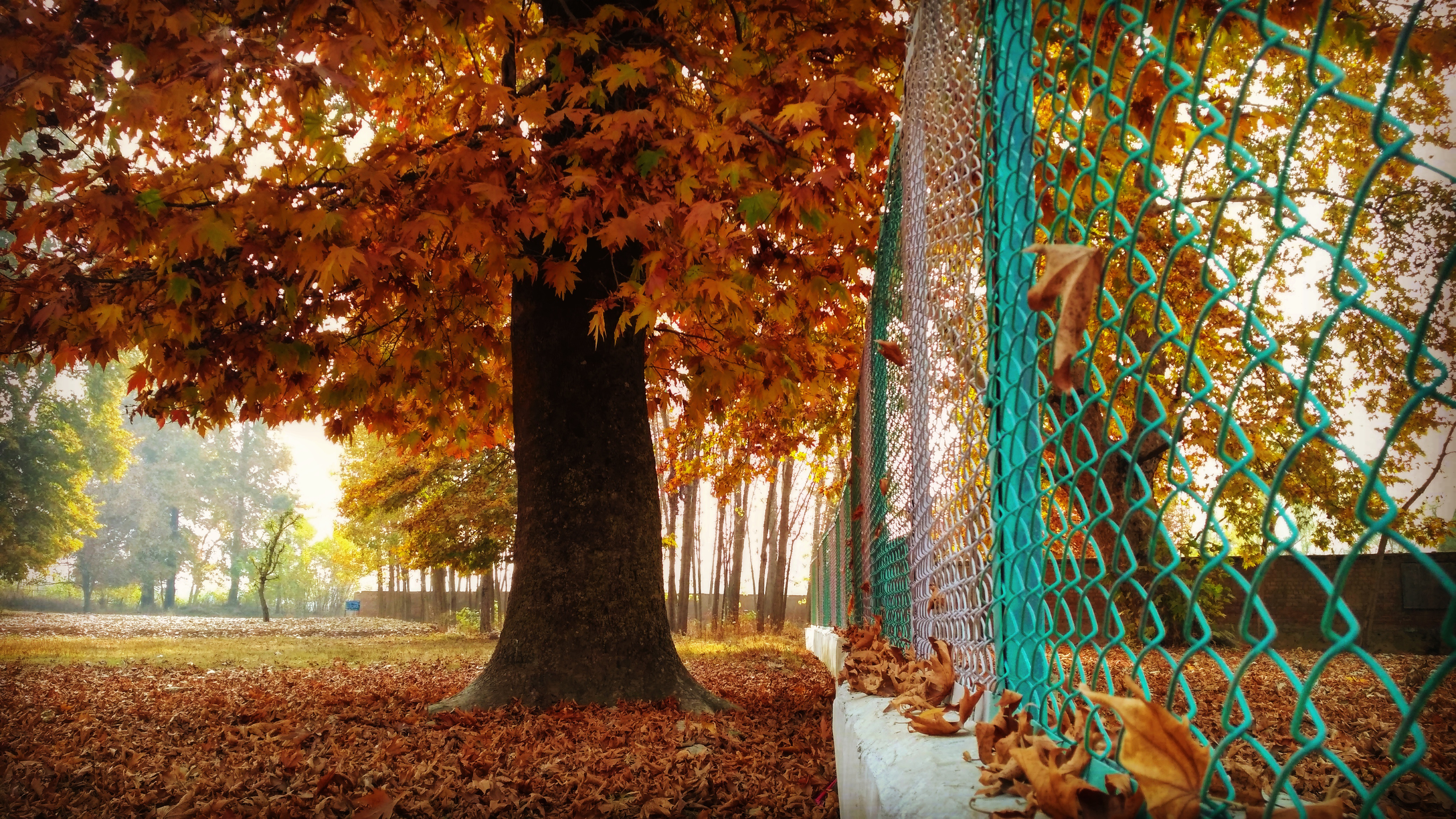
Eidgah at Hathlangoo Sopore

Hathlangoo consists of more than twelve mohallas: Getaway of the village is Nishat Colony & One Of The biggest Mohalla of the village is Dangar Mohalla.

== Amenities ==
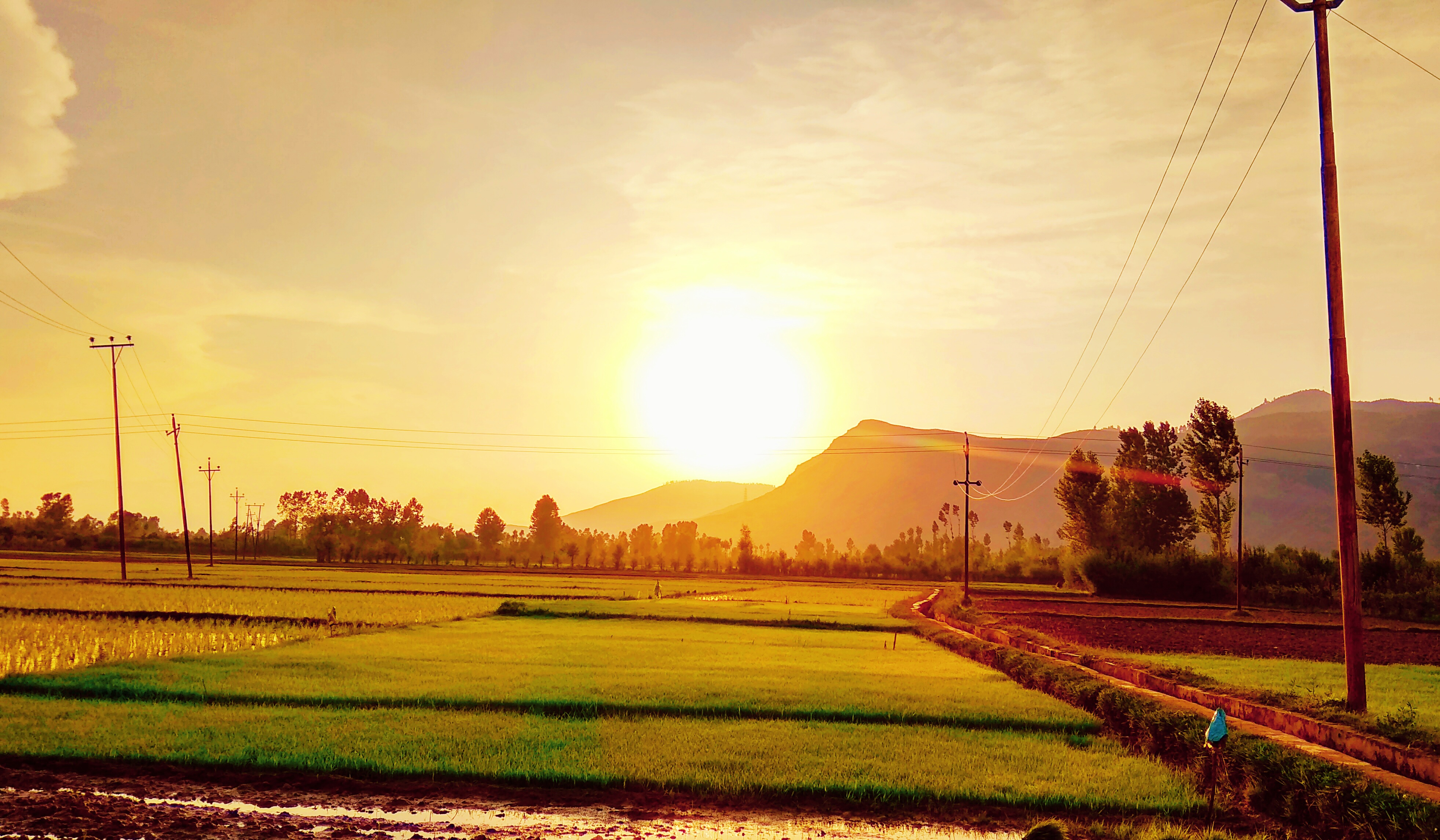
Sunset at Hathlangoo Sopore

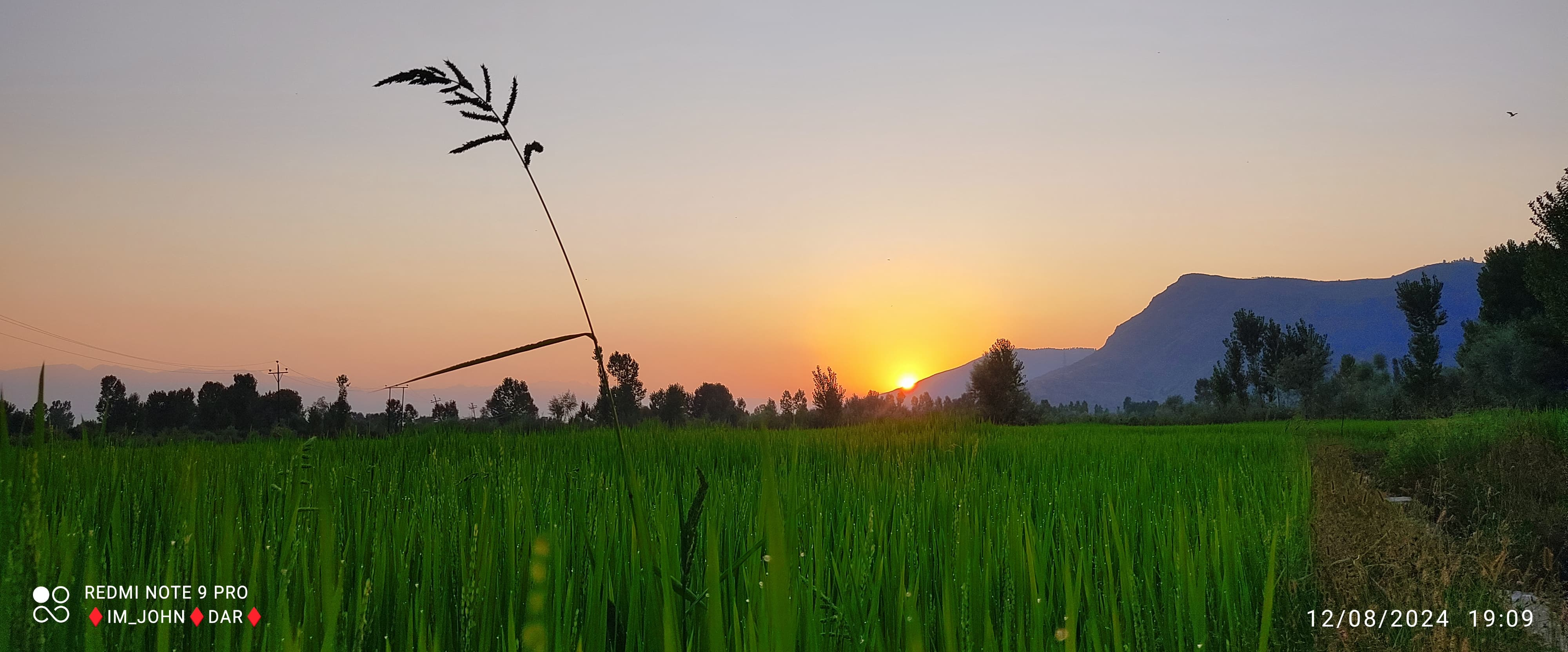
Sunset in Hathlangoo In Summer Season @2024

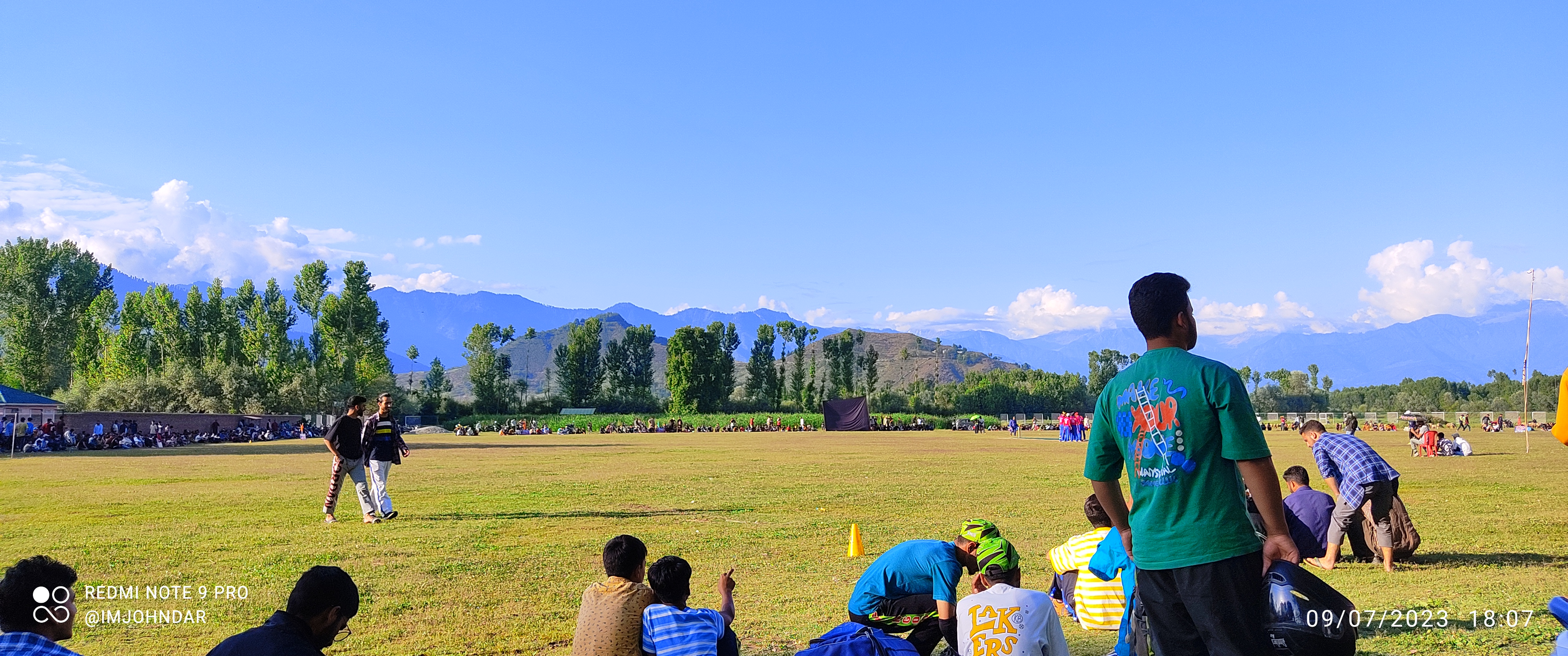
Glimpse of HPL Season 14 Year 2023

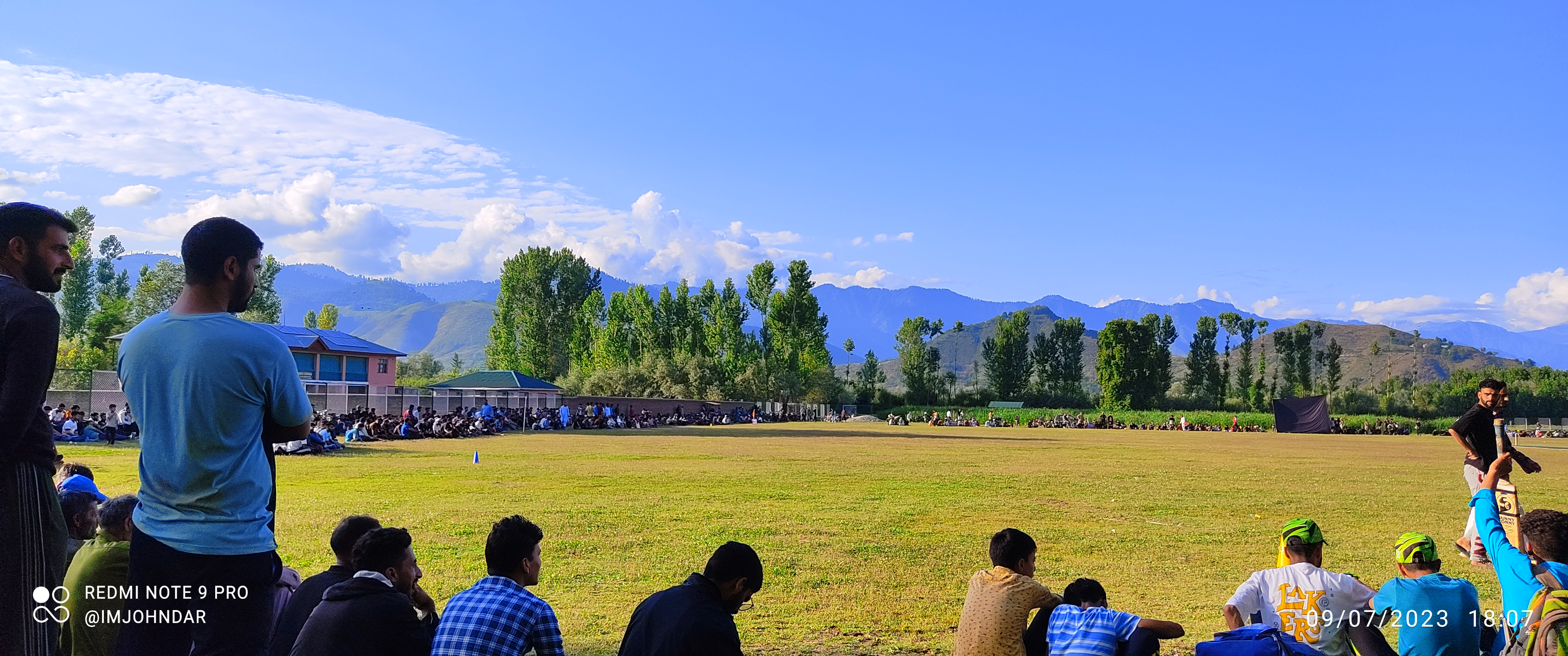
Glimpse of HPL Season 14 Year 2023

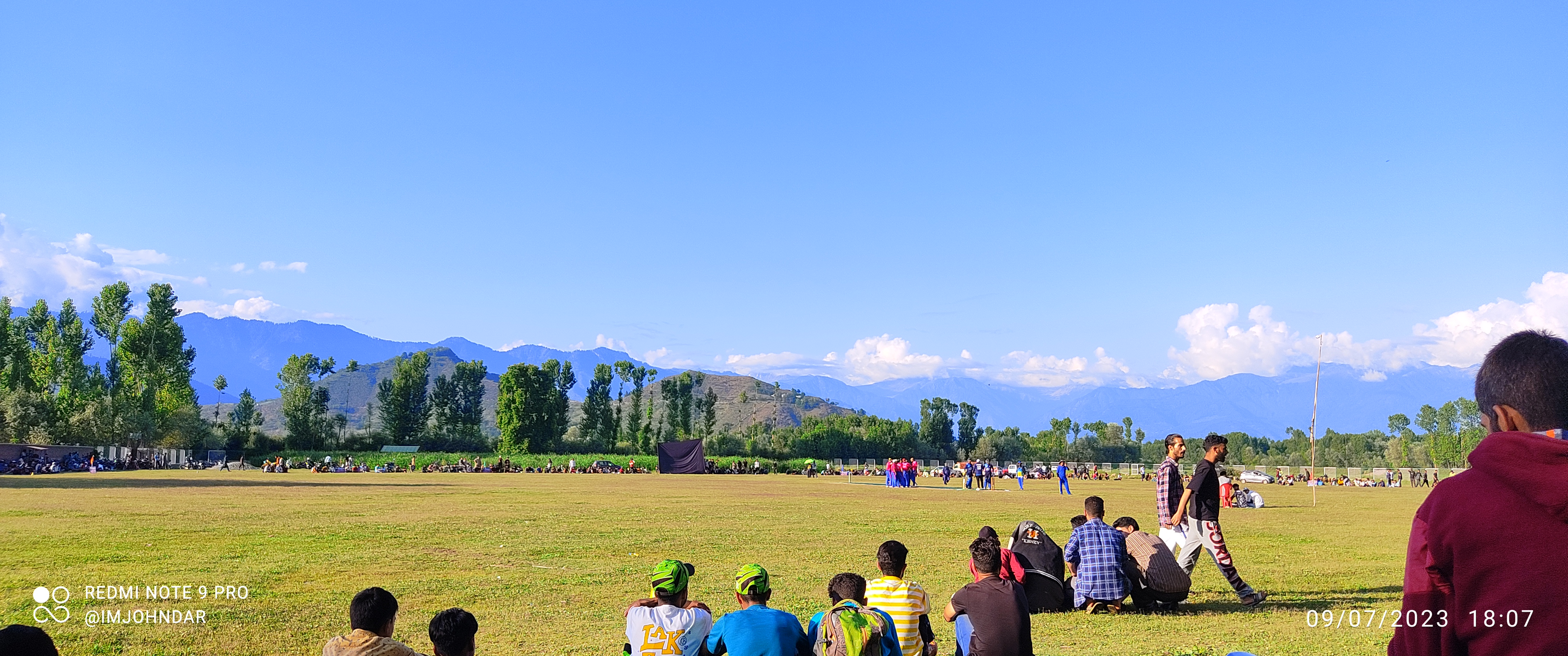
Glimpse of HPL Season 14 Year 2023

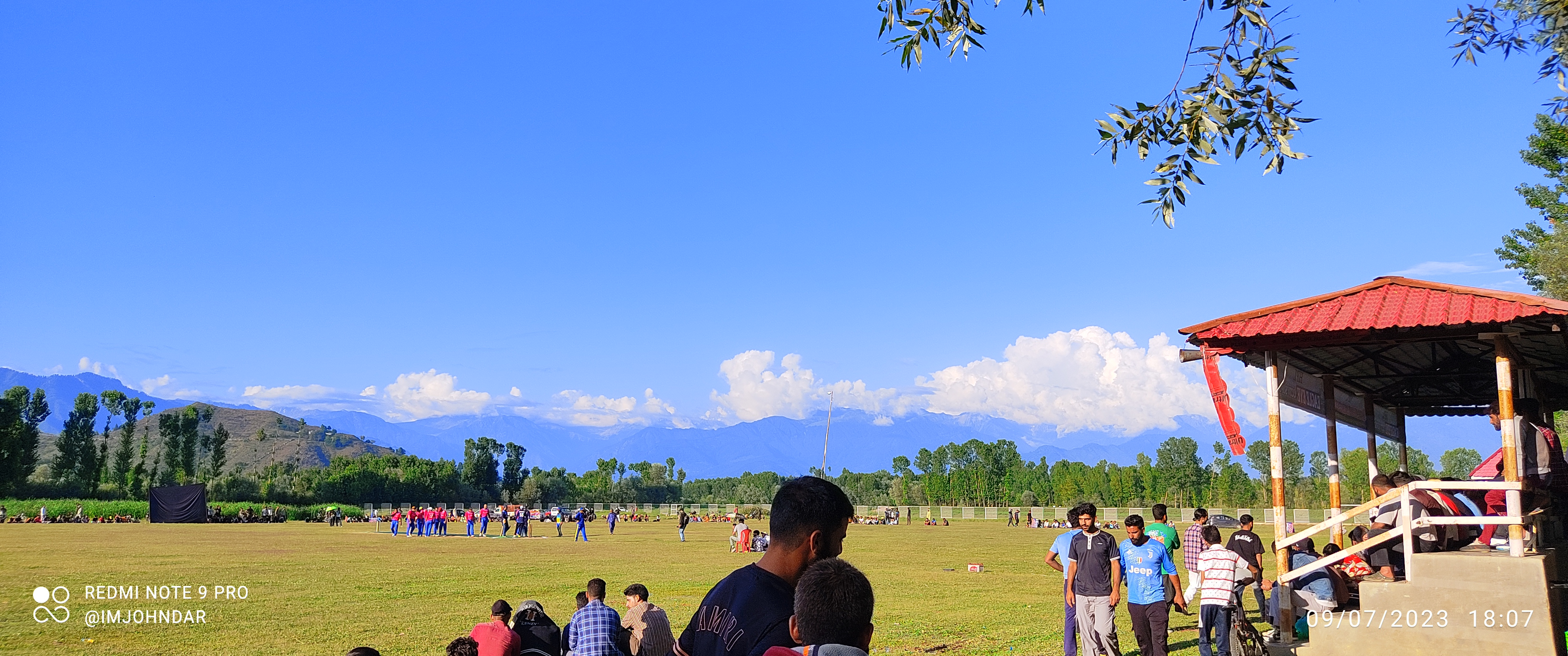
Glimpse of HPL Season 14 Year 2023

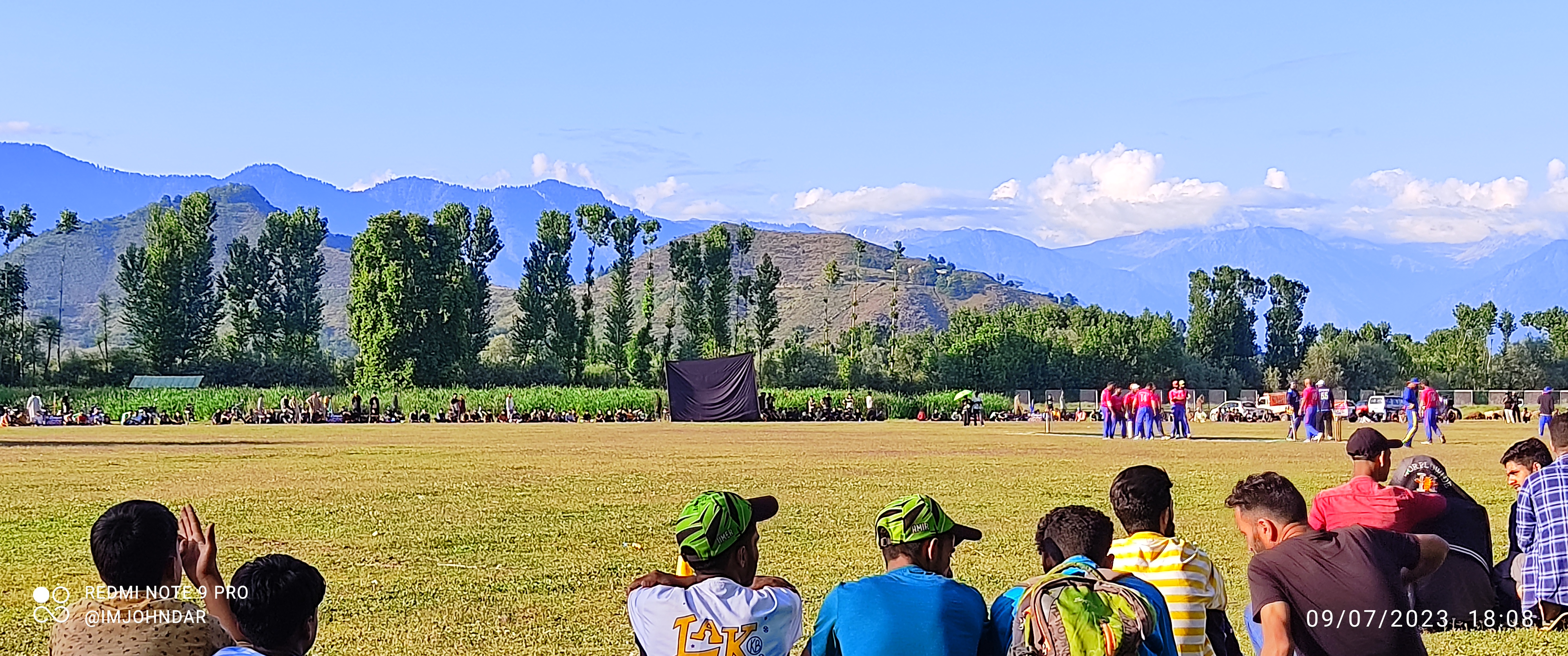
Glimpse of HPL Season 14 Year 2023

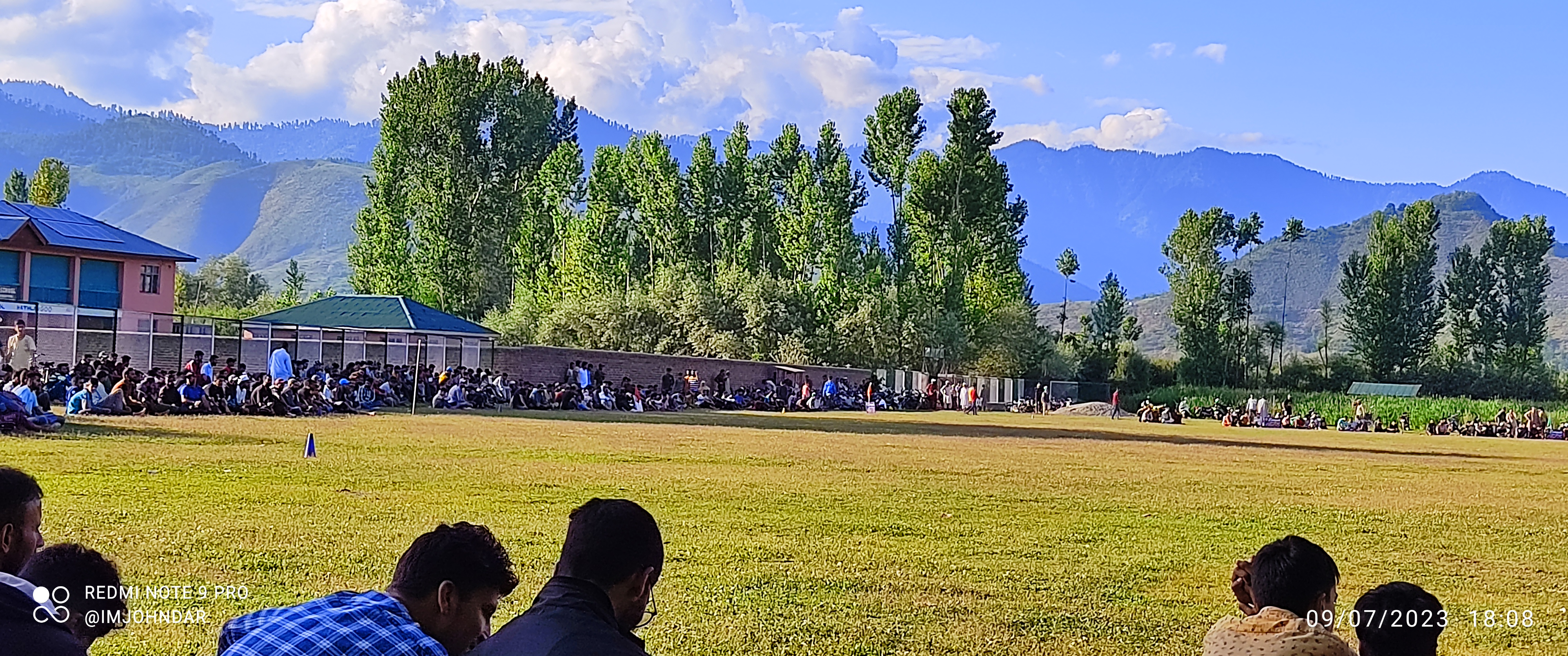
Glimpse of HPL Season 14 Year 2023

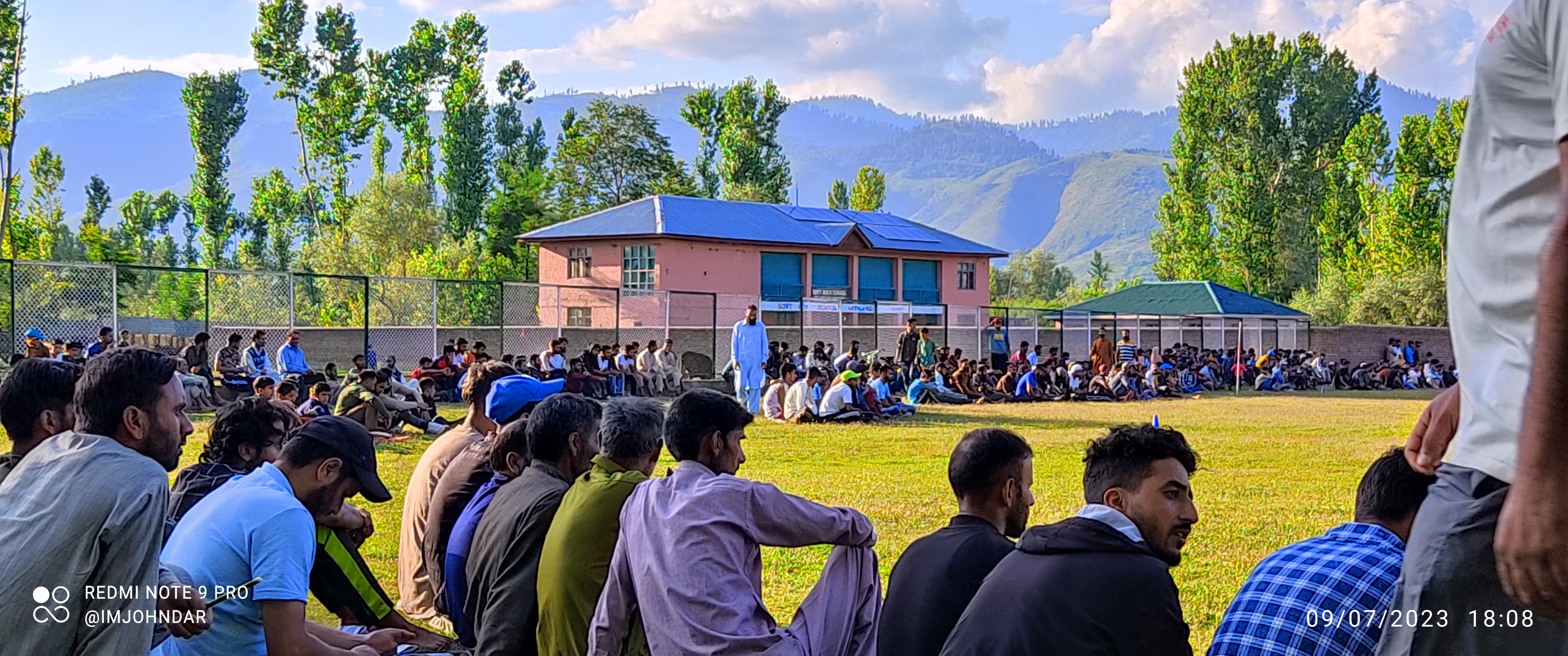
Glimpse of HPL Season 14 Year 2023

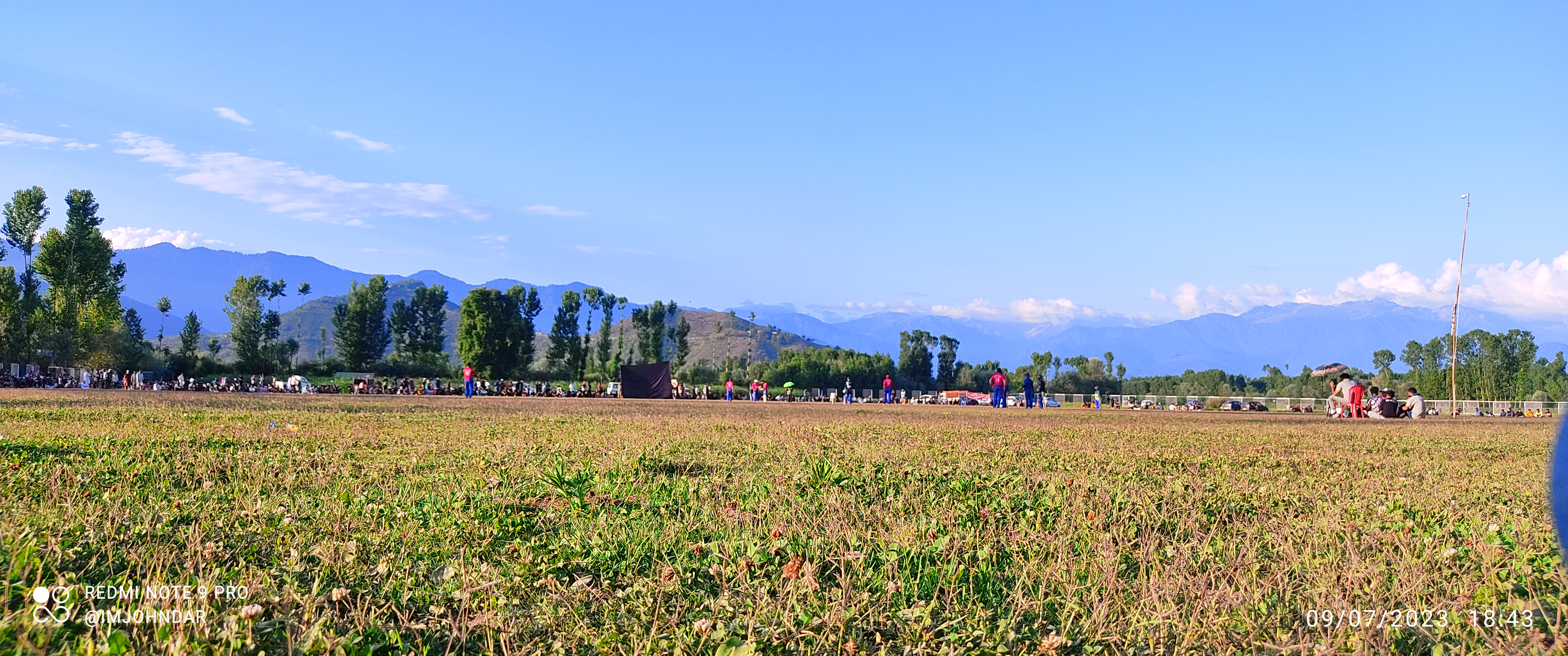
Glimpse of HPL Season 14 Year 2023

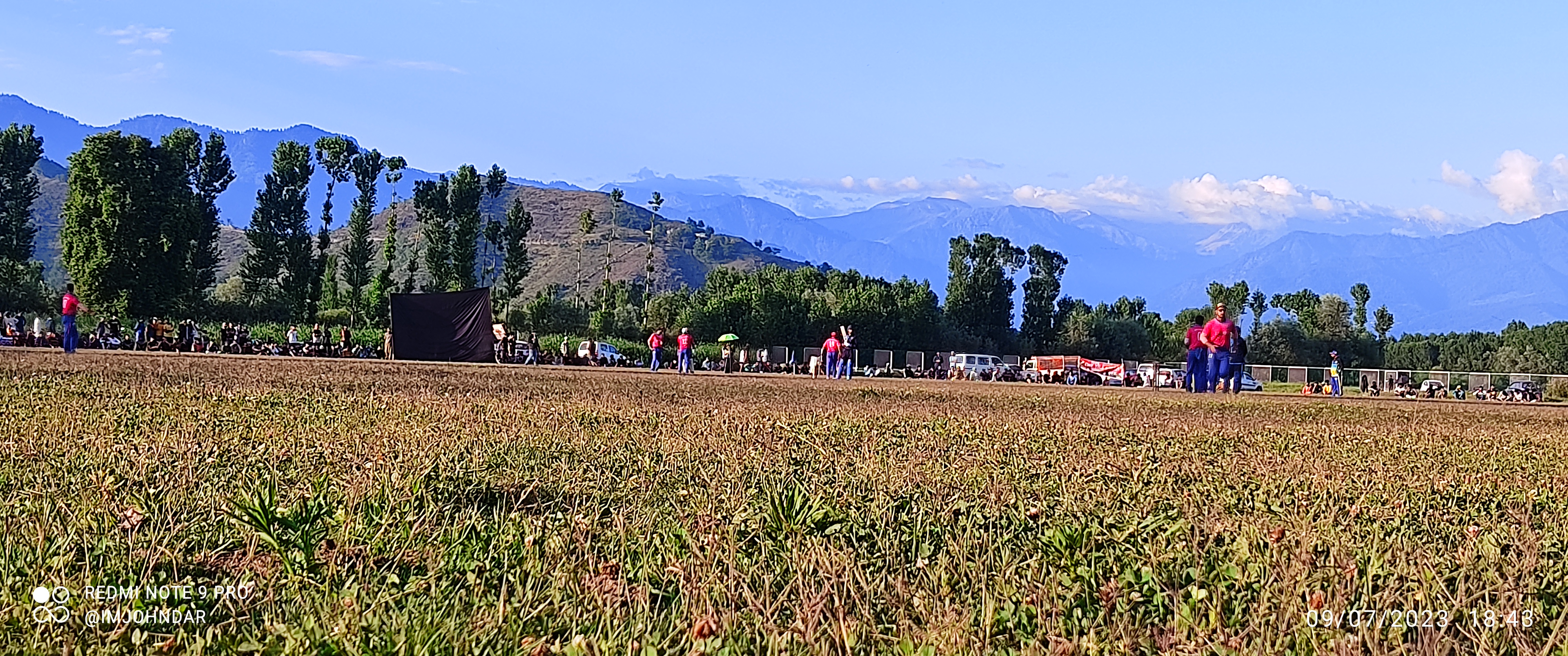
Glimpse of HPL Season 14 Year 2023

The village has a vast land for playing. It has the biggest stadium in the Sopore block. Cricket and football are popular sports. Hathlangoo has produced some talented cricket players that have played at inter-college level. The Hathlangoo sports ground holds various regional sporting events. The Hathlangoo Premier League is a non professional cricket tournament held in Hatlangoo every year.

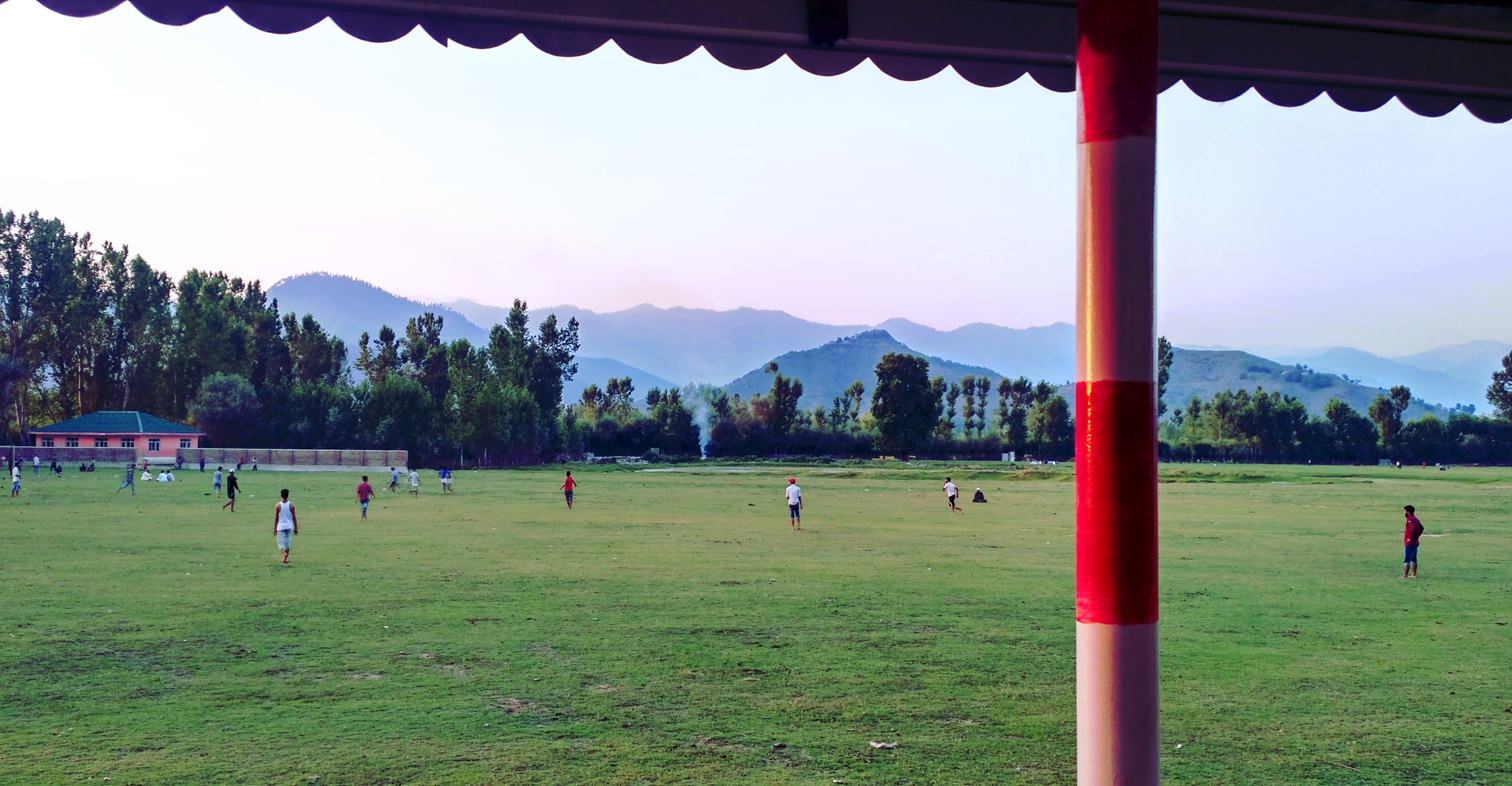
Habba Sahib Stadium at Hathlangoo

== Healthcare Facilities ==
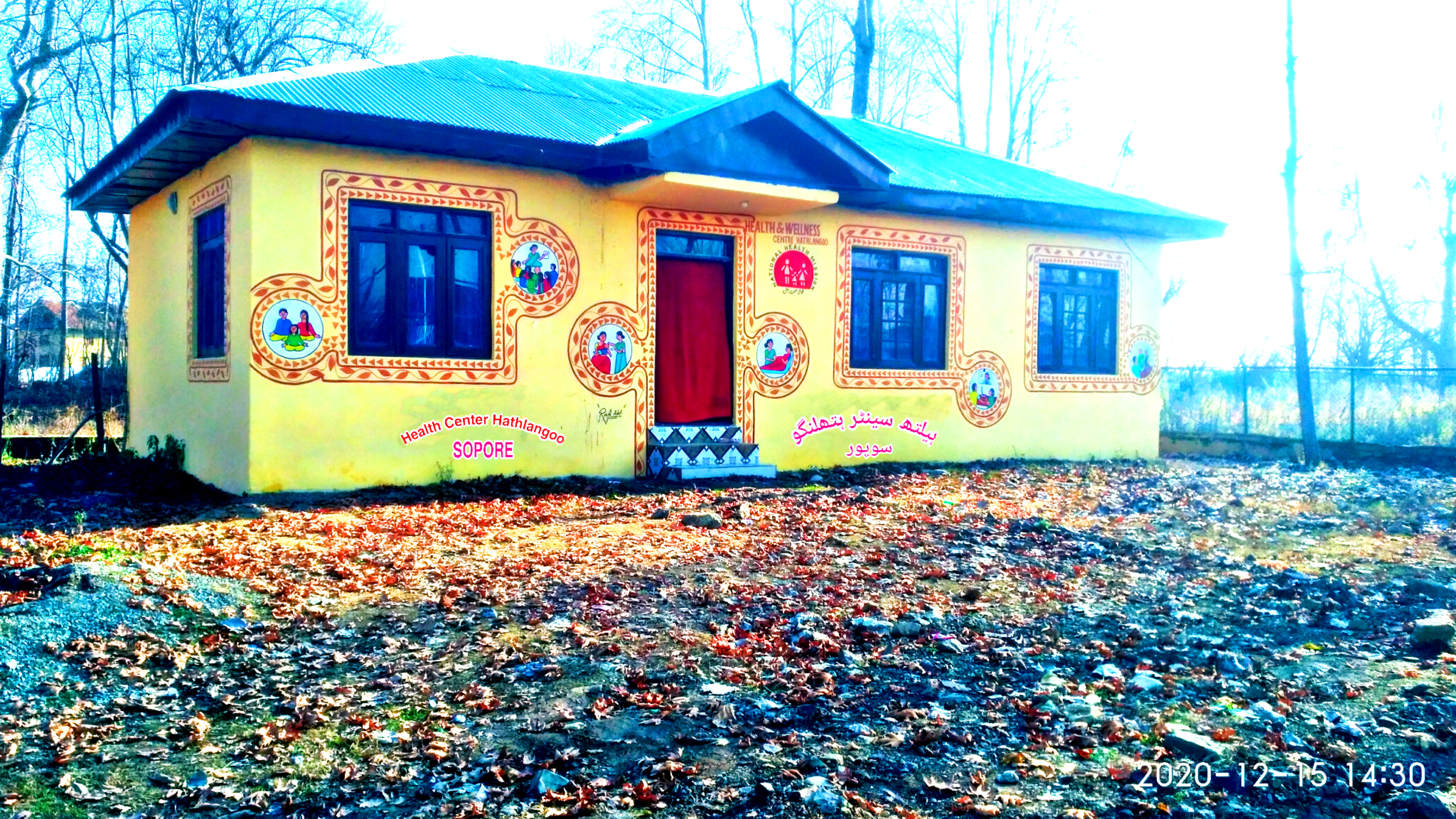
Front View of Health Centre Hathlangoo

The village has one government-run Allopathic Medical Dispensary with almost all the basic Medical Needs. There are four clinics in this Village, three at Dangar Mohalla and the fourth in Khuspora.

== Transportation ==
Air

The nearest airport is Sheikh ul-Alam International Airport in Srinagar which is located around 70 kilometres from Hathlangoo.

Rail

The nearest railway station is SOPORE RAILWAY STATION which is located 15 kilometres from Hathlangoo.

Road

Hathlangoo is well-connected to other places in Jammu and Kashmir and India by the SOPORE-BANDIPORA Road and other roads around the village. From Hathlangoo to Sopore, EECO Vehicle Service is always available from Morning Time till late Dusk Time at EECO STAND HATHLANGOO near Cerntal Cemetry.

== See also ==
- Sopore
- Zaingair
- Gulmarg
- Baramulla
- Srinagar
