= Ahmadullah Affandi =

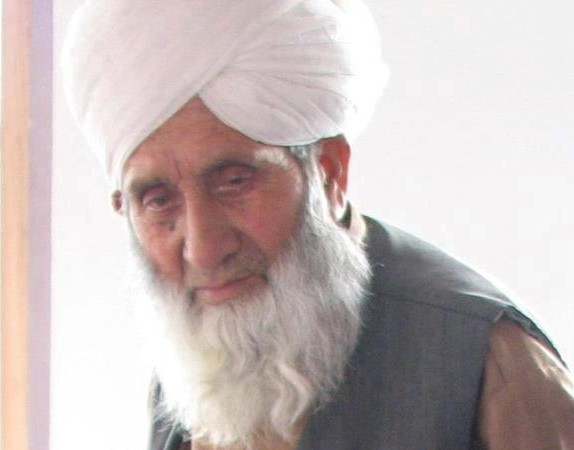
Ahmadullah Affandi

Ahmadullah Affandi (22 February 1922 – 18 February 2013), also known as ‘Baba-e-J&K Scouting’, is an Indian national award-winning scout from Jammu and Kashmir. Affandi was born and raised in Onagam village of Bandipora district in north Kashmir. In 1999, he received the Bharat Scouts and Guides Silver Elephant National Award in recognition of his services to the youth. Affandi was given a state award in 2005–06.

Affandi was appointed as a government teacher in 1937–38. He raised the scouts troops at the local public school in Bandipora, where he worked until 1980. He was the leader of Indian contingent, which was invited to Saudi Arabia by the then Saudi Arabian King, Shah Faesal in 1967.

Affandi played as a goalkeeper for Kashmir 11 Hockey team, which participated in different matches at Lahore in 1939–40.

== Life and achievements ==
Late Shah Peerzada Ahmadullah popular by the name "Affandi Sahab" ---- Ahmadullah Afandi was born on 22 February 1922 and got his Government job as a teacher when he was just a student of class 10th, in the year 1937. His sports skills came into the eyes of an English lady at an event at M.P. School, Amira Kadal who thought Affandi was a physical instructor but after knowing that he was a student with such skills that the best teachers had, wished him to be a teacher. Her words, "I have seen such a great function in Gilwell park London (a camp site and activity centre for scouting and guiding groups)" and due to Kadal's directions, Affandi was appointed as a teacher and posted at Iskardu Gilgit (now in Pakistan).

Affandi played for the Kashmir hockey team as a goal keeper against Lahore. He emerged as a first class scout from Kashmir and attended many camps and jamborees in the United Hindustan. It was during these camps his skills came into the limelight. He was honoured by the then President of independent India, Zakir Hussain, who was so impressed by his character that he eagerly wanted to make him a cup of tea as a token of love. His words for him being, Iss Mehmaan-e-Rasool (SAW) ko main apne haathoon se bani chaai pilaaoonga and so he did. He was selected as the leader of the Indian Contingent of Hajj Delegates and during this journey by ship his philanthropic nature worked wonders for the Haajis. An elderly lady who had severe diarrhoea almost collapsed due to dehydration; her son got sick too, and Mr. Affandi took care of her. He washed her soiled clothes and nursed her. Once she recovered she wished to see this gentleman, called him and gave him many blessings and Mr. Affandi witnessed those blessings getting true at every step of his life.

In Saudi Arabia, he was honoured by the then King of Saudi Arabia Late Mr. Shah Faesal in 1967. King Faesal presented him with many gifts - A Sony transistor, scouting badges, scarves and a Parker pen with a diamond stud on its cap. He was honoured by state awards so many times and even got an extension in his service twice after retirement. Even Ladakh region had demanded him to serve there as a scout master permanently but due to familial reasons he had to stay back and couldn't accept the offer. Despite this, he continued to train teachers (male and female), students and everyone around in all the three regions of the state. He was given the name "Baba-e-Scouting".

After retirement, he taught at Eaglets Public, a private school in Bandipora, continuing into his 80s. He taught classes of almost 100 to 120 students, instructing them in basic learning. He traveled to the school by bicycle and rarely took casual leave. He held the belief that "work is worship." He swam across Dal Lake and Manasbal Lake in his youth. He performed his own chores and gathered feed for the cow he kept at home.

In the year 1999, Affandi was further honoured by the then President of India Mr. K.R. Narayannan with the Silver Elephant award in recognition of his services to the Bharat Scouts and Guides movement. Once at Kashmir University's Convocation Hall, Late Mr. S.K. Sinha, the then Governor of J&K during a scouts/guides award ceremony was stunned on seeing the support of the audience who cheered (Scouting 3 claps) for Mr. Affandi for almost 10 minutes continuously. Mr Sinha appreciated him for his lifetime achievement and presented him a memento. The event was telecast live on a private local TV channel.

Affandi died on 18 February 2013 of Alzheimer's disease at the age of 91. He was buried at his native graveyard at Wanagam Bandipora. He had lived well until his last days in spite of his condition.
