= Zaloora =

Village in Jammu and Kashmir, India

Zaloora or Zaalor is a village located in the northern Baramulla district of Jammu and Kashmir (J&K), India. It lies approximately 16 km from Sopore, 10 km from Handwara, and 30 km from Kupwara. Zaloora is situated in a valley within a valley, surrounded by mountains on three sides and bordered by the Lal Kul canal on the fourth side. The village is home to over 6,530 chollas (stoves), indicating its size and the number of households. Zaloora is the third largest village in the Zaingair region, following Dangerpora and Shiva. It shares its boundaries with Harwan to the east, Tujjar Sharief to the southeast, and Unisoo to the west and south.

== Demographics ==
It has 10 Mohallas One of which is situated in the Gujjar Pati region of Zaloora and is called Dera Ismaeel Khan Named after Muhammad Ismaeel Kaak, The Mohallas have approximately 12,000 inhabitants. The village had a sizable population of Hindus, but most left because of the militant uprising of the early 1990s. The name may be derived from "zaal" ("spider web"). The shape of the village resembles a cage which is surrounded by forests from three sides and the other side is open occupied by agricultural fields which is like a swamp, not drying up.

== Facilities ==
Zaloora market consists of almost 120 shops selling daily consumables including groceries, vegetables and fruits, medicine, timber, and iron.

== History ==
Zaloora's long history allegedly began when the lake that covered Kashmir drained, and settlers moved in. Archeological findings near the hem of the mountains that ring the village seem to confirm that Zaloora was home to fisherman.

During the peak of the Buddhist era in Kashmir, Zaloora is said to have been home to a Bodvihar, sanctifying it as a place of religion and learning. During Badshah's reign, holy man Haji Lolo Reshi Baba Sahib, along with disciples, settled in Zaloora. It is said that He went on Haj (pilgrimage) 12 times.

During the reign of Budshah (king of Kashmir during the 14th century), Zaloora got its importance. He turned the direction of the river Pohru through Zaloora in order to serve water scarcity in Zaingair.

== Education ==
Zaloora is one of the most literate villages in Baramulla District. Several mohallas conducted programmes to boost literacy rates and were key to that achievement.

The village has one higher secondary(Govt Higher Secondary School Zaloora), two high schools, one government-run, the other privately owned i.e. Islamia Model school Zaloora(the 4th oldest FAT school in kashmir) etc., four middle schools, five primary schools and was the first higher-educational village in Baramulla.

== Wildlife ==
Zaloora is home to a diverse range of Fish, Birds and wild animals the most notable are the Snow leopard and Himalayan black bear the Bears are known to go into peoples farms, and can commonly be seen in caves on the western side of Zaloora's mountains

== Sports ==
Cricket is the main supporting activity besides volleyball, football, kho kho, kabadi, gilli danda. One more special game played by the children of Zalooora is Brazz. Batbagh is the famous playground (200 kanals).

== Professions ==
The village is home to a range of professionals such as IT workers, engineers, lecturers, and professors. The fruit business and walnut business are also important in Zaloora.
