= Panjigram =

Panjigram is a historical village in Swat District, Pakistan. The people of Panjigram are relatives with each other they are very beautiful people. The Barat Khel subtribe resides in the Panjigram, Odigram, Godgara and Tindodag areas Of Tehsil Babozai of Swat.The Sub Tribes Moolan, Miangaan, Mirkhan Khail, Nasar Khail, Moola Khail And Peeran Zara Khail of Barat Khail Sub Tribe Of Yousafzai Tribe Resides In Panjigram. Family Tree Of Barat Khail Yousafzai -> Akozai -> Bayezai -> Babuzai -> Barat Khail.. The Prominent Khans In Panjigram Were Manjawar Khan Mirkhan Khail And Dost Muhammad Khan Nasar Khail. The notable people of Panjigram include Imran Khan Junior who has played in the International Cricket team of Pakistan.panjigram is near to river swat . Panjigram is in National Assembly constituency NA-29, Swat-1.
