= Watlab =

Village in Kashmir, India

Watlab Genuine Kashmir
- Town
- Nickname: Apple Village
- Location in Jammu and Kashmir, India Watlab (India)
- Coordinates: 34.30°N 74.47°E
- Country: India
- Union territory: Jammu and Kashmir
- District: Baramulla
- Founded: 880CE
- Incorporated as Town: 1883
- Founder: Utpala dynasty
- Named for: Suyya (Sun)

Government
  - Type: Democratic (Sarpanch)
  - Body: The Sopore Municipal Council

Watlab is a village located in the Baramulla district of Jammu and Kashmir, India. Situated in the Kashmir Valley. Watlab is situated on the Sopore-Bandipore road, about 56 km from Srinagar and 8 km from Sopore in Jammu and Kashmir .

== History ==
Ancient and Medieval Periods:

The Kashmir Valley, including the region around Watlab, has a rich history that dates back to ancient times. The valley was a part of the great Mauryan Empire., ruled by Emperor Ashoka in the 3rd century BCE. It subsequently came under the control of various dynasties, including the Kushans, Guptas, and the early medieval period saw the advent of Islamic rule with the arrival of Muslim rulers from Central Asia.

Mughal Era

During the 16th and 17th centuries, the Mughal Empire, under Emperor Akbar and his successors, extended its control over the Kashmir region. The Mughals had a significant impact on the art, architecture, and culture of the region. It is likely that Watlab and its surrounding areas were part of the Mughal administration during this time.

Sikh and Dogra Rule

In the early 19th century, the Sikh Empire, under Maharaja Ranjit Singh, annexed Kashmir and brought the region under Sikh rule. However, the Sikhs lost control of Kashmir in 1846 after the signing of the Treaty of Amritsar, which transferred the region to the Dogra dynasty. The Dogra rulers, who were Hindu, continued to govern Kashmir until the partition of India in 1947.

Post-Independence and Conflict

Following India's independence from British colonial rule in 1947, the princely states were given the option to join either India or Pakistan. The then ruler of Kashmir, Maharaja Hari Singh, initially chose to remain independent. However, due to a series of events, including an invasion by Pakistani tribesmen, the ruler acceded to India, leading to the Indo-Pakistani conflict over Kashmir.

The region of Watlab, like many other parts of Kashmir, has been affected by the ongoing conflict between India and Pakistan over the territorial dispute. The area has witnessed occasional unrest and has been subject to security concerns.

== Geography ==
Watlab is on the Jhelum River, at its highest point. Watlab town is stretched from Kehnoosa Village in North and Hardusho village in South .There are few Bridges on Jhelum in Watlab and good connectivity roads.Watlab is located at 34.40° N 74.41° E . It has an average elevation of 1,600 meters (5,250 feet) above sea level.

== Climate ==
Watlab has a humid subtropical climate, with cold, snowy winters and hot summers.

Climate data for Watlab (1971–1986)
Month	Jan	Feb	Mar	Apr	May	Jun	Jul	Aug	Sep	Oct	Nov	Dec	Year
Mean daily maximum °C (°F)	7.0 (44.6)	8.2 (46.8)	14.1 (57.4)	20.5 (68.9)	24.5 (76.1)	29.6 (85.3)	30.1 (86.2)	29.6 (85.3)	27.4 (81.3)	22.4 (72.3)	15.1 (59.2)	8.2 (46.8)	19.7 (67.5)
Mean daily minimum °C (°F)	−2 (28)	−0.7 (30.7)	3.4 (38.1)	7.9 (46.2)	10.8 (51.4)	14.9 (58.8)	18.1 (64.6)	17.5 (63.5)	12.1 (53.8)	5.8 (42.4)	0.9 (33.6)	−1.5 (29.3)	7.3 (45.1)
Average precipitation mm (inches)	48 (1.9)	68 (2.7)	121 (4.8)	85 (3.3)	68 (2.7)	39 (1.5)	62 (2.4)	76 (3.0)	28 (1.1)	33 (1.3)	28 (1.1)	54 (2.1)	710 (27.9)
Average precipitation days (≥ 1.0 mm)	6.6	7.3	10.2	8.8	8.1	5.7	7.9	6.8	3.5	2.8	2.8	5.1	75.6
Source: HKO
