= Zaingair =

Village in Jammu and Kashmir, India

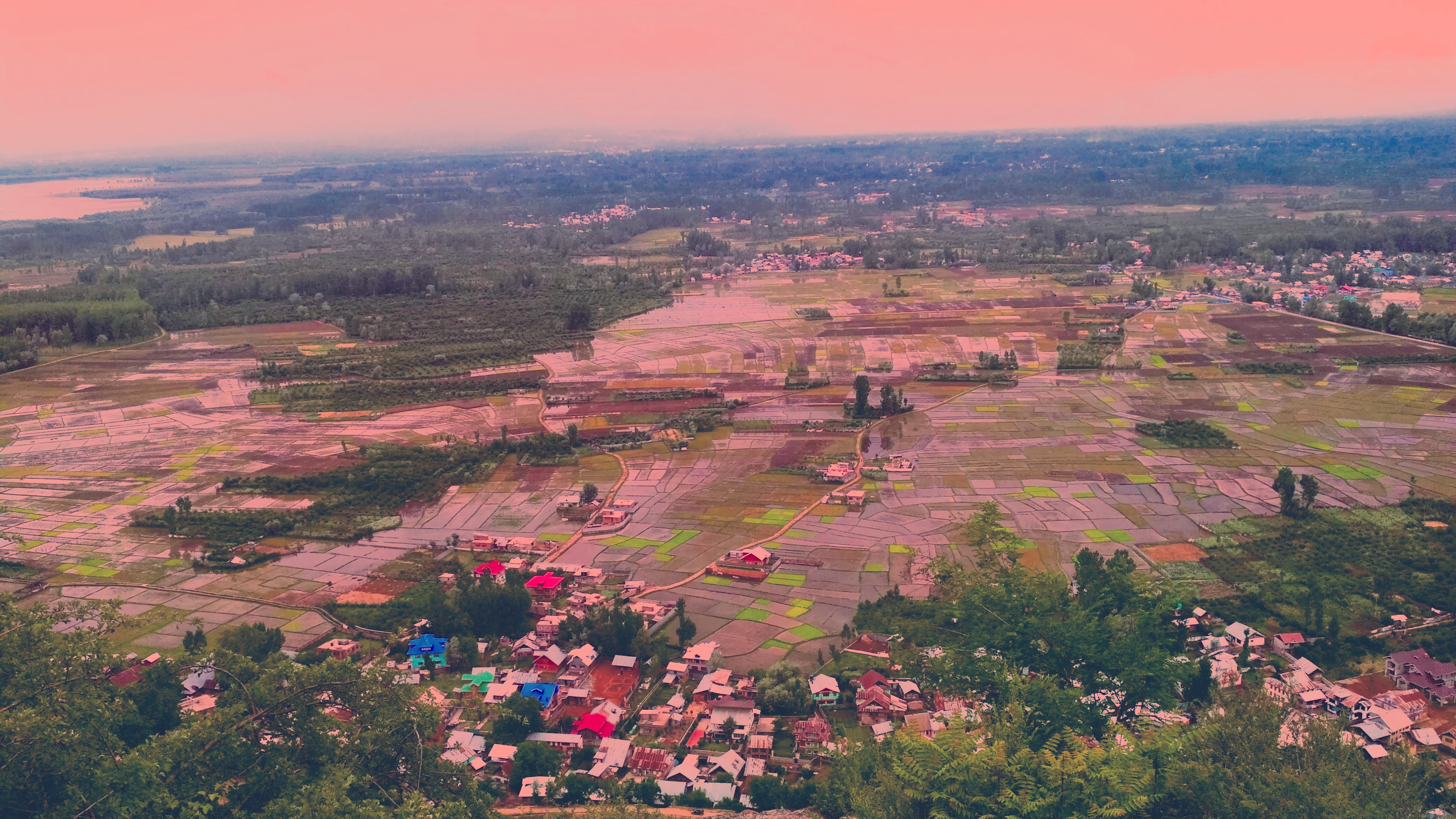
View of Zaingair from Baba Shukur din Mountain

Zaingair or Zeangair is a group of villages in the Sopore constituency of Baramulla district, Jammu and Kashmir. It is the largest area in Sopore. It comprises about 38 villages spread over three tehsils of Sopore.

The main villages comprising Zaingair are Hathlangoo Warpora,Janwara, Malmapanpora, Malpora, Boyingoo, Watlab, Tujar, Bomai, Logripora, Goripora, Saidpora, Dooru, Dangarpora, Brath, sempora Wadoora, Seelo, and Zaloora.

Apple business is the main source of livelihood of the people in Zangair. There are numerous educational institutions located in Zangair. Agriculture University is also located in Wadoora Sopore.

Zangair belt of Sopore has long been a separatist stronghold. Recently, Govt cut Sopore constituency by half by bifurcating the Zangair belt and merging more than half of it with Rafiabad Constituency leading to dissent and anguish among local populace, as merging vital belt of Sopore with nearby Rafiabad sans all logic and depicts unravelling and disintegrating of Constituencies mere for political benefits.

== See also ==
- Gulmarg
