= Hakim Sanaullah Cancer Centre =

- Hakim Sanaullah Specialist Hospital

Geography
- Location: Sopore, Jammu and Kashmir, India
- Coordinates: 34.282433°N 74.430798°E

Links
- Lists: Hospitals in India

The Hakim Sanaullah Cancer Centre is a Cancer Centre at Sopore, in the Indian union territory of Jammu and Kashmir.

HSCC is a rural cancer centre in the heart of North Kashmir. The Centre is part of the Hakim Sanaullah Specialist Hospital and providing quality cancer care to the neglected rural population in the region. Currently the centre provides Medical Oncology, Surgical Oncology and Diagnostic/Imaging services. The centre remains part of a global effort towards managing cancer in a limited resource setting. Over two-thirds of Kashmiris live in rural areas with access to a health care system marred by deficiencies. An overburdened urban health care setup adds to the misery of these rural millions.

Hakim Sanaullah Specialist Hospital & Cancer Centre is an effort to overcome these deficiencies. The institution is a tertiary health care facility with the first rural cancer centre of Jammu and Kashmir catering to a population of over 1 million. By providing quality health care, accessible and affordable to these millions, the institution aims at changing the landscape of health care services in the region in particular, and the state as a whole.

== History ==
On 29 June 2009, Dr Shuaib Zaidi a surgical oncologist, assisted by Dr Yusuf Tak, an anaesthetist, implanted a Chemoport Device, which is an embedded device within the layers of the skin, to act as a port for the administration of chemotherapeutic drugs for cancer. Also, on the next day, a limb-salvage surgery was performed, saving the left lower limb of a patient, who had been deemed incurable, and advised amputation of the part. As of 9 August 2009, the patient is doing fine.

Plans are afoot to bring a CT scan to the hospital, and also to establish a telemedicine link with national and international cancer institutions to further cancer care research in Kashmir.

In October 2013, the first dialysis centre in North Kashmir was started in the premises of the Hakim Sanaullah Cancer Centre. Currently, two dialysis machines, installed by Fresenius Kabi, are functional, and plans are in foot to expand the services soon.
