= Sopore Fruit Market =

The Sopore Fruit Mandi is the largest wholesale fruit market in Kashmir and the second-largest in Asia after Azadpur Mandi in Delhi.

Located in Sopore, a town in the Barumalla district of Jammu and Kashmir, it had an estimated annual turnover of around ₹7000 crore in 2025 (approximately $74.1 million USD as of 2026).

== History ==
In the late 1980s, Kashmir was heavily dependent on Delhi for trading assistance, with the Kashmiri farmers dependent on Delhi merchants for advance payments. In an effort to minimise this dependence, Muhammad Mustafa established the Sopore Fruit Mandi along with some other fruit growers.

== See also ==
- Jammu and Kashmir
- Economy of Kashmir
