= Nathipora =

Nathipora Naethpur Nathipur
- Village
- Nickname: Nathpur
- Location in Jammu and Kashmir, India Nathipora (India)
- Coordinates: 34.3645031°N 74.3915766°E
- Country: India
- Union territory: Jammu and Kashmir
- District: Baramulla
- Block: Tujjar

Languages
  - Official: Kashmiri, Urdu, Hindi, Dogri, English
- Time zone: UTC+5:30 (IST)
- PIN Code: 193201

Nathipora is a village in Sopore tehsil, in the Baramulla District of Jammu and Kashmir, India.

The village had a total population of 1827 in the 2011 census. The literacy rate was 68.12% compared to 67.16% in Jammu and Kashmir as a whole. In Nathi Pora male literacy was 81.65% and female literacy was 55.33%.

Nathipora is on Sopore-Kupwara highway.
