= Sopore Law College =

Law college in Jammu and Kashmir, India

Sopore Law College is a private law school located in Sopore, Baramulla district, in the union territory of Jammu and Kashmir, India. Established in 2004 by Prof. Ghulam Rasool Bacha, the college is affiliated with the University of Kashmir, Srinagar, and approved by the Bar Council of India (BCI).

== History and Location ==
Sopore Law College was founded in 2004 by Prof. Ghulam Rasool Bacha to make legal education accessible to students in North Kashmir.

The college campus is located at:

- Address: By-Pass Seer, Sopore, Baramulla District, Jammu and Kashmir – 193201, India.

== Academics ==
The institution offers undergraduate professional law courses:

- LL.B. (3-Year Program): A graduate-entry professional degree in law.
- B.A. LL.B. (5-Year Integrated Program): An integrated double-degree program combining liberal arts and legal education.

The academic curriculum and examination process are governed by the guidelines of the University of Kashmir in accordance with the Bar Council of India standards.

== Chairperson and Vice-Chairperson ==
- Ms. Maryam Bacha: Chairperson of Sopore Law College
- Ms. Tamkinah Naseem Bacha: Vice-chairperson of Sopore Law College

== Principal and Course Coordinator ==
- Mr. Sheikh Mohammad Ishaq: Principal of Sopore Law College
- Mr. Faheem Rasheed Shah: Course Coordinator of Sopore Law College
1. soporelawcollege.edu.in

Sopore Law College
- Type: Private law school
- Established: 2004
- Affiliations: University of Kashmir
- Location: Sopore, Jammu and Kashmir, India
- Website: https://soporelawcollege.edu.in

https://soporelawcollege.edu.in

4
