= Saifi Sopori =

Kashmiri poet

- Born: Saifuddin; January 19, 1922; Sopore, Jammu and Kashmir princely state, British India
- Died: October 19, 2017 (aged 95); Sopore, Jammu and Kashmir, India
- Education: University of the Punjab
- Occupations: Poet, Educationist
- Writing career
- Pen name: Saifi Sopori
- Language: Kashmiri, Urdu, Persian, Arabic, English
- Years active: 1942–2017
- Genre: Gazal

Saifi Sopori (born Saifuddin Masoodi; 19 January 1922 – 19 October 2017), also known by the honorary title Peer Saifuddin Sopori, was a Kashmiri poet and teacher. He wrote poetry and books on various subjects in Urdu, Persian and initially in Kashmiri language throughout his literary career. He used to write on philosophy, and is sometimes referred to as "educationist" for contributing to the literature of Kashmir and for introducing new techniques to the education system in Jammu and Kashmir. His first Urdu poem was published in 1942 by the Daily Khidmat, while his last publication titled Sehra Sehra was published in Urdu, comprising one hundred and eighty-three poems.

== Life ==
He was born at Hati Shah Mohalla of Sopore, Jammu and Kashmir, British India. He attended school in Sopore, and graduated from the University of the Punjab.

== Early life ==
Saifi was employed by the government of Jammu and Kashmir and served as a teacher in his hometown. He was later promoted to Tehsil Education Officer (TEO) and then District Educational Officer and retained this position until he retired in 1977 from the education department as joint director non-formal education for Kashmir Valley.

== Career ==
Sopori started writing around 1942 when his first book was published. He is also credited for translating the publications of John Keats and William Shakespeare, including Viktor Frankl's Logotherapy in Kashmiri language. He also used to wrote in Arabic besides in native languages. He translated the Quran into English which was later introduced to few schools as school assembly (morning assembly or morning prayer). His last publication titled Sehra Sehra, comprising an account of hymns, encomiums and ghazals covered in one hundred and eighty-three poems was published by Allama Iqbal Library of the Kashmir University in 2012.

== Death ==
Sopori died on 19 October 2017 in Sopore town of Baramullah district, Jammu and Kashmir.
