= Nowpora Kalan Sopore =

Village in Jammu and Kashmir, India

Nowpora
- Village
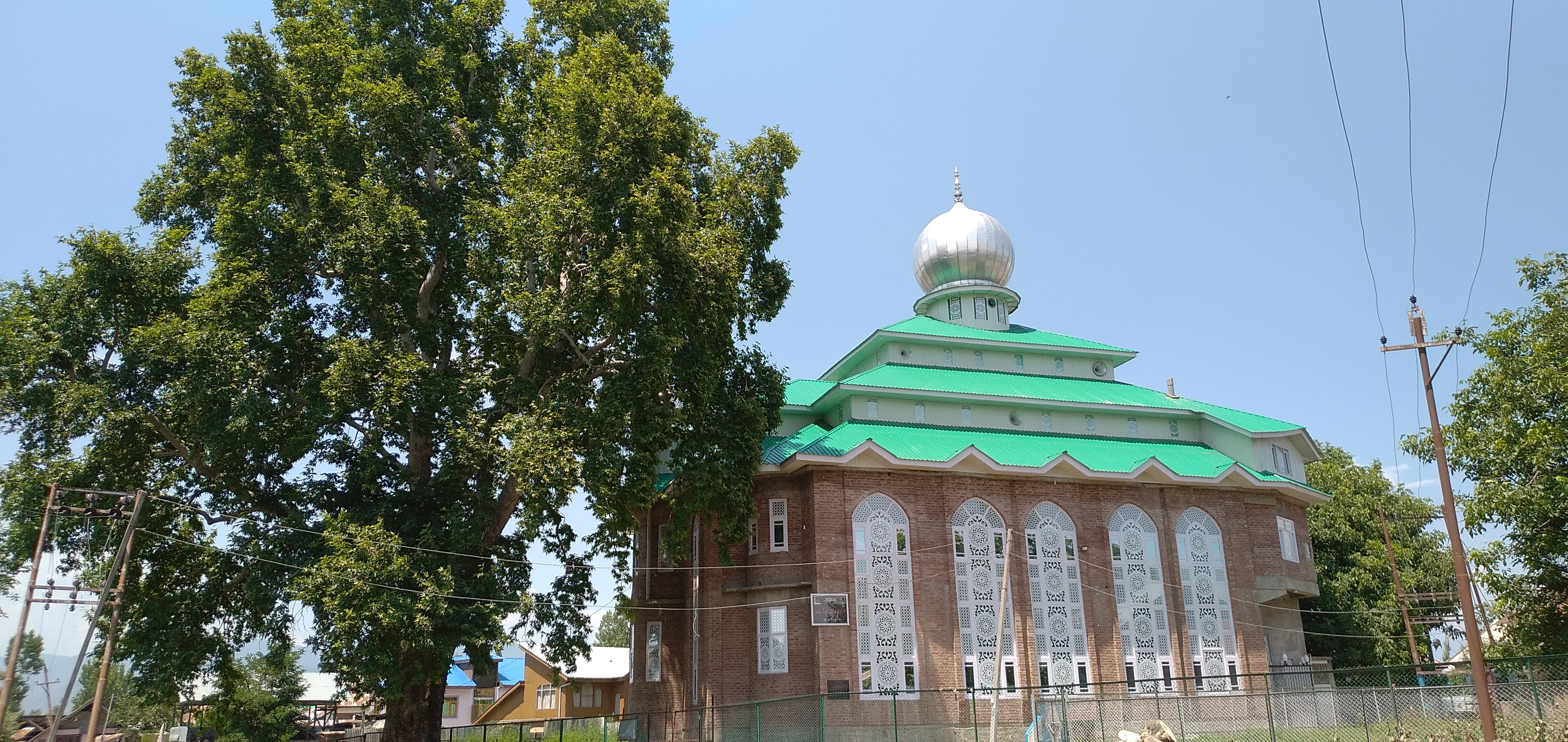
- Jama Masjid

- Location in Jammu and Kashmir Nowpora (India)
- Coordinates: 34.28°N 74.04°E

Nowpora Kalan Sopore is a village situated approximately two kilometres from the main town of Sopore, Jammu and Kashmir. The second-largest fruit market in Asia, is located in this village. The village is a part of Baramulla Lok Sabha constituency and Sopore Assembly constituency, and is divided into two parts Nowpora A and Nowpora B.

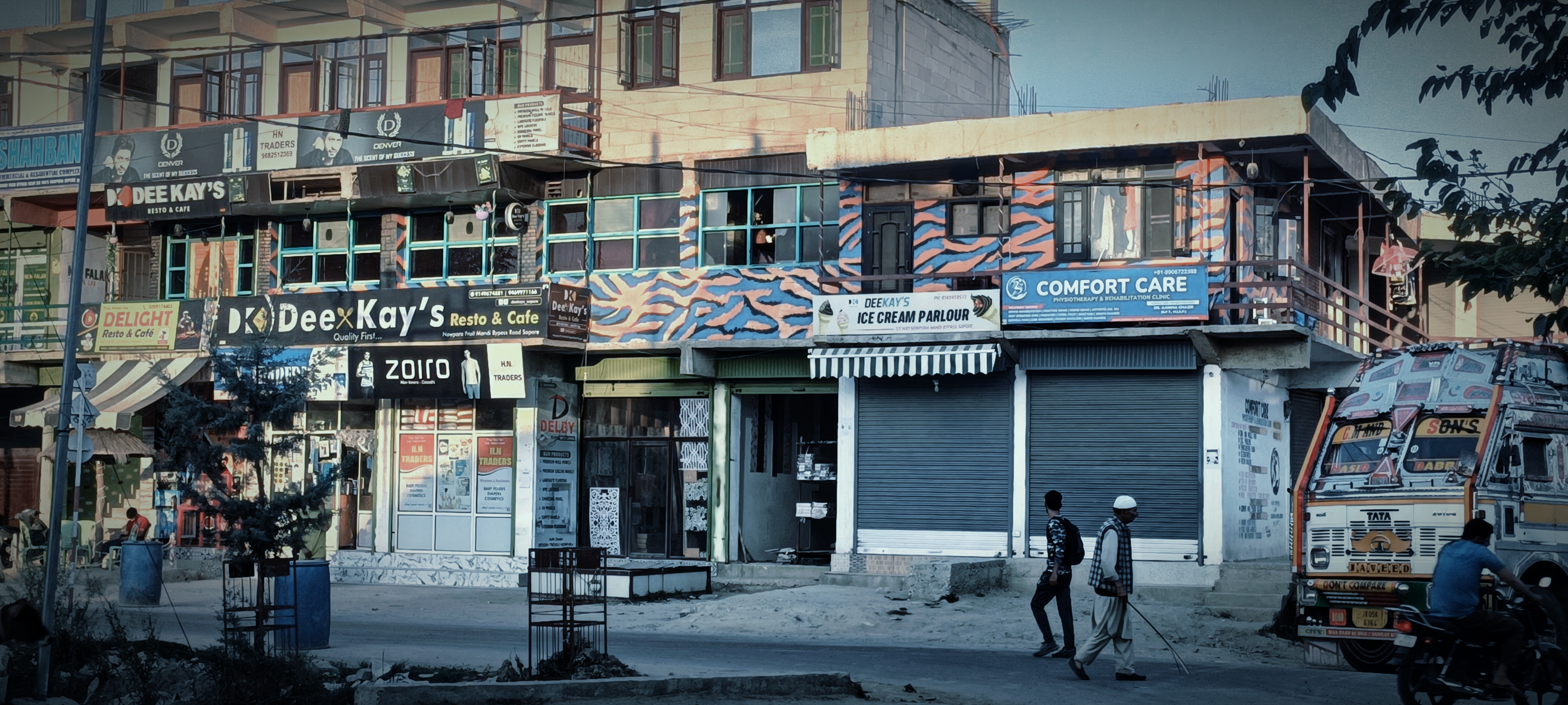
Six way market Nowpora kalan Sopore

== Education ==
Several educational institutions exist in the village. These include Government High School Nowpora, Abu Hanifa Public School, GMET School, and Hanfia Model Public School. Higher institutions like Government Degree College for Women and Gulzar Memorial College of Education are also located in the village premises.

The village is home to over fifteen mosques, including Markazi Jamia Masjid, Masjid Sheikh ul Alam, Masjid Mustafa, Masjid Qadeem, Masjid Ovais, Masjid Ibrahim, and Masjid Mehboob ul Alam. Additionally, the village houses two religious seminaries, Madrasa Islamia Arabia Darul uloom and Darul Uloom Faizan-e-Madina.

== Sports field ==
The village also has a sports field known as Alamdar Sports field which is a property of the National Sports Council.

== Organizations ==
Civil Society Nowpora, is one of the local Non-governmental organizations.
