= Atiqa Bano =

Indian educationist

- Born: 1940; Sopore
- Died: 4 October 2017
- Education: Government College for Women, Banasthali Vidyapith
- Occupation: Teacher

Atiqa Bano (Behan Ji) (1940 – 4 October 2017) was an Indian educationist and activist for the artistic and cultural heritage of Kashmir. She established and curated the Meeras Mahal, a private museum of history and art at Highland Colony, Sopore in Baramulla Kashmir.

== Biography ==
Atiqa Bano was born in 1940 in Sopore in the Kashmir North district of the princely state of Jammu and Kashmir in British India. Her father, Molvi Mohammad Yasin Masoodi, was a freedom fighter. He died when she was a few months old, and she was brought up by her mother.

Bano obtained an undergraduate degree from the Women's College, Srinagar, followed by two master's degrees in economics and in Urdu. She then attended Banasthali Vidyapeeth in Rajasthan for a postgraduate degree in education.

Atiqa Bano died of cancer on 4 October 2017 in Sopore, aged 77.

== Career ==
=== Education ===
Atiqa Bano started her career in 1958 as a teacher. She became a schools inspector seven years later. In 1977 she was made Chief Education Officer. In 1994, she became a joint director of school education for the state of Jammu and Kashmir. She retired as the state director of Libraries and Research in 1999.

=== Welfare ===
In the 1970s, Bano established the Majlis-un-Nisa, an organisation for women's welfare, helping them to achieve financial independence. Part of this was a centre that trained women in sewing skills, which was set up in building she owned that would later also house her museum of Kashmiri heritage. The organisation also instructed Women in Calligraphy and the teaching of the Qur'an.

=== Museum ===
Part of Bano's career as schools inspector entailed travel across the state. Encountering the diversity of material culture in Kashmir, she thought of establishing a Museum. After retirement, she began then to collect historical and cultural artefacts, especially traditional ware and old manuscripts. Initially she housed them in a derelict hostel building that was part of a college of education that her family owned. In 2001, she set up the Meeras Mahal, a heritage museum.

As the collection grew, she shifted it to a building in Highland Colony, Sopore. By now, it consisted of handwritten Qur'ans, Persian, Arabic and Sanskrit manuscripts, historical coins, an entire history of the evolution of the Kashmiri pheran (wedding trousseaus from both the Muslim and the Pandit communities), pottery, and artefacts related to the weaving of Pashmina textile.

In contrast to the Shri Pratap Singh Museum in Srinagar, which concentrated on the royal history and elite art of Kashmir, the Meeras Mahal deals with the material culture of ordinary people. As the museum has received little support from the state, it remains privately maintained.
