= Yashoda Devi =

Indian politician

Yashoda Devi (1927–2004) was the first woman to be elected from a former princely state of India as a member of a legislative assembly. She was elected to the Legislative Assembly of Rajasthan from the Banswara constituency in 1953 as a candidate of the Socialist Party. Her success, in which she obtained 63.75 per cent of the vote, resulted from a by-election which took place due to the poll for the prior MLA being deemed illegal. In total, four women candidates contested the constituency.

Yashoda Devi was born in Nagda in 1927. After her education at Banasthali Vidhyapeeth and Bheel Ashram in Bamania, she became a campaigner for various issues. These included activism supporting women's rights and against alcohol, as well as the anti-Riyasat campaign (opposition to the system of princely states). She was both chairman and general secretary of Akhil Hindu Vanwasi Mahila Panchayat.

She was given the title Adarsh Nari by Bhairon Singh Shekhawat in April 2003 and died on 3 January 2004.

One other woman, called Kamala Beniwal, was elected to the same assembly later during its 1952–1957 term.
