= Rahim Sopori =

Kashmiri sufi

Sufi; Arif bi'Allah; Rahim Sopori
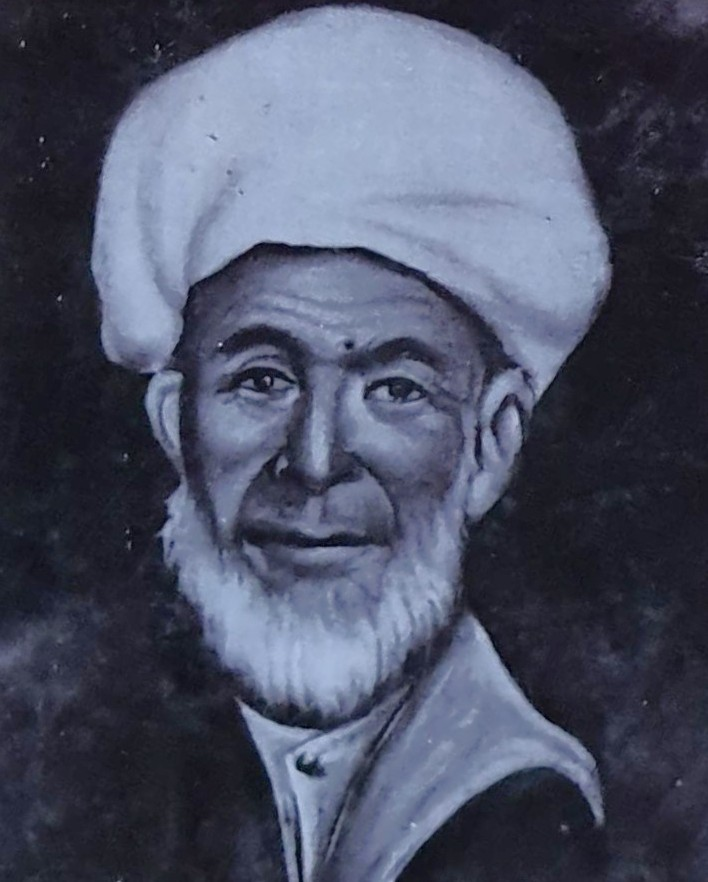
- Rahim Sopori by Mohammad Yousuf Bacha c.2003
- Title: Arif Bi'Allah (Knower of God)

Personal life
- Born: Abdul Rahim Shah; 1775 Sopore
- Died: 1850 (aged 74–75)
- Resting place: Teliyan Mohalla, Sopore
- Buried: Ziyarat Sharif Rahim Sahab Sopori, Teliyan Mohallah Sopore
- Region: Kashmir
- Main interest: Poetry
- Occupation: Weaver

Religious life
- Religion: Islam
- Tariqa: Qadiriyya, Chishti

Muslim leader
- Teacher: Qadir Shah Saeb

Rahim Sahab Sopori (Kashmiri: رحِم صٲبِ سوپورؠ; born Abdul Rahim Shah in 1775) was a Kashmiri Sufi saint and poet associated with the Qadiriyya and Chishti Sufi order. He is widely regarded as the greatest poet of Sopore and one of the greatest of the Kashmiri Language.

== Early life ==
Rahim Sopori was born in 1775 in Sopore, Kashmir. He spent his early life in Teliyan Mohalla, a locality in Sopore, where he received his spiritual education. His early life is not well documented, and there are different narratives about his family background. According to one view, he belonged to a cowherd family, which was a common occupation in rural Kashmir at the time. However, some scholars argue that he was more likely from a weaver's family, supported by the fact that he learned the art of weaving in Batpora, a neighborhood in Sopore known for its weaving tradition.

Kashmiri oral tradition preserves a key incident that set him on the Sufi Path. It is said that during a visit to the Tomb of Hazrat Syed Jamal-ud-Din Bukhari in Sopore, a young Sopori exchanged mystical verses with a pious woman. This poetic dialogue emphasized the importance of a spiritual guide (Murshid) in seeking the ultimate Truth. Inspired by the encounter, Sopori resolved to find a guide. Eventually he became a disciple of Peer Ghulam Qadir Malik, known as Hazrat Qadir Shah Saeb of Ranan Qaziyabad. Through this mentor he joined the Qadiri Sufi Silsala (order), a lineage tracing back to saint Abdul Qadir Gilani, and he also identified with the Chishti Order which traces back to Mu'in al-Din Chishti, one of the most prominent Sufi saints of the Indian sub-continent.

== Spiritualism ==
Under the guidance of his spiritual teacher (murshid), Rahim Sopori devoted himself to the Sufi path, spending his life in worship, reflection, and teaching. He gained a reputation as a true Sufi both in his personal conduct and his poetry. He lived simply, dedicated to God and the service of others.

Sopori preached Sufi values such as love, humility, patience, and remembrance of God, and wrote poetry that retold stories from the Quran in a gentle, lyrical style. His verses combine Kashmiri folk themes with Islamic spiritual ideas.

Sopori often mentioned his loyalty to the Qadiriyya Sufi order in his poetry. In one couplet written in Kashmiri, he names the Qadiri silsila (lineage), highlighting his love and dedication to his Sufi path. In another verse he similarly cites the Chishti Order. These affirmations underscore his firm roots in Kashmiri Islam's mystical tradition, while also honoring earlier local mystics (scholars note similarities with the Kashmiri saints Lalleshwari (Lal Ded) and Nund Rishi (Sheikh Noor-ud-Din) in his thought).

== Major works and themes ==
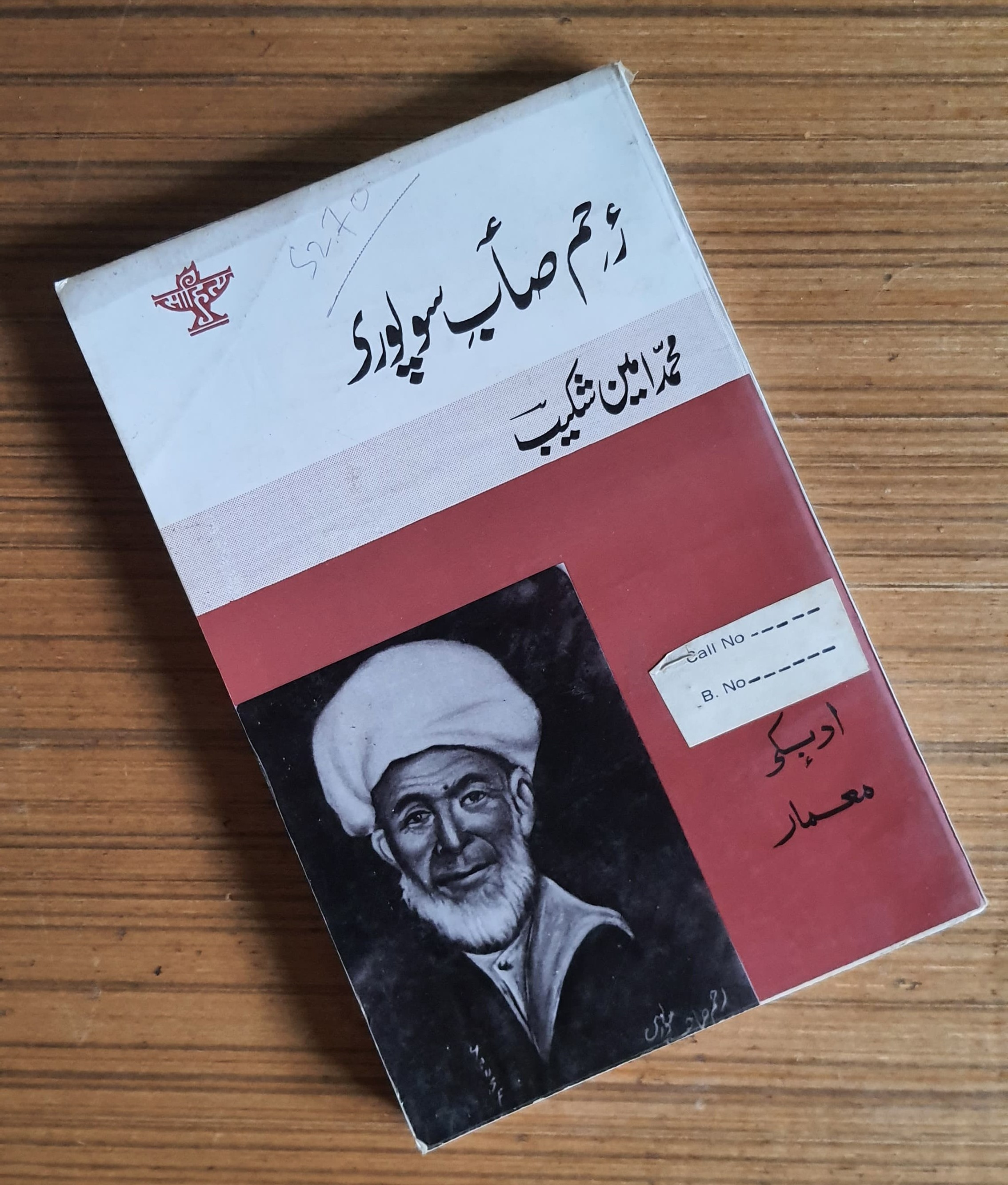
Rahim Sopori Biography by Mohammad Amin Shakeeb

The biography and the majority of the written works of Sopori were collected and preserved by educationalist Mohammad Amin Shakeeb, who went from village to village in Kashmir in search of poems by Sopori, and collected them in a work named "Rahim Sahab Sopori", first published in Urdu and later translated into English. Some of his poems are found in Shafi Shauq's work "Kashmiri Sufi Poetry".

Rahim Sopori wrote primarily in the Kashmiri language, and most of his surviving poetry is in Kashmiri. However, he also composed some verses in Persian, one of which was recited during Muhammad Iqbal's visit to Kashmir in 1931. His collected Kashmiri poems have been preserved in a volume dedicated to his work. His spiritual legacy was passed on through dozens of short poems and devotional songs, especially qaseedas (odes), that were memorized and passed down in Sufi circles across the Valley. His poetry often refers to the emotions of love, longing, and deep devotion. He often wrote from the perspective of the ashiq (the lover) searching for the Beloved, who is either God or sometimes symbolically the spiritual master. Many of his poems are also tributes to the Islamic prophet Muhammad.

Sopori's poetry blends different traditions, including free use of Sanskrit-derived words and Hindu mystical imagery, reflecting the syncretic culture of Sopore in his time. One scholar observed that Sopori's writings balance Islamic Sufi mysticism and elements of Kashmir Shaivism.

Another key feature of Sopori's poetry is his use of everyday Kashmiri idiom. Though he wrote in the Sopore dialect, he infused it with a mix of Persian, Arabic, and Sanskrit words. His verses became popular in Sufi mehfils (spiritual gatherings), where they were recited or sung over several generations.

== Historical and cultural context ==
Rahim Sopori lived from 1775 to around the 1850s, during a time of major political and cultural change in Kashmir. His life spanned the end of Afghan rule in Kashmir, the period of Sikh rule in Kashmir, and the beginning of the Dogra dynasty. Despite the political unrest and shifting rulers, Kashmir during this era continued to absorb influences from Central Asia and Persia. Spiritually, the valley had already been shaped by centuries of Sufi teachings, with saints like Nund Rishi and Lal Ded laying the foundations of mystical beliefs that blended Islamic and local traditions.

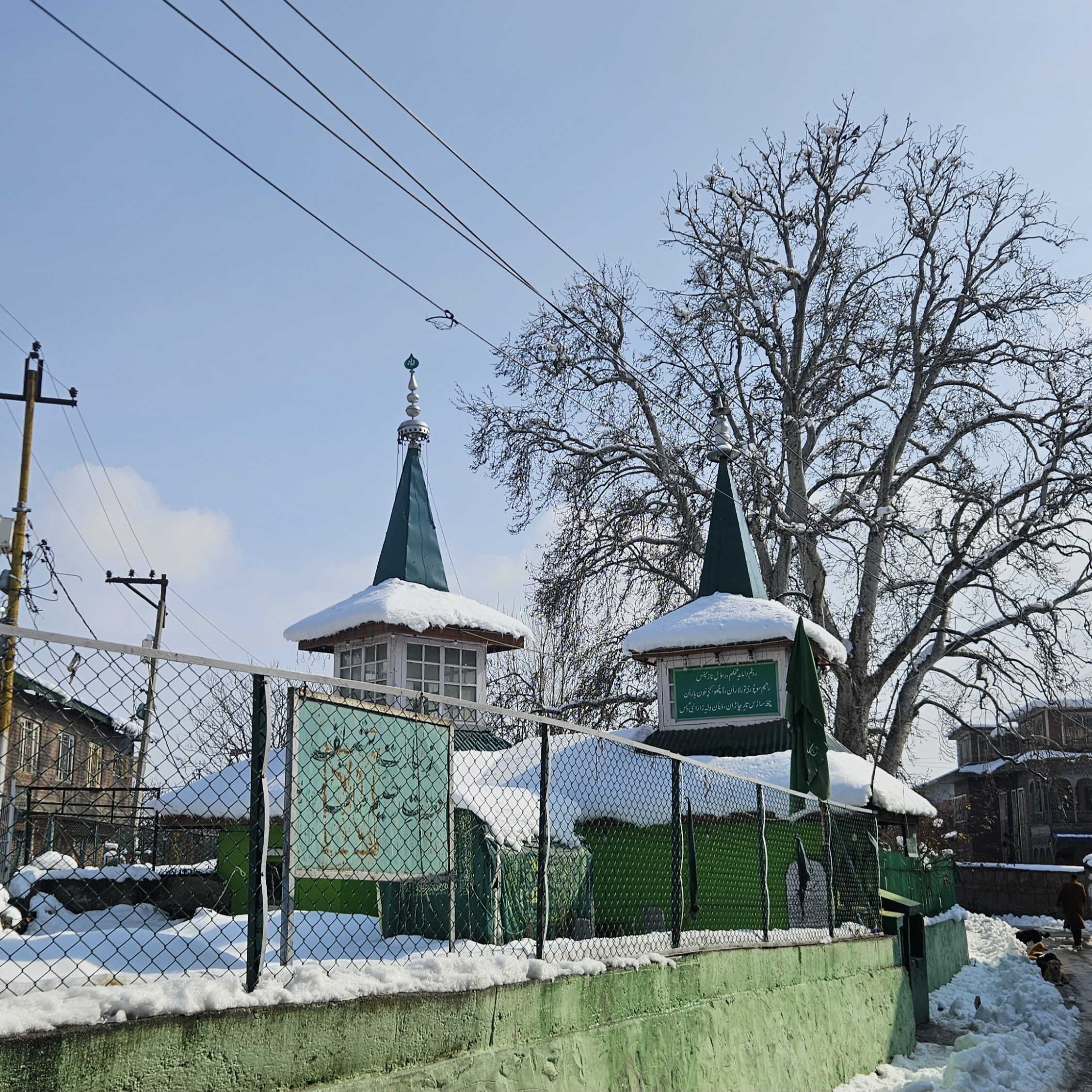
Ziyarat of Rahim Sahab Sopori in Teliyan, Sopore

Sopori contributed to this spiritual environment through his poetry. During this time, the Kashmiri language had become a refined medium of literature, and Rahim Sopori contributed to its literary growth. His poetry combined stories from the Quran, Sufi teachings, and symbols from Hindu mysticism, creating a style that was rooted in both Islamic faith and local culture.

Living in Sopore, an area with strong Shaivite history, Sopori included Sanskrit words and imagery in his Kashmiri poems. Yet his message was clearly Islamic, centered on divine love, spiritual longing, and ethical living. Many of his poems paraphrase or refer to Quranic events, but they are presented in simple verses that ordinary people could understand and relate to.

He was part of a larger tradition of Kashmiri Sufi poets who used the local language to express complex mystical ideas. By writing in Kashmiri, using folk metaphors and local expressions, he helped make spiritual teachings accessible to the common people. His influence paved the way for later Sufi poets in the Valley.

Belonging to the Qadiriyya Sufi order, and influenced also by the Chishti tradition, Sopori's teachings and poetry helped keep Sufi spiritualism alive in Kashmir through the 19th century, acting as a cultural and spiritual bridge between Kashmir's earlier Hindu-Buddhist heritage and its Islamic Sufi present.

In 1931, the poet and philosopher Muhammad Iqbal visited Kashmir. During his visit, local singers performed some of Rahim Sopori's Persian ghazals. Iqbal was reportedly very moved by the performance, remarking that "his own ancestors were from this land of saints".
