= Sopore =

Town in Baramulla, Jammu and Kashmir, India

- City
- The Municipal Council Of Sopore
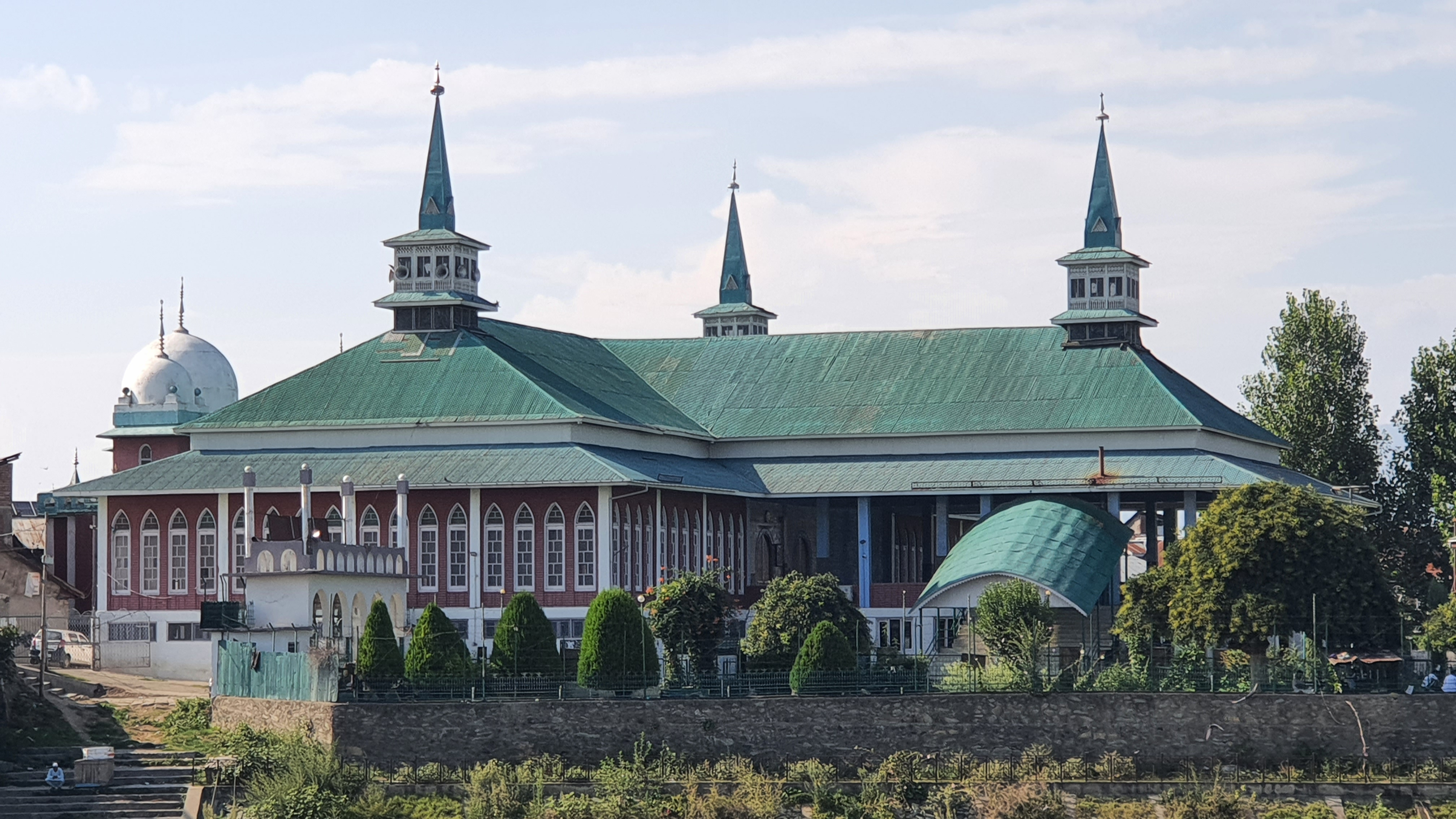
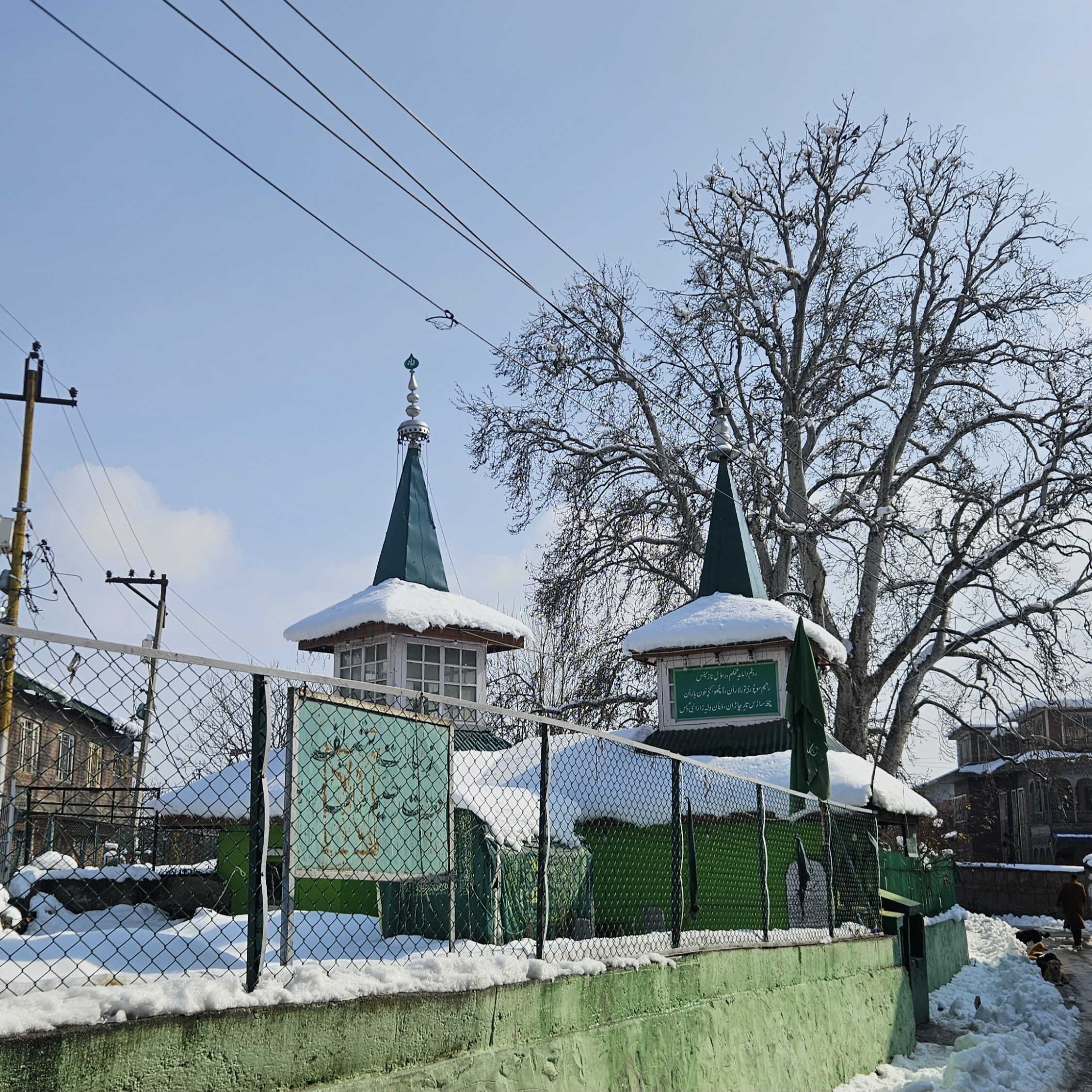
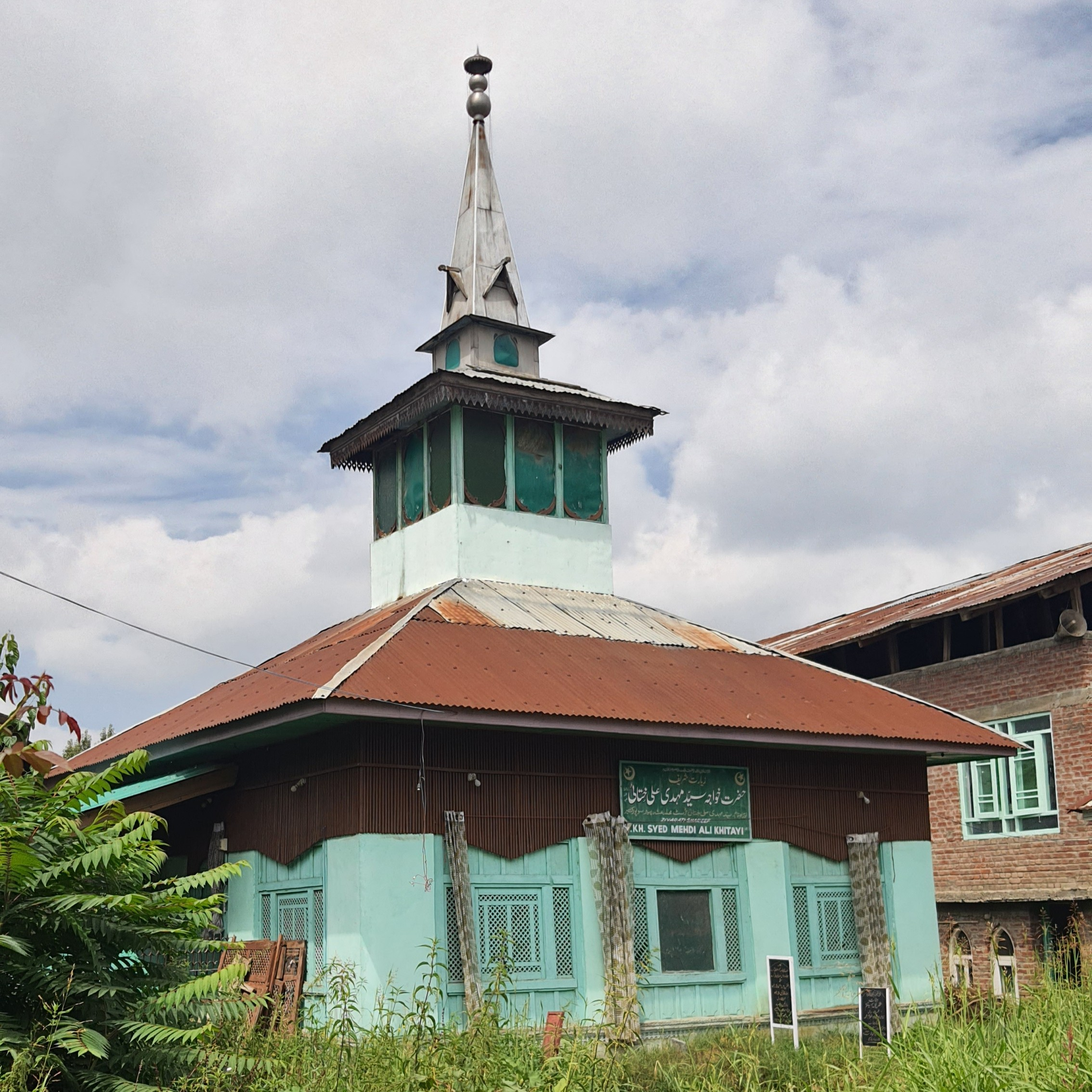
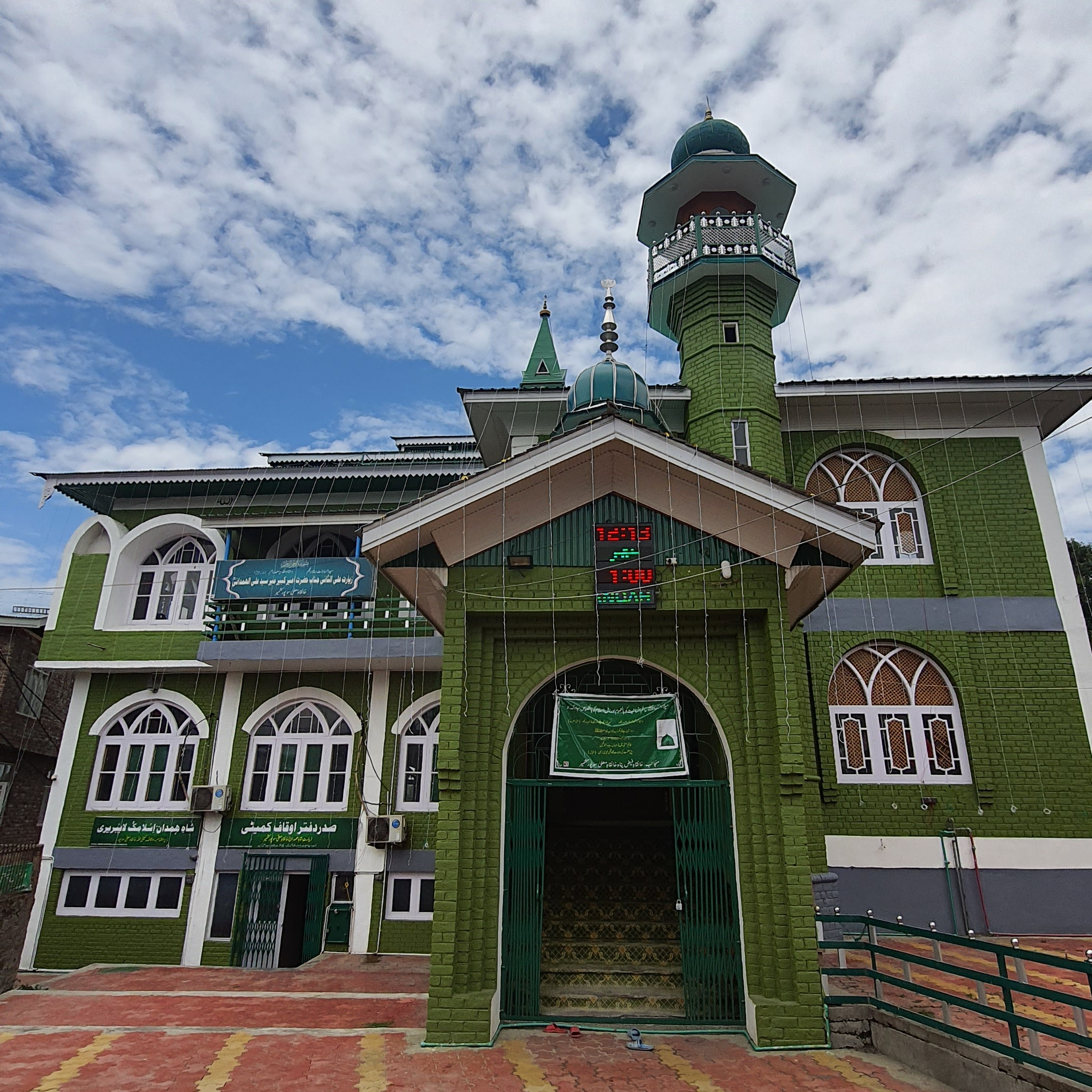
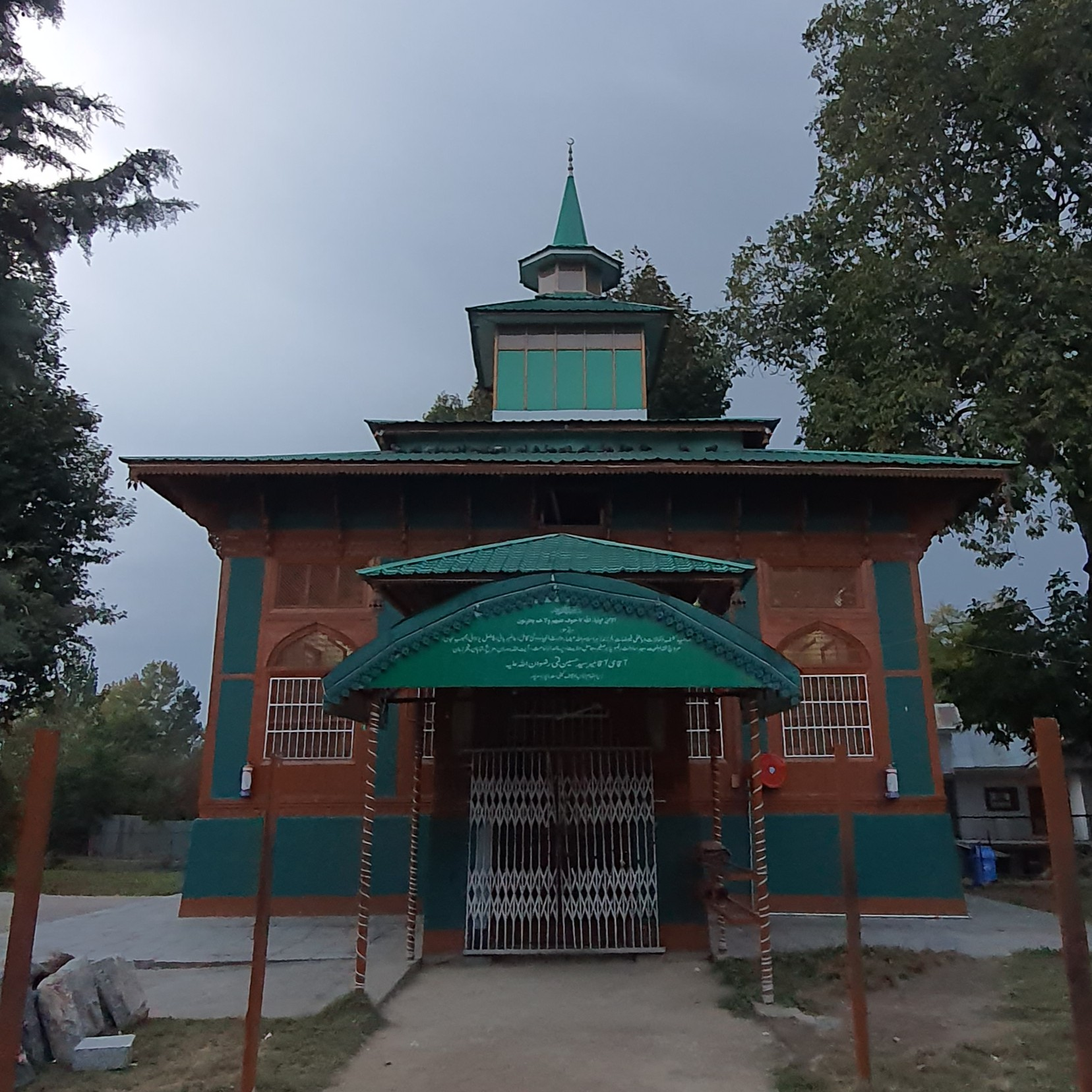
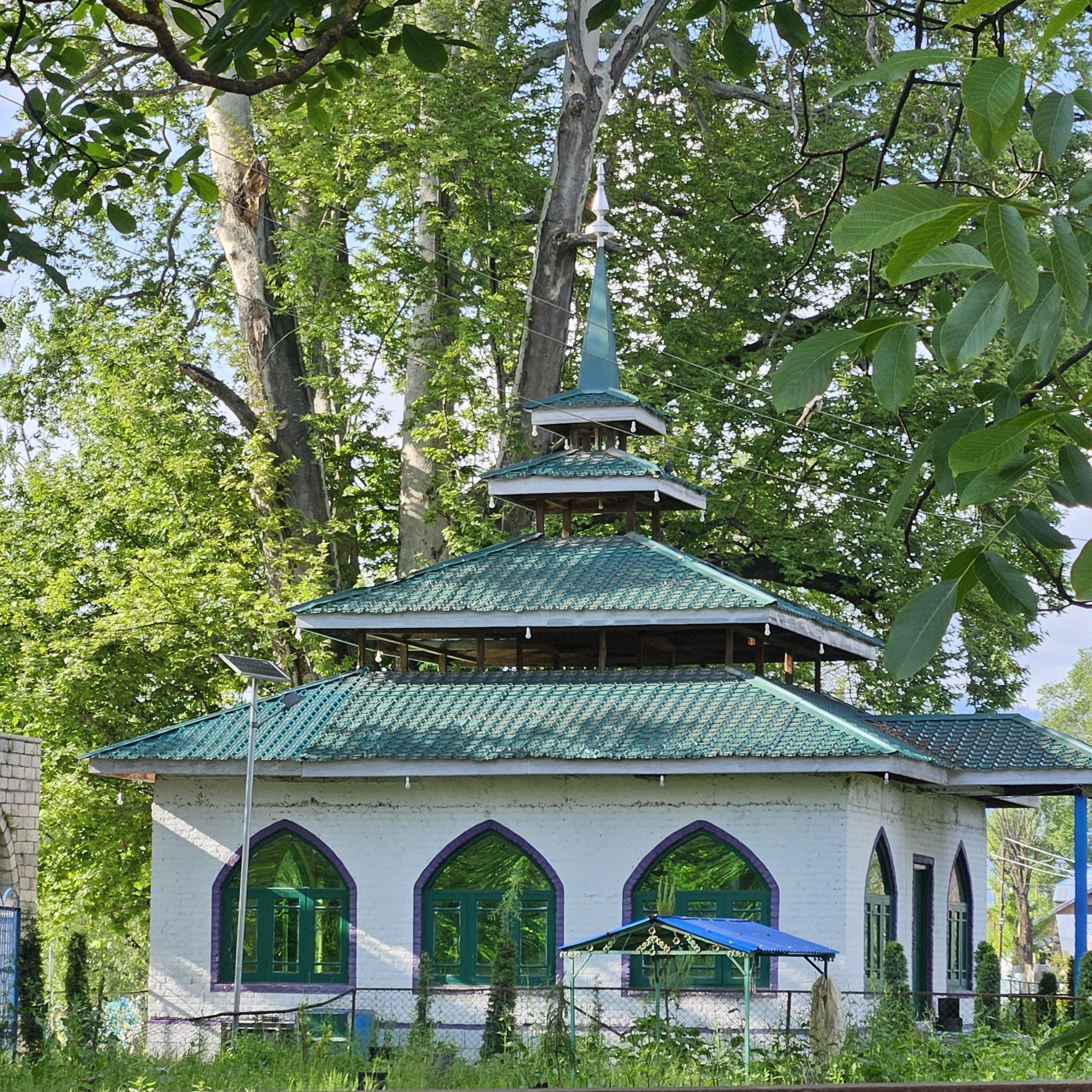
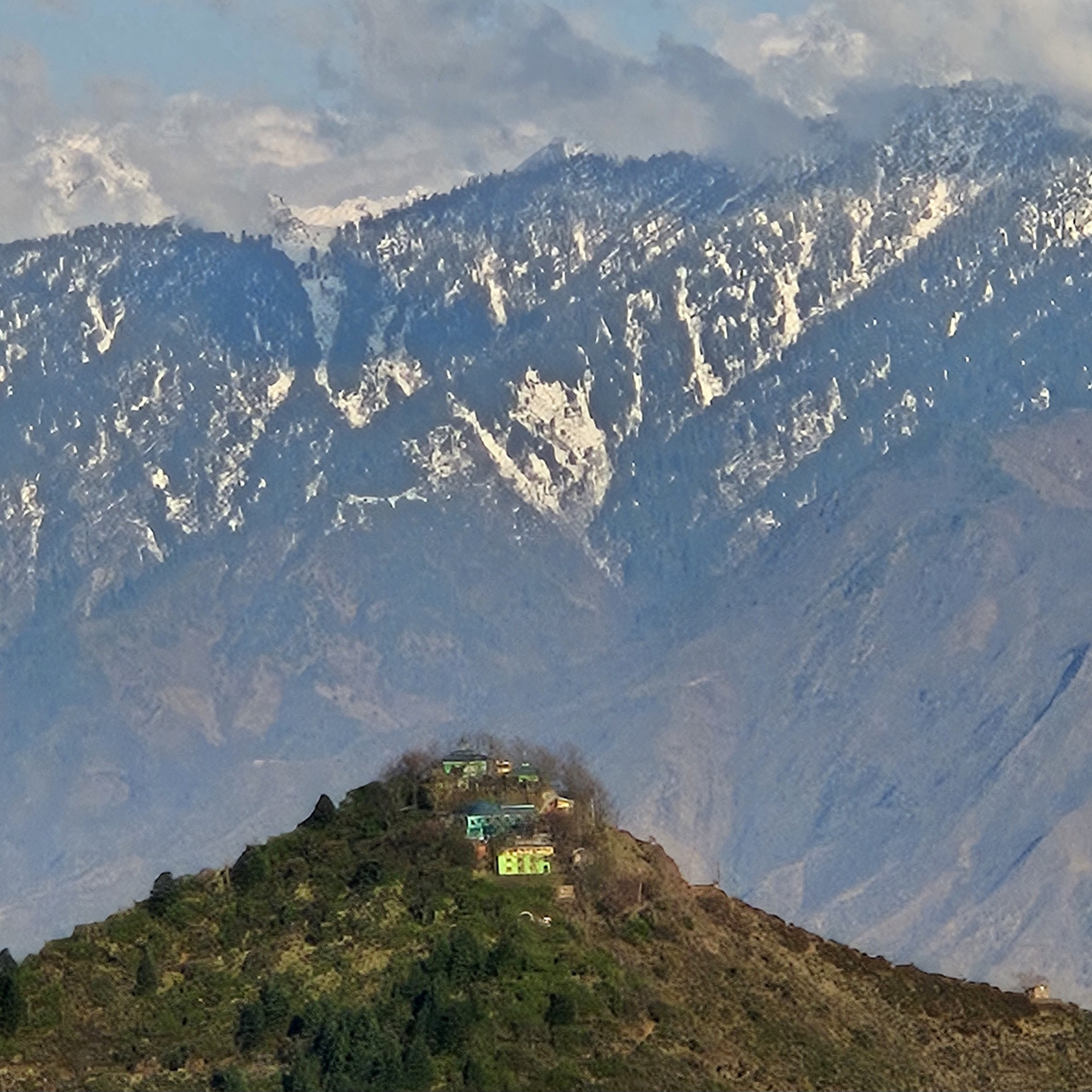
- Clockwise from top: Jamia Masjid of Sopore; Ziyarat Sharif Rahim Sopori; Ziyarat Sharif Mehdi Ali Khatai; Khanqah e Moula Sopore; Ziyarat Sharif of Aqa Syed Hussain Qumi; Ziyarat Sharif Sheikh Noor ud-Din Wali; and Ziyarat Baba Shukur ud-Din Wali
- Nickname: Chota London (Mini London) Or Apple Town
- Location in Jammu and Kashmir, India Sopore (India)
- Coordinates: 34.30°N 74.47°E
- Country: India
- Union territory: Jammu and Kashmir
- District: Baramulla
- First Settled: 855-883 A.D
- Incorporated as Tehsil: 1883
- Founder: Suyya

Government
  - Type: Democratic (MLA)
  - Body: Municipal Council Sopore
  - MLA: Irshad Rasool Kar (Jammu & Kashmir National Conference)
  - Additional Deputy Commissioner: S.A Raina

Area
  - Total: 18.90 km^{2} (7.30 sq mi)
  - Rank: 5

Population (2011)
  - Total: 71,292
  - Rank: 6
  - Density: 3,772/km^{2} (9,770/sq mi)
- Demonym(s): Sopruk, Sopori, Soporian, Soporewale

Languages
  - Official: Kashmiri, Urdu, Hindi, Dogri, English
  - Spoken: Kashmiri

Demographics
  - Literacy rate: 70.8%
  - Sex ratio: 897.6 ♀/ 1000 ♂
- Time zone: UTC+5:30 (IST)
- Pin Code: 193201 (Sopore City And Zaingair Block)
- Telephone code: 01954
- Vehicle registration: JK-05

Sopore (Sopar) (Urdu pronunciation: [soːpoːr] ; Kashmiri pronunciation: [soːpoːr]) is a city in the Baramulla district of Jammu and Kashmir. It is 45 km (28 mi) north-west of Srinagar, and 16 km (10 mi) north-east of Baramulla.

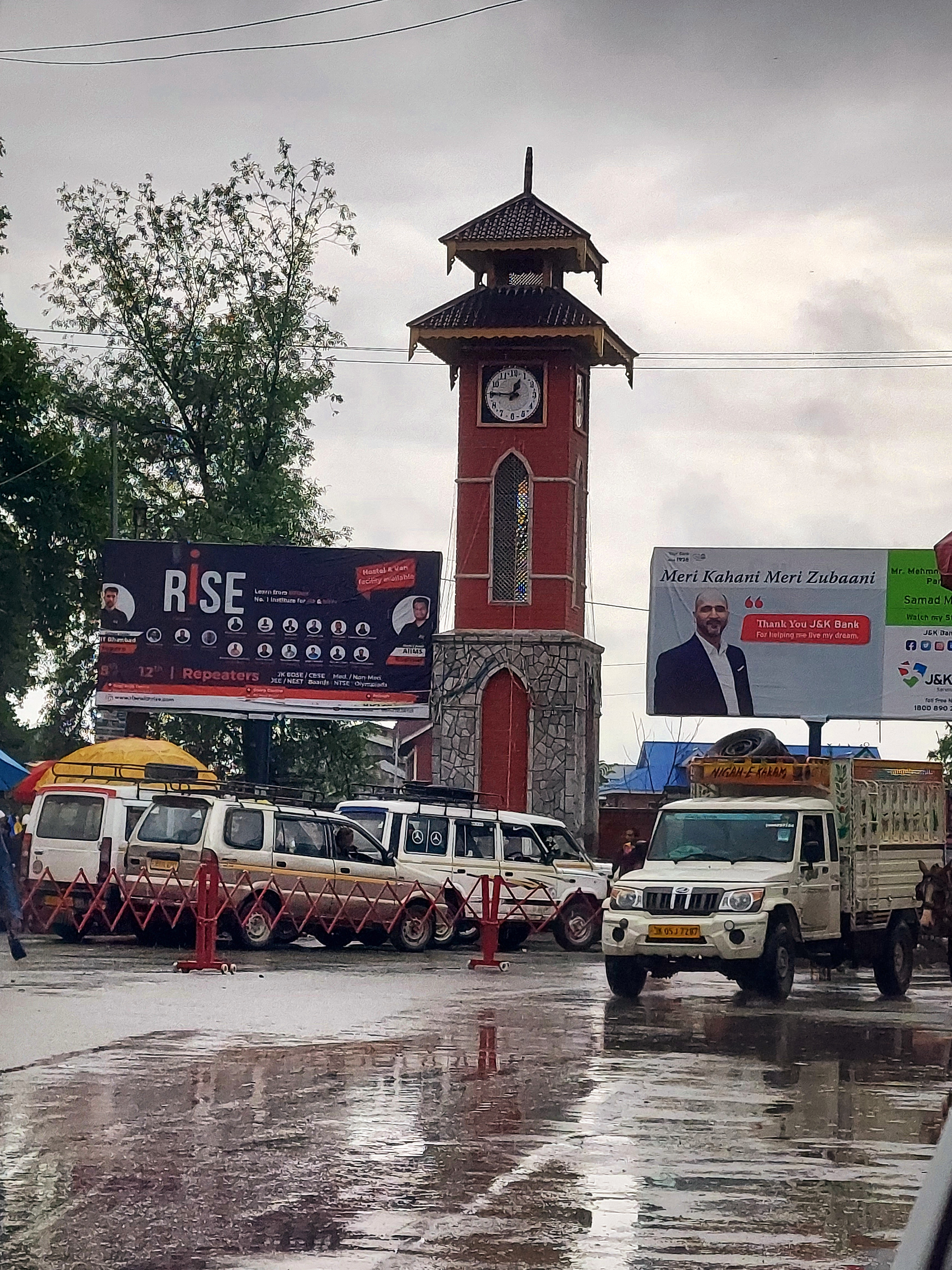
Clock Tower at Iqbal Market Sopore

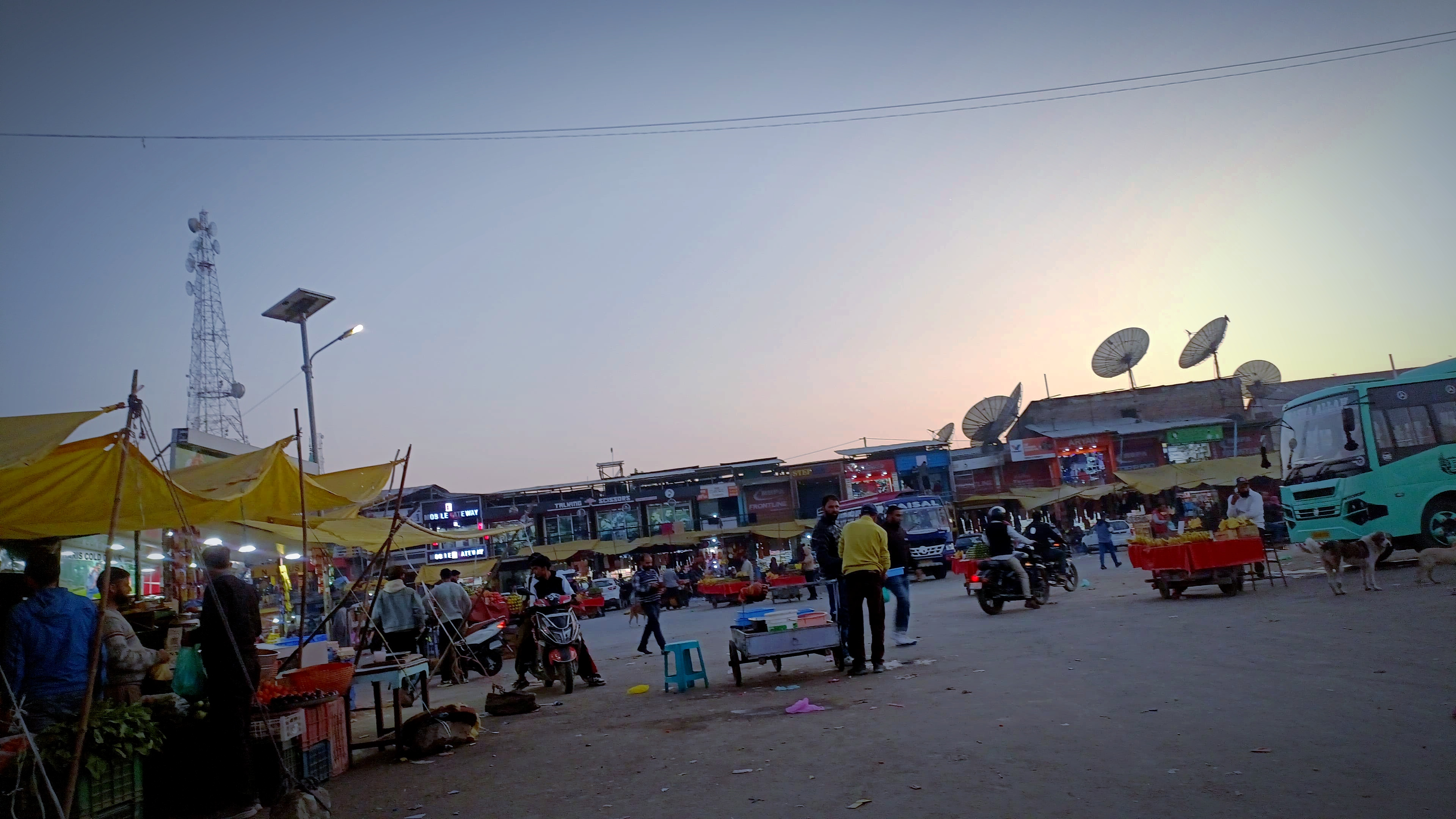
General Bus Stand Sopore

Sopore is one of the largest subdivisions in Jammu and Kashmir, consisting of seven tehsils and the state's oldest existing subdivision. Recognized as an urban area right from the 1911 census. Sopore has long been a central business hub in North Kashmir. Its historical significance, coupled with its economic role, underscores its prominent position in the region.

Sopore features Asia's second-largest fruit mandi, located at Nowpora Kalan Sopore , approximately 2 km away from the main town, boasting an annual turnover of over ₹3000 crore. This mandi facilitates around 40 percent of the apple production and sales in the Kashmir Valley, which has led to Sopore being known as the 'Apple Town of Kashmir'. Additionally, Wular Lake, one of Asia's largest freshwater lakes, lies between Sopore and the Bandipore district. Wular Lake is a major source of fish for the Kashmir Valley and is also distinguished for its production of water chestnuts, enhancing the region's economic and ecological significance.

Municipal Council Sopore is a local urban body that administers the city of Sopore. There are 21 wards in Sopore M.Cl (Municipal Council) and two OG's (Outgrowths), as Amargarh and Nowpora Kalan.

Old Sopur is settled on both banks of the Jhelum River. This historic area is known for its densely packed network of 30-35 mohallas. Some mohallas include Hatishah, Jamia Qadeem, Khanqah, Chankhan, Untoo Hamam, Sofi Hamam, Now Hamam, Batpora, Ashpeer, Khushal Matoo, Muslim Peer, Kralteng, Sangrampora, Maharajpora, Arampora, Teliyan, and Takyabal. Each mohalla has its own character and history, together forming a part of Old Sopur.

New Sopore began to take shape in the mid-20th century, starting with its first planned colony, New Colony. Over time, this development expanded to include a variety of other colonies, such as Noor Bagh, Iqbal Nagar, Badam Bagh, Baba Raza, Siddiq Colony, Model Town, Shah Kirman Colony, Krankshivan Colony and New Light Colony, among others. Each of these neighborhoods was designed with modern infrastructure and amenities, reflecting the region's growth and enhancement of urban living standards.

Sopore division encompasses the city of Sopore, several nearby villages such as Tarzoo, Wagub, Adipora, Seer Jagir, and others, along with a historically notable region known as the Zaingair belt. This belt comprises numerous villages such as Dangerpora, Dooru, Mundji, Hardshiva, Warpora, Botingoo, Hathlangoo, Wadoora, Tujar Sharif, Brath Kalan, Bomai, Seelo, Logripora, Zaloora, and many more. Each of these villages plays a vital role in supporting and sustaining the economy of the Sopore region.

== Markets and Commercial Centers ==
Old Sopore is home to a historic marketplace that has been a central hub for trade and commerce for over a century. This marketplace is locally known as Bada Bazar, which serves as the main market of Sopore. Running parallel to Bada Bazar is its counterpart, the narrower Chota Bazar. Together, these markets host a diverse range of retail and wholesale establishments, including general stores, grocery shops, cloth merchants, readymade garment shops, copper shops, goldsmiths, and various other shops. Chota Bazar is also renowned for its prominent fish market, often referred to as Gaade Bazar.

Main Chowk Sopore, often called Samad Talkies Chowk after the Samad Talkies cinema that once stood there, is the town's central intersection. It connects Bada Bazar and Chota Bazar on one side, Iqbal Market on the opposite side, and Super Bazar and Tehsil Road on the remaining two sides.

Since 1947, the town's market has expanded at least fivefold. This expansion included the development of Iqbal Market, which became a centre of commercial activity. The market hosts a weekly Sunday market where vendors sell a variety of goods. Iqbal Market is connected to Shah Faisal Market and the General Bus Stand Market, forming part of the town's main commercial district.

Other significant markets in Sopore include Chankhan Market, Downtown, and Tehsil Road, which is commonly referred to as Bugu. The New Colony area, located near the General Bus Stand, has grown from Sopore's first planned colony into a major commercial hub. Additionally, Amargarh and the Sopore Bypass are rapidly developing into prominent commercial zones, further enhancing the city's economic landscape.

== History ==
Sopore was earlier known as "Suyyapura" in Antiquity. Suyyapura, founded by a reputed Kashmiri engineer Suyya during the reign of Raja Awantivarma (855-883 A.D.) and commemorating his name, is undoubtedly the town known now as Sopore.

J.P. Ferguson, in his book entitled 'Kashmir', remarks, "Suyya stands out as a person hundreds of years in advance of his time". It is because of the technical intelligence and real skill he possessed and applied for draining off the flood water, which could find no outlet and had made the cultivation of land impossible, with the result that famine-like conditions prevailed in the whole of the valley. That is why, in the light of the results achieved by this great engineer, he has been regarded as an incarnation of the Lord of Food himself by the great historian Kalhana in his book 'Rajatarangini'. Suyya's reputation attracted many persons who also settled at the place he resided, and which eventually came to be known as Suyyapura, meaning the place where Suyya settled. With the passage of time and constant use, the pronunciation of the name was distorted into Sopore, by which it is known at present.

M.A. Stein, the English translator of Kalhanas 'Rajatarangini' in his book 'Memoir on maps illustrating the Ancient Geography of Kashmir' published in 1899, (p. 208) while writing about Sopore town, remarks: Sopore, which lies a short distance below the point where the Vitasta leaves the Wular, has retained its importance to this day and is still a town of over 8,000 inhabitants. It has, during recent times, been the official headquarters for the whole of Kamraj. From a passage of Srivara, it appears that this had been the case already at an earlier period. Relating a great conflagration which destroyed Suyyapura in Zain-ul-Abidin's time, this chronicle tells us that in it perished the whole of the official archives relating to Kamarajya. The royal residence, however, escaped, and the town itself was again built up by the King in great splendour. Of this, however, nothing has remained; nor does the town now show older remains of any interest." As will be clear from the history of the town narrated above, there is no trace left of any historical buildings or ancient monuments that could throw some light on the past. It is quite likely that the ancient remains might have been destroyed in the conflagration that broke out during the reign of Zain-ul-Abdin (1420-1470 A.D.).

=== Kashmir Sultanate era ===
In 1459, Sopur was attacked by Adam Khan, son of the sultan Zain-ul-Abidin, during a rebellion against his father. The town's governor resisted, but he was defeated and killed, and Adam had the town destroyed. Zain-ul-Abidin responded by sending an army to Sopur, and they routed Adam's forces in a pitched battle. While Adam and his followers were fleeing across the Jhelum at Sopur, the bridge collapsed and 300 of his followers drowned in the river.

At some point late in Zain-ul-Abidin's reign, the town of Sopur was destroyed by fire (this might be a duplicate reference to Adam Khan's destruction of Sopur; the source isn't clear about this). Sometime after this happened, Zain-ul-Abidin built a new palace at Sopur; another palace at Baramula was demolished at this point, and its materials were used to build the new palace at Sopur. Zain-ul-Abidin also had a swinging bridge constructed at Sopur during his reign.

The swinging bridge continued to be the sole communication link across the river until 1955, when it was discarded in favour of an R.C.C. bridge constructed about half a mile downstream. Lately the old bridge has also been reconstructed and thrown open to traffic.

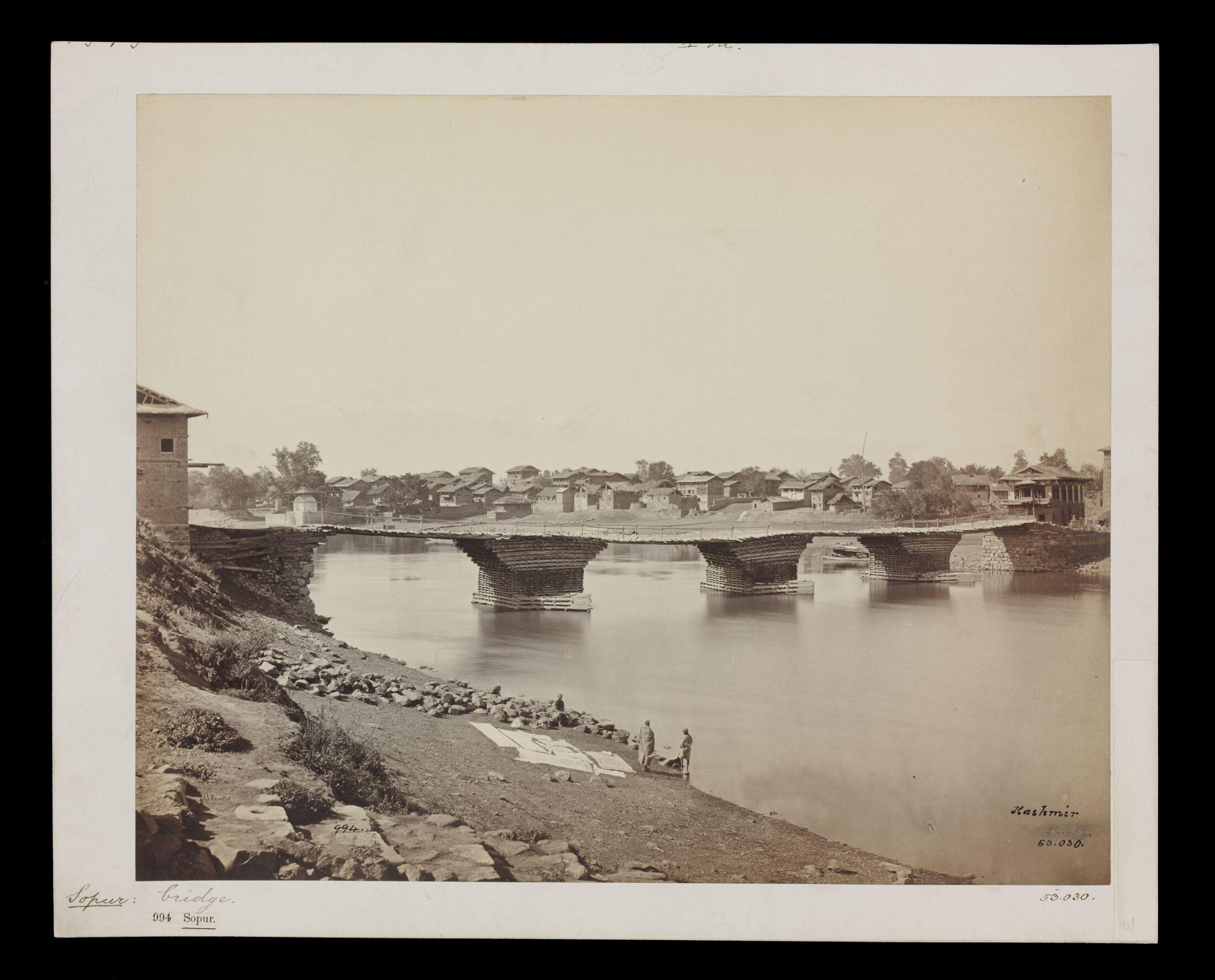
Sopur Bridge, photograph by Samuel Bourne in 1864

== Demographics ==
As of the 2011 India census, Sopore urban area had a population of 71,292 and an area of 18.9 km^{2} (7.3 sq mi). The urban area consisted of the city, which had a municipal council and some outgrowths. In the 2011 census, the city had a population of 61,098 and an area of 9.90 km^{2} (3.82 sq mi). In the urban area, there were 37,570 males (53%) and 33,722 females (47%). Of the population, 9,329 (13.1%) were age 0-6: 5,042 males (54%) and 4,287 females (46%). The literacy rate for people over six was 70.8% (males 78.6%, females 62.3%).

Historical Population
Year	1911	1921	1931	1941	1951	1961	1971	1981	2001	2011
Pop.	8,514	8,524	10,982	11,770	15,378	18,987	27,697	33,584	59,624	71,292
±%	—	+0.1%	+28.8%	+7.2%	+30.7%	+23.5%	+45.9%	+21.3%	+77.5%	+19.6%

== Administration ==
Sh. Shabir Ahmad Raina is serving as the ADC (Additional Deputy Commissioner) Sopore, and Iftkhar Talib (JKPS) as SP (Superintendent of Police) Sopore.

== Education ==
The main public educational institutions in Sopore are:

- Government Degree College, Sopore
- Government Degree College for Women, Sopore
- Sher-e-Kashmir University of Agricultural Sciences and Technology Wadoora, Sopore.
- Sopore Law College

== Notable people ==
- Atiqa Bano, educationist
- Syed Ali Shah Geelani, politician
- Afzal Guru, separatist
- Ghulam Rasool Kar, politician
- Rahim Sopori Sufi Saint and Poet
- Saifi Sopori, poet and teacher
- Abdul Ahad Vakil, politician
- Baba Shukur ud-Din Wali Sufi Saint from the Rishi Order Lived here on Sharikot Hill near Wular Lake in the 15th C.E
