= Yaqub Sarfi Kashmiri =

Kashmiri Muslim polymath

Shaykh Yaqub Sarfi
- یعقوب صرفی
- Born: Yaqub Ganai Asmi; 1522; Srinagar, Kashmir Sultanate (present-day Jammu and Kashmir
- Died: 20 July 1595 (aged 72–73); Srinagar, Mughal Kashmir
- Known for: Role in Mughal conquest of Kashmir, Persian and Arabic literary works,
- Notable work: Maslak-ul-Akhyar, Maṭlab al-Ṭālibīn

Personal life
- Main interest(s): Hadith, Aqidah, Fiqh, Sufism, poetry

Religious life
- Religion: Islam
- Denomination: Sunni
- Jurisprudence: Hanafi
- Tariqa: Kubrawiya, Chisti

Muslim leader
- Influenced by: Nizami, Jami, Hamza Makhdoom, Mir Sayyid Ali Hamadani
- Influenced: Ahmad Sirhindi, Sayyid Adam Banuri, Habibullah Nowshehri, Abd al-Qadir Badayuni, Shah Qasim Haqqani

Yaqub Ganai Asmi (Note: Persian: یعقوب صرفی کشمیری) (1522 – 20 July 1595), commonly known as Yaqub Sarfi Kashmiri or Eishan Sehab was a Kashmiri Islamic scholar, theologian, jurist, poet, and statesman. Associated with the Kubrawi-Hamadani and Chishti Sufi orders, he is regarded as one f the prominent scholars of Kashmir during the 16th century. He contributed to Persian and Arabic literature and Islamic religious scholarship, and is said to have played a role in the political developments that lead to the Mughal conquest of Kashmir in 1586.

== Early life and education ==
Yaqub Ganai Asmi was born in 1522 (Note: from Hijri year 928.) in Srinagar, Kashmir Sultanate, during the reign of Sultan Muhammad Shah Mir. He was the son of Hassan Ganai Asmi, who served in the royal administration and held land grants. His family belonged to the Asmi clan which traces its lineage to Asim ibn Umar, the son of the second Rashidun caliph Umar.

Sarfi memorised the Quran at the age of seven. His received his early education from his father and studied under several scholars, including Maulana Akhwand Bashir and Maulana Muhammad Aini and Mulla Razi. Aini had studied under the Persian poet Abdul Rehman Jami in Herat and gave Sarfi the title Jami Sani (the second Jami). Sarfi acquired the surname Sarfi, associated with his proficiency in Arabic grammar.

After completing his studied in religious sciences, Arabic and Persian literature, grammar, philosophy and Islamic jurisprudence, Sarfi travelled outside Kashmir. He visited Khwarazm, where he became a disciple of Hussain Khwarazmi, a spiritual master of the Kubrawi order. Furing his travels he met several scholars and Sufi figures in Central Asia and the Middle East. He subsequently travelled to Mecca for Hajj pilgrimage, and visited Baghdad and other centres of Islamic learning along the way. In Mecca., he studied under the hadith scholar Ibn Hajar, who granted him ijazah (license to transmit knowledge) to teach prophetic traditions. During his travels, he also met Salim Chisti in India and became associated with his Chisti order.

== Career ==
Sarfi is associated with the introduction of the Chisti order in the valley. Its practices included emphasis on social service and welfare of the community.

He maintained associations with prominent scholars of the Mughal court, including ʽAbd al-Qadir Badayuni and Abul Fazl's brother, Faizi. In a letter written around 1594, after returning to Kashmir from Lahore, Sarfi referred to his association with Faizi and expressed his continued friendship with Badayuni.

Sarfi also taught Islamic sciences and Sufism to students from different regions. Among those he taught was Ahmad Sirhindi, who received instruction in hadith and Sufism during his stay in India. Abul Fazl regarded Sarfi as one of the great authorities on religious matters. Mohsin Fani describes Sarfi as a great scholar and teacher who taught thousands of students such as Ahmad Sirhindi and ʽAbd al-Qadir Badayuni.

Kashmiri Sufi poet, Khawaja Habibullah Nowshehri was also among Sarfi's disciple within the Kubrawi-Hamdani Sufi tradition.

He maintained a collection of religious manuscripts and books acquired during his travels, covering subjects such as hadith, Quranic exegesis, jurisprudence and Sufism. He reportedly established a library in Kashmir.

== Political role ==
Sarfi served as an intermediary between Akbar and the Kashmiri ruler Yousuf Shah Chak. In 1582, he accompanied a Mughal summons requesting Yusuf shah to appear at the imperial court. The ruler instead sent his son Prince Yaqub.

Sarfi was also involved in the political resistance against Chak dynasty rule. During the later Chak rule, religious tensions and persecution of Sunni Muslims contributed to unrest in the valley. The resistance was initially led by Hamza Makhdoom, but after his death the movement was carried on by Sarfi.

When Qazi Musa, a Sunni Jurist was killed by Yaqub Shah Chak, Sarfi along with the theologian and poet Baba Dawood Khaki, led a delegation to Akbar's court, requesting the annexation of Kashmir. According to accounts of the negotiation, they sought assurances concerning religious freedom, protection from forced labour and preservation of Kashmir's internal affairs. The Mughal annexation of Kashmir took place in 1586.

== Literary works ==
Sarfi was a prolific writer in Persian and Arabic. His poetic works included mathnawis, ghazals, rubaiyat and qasidas. His literary style was influenced by the Persian poets Nizami and Jami.

His writings included:

- Maṭlab al-Ṭālibīn fī Tafsīr Kalām Rabb al-‘Ālamīn: An Arabic exegesis of the Quran. Although the surviving material is incomplete and consists only of exegesis of al-Fatiha and the ﬁrst sixty-two verses of al-Baqarah. The content of this tafsīr makes it the only tafsir of its kind written by a Kashmiri scholar. The tafsīr remains in manuscript form and is preserved in the manuscript section of the Department of Libraries and Research, JK Government, albeit in a deplorable condition. The manuscript comprises of 192 folios and is registered under accession number 4.
- Sharh-i-Bukhari and Sharh-i-Thulāthiyyāt: a Persian commentary of Sahih al-Bukhari.
- Diwan-e-Sarfi: collection of his Persian poetry.
- Manasik-ul-Hajj: Arabic work concerning the Hajj pilgrimage to Mecca.
- Risala-i-Zikriya (importance of zikr)
- Sawati-ul-Ilham
- Kunz-ul-Jawahir

His five principal poetic works, collectively known as his Khamsa (five Treasures), were:

- Maslak-ul-Akhyar: A treatise on Sufism, comprising approximately 4,050 couplets and completed in 1589.
- Maghariz-ul-Nabi: A poetic work dealing with the life and military campaigns of the Islamic prophet Muhammad, completed in 1591.
- Maqamat-i-Murshid: A work about the life and spiritual teachings of his spiritual guide, Hassan Khwarizmi.
- Wamiq-u-Azra: A Persian mathnawi composed in 1585, described as an imitation of Nizami's Khosrow and Shirin.
- Laila Majnun: A Persian poetic retelling of the story of Layla and Majnun, composed in 1589.

== Death and legacy ==
Yaqub Sarfi died on 20 July 1595. (Note: From Didamari's Waqiat-i-Kashmir, which mentions his death on a Thursday night, 12 Dhu'l-Qa'da 1003 AH) He was buried in the Zaina Kadal neighbourhood of Srinagar, on the western side of the Jhelum River. His shrine is known as Ziyarat-i-Eishan, and is visited by devotees, particularly during religious festivals and his annual urs.

Nowshehri documented Sarfi's life, travels and spiritual lineage in Maqamat-i-Eishan (The Stations of the Master), a Persian biographical work in rhyming couplets completed in 1602.

Abd al-Qadir Badayuni after Sarfi's death, decribed him as "a great scholar of the world."

== See also ==
- Mirza Akmal-ud-Din Kamil Badakhshi
- Nund Rishi

== Sources ==
- Bamzai, Prithivi Nath Kaul (1962). A History of Kashmir (PDF). Delhi: Metropolitan Book Co. Private Ltd.
- Sheikh, Bashir Ahmad (2012). The Impact of Sufism on Socio-economic and Cultural Conditions of the Jammu and Kashmir (16th–18th C.). Under the supervision of Dr. S. Liyaqat Hussain Moini. Aligarh U.P.: Centre of Advanced Study Department of History Aligarh Muslim University.
- Khoyihami, Ghulam Hassan (1960). Tarikh-i-Hassan: Tazkira-e-Awliya-e-Kashmir تاریخ حسن: تذکرۂ اولیاۓ کشمیر (in Urdu). In handwriting of Qazi Mohammad Hussain. MaharajGanj Srinagar: Ghulam Mohd. Noor Mohd. Tajraan-e-Kutub. pp. 192–197.
- Didamari, Muhammed Azam (2019). Waqiat-e-Kashmir واقعات کشمیر [Events of Kashmir] (in Urdu). Translated by Shams-ud-Din, Ahmad. from original Persian (1747) (5th ed.). Srinagar: Jammu and Kashmir Islamic Research Centre. pp. 176–178. ISBN 81-8304-000-4.
