= Nowshera, Srinagar =

Place in Srinagar, Jammu and Kashmir

Nowshera Noushera Naushahr
- Interactive Map of Nowshera, Srinagar
- Coordinates: 34.129977°N 74.805308°E
- Country: India
- Union territory: Jammu and Kashmir
- District: Srinagar
- Settled: Ancient
- Elevation: 1,592 m (5,223 ft)

Languages
  - Official: Kashmiri, Urdu, Hindi, Dogri, English
- Time zone: UTC+5:30 (IST)
- PIN: 190011
- Telephone code: 0194
- Vehicle registration: JK 01
- Distance from Delhi: 857 kilometres (533 mi)
- Distance from Mumbai: 2,182.4 kilometres (1,356.1 mi)

Nowshera, (Note: Urdu pronunciation: [nɔːʃɛɦɾɑː]; Kashmiri pronunciation: [naʋʃahar]; locally pronounced Nowshahar) also spelled as Noushera, Nowshehra, or Naushahr (from Persian: نوشہرہ, romanized: Naushahra, lit. 'new city'), is a notified area in Srinagar, Jammu and Kashmir, India. Located north of Srinagar's old city, it was established during the reign of Sultan Zayn al-Abidin (r. 1420–1470) and served as the capital of Kashmir Sultanate during part of his reign.

== History ==
=== Foundation and development ===
The history of Nowshera dates to the reign of Sultan Zayn al-Abidin (r. 1420–1470), commonly known as Budshah, who established the area as a new urban centre of Kashmir Sultanate. Historical accounts associate the foundation of the settlement with a major flood that struck Kashmir in the 15th century, following a period of severe famine. Continuous rainfall and the melting of mountain snow caused the tributaries of the Jhelum River to overflow, resulting in widespread destruction in Srinagar, particularly in low-lying areas. Following the flood, Zayn al-Abidin relocated the capital from Sikandarpuri (present-day Nowhatta) to the higher ground north of Koh-i-Maran (Hari Parbat), where he founded the town of Naushahr (Nowshera).

Some historical sources describe Naushahr as the central part of a larger urban settlement known as Zainanagar, founded in 1439 CE. The chronicler Jonaraja also referred to the city as extending from the outskirts of Hari Parbat to Amberhor, encompassing areas corresponding to present-day Lalbazar, Hawal, Nowshera, Vichar Nag, Awanta Bhawan, and Soura.

The city was laid out according to a planned urban design, featuring stone-paved roads and improved residential structures. During this period, the Nallah Mar canal was excavated to connect Dal Lake with Anchar Lake, diverting water away from the older parts of Srinagar. Stone bridges were constructed across the canal, while its banks became lined with the residences of officials and merchants.

=== Zaina Dab and institutions ===
Zayn al-Abidin constructed a palace at Naushahr in 1464 CE, known as Zaina Dab (Zain's royal pavilion). Mirza Haidar Dughlat (d.1555) described the palace as consisting of twelve storeys, each containing fifty rooms, with a gilded dome and halls decorated with glass panels. The palace was reportedly destroyed by fire during unrest involving the Chaks, although its remains are said to have survived until 1561.

An educational institution, mentioned in historic accounts as Dar-ul-Ulum Naushahr, also referred to as Madrassah Sultani, was also established by Zayn al-Abidin near his palace. The scholar Mulla Kabir was appointed to supervise the institution, which survived until the 17th century. Historical accounts also state that residential accommodations were provided in the area, for foreign scholars who migrated to Kashmir during the Sultan's rule.

=== Crafts and cultural heritage ===
The Sultan is also credited with introducing papier-mâché, papermaking, and bookbinding craftsmanship to the locality. In 1895, Lawrence wrote that the papermakers were settled in Nawshahr, where around thirty-six families remained engaged in the craft during the late 19th century. The locality still contains an area known as Kagazgari Mohalla, a name associated with the historical papermaking community.

Nowshera was also the birthplace and home of Khawaja Habibullah Nowshehri (c. 1555 – c. 1617), a Kashmiri Sufi poet and scholar. His shrine, located in the locality, remains a notable religious and cultural site where his urs is observed annually.

== Geography ==
Nowshera is situated within the municipal limits of Srinagar, approximately 9.9 km (6.2 mi) north of the city centre. The area is bounded by Soura and Awanta Bhawan to the north, Zadibal to the south, Lal Bazar to the east and Zunimar to the west.

== Landmarks ==
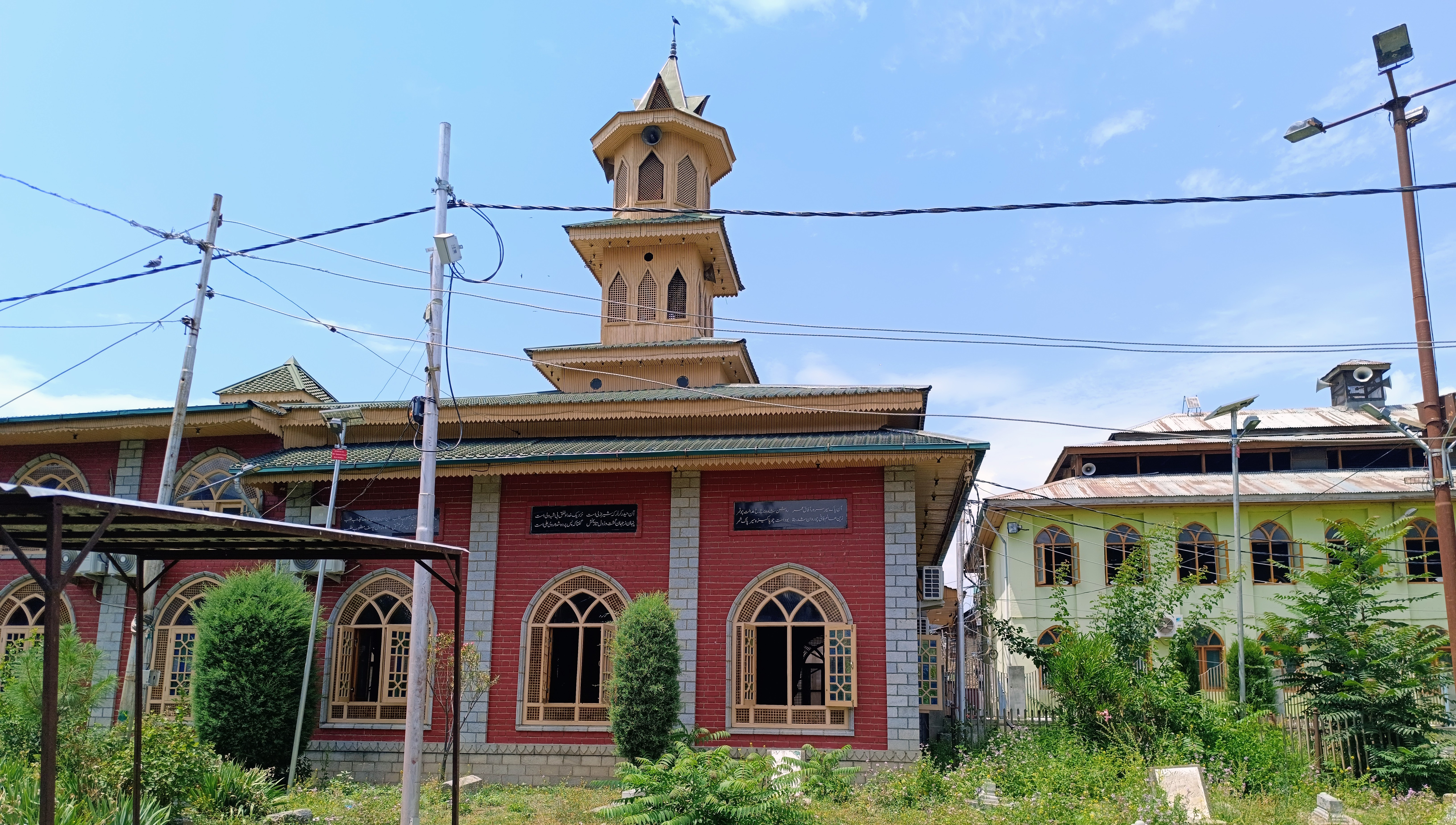
Shrine of Khawaja Habibullah Nowshehri (left) and Majid Hubbi (right)

- Shrine and mosque of Khawaja Habibullah Nowshehri
- Kashmir Law College

== Sources ==
- Hasan, Mohibbul (2005) [first published 1959], Kashmir Under the Sultans (Reprinted ed.), Delhi: Aakar Books, pp. 86–138, ISBN 978-81-87879-49-7
- Shah, Sayyid Ashraf (28 February 2022), Glory of Kashmir, Ashraf Fazili
- Sufi, G.M.D. (1979), Islamic Culture in Kashmir, Light & Life Publishers, ISBN 9788183390446
- Tikoo, P.N. (1979), Story of Kashmir, Light & Life Publishers
- Khoyihami, Hassan Shah (January 1960). Tazkirah Auliya-e-Kashmir: Tarikh-e-Hasan; Vol. 3 تذکرۂ اولیائے کشمیر (in Urdu). Srinagar, kashmir: Ghulam Mohammad Noor Muhammad Tajiran Kutub.
- Srivara (October 1994). Zaina Rajatarangini [Srivara's Zaina Rajatarangini]. Translated by Dhar, Kashi Nath. Indian Council of Historical Research and People's Publishing House. ISBN 81-7007-189-5.
- Jonaraja; Srivara; Bhatta, Prajna; Shuka (1990) [1898]. Kings of Kashmira. Vol. 3. Translated by Dutt, Jogesh Chunder. Mittal Publications.
- Lawrence, Walter R. (1895). The Valley of Kashmir. Oxford University Press Warehouse.
- Teng, Muhammad Yusuf, ed. (1986). Kashir Encyclopedia کٲشر انسائیکلوپیڈیا (in Kashmiri). Vol. 1. Srinagar: Jammu and Kashmir Academy of Art, Culture and Language.
