= Rainawari =

Locality in Jammu and Kashmir, India

- Locality
- Location in Jammu & Kashmir, India Rainawari (India)
- Coordinates: 34°05′52″N 74°49′22″E
- Country: India
- Union Territory: Jammu & Kashmir
- Division: Kashmir
- District: Srinagar
- Tehsil: Rainawari
- Founder: Abdal Raina
- Named for: Rajanakavatika (Garden of Rainas)

Government
  - Body: Government of Jammu and Kashmir

Population (2011)
  - Total: 3,896

Languages
  - Spoken: Kashmiri
- Time zone: UTC+5:30 (IST)
- Pincode: 190003

Rainawari (Urdu pronunciation: [rɛːnɑːʋɑːɾiː]; Kashmiri pronunciation: [rɨːnʲʋoːr]) is a locality in Srinagar, Kashmir, India.

== History ==
In the 14th century, the area of modern-day Rainawari was laid out by Abdal Raina, the son of Ravan Raina, who was the brother of the Queen of Kashmir, Kota Rani. He was also an ancestor of Hamza Makhdoom Raina. The area was known as "Rajanakavatika", which translates to "Garden of Rainas" in Sanskrit.

== Geography ==
Rainawari is located at 34.098°N 74.823°E. It is approximately 5 km (3.1 mi) north from Srinagar's district headquarters. The area is bounded by Badamwari and Khanyar from the west, Dalgate from the south and Dal Lake from the north and east.

== Notable places ==
- Vishwa Bharti Women's College

== See also ==
- Rajbagh
- Zadibal
- Dal Lake
- Khanyar
- Hawal
