= Khawaja Habibullah Nowshehri =

Kashmiri Sufi poet (c.1555–1617)

- خواجہ حبیب الله نوشہری

Personal life
- Born: c. 1555 (963 AH) Naushahr, Kashmir Sultanate (now Nowshera, Srinagar, Jammu and Kashmir)
- Died: c. 1617 (19 Dhu al-Hijjah 1027 AH) Naushahr, Mughal Kashmir (now Nowshera, Srinagar, Jammu and Kashmir)
- Resting place: Aastan Habibullah Nowshehri, Nowshera, Srinagar; 34°07′47″N 74°48′16″E
- Notable works: Rahat-ul-Quloon; Maqamat-e-Hazrat Ishan; Kuntu kanzan (naat)
- Pen name: Hubbi
- Occupation: Shopkeeper; Poet; Main interests: Naat, Poetry, Sufism

Religious life
- Religion: Islam
- Denomination: Sunni
- Tariqa: Kubrawiya

Muslim leader
- Influenced by: Shaykh Yaqub Sarfi

Khawaja Habibullah Ganai Nowshehri (Kashmiri: خواجہ حبیب الله گنائی نوشہری, c. 1555 – c. 1617), also known by his pen name Hubbi, was a Kashmiri Sufi mystic, poet, and religious scholar active during the late Chak and early Mughal periods in Kashmir Valley. He composed devotional poetry in Kashmiri and Persian, including na'at. His Aastan (shrine) is located in the Nowshera locality of Srinagar, where his annual urs is celebrated.

Hagiographical traditions associate Nowshehri with the Kubrawiya-Hamdani Sufi tradition and describe him as a disciple and one of the spiritual successors of Shaykh Yaqub Sarfi.

== Early life and education ==
Habibullah Nowshehri was born in the Nowshera, Srinagar, in 1555 CE (963 AH). His father, Shamsuddin Ganai, was reportedly a local salt merchant. Nowshehri's brother was Khawaja Yaqub.

According to Sufi hagiographical sources, Nowshehri memorized the Quran at an early age and would assist in his father's shop while continuing religious studies. He later studied under Mulla Hasan Afaqi, learning Persian and Arabic and studying Hadith and Fiqh. Later he became a disciple of Mir Muhammad Khalifa, under whom he continued his spiritual training. His later scholarly and spiritual development is historically linked to the circle of Yaqub Sarfi, and other Kashmiri scholars and Sufi masters.

According to Historical and hagiographical accounts, Mughal emperor Jahangir visited Nowshehri during one of his visits to Kashmir.

== Literary works ==
Nowshehri composed devotional poetry in Kashmiri and Persian literary traditions. He used the pen name Hubbi, under which his verses circulated in oral and manuscript traditions. Several works are attributed to him in manuscript collections and later literary surveys, including:

- Tanbhiy al-Quloob (The Admonition of the Hearts): Persian verses on Tasawwuf (Sufism) and Irfan (spiritual gnosis).
- Rahat al-Quloob (Comfort of Hearts).
- Mirat al-Gayoob (Mirror of Unseen).
- Risalat al-Insaf (Treatise of Justice): an Arabic treatise.
- Maqamat-i-Eishan (The stations of the Master): A Persian Biographical work in rhyming couplets documenting the life, travels, and spiritual lineage of his master, Shaykh Yaqub Sarfi. It was written in 1011 AH (1602 CE).
- Diwan-i-Hubbi: a collection containing Qasida, rubaiyat and qit'as.

Among these, the na'at commonly known by its refrain Kuntu Kanzan Avaye (or Yare gachav diwayae) is particularly well known in Kashmir.

== Death ==
Habibullah Nowshehri died on 19 Dhu'l-Hijja 1027AH (c. 1618 CE) or 1026 AH (c. 1617). (Note: Sufi Ghulam Muhyi-ud-Din, in Kashir, supported the date 1026 AH based on the chronogram Khwaja Habib-wal-Eishan. Although Tarikh-i-Hassan and Tarikh-i-Kabir recorded the year as 1027 AH, the chronogram reproduced in both works yields the date 1026 AH. Some historians also associated his death with the plague epidemic during the governorship of Ahmad Beg Khan (1024–1027 AH), rather than the later governorship of Dilawar Khan.) His death occurred during the bubonic and pneumonic plague epidemic that affected Kashmir between 1616 and 1618. (Note: Sufi hagiographical accounts describe that the local residents sought Nowshehri's help. According to these accounts, he advised them to remain patient through the night, and he later contracted the plague himself. Following his death, epidemic reportedly subsided.)

== Shrine complex ==
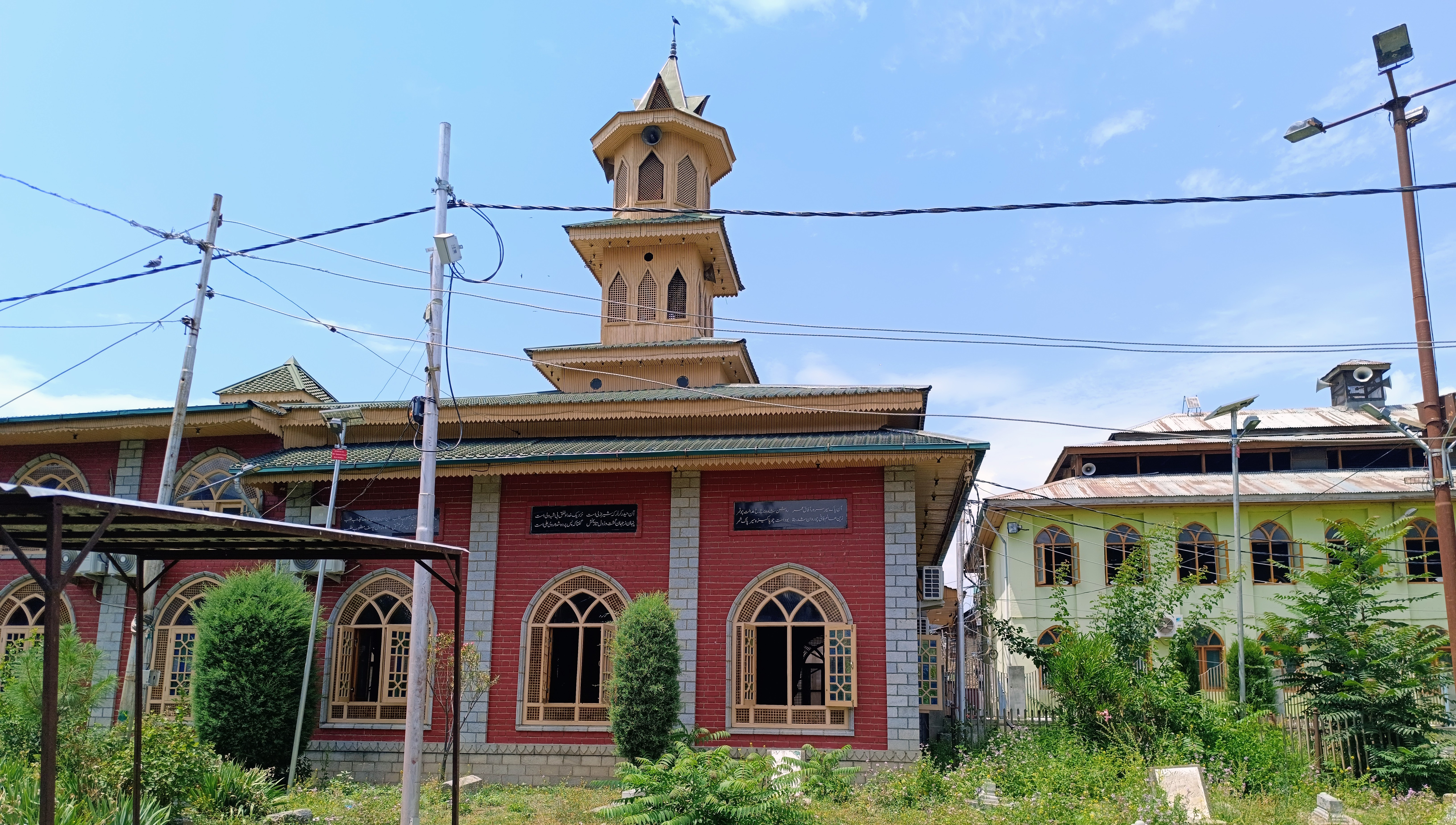
Shrine of Habibullah Nowshehri (left) and Masjid Hubbi (right)

Habibullah Nowshehri was buried in Nowshera, Srinagar, where his Aastan (shrine) remains a site of annual urs observances.

His shrine complex includes his tomb, Masjid Hubbi, a khanqah, and a graveyard.

=== Mosque and associated structures ===
According to the 1989 Kashir Encyclopedia, Masjid Hubbi was originally built on a carved stone base, with roof made of Himalayan birch wood. Due to its deteriorated condition, the mosque was dismantled and rebuilt in 1981 with funding from Nooruddin Bazaz, a prominent local benefactor. The reconstruction reportedly completed in two years.

A pond measuring approximately 28 square feet was formerly situated southwest of the mosque but no longer survives. A spring north of the shrine of the shrine, once known for its clear water, reportedly became polluted following a damage to a drainage channel. A khanqah on the western side of the shrine was built on carved stone and later repaired with a wooden-shingle roof. It housed a darasgah (religious school).

=== Shrine architecture ===
The Kashir Encyclopedia describes the Shrine as measuring approximately 35.5 feet in length and 36.75 feet in width. Its exterior features arched windows with intricate pinjrakari (latticework). The northern side has five windows, the eastern and southern sides have three each, while the western side has two windows and a doorway leading to the noorkhana.

The doorway has a carved frame decorated with floral motifs. The shrine's four-tiered wooden-shingle roof is covered with tin sheets and is topped by a pinnacle characteristic of Rishi-style architecture and a copper cupola. The shrine's entire ceiling is finished in khatamband, a traditional Kashmiri wood-panelling craft.

A wooden lattice enclosure, or zarih, surrounds the grave. Glass panes on the western side of the enclosure allow visitors to view the grave, which is covered in zarbaft brocade cloth. Eight other graves are marked by clay tiles in the south-eastern part of the surrounding corridor. A raised platform on the western side is traditionally identified as a place where Nowshehri sat. Graves of his relatives and descendants lie east of the shrine, while a graveyard extends to the south.

== Sources ==
- Kalla, Krishan Lal (1985), The Literary Heritage of Kashmir, Mittal Publications
- Khoyihami, Hassan Shah (January 1960). Tazkirah Auliya-e-Kashmir: Tarikh-e-Hasan; Vol. 3 تذکرۂ اولیائے کشمیر (in Urdu). Srinagar, kashmir: Ghulam Mohammad Noor Muhammad Tajiran Kutub. pp. 228–230.
- Didamari, Muhammed Azam (2019) [First published in Persian in 1747]. Waqiat-i-Kashmir (in Urdu). Translated by Ahmad, Shamsuddin. Srinagar: Jammu and Kashmir Islamic Research Center.
