= Walter Lawrence =

Walter Lawrence may refer to:

- Walter E. Lawrence (1905–1967), American politician
- Walter Lawrence (Australian politician) (1895–1966), member of the New South Wales Legislative Assembly
- Murray Lawrence (financier) (Walter Nicholas Murray Lawrence), English cricketer and financier
- Walter Lawrence Jr. (1935–2021), American surgical oncologist
- Walter Roper Lawrence (1857–1940), English author who served in the Indian Civil Service

== See also ==
- Walter St. Lawrence (c.1445–1504), Irish nobleman, lawyer and judge
- A. W. Lawrence (Arnold Walter Lawrence; 1900–1991), British authority on classical sculpture and architecture
- Walter Lawrance (1840–1914), priest in the Church of England
