= Baba Dawood Khaki =

16th-century Kashmiri Sufi scholar and poet

Baba Dawood Khaki (1521–1585 A.D) was a scholar, poet and Sufi of Kubrawiya order. He was a poet using pen name Khaki. Dawood served as Chief Justice of Kashmir during Shah Miri era.

== Life and career ==
Dawood Khaki was born in 1521 A.D in Kalashpora Srinagar to an affluent family. His father Khawaja Hassan Ganai enrolled him to study under Hafiz Mullah Baseer. After completing his formal education, he went to Mirza Afzal for further guidance. Here, Dawood learned Hadith from Shaykh Yaqub Sarfi even though they were classmates. Part of the reason being Yaqub Sarfi had studied Hadith from Ibn Hajar al-Haytami during his stay at Mecca.

Dawood Khaki being highly educated earned him fame in the court of Sultan Ali Shah, who tasked him to teach his sons. Sultan got impressed by his capabilities promoted him as Director of Education. Being an expert in Fiqh and Hadith, Dawood soon rose to the position of Qazi ul Quza (Chief Justice) of Kashmir. Dawood Khaki embraced Sufism after meeting Hamza Makhdoom and renounced his worldly affairs. He became staunch companion of Hamza Makhdoom and accompanied him to almost all places in Kashmir, since Hamza Makhdoom was always travelling due to his exile by Chak ruler of Kashmir.

== Death ==
Dawood Khaki along with Yaqub Sarfi, Bahram Nayak and Tahir Rafiq went to the court of Akbar in pursuit of help against Yaqub Chak. Upon returning, Dawood fell ill and passed away at Anantnag in 994 Hijri (1585 A.D). He was buried at Kohi Maran in Srinagar near the grave of his teacher Hamza Makhdoom.

== Works ==
- Virdul Murideen
- Qasidah Jalaiya
- Qasidat ul Ameer

== See also ==
- Shah Qasim Haqqani
- Nund Rishi
