= Hamza Makhdoom =

Kashmiri Sufi saint (1494–1576)

Shaykh Hamza Makhdoom
- حمزه مخدوٗم
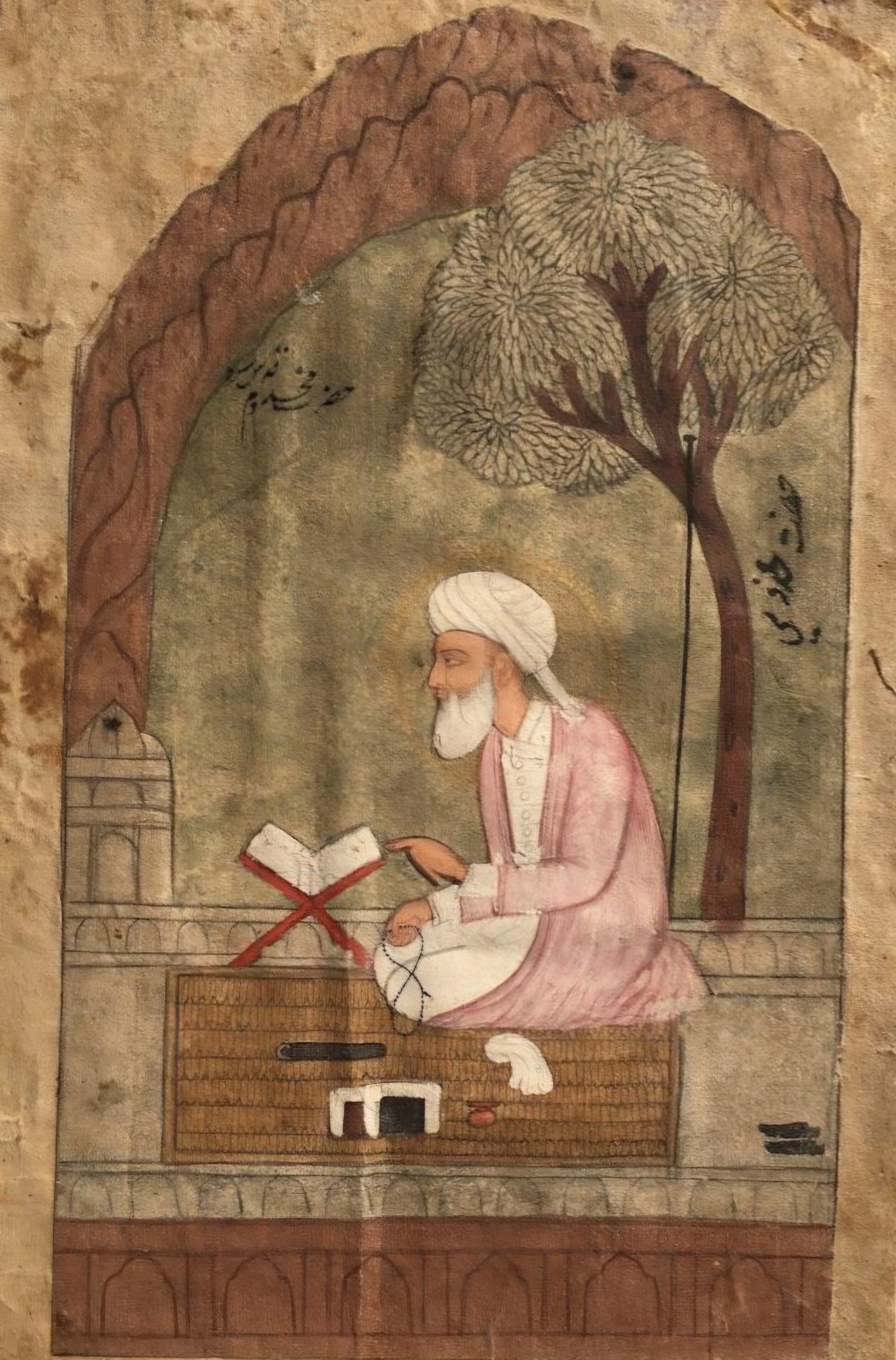
- 19th century portrait of Hamza Makhdoom in SPS Museum
- Title: Mehboob al-Alam (Beloved of the World); Sultan al-Arifeen (King of the Gnostics)

Personal life
- Born: Hamza Raina; 1494 AD (900 AH) Tujjar, Zaingir, Kashmir Sultanate (present-day Sopore, Baramulla district, Jammu and Kashmir)
- Died: 23 May 1576 (aged 81–82) (24 Safar 984 AH) Makhdoom Madaw (Kailashpora), Srinagar, Kashmir Sultanate
- Resting place: Makhdoom Sahib Shrine, Koh-i-Maran, Srinagar
- Parents: Usman Raina (father); Maryam (mother)
- Era: Shah Mir era Chak Era
- Education: Shamsi Chak seminary, Dar-ul-Shifa Madrasa

Religious life
- Religion: Islam
- Denomination: Sunni
- Tariqa: Suhrawardiyya

Muslim leader
- Students: Baba Dawood Khaki
- Influenced by: Mir Sayyid Ali Hamadani, Jahaniyan Jahangasht, Nund Rishi,

Hamza Raina Makhdoom (Note: حمزہ رینہ مخدوم) (c. 1494 – 23 May 1576 AD), was a Kashmiri Sufi saint, mystic, ascetic and religious scholar. Born into the Raina family of Tujjar in the Zainagir belt of the Kashmir Sultanate, he received his religious education in Srinagar and took bay'ah in Suhrawardiyya Sufi order before establishing himself as a spiritual teacher. He is also known by honorific titles Mehboob al-Alam ("beloved of the world") and Sultan al-Arifeen ("king of the gnostics"), and locally known as Makhdoom Sahib.

Hamza lived during the rule of the Chak dynasty and historical accounts describe tensions between him and the Shia Chak ruler Ghazi Shah Chak, after which he left Srinagar for a period. His principal disciple, Baba Dawood Khaki, became Chief Qazi of Kashmir and wrote works preserving traditions about him. Hamza's shrine at Koh-i-Maran in Srinagar is a prominent place of pilgrimage, where his annual urs is celebrated on 24 Safar.

== Early life ==
Hamza Raina was born around 1494 (900 AH) in Tujjar, in the Zainagir belt of the Kashmir Sultanate, in present-day Sopore, Baramulla district, Jammu and Kashmir. His father, Usman Raina, belonged to the Raina family, a lineage traditionally associated with the Chandravanshi rulers of Nagarkot. His mother was Bibi Maryam.

According to Tarikh-i-Hassan, Hamza showed an early interest in religious scholars and dervishes. The account also mentions a slight deformity of his foot, which did not prevent him from walking, working or riding horses.

As a child he attended a traditional elementary school (maktab). The same account states that his father once rebuked him for playing gulli-danda, a traditional game, and after an illness attributed to the incident, Hamza resolved never to play any games again and to devote himself more seriously to education. After recovering, he travelled to Srinagar with his grandfather, Zeeta Raina.

== Family Lineage ==
Traditional accounts trace Hamza Makhdoom's ancestry to the Chandravanshi (Lunar dynasty) rulers associated with Nagarkot, present-day Kangra. According to this tradition, Sosaram Chandra, son of ruler Malchandra, fled to Kashmir following a dispute with his brothers. There Raja Jayasimha granted him a Jagir (land grant) in Lar and appointed him to administrative and military positions. His descendants served under successive rulers of Kashmir.

During a Turkic-Mongol invasion of Kashmir under Zulju, King Suhadeva fled to Kishtwar, while his commander-in-chief Ramchandra, a descendent of Malchandra, remained. After the invading army was destroyed, Ramchandra assumed control of Kashmir. He was later killed during Rinchan's attack on Andarkot fort. Rinchan married Ramchandra's daughter, Kota Rani. Ramchandra's son, Rawān Chandra, converted to Islam under the influence of Bulbul Shah and received the title Raina from Rinchan. (Note: The title was associated with senior administrative positions.) His descendants continued to hold administrative and military positions under the Kashmiri sultans.

Among the later members of the family, Dawlat Raina served as vizier under Sultan Sikandar Shah, Ahmad Raina held the office of prime minister under Zayn al-Abidin, and Jahangir Raina administered state affairs under Hasan Shah before being killed by Malik Ahmad Yatu during a conflict involving the Bayhaqi Sayyids. Jahangir's son, Zeeta Raina, settled in Tujjar, a family jagir. His son, Usman Raina, was described as a learned and religiously inclined man associated with Baba Ismail Kubrawi (d. 1510), an ascetic and Shaykh al-Islām of Kashmir. Usman supported himself through landholding and agriculture and was Hamza Makhdoom's father.

The genealogy recorded in Baharistan-e-Shahi and discussed in Tarik-i-Hassan gives the following line of descent: Malchandra, Sosaram Chandra, Gahka Chandra, Balad Chadra, Sangram Chandra, Ram Chandra, Rawān Raina (brother of Kota Rani), Dawlat Raina, Abdāl Raina, Jahangir Raina, Zeeta Raina, Ahmad Raina, Usman Raina and Hamza Raina.

== Education and spiritual training ==
=== Religious education ===
In Srinagar, Hamza studied the Quran under Baba Fathullah, son of Baba Ismail Kubrawi and a spiritual guide (murshid) of the Raina family. He spent approximately a year at the Shamsi Chak Khanqah on Koh-i-Maran before continuing his education at the Dar-ul-Shifa madrasa established by Hassan Shah.

He reportedly studied at the institution for about twenty years. His studies included Islamic jurisprudence (fiqh), hadith, Quranic exegesis (tafsir), philosophy and ethics, alongside Sufi practices such as dhikr, devotional litanies (wazifa) and spiritual discipline. Scholars associated with his education include Maulana Dervish and Hafiz Arabi, and he studied fiqh under Maulana Lutfullah, a teacher at Dar-ul-Shifa.

=== Initiation into Suhrawardiyya ===
Hamza later took bay'ah (a pledge of allegiance in the Sufi tradition) under Sayyid Jamal al-Din Dehlavi Bukhari, a Sufi teacher associated with the Suhrawardiyya order. According to traditional accounts, Bukhari travelled from Delhi to Medina before arriving in Kashmir in 1526 (932 AH). Hamza reportedly received spiritual training from him for six months. Bukhari is said to have transmitted the teachings of his spiritual lineage (silsila), and appointed Hamza his successor (Khalifa) in the region, and granted him permission (ijazah) to teach it further.

== Religious career ==
After his studies and spiritual training, Hamza became a Sufi teacher and spiritual guide in Kashmir. In later tradition he came to be known by the titles Mehboob al-Alam and Sultan al-Arifeen. The historian Prithivi Nath Kaul Bamzai, in A History of Kashmir, describes him as a prominent saint who exercised considerable influence among the population of the Kashmir Valley.

Biographical accounts credit him with establishing mosques in various parts of the Valley during his travels, including those at Nadihal, Tujjar and Wuhangam in Beerwah.

=== Religious views and practices ===
Following the Suhrawardiyya tradition, Hamza is reported to have disapproved of sama (mystical Sufi music). One account states that while going to prayer, he heard sama and thereupon renewed his ablution (wudu).

According to Tarikh-i-Hassan, Hamza developed a routine of nocturnal worship during his years at the khanqah. He is said to have memorised Surah al-Kahf by listening to a dervish reciter during Tahajjud (night prayer) and to have memorized the Hirz-e-Yamani, a devotional prayer, after taking part in its recitation with a circle of shaykhs (halaqa), subsequently adopting it as a daily litany.

Although the Suhrawardiyyah was his principal tariqa, his disciple Dawood Khaki related that in later life Hamza followed practices of all Sufi orders and would perform dhikr aloud in the manner of Yassawiyya order of Ahmad Yasawi.

== Hagiographical accounts ==
Traditional hagiographical accounts describe extraordinary experiences attributed to Hamza, including extended breath control, such as spending a night in dikhr on a single breath. Dawood Khaki wrote that Hamza had attained the station of an Abdāl in the hierarchy of saints in Sufi hagiography.

Other narrative describe experiences that Hamza interpreted as guidance or warnings from the unseen world (Ālam al-Ghayb), including nocturnal admonitions when he neglected his devotional practices, and what he regarded as supernatural assistance in recalling forgotten lessons.

One account relates that a Shia scholar tried to persuade Hamza to abandon Sunni practice and embrace Shia Islam. Unsettled, Hamza reportedly withdrew to Zakir mosque on Koh-i-Maran and abstained from food. On the third night, he is said to have dreamed that the Islamic Prophet Muhammad and the four caliphs told him he was on the right path, directing him back to Sunni belief.

== Relation with ruling authorities ==
Hamza lived during a period of political and religious change in Kashmir, including the rule of the Chak dynasty. According to Bamzai, the Shia ruler Ghazi Shah Chak forced Hamza to leave Srinagar, and he settled in the village of Ahmah, in the Beerwah region for a period, where he attracted a following. Other Sufi figures were also reportedly exiled by royal order during this period, but their continued preaching and the following they attracted contributed to a broader religious movement that challenged Chak authority, prompting the rulers to adopt a more conciliatory attitude towards Sufi leaders and religious scholars.

A further hagiographical narrative states that, the Ghazi Shah later developed Leprosy and sent an envoy to request Hamza's prayers for his recovery. Hamza is said to have refused to return while the ruler remained in power. Ghazi Shah died before Hamza returned to the city.

Bamzai also associates Hamza with opposition to Chak administration, stating that he supported the mission of his disciple Baba Dawood Khaki and the scholar Yaqub Sarfi to the Mughal emperor Akbar, seeking annexation of Kashmir to the Mughal Empire.

== Personal life ==
Traditional accounts state that Hamza never married and had no biological children. His brother was Baba Ali Raina. Hamza reportedly adopted a son named Mohammad Ali.

== Death ==
Hamza died on 23 May 1576 AD (24 Safar 984 AH) at Makhdoom Mandaw (Kailashpora) in Srinagar, aged about 82, (Note: Sources give his age as 84 years according to the Islamic lunar calendar.) after being unwell and bedridden for about a week. Muhammad Tahir performed the ritual washing (ghusl) of his body and led the funeral prayer. The procession ascended from Eidgah to Koh-i-Maran (Hari Parbat), where he was buried on the hill's southern slope, a place where he had spent time in devotion and meditation. The funeral was reportedly attended by the ruler Ali Shah Chak, whom Bamzai describes as "holding the Sunni saint Hamza Makhdoom in great respect."

== Shrine ==
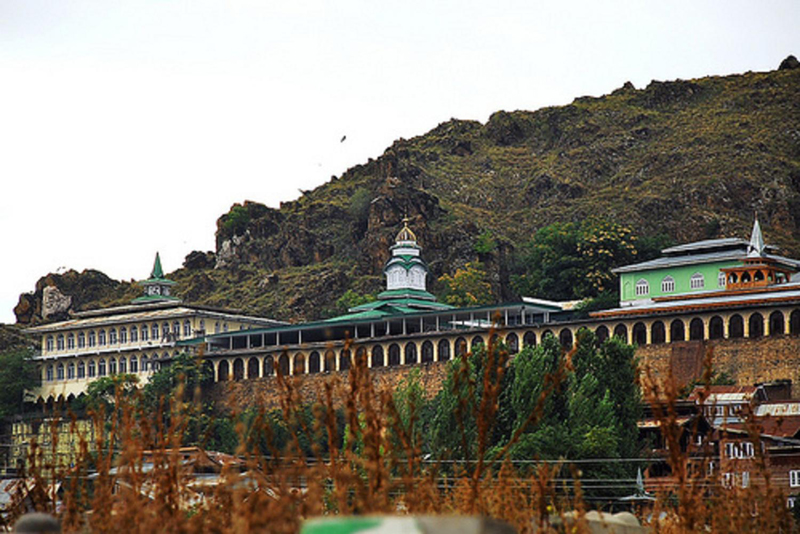
South-eastern view of the Ziyarat Makhdoom Sahib shrine on Koh-i-Maran, Srinagar

Devotees ascending the Koh-i-Maran hill toward the Shrine of Hamza Makhdoom in July 1899 (during the urs days)

Hamza Makhdoom is buried at the Makhdoom Sahib Shrine, also known as Ziyarat Makhdoom Sahib , a mausoleum complex on the south-western slope of Koh-i-Maran in Srinagar. The complex also contains the grave of his disciple Dawood Khaki, as well as several mosques and other structures. It is regarded as one of the six principal shrines of Srinagar.

The Mughal emperor Akbar commissioned the construction of a tomb over Hamza's grave, approximately fourteen years after his death. It was reconstructed during the Afghan rule around 1821 under the governor Atta Mohammad Khan. The shrine complex went under further expansion and restoration under successive Mughal, Afghan and Sikh administrations

An annual urs (death anniversary) is held on 24 Safar, and attracts devotees from across Kashmir and beyond.

=== Rain-seeking procession ===
Historically, during natural calamities, people in Kashmir organised special prayer processions at the Eidgah and at the shrines of saints including Hamza Makhdoom's shrine. Participants from across the Valley carried earthen pitchers and pails filled with water and poured it into the pond near the shrine.

== Legacy ==
=== Disciples ===
Hamza's principal disciple was Baba Dawood Khaki (d. 1587), a jurist, poet and later Chief Qazi of Kashmir. Khaki composed Wird al-Muridīn, a work that preserves traditions concerning Hamza's teachings, devotional practices and spiritual standing. He is also attributed with Dastur al-Salikīn, a work summarising aspects of the Sufi path, and with the Qasida-i-Jalaliyya. Although a devote disciple of Hamza, Khaki deferred from him on certain Sufi practices. He supported sama (mystical Sufi music) under prescribed conditions, whereas Hamza opposed it. Khaki also emphasized silent remembrance of God (dhikr-i-Khafi) over vocal remembrance (dhikr-i-jahr), but stressed the importance of obedience to a spiritual guide (murshid).

Other disciples included Shams-ud-Din Pal, a scholar known for his spiritual connection with Hamza, who later travelled to Mecca and is reported to have been buried in Al-Baqi Cemetery, Medina; Mulla Ahmad Chagli, a Kashmiri scholar associated with his khanqah; Mir Haidar Tulmuli, who promoted Hamza's teachings. Baba Naseeb ud-Din Gazi, Mir Mohammad Afzal, Bayezid Shumnagi, Feroz Ganai, Ishaq Qari, Hassan Qari and Mohammad Ali Raina, who carried his teachings into different regions of Kashmir.

Miram bazaz, a lesser-known disciple and Turkic merchant who settled in Srinagar, wrote Tazkara-i-Murshidin, a short collection of sketches of noted saints. He is also credited with endowing land to Muslim burials in Malkha Cemetery following a spiritual vision involving Hamza.

=== Birch-bark document ===
A birch-bark document identified as a Wasiqa Nameh or Wasiyat Nameh, preserved in the SPS Museum in Srinagar, is related to Hamza Makhdoom. Written on a single birch bark in Persian and Sharada scripts, it bears the signatures of several of his disciples, including Hasan Qari, Mulla Hussain, as well as several seals. The document is dated 984 AH. It records the transfer of Hamza's property and belongings to his younger brother, Ali Raina, who is identified as the author of Tazkirat-ul-Arifeen. Raina's signature also appears on the document.

=== Coins bearing his name ===
Coins bearing references to Hamza and Nund Rishi were issued during the Durrani period. Dated 1223–1228 AH (1808–1813 CE), they are attributed to Atta Muhammad Khan. The coins bear Persian inscriptions, including the title Makhdoom Qutb al-Arifeen, and copper issues carry the legend "Ya Sheikh Makhdoom Jehan." Their reverse features a floral design, the mint designation Zarb-i-Kashmir and the date.

W.R. Rodgers documented these coins in his Catalogue of the Coins in the Punjab Museum, Lahore. Examples are preserved in the collections of SPS Museum in Srinagar.

== See also ==
- Nund Rishi
- Habibullah Nowshehri

== Sources ==
- Khoyihami, Ghulam Hassan (1960). Tarikh-i-Hassan: Tazkira-e-Awliya-e-Kashmir تاریخ حسن: تذکرۂ اولیاۓ کشمیر (in Urdu). In handwriting of Qazi Mohammad Hussain. MaharajGanj Srinagar: Ghulam Mohd. Noor Mohd. Tajraan-e-Kutub. pp. 159–172.
- Didamari, Muhammed Azam (2019). Waqiat-e-Kashmir واقعات کشمیر [Events of Kashmir] (in Urdu). Translated by Shams-ud-Din, Ahmad. from original Persian (1747) (5th ed.). Srinagar: Jammu and Kashmir Islamic Research Centre. pp. 167–169, 750–756. ISBN 81-8304-000-4.
- Bamzai, Prithivi Nath Kaul (1962). A History of Kashmir (PDF). Delhi: Metropolitan Book Co. Private Ltd.
- Rafiqi, Abdul Qaiyum (1972). Sufism in Kashmir from the Fourteenth to the Sixteenth Century. Bharatiya Publishing House. ISBN 9780958168106.
- Teng, Muhammad Yusuf, ed. (1986). Kashir Encyclopedia کٲشر انسائیکلوپیڈیا (in Kashmiri). Vol. 1. Srinagar: Jammu and Kashmir Academy of Art, Culture and Language.
- Sheikh, Bashir Ahmad (2012). The Impact of Sufism on Socio-economic and Cultural Conditions of the Jammu and Kashmir (16th–18th C.). Under the supervision of Dr. S. Liyaqat Hussain Moini. Aligarh U.P.: Centre of Advanced Study Department of History Aligarh Muslim University.
- Sufi, G.M.D. (1974). Kashir: A History of Kashmir. Light & Life Publishers.
