= Murray Lawrence =

Murray Lawrence may refer to:

- Murray Lawrence (rower)
- Murray Lawrence (financier)
