= Sultan-ul-Arifeen =

Sultan-ul-Arifeen is an Arabic word/title which literally means "the king among those who have Knowledge (of God)" (that is, metaphorically, "the first among the Wise") and may refer to:

- Bayazid Bastami (804–874), Persian Sufi mystic, born in Bastam, Greater Iran
- Hamza Makhdoom (1494–1576), Sufi mystic, scholar and spiritual teacher living in Kashmir
- Sultan Bahoo (1630–1691), Sufi mystic, poet and scholar living in Punjab, founder of the Sarwari Qadiri tradition
