= Raina (surname) =

Kashmiri surname

Raina is a surname found in Jammu and Kashmir , Punjab , Himachal Pradesh and Haryana. The people with this surname predominantly live in Jammu and Kashmir as well as diasporic communities across India.

== People with the name ==
- A. K. Raina
- Ankita Raina
- Aparna Raina
- Dhruv Raina
- Gargi Raina
- Hamza Raina Makhdoom
- Jasbir Singh Raina
- Jasmeet Raina
- K. K. Raina
- Marco Raina
- M. K. Raina
- Mohit Raina
- Priya Raina
- Ravinder Raina
- Robin Raina
- Samay Raina
- Suresh Raina
- Suryansh Raina
- Taaruk Raina
- Tapishwar Narain Raina
- Tochi Raina
- Vedang Raina
- Vijay Kumar Raina
- Vineet Raina
- Vinod Raina
