= Buchpora =

Buchpora Batshpur
- Town
- Interactive map of Buchpora
- Coordinates: 34°9′1.25″N 74°48′12.92″E
- Country: India
- Union territory: Jammu and Kashmir
- District: Srinagar

Languages
  - Official: Kashmiri, Dogri, Urdu, Hindi, English
- Time zone: UTC+5:30 (IST)
- PIN: 190020

Buchpora (Urdu pronunciation: [bət͡ʃʰpoːɾɑː] ; Kashmiri pronunciation: [bat͡sʰpuːr]) is a town on the outskirts of Srinagar, Jammu and Kashmir, India. It is situated on Srinagar-Leh Highway on the eastern side of Anchar Lake. The postal code of the area is 190020. The area is about 12.1 km (7.5 mi) north from Lal Chowk. Most of the current inhabitants of the area are migrants from Downtown Srinagar. During the project of widening the roads in Downtown, numerous houses obstructing the widening of roads were shattered down. The affected people were given plots of land by state government in neighbouring areas including Buchpora and Soura. Thus many government housing colonies were constructed in these areas. The famous Anchar lake also shares its banks with Buchpora in the Hajibagh Colony. Adjacent to Hajibagh is posh Firdous Colony. There are many areas adjacent to this area as well notable of them Illahi bagh, Rangpora, Umerhair, are some of them. The area was an agriculture land but has now been converted into a residential area. The area falls under jurisdiction of Soura police station and is only 2 km from Kashmir's biggest tertiary hospital SKIMS.

The area provides two major road links which connect Ganderbal with Srinagar.

== Schools ==
The schools providing education facilities to local students as well as the students from other districts are as follows :

- Green Valley Educational Institute
- Saint Solomon High School
- Standard Public High School, Upper Soura
- Snow Land Public School
- Zulfikar Memorial Educational Institute
- Usmania Model High School
- Oasis Preparatory School

== See also ==
- 90 Feet Road
- Soura
