= Kashmir Law College =

Law college in Jammu and Kashmir

- Type: Private Law College
- Established: 2005
- Affiliations: University of Kashmir
- Chairman: Altaf Bazaz
- Location: Tawheed Abad, Nowshera, Srinagar, Jammu and Kashmir, India; 34.1315°N 74.8088°E
- Website: https://kashmirlawcollege.edu.in

Kashmir Law College or KLC is a private law school situated at Tawheed Abad, Nowshera, Srinagar in the Indian union territory of Jammu and Kashmir. It offers undergraduate 3 years law courses, 5 Year Integrated B.A. LL.B. courses is approved by Bar Council of India (BCI), New Delhi and affiliated to University of Kashmir.
