= Green Valley Educational Institute =

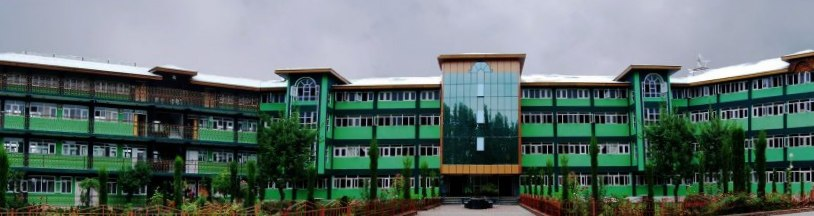
- Main academic building of Green Valley Educational Institute

Location
- Ellahi Bagh, Buchpora; Srinagar, Jammu & Kashmir, 190020; India; 34.1566°N 74.8161°E

Information
- Type: School
- Motto: Virtue & Conoscenza (Virtue & Knowledge)
- Established: 1990
- Founder: Mohammad Yousuf Wani
- School board: CBSE
- Chairperson: Mohammad Yousuf Wani
- Principal: Riyaz Ahmad Kajoo
- Teaching staff: 200
- Grades: 1st to 12th
- Classes: 120
- Average class size: 55 m^{2} (590 ft^{2})
- Student to teacher ratio: 1:36
- Language: English, Urdu
- Classrooms: 120
- Campus size: 10,398 m^{2} (111,920 ft^{2})
- Campus type: urban
- Color: Green
- Nickname: GVEI (gveians)
- Publication: Evergreen magazine
- Affiliation: CBSE
- Website: https://gveisrinagar.com

Green Valley Educational Institute (GVEI) (Note: Urdu and Kashmiri: گرین ویلی ایجوکیشنل انسٹی ٹیوٹ) is a private, co-educational school located in the Ellahi Bagh, Buchpora, Srinagar, Jammu and Kashmir, India. Established in 1990, the institution provides education from kindergarten level to class 12 and is affiliated with Central Board of Secondary Education (CBSE).

== History ==
The school was founded in 1990 by Mohammad Yousuf Wani during a period marked by educational and infrastructural challenges in Jammu and Kashmir.

Initially, GVEI was affiliated with the Jammu and Kashmir Board of School Education (JKBOSE) and followed its curriculum for secondary and senior secondary education. In 2024, the school shifted its affiliation to the Central Board of Secondary Education (CBSE), gradually aligning its curriculum for Classes 10, 11, and 12 to CBSE standards. Today, GVEI offers education from Nursery through Class 12 under the CBSE framework.

== Academic Structure ==
GVEI follows a K-12 curriculum with instruction offered in English and Urdu. It operates as a co-educational institution, maintaining separate classrooms for boys and girls up to Class 10. At the senior secondary level, students may opt for one of four academic streams including Medical, Non-Medical, Commerce, and Humanities. The curriculum includes subjects such as English, Mathematics, Physics, Chemistry, Biotechnology, Computer Science, and Information Technology.

== Facilities ==
According to the official website of Green Valley Educational Institute, the total campus area of the school is 10,398 m^{2} (111,920 ft^{2}) and includes facilities for academic and extracurricular activities. The school maintains a well-stocked library. It also houses an Atal Tinkering Lab, which provides hands-on learning in opportunities in robotics, engineering, and other STEM fields. Additional facilities include a swimming pool and sports infrastructure.

In August 2025, the school inaugurated a new state-of-the-art auditorium, to host cultural programs, seminars, and academic events.

== Publications ==
GVEI publishes a school magazine titled The Evergreen, which includes articles, news, and information related to the school community. The magazine features contributions from both students and staff and is produced in English, Urdu, and Kashmiri. The second edition of The Evergreen was released in August 2018.

== Sports and Extracurricular Activities ==
The school supports a range of extracurricular activities. Its football club, Green Valley FC, competes in the B Division of the Jammu and Kashmir Football League. Students also participate in other sports and cultural programmes.

In October 2025, GVEI served as one of the venues for the 69th National School Games U-19 Boys Football Tournament, organized by the Youth Services and Sports Department, with teams from across India competing at the school’s facilities.

== See also ==
- List of schools in Jammu and Kashmir
