= Awanta Bhawan =

Place in Srinagar, Jammu and Kashmir

Wontabhawan Awanta Bhawan
- Owanta Bhawan
- Interactive map of Wontabhawan
- Coordinates: 34.139012°N 74.810412°E
- Country: India
- Union territory: Jammu and Kashmir
- District: Srinagar
- Settled: Ancient
- Founded by: Rani Amritaprabha
- Elevation: 1,592 m (5,223 ft)
- Time zone: UTC+5:30 (IST)
- PIN: 190011
- Telephone code: 0194
- Vehicle registration: JK 01

Awanta Bhawan, also spelled as Wontabhawan or Owanta Bhawan, is a historic locality adjacent to the Soura area of Srinagar, in the Indian union territory of Jammu and Kashmir. The area is associated with traditional water channels, historic religious sites, and old residential settlements in northern Srinagar, with historical associations with Rani Amritaprabha.

== History ==
According to historical sources, most notably Kalhana's 12th-century chronicle Rajatarangini, the ancient name of Awantabhawan was Amritabhavana. Local tradition and historical texts associate the founding of the settlement with Queen Amritaprabha, the consort of King Meghavahana, who ruled Kashmir during the Gonandiya dynasty. The chronicle notes that Queen Amritaprabha established a grand Vihara (Buddhist monastery) at the site for the benefit of visiting foreign monks. The 8th-century Chinese Buddhist traveller Ou-k'ong mentions the monastery by the name Ngo-mi-t'o-po-wan.

Over centuries, the classical Sanskrit name Amritabhavana phonetically evolved through local linguistic shifts into Antabhawan, eventually becoming the modern toponym Awanta Bhawan. The area historically contained interconnected water channels and ponds that supported domestic use and irrigation in surrounding neighbourhoods.

The area lies near Vicharnag, and old cultural and religious zone of Srinagar containing ancient springs and Hindu temple.

== Heritage and Environment ==
According to regional media reports, a historic water channel flowing through the locality has been affected by encroachment, solid waste dumping, and environmental degradation. Local residents have raised concerns regarding the structural degradation of an ancient bridge-like structure situated over the stream, calling for immediate conservation and restoration efforts from municipal authorities.

== Geography ==
Awanta bhawan is situated in the northern periphery of Srinagar. The area is bounded by Soura to the west, Nowshera to the south, and Lal Bazar to the east. The 90 Feet Road, a part of National Highway 1, runs along the outer edge of the neighbourhood.
