= Soura, Srinagar =

Soura Sovur
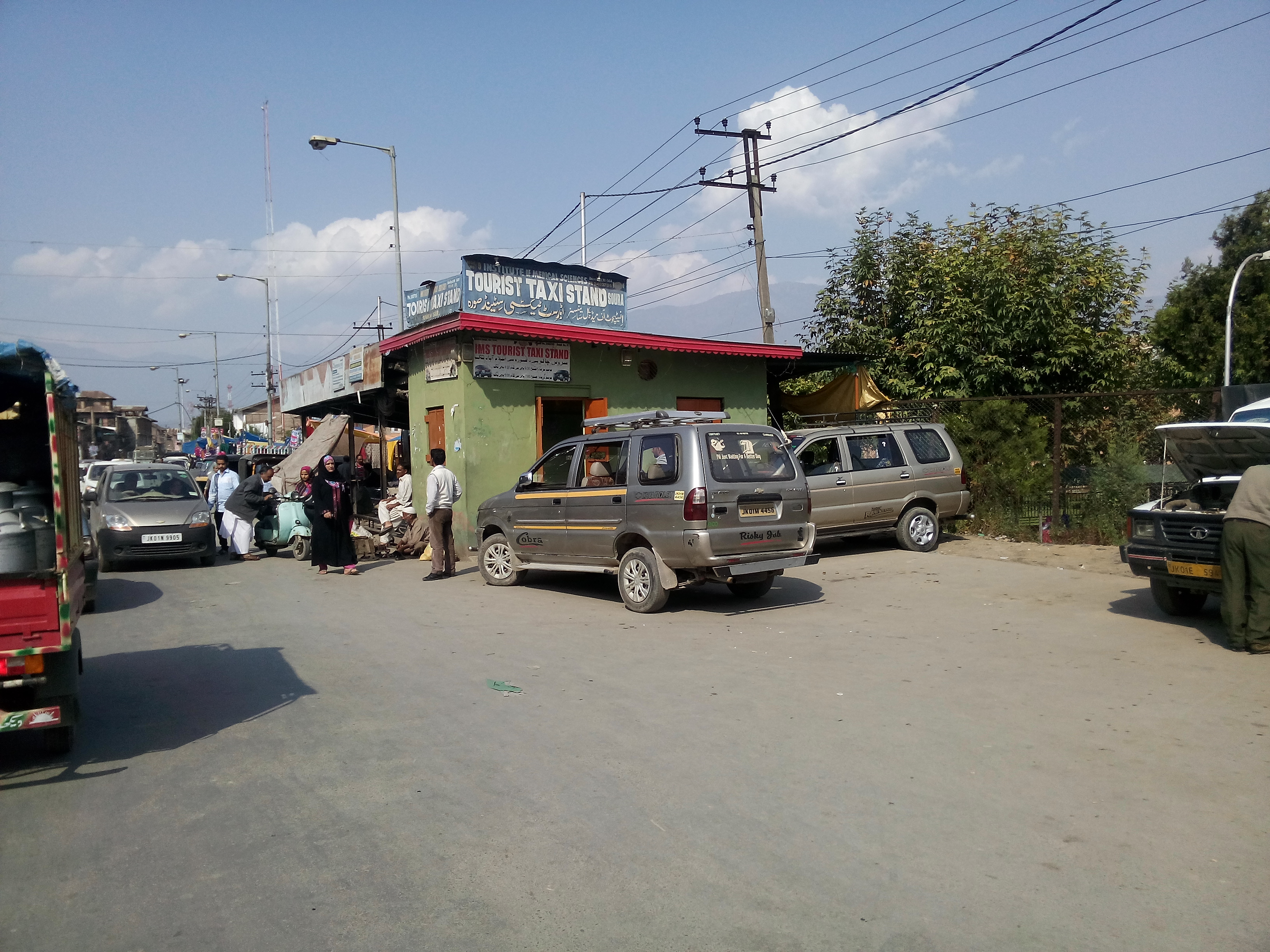
- Interactive map of Soura
- Coordinates: 34.137833°N 74.802109°E
- Country: India
- Union territory: Jammu and Kashmir
- District: Srinagar
- Settled: Ancient
- Elevation: 1,592 m (5,223 ft)

Languages
  - Official: Kashmiri, Urdu, Hindi, Dogri, English
- Time zone: UTC+5:30 (IST)
- PIN: 190011
- Telephone code: 0194
- Vehicle registration: JK 01
- Distance from Delhi: 858.9 kilometres (533.7 mi)
- Distance from Mumbai: 2,206.7 kilometres (1,371.2 mi)

Soura, (Note: Urdu pronunciation: [sɔːɾɑː]) also known in Kashmiri as Sovur, (Note: Kashmiri pronunciation: [soʋur]) is a neighbourhood in Srinagar Indian-administered union territory of Jammu and Kashmir in the disputed Kashmir region. It is located east of Anchar Lake, near the southern end of 90 ft Road (a 7 km long segment of National Highway 1). Soura is home to the Sher-e-Kashmir Institute of Medical Sciences (SKIMS), a multi-specialty hospital, which also serves as a medical deemed university of the Kashmir Valley.

== Geography ==
Soura lies in the northern part of Srinagar and is bounded by Buchpora to the north, Anchar Lake to the west, Nowshera to the south, and 90 ft road before Awanta Bhawan to the east.

== Landmarks ==
- Sher-e-Kashmir Institute of Medical Sciences (SKIMS), a tertiary-care hospital, medical university, and research institution.
- Maternity Hospital SKIMS, a maternity facility associated with SKIMS.
- Jenab Sahib Anchar, a Muslim shrine that houses a collection of Islamic relics.
- Sabzi Mandi

== See also ==
- Zadibal
- Lalbazar
