= Vichar Nag =

Spring and Hindu Temple in Srinagar, Jammu and Kashmir

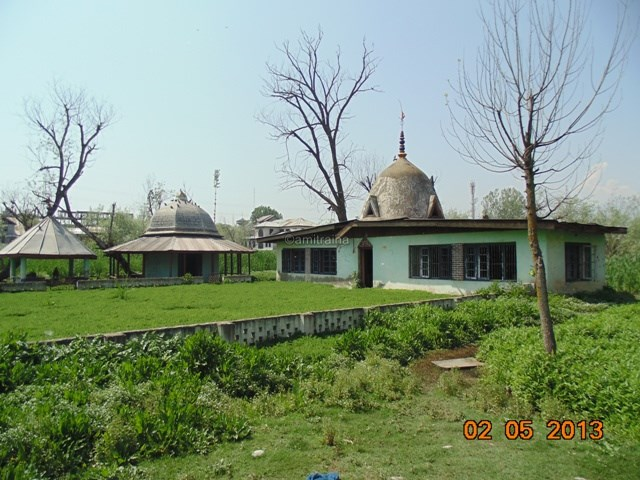
- Vichar Nag temple in 2013 (before restoration)

Religion
- Affiliation: Hinduism
- District: Srinagar
- Deity: Shiva
- Rite: Kashmir Shaivism
- Status: Hindu Temple and spring

Location
- Location: Vicharnag, Nowshera, Srinagar
- Country: India
- Interactive map of Vichar Nag
- Territory: Jammu and Kashmir
- Coordinates: 34.1344°N 74.8055°E

Vichar Nag (Note: Urdu pronunciation: [ʋɪt͡ʃɑːrnɑːɡ] ; Kashmiri pronunciation: [ʋʲat͡saːrnaːɡ]) is an ancient spring and Shiva Hindu temple in Srinagar, in the Indian union territory of Jammu and Kashmir. It is situated in the east of Anchar Lake and has historically been associated with religious activity, pilgrimage, and learning. Vichar Nag is mentioned several times in the history of Kashmir, including the famous Rajatarangini by Kalhana.

== Early historical references ==
The area is mentioned in medieval Kashmiri chronicles and pilgrimage records, often mentioned together with nearby Awanta Bhawan (Amritabhavana), historically associated with ancient Buddhist Vihara.

Stein in his commentary and translation of Kalhana's Rajatarangini, described Vichar Nag as a village surrounded by walnut groves and noted the presence of a spring that formed the focus of pilgrimage during the month of Chaitra. He also referred to an earlier name for the locality, Muktamulaka Naga, attested in the works of Shrivara.

== Religious significance ==
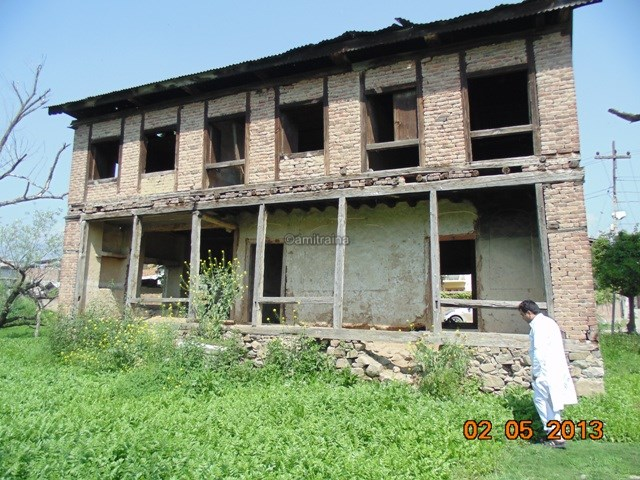
Dharamshala in ruins in 2013

Local traditions hold that Vichar Nag served as centre of religious discussion among Kashmiri Pandits, hence the name Vichar Nag is said to have derived from Sanskrit and Kashmiri word Vichār (discussion) and Nāg (spring). The temple served as a seat where Kashmiri Brahmins used to discuss Panchang. Adi Shankara is reported to have visited this temple for discussion.

Some traditions identify Vichar Nag as a possible location connected with the Fourth Buddhist Council (Kashmiri Sarvāstivāda Council) convened under the Kushan emperor Kanishka (r. 127–150 CE), although historians differ regarding the exact site of the council.

Before 1990, on Chaitra Amavasya, the final day of the traditional Kashmiri calendar, devotees visited the temple, dipped in the spring and performed rituals at the temple known as ‘Vichar Saheb’.

== Architectural features ==
The Vichar nag temple complex consists of two historic Shiva temples, among which one temple is made of chiselled and dressed devri stones. Among the two springs, the large central one remains the primary ritual feature of the site. The spring has a length of 430 feet and breadth of 35 feet. In the centre of the spring lies the Lingam on stone cylinder of about 3 feet height. The spring's water emerged as a small brook that joined a stream known as the Mukhta Pukhri. After flowing for a considerable distance, the water historically emptied into Anchar Lake.

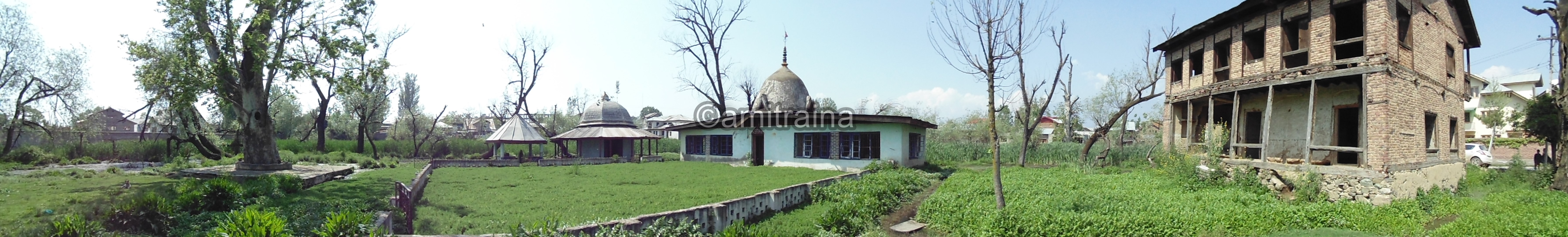
Panoramic Shot of the Vichar Nag Temple in 2013 (before restoration)

== Contemporary history ==
Following the Exodus of Kashmiri Hindus, the temple complex fell into a state of neglect and partial disrepair.

However, the Temple witnessed renewed religious activity in recent years. Festivals including Navaratri and Navreh have continued to be observed at the site by devotees and members of the Kashmiri Pandit community.

=== 2025-26 restoration ===
Entrance gate of Vichar Nag after 2026 restoration

In recent years, the Government of Jammu and Kashmir has initiated restoration and conservation works at the site under heritage preservation programmes. In 2025, government officials visited the temple complex to review ongoing conservation efforts. The project at an initial cost of ₹4.58 crore, implemented by the Roads and Buildings Department, included the restoration of the temple structures, desilting of water channels connected to Gilsar Lake, construction of visitor facilities, earth filling around the temple, and the construction of an entrance gate and a toilet block. Landscape works using traditional materials such as lime mortar and timber.

In July 2026, a prana pratishtha ceremony was held in Vichar Nag Temple upon the completion of its restoration project.
