= Shah Qasim Haqqani =

Sayyid Shah Qasim Haqqani (born 958 Hijri era, 1551 A.D) was a 16th-century Sufi, Poet and Scholar in Kashmir. He was descendent of Syed Shams ud Din Shami who came to Kashmir with Mir Sayyid Ali Hamadani. Shah Qasim was trained in Kubrawiya order by his teacher Shaykh Yaqub Sarfi Kashmiri. He was also acquainted in other Sufi traditions such as Qadriya and Naqshbandi Order.

Shah Qasim Haqqani died on 29 Rabi us Sani 1033 Hijri (1624 A.D) and was buried at Fateh Kadal Srinagar.

== Works ==
- Taj ul Arifeen (A commentary on Awrad i Fatiha)
- Diwan i Qasim Haqqani (A collection of Persian Poetry)

== See also ==
- Hamza Makhdoom
- Shaykh Yaqub Sarfi Kashmiri
- Nund Rishi
