= The Valley of Kashmir =

Book by Sir Walter Roper Lawrence (1895)

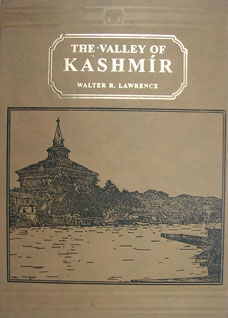
- Reprint London edition 1895
- Author: Sir Walter Roper Lawrence
- Language: English
- Genre: travel book
- Publisher: H. Frowde
- Publication date: 1895
- Publication place: United Kingdom
- Media type: Print (Hardcover)
- Pages: 478
- ISBN: 978-812061630-1

The Valley of Kashmir (1895) is a book on Kashmir by the English writer Sir Walter Roper Lawrence. The author served in the Indian Civil Service in British India during which he was appointed as a Settlement Commissioner of Kashmir.

The Valley of Kashmir is the summary of Lawrence's visit to Kashmir. He travelled to almost every corner of the Valley and developed a close affinity with the people who figure prominently in the work. The book describes the geography, culture in brief and the hardships faced by the Kashmiri people under the rule of Dogras. The book was first published in 1895 by H. Frowde in London.
