= Mirza Kamil Badakhshi =

17th-century Kashmiri Sufi poet and writer

- میرزا اکمل‌الدین محمد بیگ خان بدخشی

Personal life
- Born: c. 1644 CE (1054 AH) Kashmir Valley, Mughal Kashmir (now Jammu and Kashmir)
- Died: 1718 Srinagar, Mughal Kashmir (now Jammu and Kashmir)
- Resting place: Hawal, Srinagar; 34°06′43″N 74°48′35″E
- Notable works: Bahr al-'Irfan; Mukhbir al-Asrar

Religious life
- Religion: Islam
- Tariqa: Kubrawiya, Qadiriyya, Suhrawardiyya

Muslim leader
- Influenced by: Rumi, Attar of Nishapur

Mirza Akmal-ud-Din Muhammad Kamil Beigh Khan Badakhshi (Note: Persian: میرزا اکمل‌الدین محمد بیگ خان بدخشی) (c. 1644 – 1718), commonly known as Mirza Kamil was a Kashmiri Sufi poet, scholar, and mystic of Turkic-Central Asian ancestry. He was associated with several Sufi orders. He is best known for his Persian work Bahr al-'Irfan (Ocean of Gnosis), a Masnavi reportedly consisting of approximately 80,000 couplets, devoted to Sufi metaphysics and spiritual instruction.

Mirza Kamil was a figure in the development of Sufi thought and devotional culture in the Kashmir Valley during the Mughal period. His shrine, located in the Hawal area of Srinagar, remains a site of his annual urs (death anniversary) commemoration.

== Birth and background ==
Mirza Akmal al-Din Muhammad was born in Kashmir in 1644 CE (1054 AH), into the Badakhshi family of Central Asian origin. According to Hagiographical accounts, his grandfather, Muhammad Quli Khan Badakhshi, migrated from Tashkent to India during the reign of Mughal emperor Akbar. Various historical sources describe him as serving in the Mughal administration and holding official positions in the Mughal Kashmir. The family subsequently settled in the Kashmir Valley. His father was Mirza Adil Beigh. Some sources trace the family's lineage to Ahmad Yasawi, while others link it to Abu Hanifa.

Hagiographical accounts state that Shah Jahan gave him the title Kamil, granted him a Jagir, and raised him under imperial patronage.

== Education ==
Traditional biographies record that Kamil's education was entrusted to the scholar Allama Abul Fath Kallū Qalāshpūri. He received training in Islamic theology, jurisprudence, Persian literature, and Sufism.

According to hagiographical biographies, Mirza Kamil became a disciple of Khwaja Habibullah Attar at an early age and underwent spiritual training under his supervision. Sources within the Sufi tradition describe him as having been authorized in the Kubrawiya, Qadiriyya, and Suhrawardiyya orders, leading to his title Jami al-Salasil (Master of all spiritual lineages).

== Literary works ==
Mirza Kamil's writings focused on mystical doctrine, spiritual experience, and ethical instruction. His surviving works demonstrate familiarity with classical Persian mystical literature especially the writings of Jalal al-Din Rumi and Attar of Nishapur, whose influence is evident throughout his poetry.

- Bahr al-'Irfan (Ocean of Gnosis) is considered Mirza Kamil's magnum opus and one of the largest Sufi masnavis produced in Kashmir. The work is divided into four parts and survives in manuscript form. Kashmiri copies comprise approximately 60,00 verses, although some sources estimate its total length up to 80,000 couplets. Primarily didactic in purpose, the masnavi draws extensively upon the style and themes of the Masnavi-yi Ma'navi of Jalal al-Din Rumi.
- Mukhbir al-Asrar (Informer of the Mysteries), is a mystical qasida comprising approximately 270 verses. According to traditional accounts, Kamil completed the work at the age of forty-six. The poem open with the Islamic cosmological themes, including creation of Adam and the prophetic light. The work also contains descriptions of the four metaphysical realms of Sufi cosmology, nasut (the physical world), malakut (the angelic realm), jabarut (the realm of divine power), and lahut (the realm of divine knowledge), which are presented in relation to the author's spiritual experiences.
- A small number of ghazals are attributed to Kamil. however, only one ghazal is known to have survived in extant sources.

== Death and legacy ==
Mirza Kamil died in 1718 (29th Dhu'l-Hijja 1131 AH). He was buried in Hawal, Srinagar, where his mausoleum, known as Ziyarat Mirza Kamil, attracts devotees from across Kashmir during his annual urs held on 29th of Dhu'l-Hijja.

The shrine was built by Qayimud-Din Patlo in 1720, two years after Kamil's death. A mosque was also built adjacent to the shrine. The Shrine contains several other burials including Qayimud-Din Patlo, Shah Niamatullah Kallū, Shehzada Khanum, among others.

== Sources ==
- Tikku, G.L. (1971). Persian Poetry in Kashmir 1339–1846. University of California Press. pp. 124–140. ISBN 0520093127.
- Khoyihami, Hassan Shah (January 1960). Tazkirah Auliya-e-Kashmir: Tarikh-e-Hasan; Vol. 3 تذکرۂ اولیائے کشمیر (in Urdu). Srinagar, kashmir: Ghulam Mohammad Noor Muhammad Tajiran Kutub. pp. 301–308.
- Teng, Muhammad Yusuf (1986). Kạ̄šur Ensāyiklōpīḍiyā: Ās̱ār-e Qadīmah tɨ Fan-e Taʿmīr کٲشر انسائیکلوپیڈیا: آثارِ قدیٖمَہ تٕہ فنِ تعمیر [Kashmiri Encyclopedia: Ancient Remains and Architecture] (in Kashmiri). Vol. 1 (new ed.). Jammu and Kashmir Academy of Art, Culture and Languages. pp. 87–88.
