= Ghazi Shah Chak =

Sultan of Kashmir from 1561 to 1563

- Muhammad Humayun

19th Sultan of Kashmir
- Reign: 1561–1563
- Predecessor: Habib Shah
- Successor: Husain Shah Chak
- Born: 1509; Srinagar, Kashmir Sultanate (present-day Srinagar, Jammu and Kashmir, India)
- Died: 1567 (aged 57–58)
Names
- Ghazi Shah Chak
- Dynasty: Chak dynasty
- Father: Kaji Shah Chak
- Religion: Shia Islam

Ghazi (Persian: غَازِی, romanized: Ghāzī, Persian pronunciation: [ɣɑːzi:], lit. 'warrior'; 1509–1567), born Ghāzī Shāh Chak, (Persian: غَازِی شَاہ چَک) was the first Chak Sultan, who ruled over the Kashmir sultanate . He dethroned the last Shah Mir Sultan, Habib Shah, in 1561 and succeeded him under the title of Muhammad Humayun. He was the 19th Sultan of Kashmir and ruled Kashmir till he was forced to abdicate in 1563.

Ghazi Khan Chak was the first Chak Sultan, although he didn't rule directly at first. He defeated the invading Mughal armies three times. He was most known, however, for his extreme cruelty and savagery, which was even extreme by contemporary Kashmiri standards. He used to have the prisoners of war chopped into pieces and their heads put on spikes along the passes of Kashmir. Most famously, he had the entire army of Haibat Khan Niazi butchered, along with the camp followers, including women and children. He then sent the heads of the Niazi (Pashtun) chiefs back as gifts to Islam Shah Suri, who had sent Haibat Khan to conquer Kashmir.

He was indeed so feared even by his own kinsmen that when he was blinded by leprosy, no one dared rebel against him. He ruled for nine years and then gave his throne to his brother, Husain Shah.
