= A. K. Raina =

Kashmiri artist (born 1938)

A.K. Raina
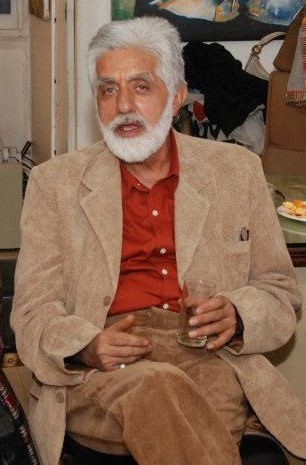
- Born: Avtar Krishan Raina; August 10, 1938 (age 87); Srinagar, Kashmir, India
- Education: College of Fine Arts Trivandrum, Kerala
- Known for: painting, drawing, design
- Spouse: Sheela Raina
- Awards: Annual State Art Exhibition, Srinagar (1967,69,73 and 76) Lalded award, Srinagar (1979) Senior fellowship Ministry of culture, govt. of India (2000) Mira Kala Samman, Indore (2004) Kalhan Award for life time achievement award Kashmiri Samiti, Indore (2004)

Avtar Krishan Raina, better known as A.K. Raina (ए.के. रैना) (born August 10, 1938), is an Indian artist.

== Biography ==
Avtar Krishan Raina was born in 1938 into a Kashmiri Pandit family in Srinagar, Kashmir. At the age of 16, he dropped out of college in Kashmir to join School of Arts, Trivandrum, in Kerala.

He started his career as a craftsman in 1959 at the age of 22 in School of Designs, Srinagar and started painting in 1965. He was a founder member and secretary of Kashmir Artist Guild in 1974. He was selected by National Institute of Design for a training program of "craft design" in 1981.

Raina was forced to leave Kashmir in 1990 during the Exodus of Kashmiri Hindus, and his house in Harwan, Srinagar was burnt down. An article in The Tribune (Chandigarh) in 2005 said: "There is an element of poignancy in his paintings as they also in a subtle way point out how he misses his homeland, which he was forced to leave due to the strife there."

His paintings have been exhibited at Kashmir Artist's Association in Srinagar (1970), Kashmir Artists Guild Exhibition in Srinagar (1974), Shridharani Gallery, New Delhi (1986), Dhoomimal Gallery in New Delhi (1987), Vadhera Art Gallery in New Delhi (1991), National Museum of Damascus (1995), Devlalikar Art Gallery in Indore (2004), Dhoomimal Gallery in New Delhi (2005), Pritamlal Dua Gallery in Indore (2011), and Dhoomimal Gallery in New Delhi (2012). In 2018 A.K. Raina was part of an exhibition of 60 Kashmiri artists from all over the world gathered at Srinagar; the exhibition was inaugurated by then governor of Jammu and Kashmir.

Today he continues to paint in his studio in Indore.

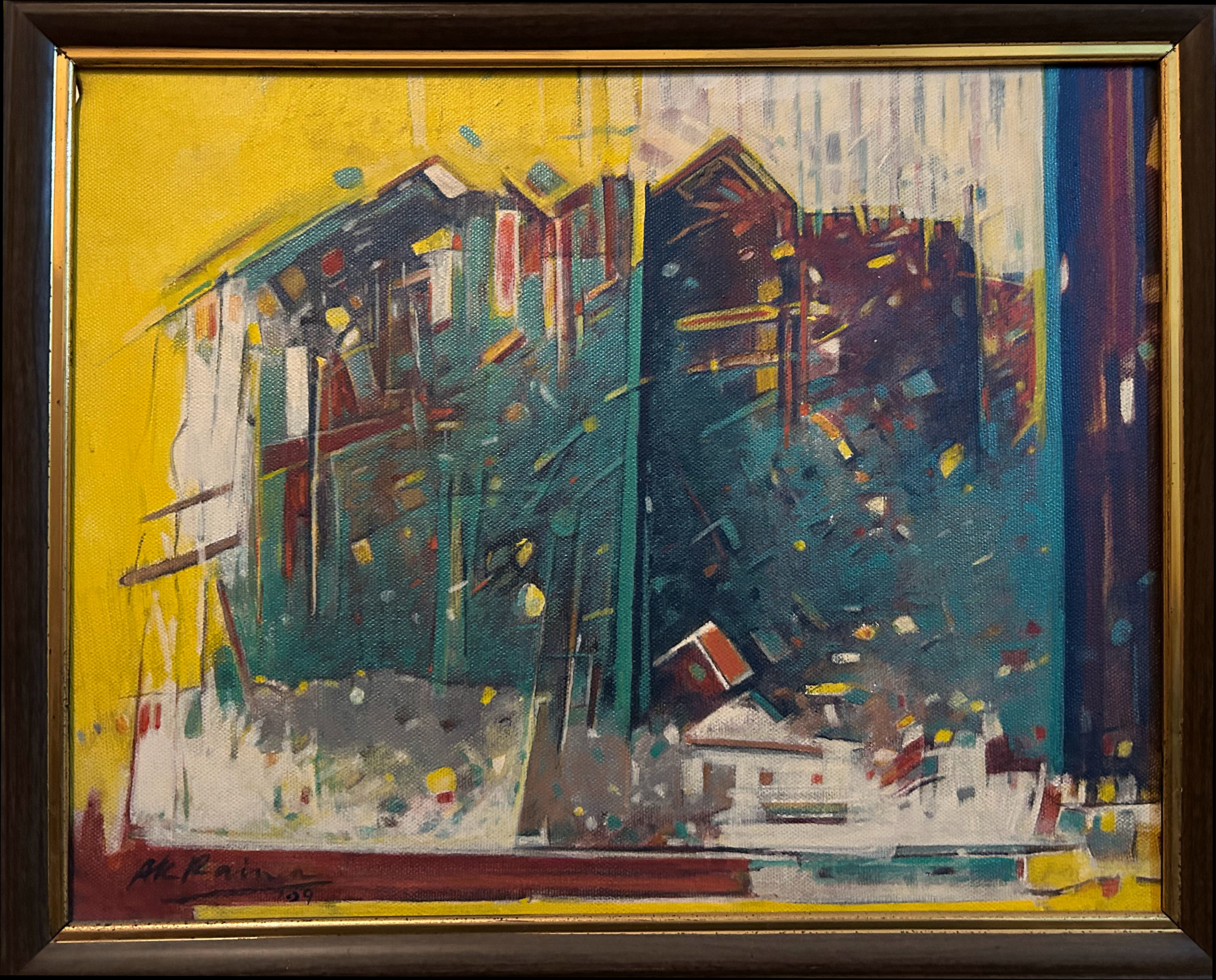
A.K. Raina, 2009, acrylic on canvas

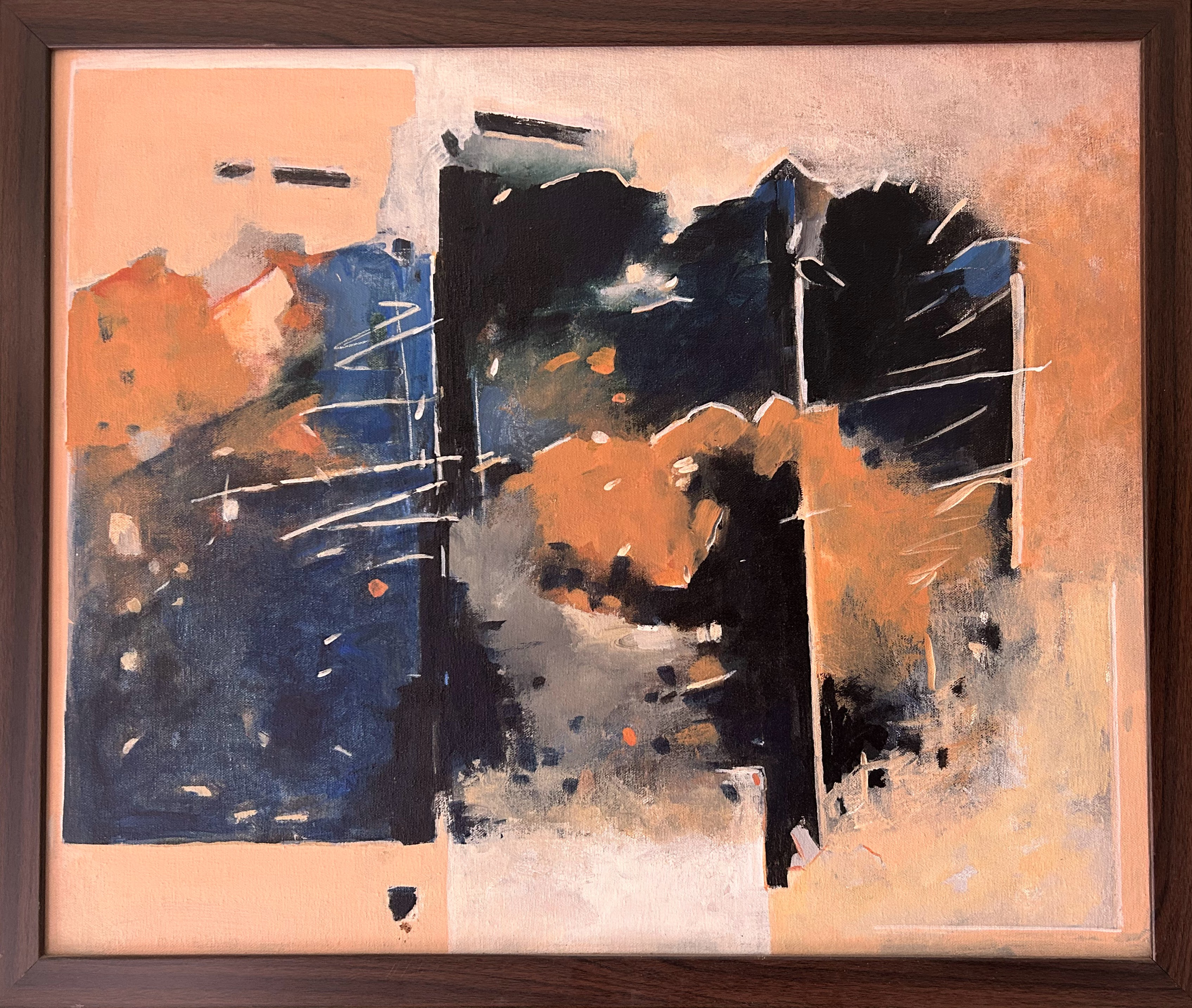
A.K. Raina, acrylic on canvas
