= Hawal =

- Town
- Nickname: Downtown
- Location in Jammu and Kashmir, India Hawal (India)
- Coordinates: 34.10481°N 74.81°E
- Country: India
- Union territory: Jammu and Kashmir
- District: Srinagar

Government
  - Type: Government of Jammu and Kashmir
  - Body: Srinagar Municipal Corporation

Languages
  - Official: Kashmiri, Hindi, Urdu, Dogri, English
- Time zone: UTC+5:30 (IST)
- Postal Code: 190003
- Vehicle registration: JK01
- Website: srinagar.nic.in

Hawal is a notified area of district Srinagar, the summer capital of union territory of Jammu and Kashmir, India. It is situated in the heart of the Srinagar just about 5 km (3.1 mi) from Lal Chowk

Srinagar's one of the first cinemas Firdaus cinema is located here .

== Known for ==
Hawal is known for Hari Parbat, Islamia College of Science and Commerce, Shrine of Mirza Kamil Badakhshi, among other places. It is also known for the 1990 Hawal massacre when the Indian Paramilitary forces fired on an unarmed funeral procession carrying the body of Mirwaiz Moulvi Farooq, a religious leader with machine guns from a camp near the Islamia College killing over 60 and injuring more than 200.
