= Muhammed Azam Didamari =

Kashmiri historian and writer (d. 1765)

Khwaja Muhammad Azam Didamari
- Born: c. 1691 or 1692; Srinagar, Mughal Kashmir
- Died: June 1765
- Burial place: Malkha Cemetery, Srinagar
- Notable work: Waqiat-i-Kashmir (history of Kashmir)

Muhammad Azam Kaul Didamari (c. 1691/1692 – June 1765), also known as Khwaja Muhammad Azam Didamari, was a Kashmiri Sufi scholar, historian and Persian-language writer. He is best known for Waqiat-i-Kashmir, also known as Tarikh-i-Azami, a history of Kashmir, completed in 1747. The work covers the region's political and religious history and includes accounts of Sufi figures, scholars, poets, natural disasters and famine.

== Life ==
Muhammad Azam was born in Srinagar, Mughal Kashmir, in 1103 AH (approximately 1691–1692 CE). His family was associated with the Didamar area of Srinagar, from which Didamari in his name is derived. He was the son of Khwaja Khair-uz-Zaman, who is also identified in some accounts as Khwaja Khar-ud-Din Ganie.

Didamari eceived his early education at a local madrasa associated with the scholars Akhwand Abdullah Shaheed and Mullah Abdullah Raziq Banday. He later pursued Sufi studies and is described in biographical accounts as a disciple of Mufti Muhammad tang. He was also associated with other Sufi religious figures, including Mirza Kamil Badakhshi, Sayyid Mir Hashim Gojwari and Haji Ubadullah Balkhi.

According to historian Pir Hasan Shah, Didamari also composed poetry and wrote several works on Sufi figures and religious subjects.

Didamari died on 10 Muharram 1179 AH corresponding to June 1765, according to historical accounts. He is buried at Malkha Cemetery in Srinagar, near the tomb of the Sufi saint Bahauddin Ganj Bakhsh.

== Works ==
=== Waq'iat-i-Kashmir ===
Didamari's principal work is Waq'iat-i-Kashmir (transl. The Events of Kashmir), a history of Kashmir written in Persian. The work is also commonly known as Tarikh-i-Azami (transl. History of Azam), after its author.

Didamari began composing the history in 1148 AH (1735 or 1736 CE) and completed it in 1159 AH (1746 or 1747 CE). The work draws on earlier historical and religious writings, several of which are identified by the author at the conclusion of the text. Urdu translations were published by Munshi Ashraf Ali (Delhi, 1846), and Hamid Yazdani (Jammu, 1988).

=== Other works ===
According to Pir Hasan Shah, Didamari wrote several other works, including:

- Faiz-i-Murad
- Fawa'id-ur-Riza
- Firaq-nama
- Qawa'id-ul-Masha'ikh
- Tajribat-ut-Talibin
- Ashjar-ul-Khuld
- Seceral qasidas and odes.

After his death his son Khwaja Muhammad Aslam added to the work with his Gauhar-i-Alam (Jewels of the World).
