= Murray Lawrence (financier) =

English first-class cricketer and financier (1935–2021)

Personal information
- Full name: Walter Nicholas Murray Lawrence
- Born: 8 February 1935; Marylebone, London, England
- Died: 15 November 2021 (aged 86)
- Batting: Right-handed

Domestic team information
- Years: Team
- 1954: Oxford University

Career statistics
Competition	First-class
Matches	3
Runs scored	2
Batting average	0.66
100s/50s	–/–
Top score	1
Catches/stumpings	3/–
- Source: Cricinfo, 30 May 2019

Walter Nicholas Murray Lawrence (8 February 1935 – 15 November 2021) was an English first-class cricketer and financier.

== Early life and career ==
Born at Marylebone to Henry Walter Neville Lawrence (son of Sir Walter Roper Lawrence, 1st Baronet,) and his wife, Sarah Butler, he was educated at Sandroyd School and then Winchester College, before going up to Trinity College, Oxford.

As an undergraduate he made his debut in first-class cricket for Oxford University against Middlesex at Oxford in 1954. He made two further first-class appearances in 1954, playing once more for Oxford University against Hampshire County Cricket Club, and for the Free Foresters against Oxford University. He was also a Member of Marylebone Cricket Club.

After graduating from Oxford, Lawrence pursued a career in insurance underwriting. He served as Chairman of Lloyd's of London from 1988–1990.

== Personal life and death ==
In 1961, Lawrence married Sally Louise O'Dwyer, daughter of Lieutenant-Colonel Alleyn Becher O'Dwyer, late Irish Guards. The couple had two daughters:

- Sarah Louise, born 1962, married firstly Andrew Crawley (died 1988) and secondly Henry Slack, having issue by both marriages.
- Catherine Jane, born 1964, married 1992 Rupert Edmund Ivo Elliott, barrister, and has issue; two sons and a daughter.

Murray Lawrence died on 15 November 2021, at the age of 86.

== See also ==
- Lawrence baronets
