= Prithivi Nath Kaul Bamzai =

Kashmiri scholar and historian

Prithivi Nath Kaul Bamzai (1910–2007) was a Kashmiri scholar and historian who wrote several books on the history of Kashmir and Central Asia.

== Works ==
P. N. K. Bamzai was born in 1910 into a Kashmiri Pandit family of scholarly traditions, and received his first lessons in historical research from his father, Anand Koul, who was a pioneer of research on the history and folklore of Kashmir.

Bamzai graduated from the Punjab University with honours in English Literature. During his tenure as a student, he accumulated a series of accomplishments and awards, notable among which were the Lord Chelsford Gold Medal for all-round best graduate and the Suraj Narain Gold Medal for his research on the social and economic condition of Kashmir during his student life.

Bamzai then joined the Kashmir State Information Department as Special Officer. During this period, he was requested by Kashmir's prime minister, Sheikh Abdullah, to research and write a comprehensive history of Kashmir. In 1954, Bamzai joined the Publications Division of the Ministry of Information and Broadcasting, Government of India, as Editor of the Illustrated Kashmir. He went on to serve as Editor of almost every journal published by the Ministry of Information and Broadcasting, and was instrumental in launching the March of India, a journal that recorded the aspirations and advances of newly independent India. Subsequently, he was deputed by the Government of India to work as Adviser to the Government of Ethiopia, where he established the publication wing of the ministry. During this period, he was awarded numerous fellowships and felicitations by several government and non-government organisations for his contribution to Kashmiri history.

Bamzai's articles and papers pertaining to the history of Kashmir have been published in several journals in India and abroad. His books on the subject include A History of Kashmir, which carries a foreword by Jawaharlal Nehru.

Dr R. K. Parmu observed that Bamzai's book lacked historical research and did not separate the historical material from the non-historical content. Sten Widmalm, an academic who specialises in comparative politics, has also expressed reservations, saying that Bamzai's three-volume history of Kashmir is "an important source of information but also contain[s] descriptions of the population that only reproduce the race biology of the 1930s". He also intimates that Bamzai may have re-used or closely copied "formulations" previously published by others. More contemporaneous with publication was a 1965 review in The English Historical Review which noted that A History of Kashmir was the first attempt by anyone to produce a comprehensive study of the region from pre-history to the present day and that it generally succeeded.

== Bibliography ==
- Bamzai, P. N. K. (1962), A History of Kashmir: Political, Social, Cultural, from the Earliest Times to the Present Day. Delhi: Metropolitan Book Co. OCLC 1097578
- Bamzai, P. N. K. (1966), Kashmir and Power Politics: From Lake Success to Tashkent. Delhi: Metropolitan Book Co. OCLC 249511312
- Bamzai, P. N. K. (1973), A History of Kashmir: Political, Social, Cultural, from the Earliest Times to the Present Day. 2nd ed. New Delhi: Metropolitan Book Co. OCLC 693704
- Bamzai, P. N. K. (1973), Jammu and Kashmir. [New Delhi]: Publications Division, Ministry of Information and Broadcasting, Govt. of India.
- Koul, Anand, and Prithivi Nath Kaul Bamzai (1978), Geography of the Jammu & Kashmir State. New Delhi: Light & Life Publishers.
- Bamzai, P. N. K. (1980), Kashmir and Central Asia. New Delhi: Light & Life Publishers.
- Bamzai, P. N. K. (1987), Socio-Economic History of Kashmir, 1846-1925. New Delhi: Metropolitan Book Co.
- Bamzai, P. N. K. (1994a), Culture and Political History of Kashmir. Volume 1: Ancient Kashmir. New Delhi: M.D. Publications.
- Bamzai, P. N. K. (1994b), Culture and Political History of Kashmir. Volume 2: Mediaeval Kashmir. New Delhi: M.D. Publications.
- Bamzai, P. N. K. (1994c), Culture and Political History of Kashmir. Volume 3: Modern Kashmir. New Delhi: M.D. Publications.
