= Hassan Khoyihami =

Kashmiri historian, poet and scholar (1832–1898)

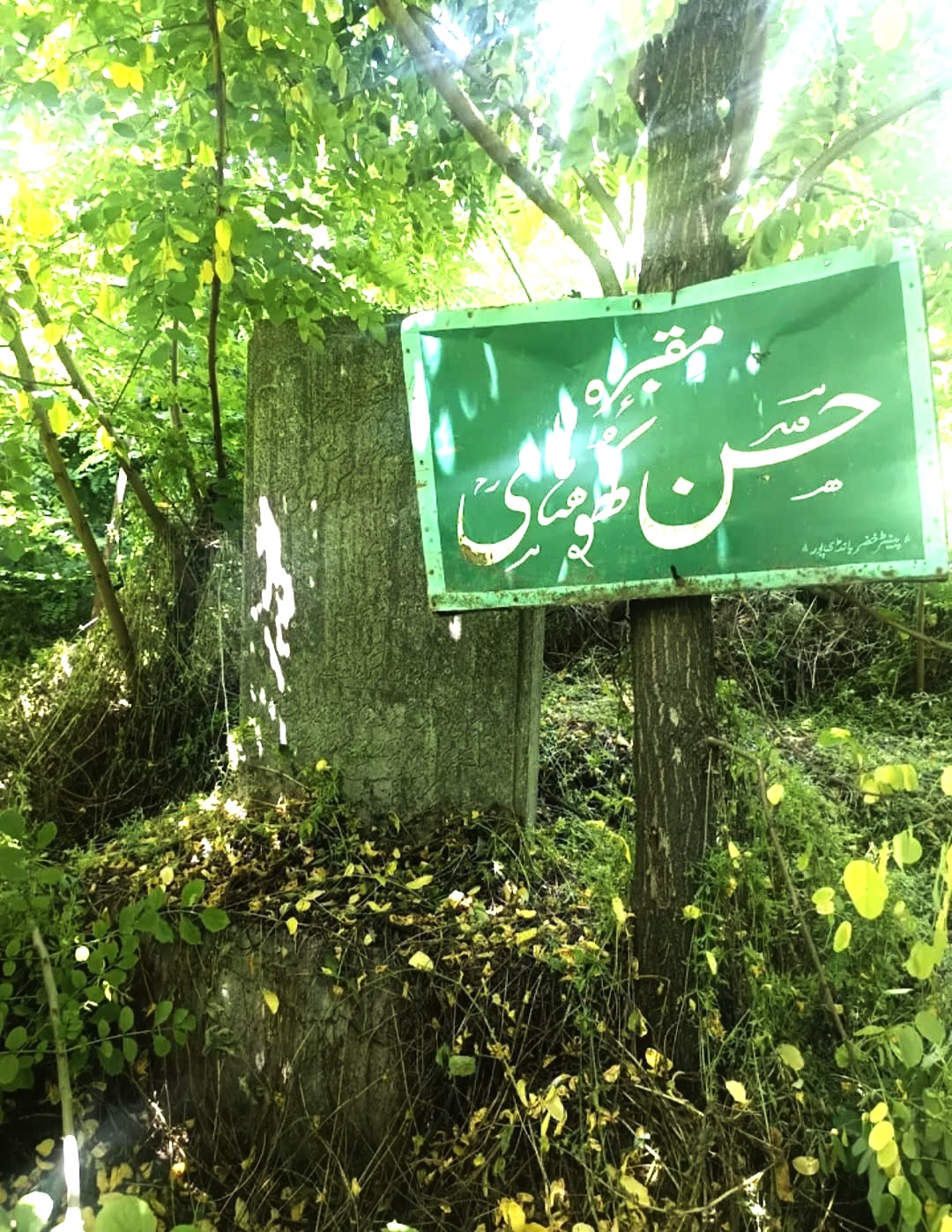
- Tomb of Hassan Shah Khoyihami
- Born: Pir Ghulam Hassan Shah c. 1832; Gamroo, Bandipora
- Died: c. 1898
- Resting place: Gamroo, Bandipora
- Occupations: Historian, geographer, poet
- Era: 19th C.E
- Notable work: Tarikh-i-Hassan
- Father: Sheikh Ghulam Rasool

Hassan Shah Khoyihami (c. 1832 – c. 1898), born Pir Ghulam Hassan Shah and commonly known as Pir Ghulam Hassan Shah, was a nineteenth-century Kashmiri historian, scholar, and poet from Gamroo village near Bandipora. He is best remembered for the Tarikh-i-Hassan, a four-volume Persian-language work encompassing the geography, history, Sufi biography, and literary heritage of the Kashmir Valley.

His life spanned the Dogra era, from the reign of Maharaja Gulab Singh to that of Maharaja Pratap Singh, and his writings remain an important reference for the study of Kashmiri history and of Kashmiri culture. He notably engaged with the Rajatarangini manuscripts, adapting ancient historical narratives into a chronological Persian format. The Government Degree College, Bandipora was officially named the 'Hassan Khoyihami Memorial Degree College Bandipora' in his honour.

== Biography ==
Hassan Shah's seventh paternal ancestor, Ganesh Kaul, belonged to the Dattatreya Kaul gotra and served in the Mughal judiciary. He was converted to Islam by the saint Sultan ul-Arifin Sheikh Hamza Makhdoom, upon which he was renamed Sheikh Ghaziuddin; the entire family converted with him. Hassan's ancestral spiritual allegiance thus traced back to Sheikh Hamza Makhdoom, whom he venerated as his hereditary pir. He was himself later initiated into the Naqshbandi order by Khawaja Muhammad Tashkandi.

His father, Sheikh Ghulam Rasool (Pir Ghulam Rasool Sheva), was a scholar of distinction with mastery over Arabic and Persian and authored four works: Mujmua, Risal-Turfa, Ajab Manzar, and Karamat-i-Awalia. Professor Hajini observed that virtually everything Hassan acquired in Persian and Arabic he owed to his father's instruction. Hassan was the eldest of four brothers: Pir Ghulam Ahmad Jayid, Pir Ghulam Mohiuddin, and Mohd Pir.

Born in 1832, Hassan came of age at the moment Maharaja Gulab Singh acquired Kashmir from the British for seventy-five lakh rupees and ascended the throne in 1846, establishing Dogra rule over the Valley. Though born before the Dogra ascendancy, he was shaped by that era and observed its transformations with the eye of a critical scholar. He came to the attention of Sir Walter Lawrence, the Land Settlement Officer in Kashmir from 1889 to 1895, who acknowledged him as his principal teacher of the Kashmiri language. Lawrence wrote in his work, The Valley of Kashmir (1895), "What else I have learnt I owe to Pir Hassan Shah, a learned Kashmiri, whose work lies entirely among the villagers". Lawrence notes in his book that Hassan had wide contacts and was connected both with the common people and with the elite.

Hassan Shah died on 28 Jamadi-us-Sani 1316 A.H. (13 November 1898) at the age of sixty-eight, at Gamroo. He was buried there in the precincts of the mazar of Mir Bibi Khatun, a pious woman of his village.

== Notable works ==
Khoyihami produced a number of notable works, including:

- Tarikh-i-Hassan (four volumes) – his magnum opus; a comprehensive history, geography, and biographical encyclopaedia of Kashmir.
- Nagme-e-Gulistan – a Persian masnawi of 2,939 couplets, completed in 1283 A.H.; unpublished.
- Aijaz Garaeba – a work on the miracles of the Islamic prophet Muhammad.
- Khairyat Asrar – unpublished.

=== Tarikh-i-Hassan ===
Khoyihami's Tarikh-i-Hassan is a Persian-language historical work comprising four volumes, compiled in the nineteenth century and published in 1954 by the Research and Publication Department of the Jammu and Kashmir Government. A translation by Prof. Dr. Hussein Shareef Qasmi has made the text accessible to a broader audience.

- Volume I, is an encyclopedic account of Kashmir's physical and human geography, with separate chapters on roads, birds, animals, mountains, springs, lakes, seasons, peoples, religions, temples, mosques, caves, mines, and meadows; by the twentieth century, it was regarded as the most comprehensive single work on Kashmir's geography.
- Volume II, traces the history of Kashmir from ancient times to the Dogra period, drawing on Kalhana's Rajatarangini and the Ratnakar Purana, while also supplementing gaps in earlier chronicles; his treatment of the medieval period, in particular, reflects remarkable skill as a historian.
- Volume III, initiated in 1305 A.H., documents the lives of great Sayyid, Rishis, seers, scholars, and saints of Kashmir and reflects the author's allegiance to the Suhrawardiyya order.
- Volume IV, is devoted to the Persian poets of Kashmir, preserving the literary heritage of a tradition that flourished under the Mughals (1586–1752) and continued through the reign of Maharaja Pratap Singh (1885–1925).

One of the most significant contributions of Volume II is its preservation of the accounts of kings absent from Kalhana's Rajatarangi. Hassan had carefully studied Waqia-i-Kashmir, a Persian translation of the Sanskrit Ratnakar Purana compiled by Mulla Ahmad, court poet of Sultan Zayn al-Abidin the Great (r. 1420–1470). He obtained a manuscript copy from Mulla Mahmud, an Afghan resident of the village of Pindore (now in Pakistan). While travelling by boat in Srinagar, Hassan's vessel capsized; he was rescued, but the manuscript was lost to the river. He nonetheless incorporated what he had learned from it into Tarikh-i-Hassan. Writing in the Journal and Proceedings of the Asiatic Society of Bengal, Pandit Ananda Koul noted that after Hassan's death, no further copy of Mulla Ahmad's translation could be traced, leaving Tarikh-i-Hassan as the sole surviving source for these lost kings.

== Legacy ==
Khoyihami is regarded as one of the most important historians of the Kashmir Valley. His contribution is the preservation of accounts of the thirty-five kings of Kashmir who are absent from Kalhana's twelfth-century Rajatarangi because the Ratnakar Purana and Mulla Ahmad's Persian translation were both lost, Tarikh-i-Hassan remains the sole surviving record of these rulers, making it irreplaceable for the ancient history of Kashmir. In his birthplace, Bandipora, the Government Degree College, Bandipora was named the 'Hassan Khoyihami Memorial Degree College Bandipora in his honour.

== See also ==
- List of Kashmiri people
