= Walter Roper Lawrence =

Sir Walter Roper Lawrence Bt GCIE GCVO CB
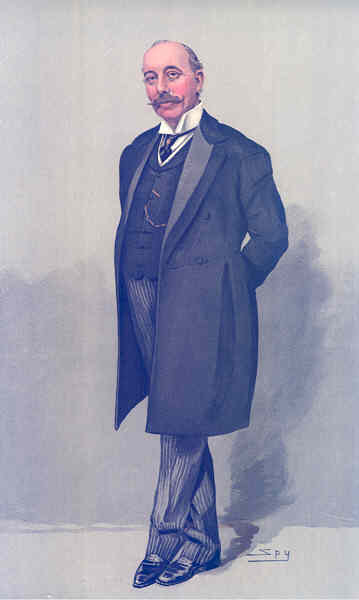
- Born: 9 February 1857; Moreton, Herefordshire, England
- Died: 25 May 1940 (aged 83); Hook Heath, Surrey
- Occupations: Colonial administrator, Author
- Notable work: The Valley of Kashmir (1895); The India we served (1929);
- Spouse: Lilian James
- Parent(s): George Lawrence and Catherine Lewis
- Relatives: Murray Lawrence (grandson)

Sir Walter Roper Lawrence, 1st Baronet, GCIE GCVO CB (9 February 1857 – 25 May 1940), was a member of the Council of India and an English author who served in the Indian Civil Service in British India and wrote travelogues based on his experiences of travelling around the Indian subcontinent. Over the course of his travels, he developed a close affinity with Indian people, especially Kashmiris, who figure prominently in his work. His best-known books are The Valley of Kashmir (1895) and The India we Served (1929).

Walter Roper Lawrence was born on 9 February 1857 at his home village Moreton-on-Lugg, Herefordshire, England, the son of George Lawrence and Catherine Lewis. He married Lilian Gertrude James on 18 March 1885.

== Life in British India ==
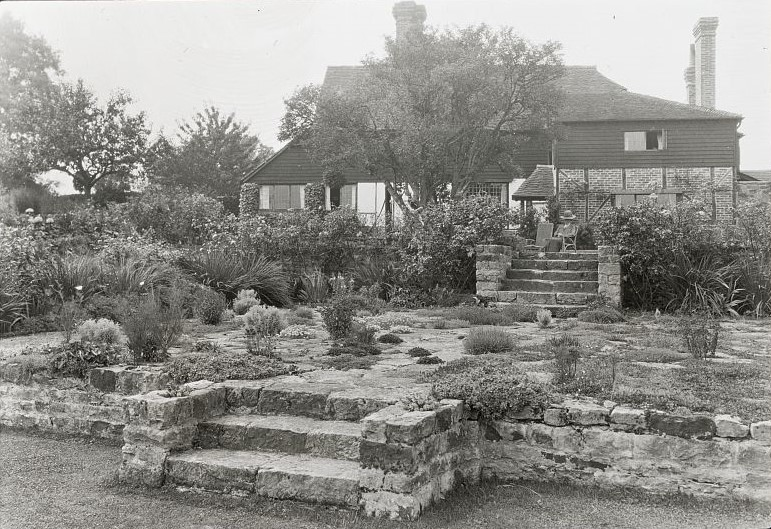
Sir Walter Lawrence's house at East Grinstead, Sussex, by Frances Benjamin Johnston, 1925

Lawrence served in the Indian Civil Service Punjab (1879–1895). He was appointed as the Settlement Commissioner for Jammu and Kashmir between 1889–1894, during the rule of Maharaja Pratap Singh. While travelling in Kashmir, he recorded and produced a brief history on account of the geography, the culture of the people and the tyrannic Dogra rule over Kashmir. During his brief visit to Kashmir Valley, he authored the first recorded complete encyclopaedia of Kashmir, The Valley of Kashmir.

In 1896, Lawrence left the Indian Civil Service. He was recalled by the Viceroy of India Lord Curzon to act as his private secretary. Lawrence served in this role during 1899–1903. He was appointed a Companion of the Order of the Indian Empire (CIE) in 1891, and promoted Knight Commander (KCIE) in the 1903 Durbar Honours.

Sir Walter Lawrence then accompanied the Prince and Princess of Wales to India as Chief of Staff on their tour in 1905–06. In 1907, he served as a member of the Council of India. During the First World War, he worked on various missions for the Secretary of State for War Lord Kitchener. In 1918 he was on the staff of the Indian Air Force with the rank of Major General.

In 1919, Lawrence served on the British Mission to Palestine and Syria.

== Writing ==
As an author his major works are The Valley of Kashmir (1895) and The India we served (1929).

Lawrence was the first to report the miseries faced by the people of Kashmir under the rule of Dogras.

== Death ==
Sir Walter died at the age of 83 on 25 May 1940. His grandson, Murray Lawrence (1935–2021), was father-in-law of Rupert Elliott, Master Haberdasher (2023/24).

== See also ==
- Lawrence Baronets

Baronetage of the United Kingdom
New creation	Baronet (of Sloane Gardens); 1906–1940	Succeeded by Percy Lawrence
