= Chak dynasty =

Shia dynasty of the Kashmir Sultanate (1561–1589)

House of Chak
- Royal family
- Royal Standard
- Country: Kashmir Sultanate
- Current region: Shi'a Islam
- Origin: Gilgit, Dardistan
- Founded: 1561; 465 years ago
- Founder: Ghazi Shah Chak
- Final ruler: Yakub Shah Chak
- Titles: List: Sultan‐i Kashmir; Shah; Padishah; Sultan al-Az'am; Ghazi; Khan; Malik; Amir al-Umara; Mirza; Khan-i Zaman
- Style: Sultan
- Connected families: Shah Mir; Magre; Bhat
- Traditions: Islamic; Kashmiri; Persian
- Estate: Srinagar
- Dissolution: 8 August 1589; 437 years ago
- Deposition: 14 October 1586; 440 years ago

The Chak dynasty (Persian: چک; Kashmiri: ژَکھ) was a Kashmiri dynasty of Shina origin that ruled over the Kashmir Sultanate, succeeding the Shah Mir dynasty. The dynasty rose to power in 1561 in Srinagar after the death of the Turco-Mongol military general, Mirza Haidar Dughlat when Ghazi Shah assumed the throne by dethroning Habib Shah, the last Shah Miri sultan. The dynasty was dethroned in 1589 when Yakub Shah surrendered to the Mughal emperor, Akbar.

== Origins ==
Lankar Chak, a direct ancestor of the ruling Chaks, migrated from Gilgit, Dardistan to Kashmir with his family during the reign of Suhadeva. The Chaks became highly influential after the invasion of the Mongol commander Zulchu as they started to gain the confidence of the nobles and councillors. They also served the first Sultan of Kashmir, Rinchan as members of his court. After Rinchan's death Udyanadeva was given authority but soon fled the country. Kota Rani assumed the throne and appointed Chaks in many important offices in her cabinet. Kota Rani was later challenged by Shah Mir, a close associate of Rinchan. The Chaks sided with Shah Mir and gave their all for Shah Mir's sake. Shah Mir later succeeded and appointed Lankar Chak as his Mīr Bakhshī (Commander-in-Chief), the most important post in the Kashmir army. The Chaks later declined and restricted much of their activities until the times of Zain-ul-Abidin when Pandu Chak, the leader of the Chaks led a rebellion against Zain.

Chaks were ferocious and formidable warriors who defeated armies despite numerical inferiority. They had special instinct in battle competence and excelled in battle strategies, especially in guerilla tactics.

== Early years ==
=== Pandu Chak ===
During the early period of Sultan Zain-ul-Abidin's reign, the leader of Chak, Pandu Chak, started a rebellion against him due to corvée system and the despotic feudalism. The sultan forced the Chak inhabitants of Kamraj to work without any pay. In response, Pandu with his followers set the palace and the government buildings on fire. He later escaped to Trehgam and then to Drava where he encountered the sultan. The sultan convinced the inhabitants of Drava and had Pandu captured.

=== Shams Chak and Hussain Chak ===
Sultan Fateh Shah, just after his ascension in 1486, decided to overthrow his newly appointed vizier, Malik Saif Dar. For this, he needed the support of his ministers including Shams Chak. Shams Chak was a member of Chak family of Kupwara which split off from the leading family of Srinagar and Sopore. Shams Chak along with Sayyid Muhammad, Nusrat Raina, Sarhang Raina and Musa Raina defeated Malik Saif Dar. Malik Saif Dar was killed while Shams was appointed as his Wazir. Shams later married the daughter of Pandu Chak's son Hussain Chak thus uniting the two families. After a two and a half year of peace, relations between Shams Chak and Sayyid Muhammad became tense. A civil conflict erupted in 1493 with the Sultan and Kaji Shah Chak, the son of Hussain Chak, siding with Shams. Shams was defeated and the Sultan was deposed. Muhammad Shah was declared the Sultan for the second time with Sayyid securing the seat of Wazir for himself.

Shams Chak did not stay quiet for long and gathered his forces again. He also advised Fath Shah to ready himself and his troops. In 1505, Shams Chak along with Fath Shah, marched to Sopore and after an extended armed clash defeated Sultan Muhammad. On ascending the throne, Sultan Fath appointed Shams to the post of Wazir but due to Shams' ruthless attitude towards the rest of the ministers, an assassination plot was schemed. In the middle of the night, a group of assassins entered Shams' room and murdered him. It is reported that Shams, even though he had no weapons except a small knife, killed three of the assassins and wounded one. Nevertheless, with the murder of Shams, Kaji Chak took over as the chief of the Chak dynasty while Musa Raina was appointed as the wazir.

== Civil uprisings (1505 – 1517) ==
Musa Raina died shortly after in a civil conflict and was succeeded by Ibrahim Magre, who, due to his incompetence, fled from the valley. Malik Usman Dangre became the new vizier but just after two months, a plot was schemed against him by Kaji Chak, Jahangir Padar and Gadai Malik with the support of Sultan Fateh. The group first stomped over Dati Malik in the palace, killing him. They then turned towards Malik Usman and threw him into the prison. Jahangir Padar stood up as the Wazir but Ibrahim Magre, after a month of the recent events, came back from Punjab with a much larger force and defeated Jahangir and Kaji. Kaji, with Jahangir and the rest of the Chaks, fled to Punjab. Ibrahim served only for a year that a league was formed against him and was removed from his office. Malik Usman was again acknowledged as the Wazir.

After 5 months of peace, the Chaks under Kaji and the Magres under Ibrahim called for an alliance and decided to overthrow Usman along with Sultan Fateh by enthroning Muhammad Shah in his place. Meanwhile, Usman with the Rainas supported Sultan Fateh. The Chaks and the Magres encamped at Sopore after reaching Poonch and then Baramulla. Malik Usman and the Rainas also encamped at Sopore such that only the Jhelum River separated them. Usman left behind Shankar and Sultan Fateh while he himself decided to attack Muhammad's forces after advancing through the Wular Lake. Lohar Magre and Regi Chak intercepted this plan as both the sides met at Khuyahom pargana. Lohar and Regi's forces were soundly defeated but rumours were spread that Usman has been defeated and killed and Muhammad's forces will cross the river and seize Sultan Fateh. Sultan Fateh, hearing this, panicked and escaped through the Tosa Maidan Pass. Usman, disheartened, also made his flight but was captured and killed. The Rainas were pardoned as they submitted.

Muhammad Shah became the Sultan for the third time in 1514 and appointed Ibrahim Magre his Wazir but Fateh Shah, just after 9 months in 1515, decided to invade Kashmir again. He gained the support of the Padars especially Jahangir as well as of Regi, Kaji and other Chak nobles. Sultan Muhammad along with Ibrahim showed no resistance and left the Valley for Punjab. Fateh Shah was crowned the Sultan again with Jahangir Padar as his Wazir. Sultan Fateh was only a figure-head as he only received the revenues of the crown land. The valley itself was divided between Jahangir Padar, Shankar Raina and Kaji Chak.

In the autumn of 1515, Muhammad and Ibrahim entered Kashmir again but Ibrahim was killed in Bangil along with his sons, Abdal Magre and Firuz Magre. In 1517, Muhammad again tried to enter Kashmir and gain the support of the nobles with 3000 men who were supplied to him by Sultan Sikandar of Delhi. With all the efforts, Muhammad gained the support of Kaji Chak, Shankar Raina and Nusrat Raina and therefore raised the banner of revolt against Sultan Fateh. Sultan Fateh, defeated, was exiled to Punjab where he died. His body was brought back to the village where he was buried beside the grave of Zain-ul-Abidin by the orders of Sultan Muhammad.

== Rise to power (1517 – 1540) ==
This time, Kaji Chak was appointed as the wazir. This was the second time that a Chak was appointed in the central government of the Sultanate.

=== Tribal Conflicts between Chaks and other tribes ===
Seeing the germinating power of the Chaks with the appointment of Kaji, Rainas under Nusrat and Magres under Lohar made an alliance against the Chaks while Padars under Jahangir joined hands with Kaji. Nusrat decided to deliver a night attack but Kaji was informed on time before the attack. Both the sides met at Zialdakar. Kaji was wounded but Nusrat's fall demoralized the forces hence a victory for the Chaks. Shankar who was in prison all along also died of a natural cause.

In early 1520, Kaji sent forces to arrest Jahangir but he soon fled to Dardu, ending their short-lived friendship. Kaji later sent his son Masud, who plundered his house and returned to Srinagar. In the May of 1521, the nobles including Malik Abdal, the son of Ibrahim Magre, Lohar Magre and Idi Raina decided to elevate Fateh Shah's son Sikandar Khan to the throne and captured the fort of Nagam. They were soon joined by Jahangir Padar and Gadai Malik who were in Dardu. To overcome this resistance, Kaji sent his nephew, Daulat Chak, Masud Chak and Taji Chak along with Sayyid Ibrahim Baihaqi. Both the sides received many casualties. Gadai Malik and Masud Chak were killed while Sikandar and Jahangir ran to Punjab. Lohar Magre and Idi Raina were later pardoned by Sultan Muhammad. Soon after this event in 1522, the Rainas and Magres again came into conflict with the Chaks but this time favouring Fateh Shah's another son Habib Khan but Idi Raina defected to the enemy side giving no chance for the Magres to react and were hence defeated and exiled. Habib Khan was also killed on the way. Kaji later called the Magres back and entered into marriage alliances with them.

=== Mughal Invasions ===
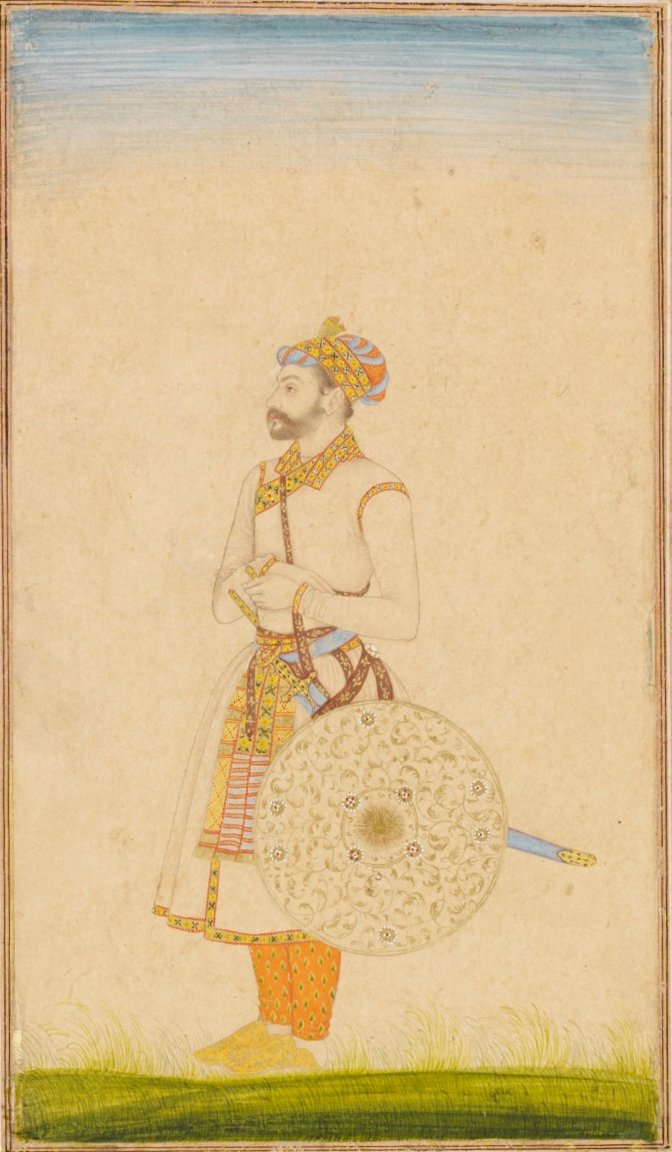
Pir Muhammad Khan Shirwani

All these victories made Kaji very powerful but Sultan Muhammad was unpleased as he only saw himself a ruler in name. He gathered some of the important nobles including Malik Abdal, Lohar Magre, Malik Ali Chadurah and even Regi Chak and schemed a plot to overthrow Kaji. Kaji, however, sent his cousin Nauroz Chak to resist. Disappointed after seeing the nobles he depended on desert him, Kaji went away to Naushahra in 1527. In the same year, a Mughal army under Kuchak Beg and Shaikh Ali Beg invaded Kashmir to help Sikandar Khan gain the throne. The Kashmiri force led by Kaji's brothers, Hussain Chak and Taji Chak along with Kaji's son Ghazi Chak fought and thoroughly defeated the Mughal soldiers. Kaji who was still in Naushahra seized Sikandar who had called the Mughals. Regretting on his actions, Sultan Muhammad called Kaji back and made him his Wazir again. Sikandar, on the other hand, was blinded and thrown into the prison where he died after few days. A resistance was again seen by the Magres but Kaji and Sayyid Ibrahim routed the rebels. Tensions were also seen between Kaji and Sultan Muhammad and after gaining the trust of the nobles, deposed Muhammad in favour of his son Ibrahim Shah.

Just after the enthronement, Malik Ali Chadura, Regi Chak and the Magres decided to send Abdal Magre to request emperor Babur for military support against Kaji Chak. Babur provided them with troops under his two commanders Shaikh Ali Beg and Muhammad Khan. They then declared Nazuk Shah as the Sultan and marched onto the Kashmir Valley against Kaji and Sultan Ibrahim. Both the sides met at Tapar (Bochu). Even though the rebels looked weak, they defeated Kaji's forces and entered Srinagar Victoriously. Kaji and Daulat Chak escaped while Sayyid Ibrahim and Ghazi Chak were taken prisoners. Sultan Ibrahim was deposed and Nazuk Shah was made the next Sultan with Abdal Magre as his Wazir. Exactly after a year, the nobles became frustrated with Sultan Nazuk and deposed him in the summer of 1530 in favour of Sultan Muhammad who was in prison all along. Except for the crown land, the kingdom was divided equally between Abdal Magre, Lohar Magre, Regi Chak and Malik Ali Chadura.

The Mughal troops were escorted back by Ali Chadura. Mughal commanders, who returned back, informed Kamran Mirza, the Mughal governor of Punjab, that it was not difficult to invade and conquer Kashmir due to the disunity. In 1531, Kamran, along with his commanders, Mahram Beg and Shaikh Ali Beg, marched onto Kashmir for an invasion. The Mughal forces invaded and conquered almost all important forts and cities including the capital Srinagar itself except for Athwajan. Kaji, who was at the time in the Salt Range, was requested by the Kashmiris to join them in Athwajan against the Mughals. Kaji, at once, set out towards Athwajan. His arrival increased their morale as such that they defeated Mughals first at Athwajan and then in Srinagar. Peace was established as Kaji and Mahram both discussed matters in a boat in River Jhelum. Mughals were given presents and escorted back by Daulat Chak and Jahangir Magre. The Kingdom was again divided among Abdal Magre, who continued as Wazir, Lohar Magre, Kaji Chak, Regi Chak and Malik Ali Chadura while Jagirs were given to Malik Ali Chadura and the Crown Land to Sultan Muhammad.

=== Kashgarian Invasion by Haidar Dughlat (1533) ===
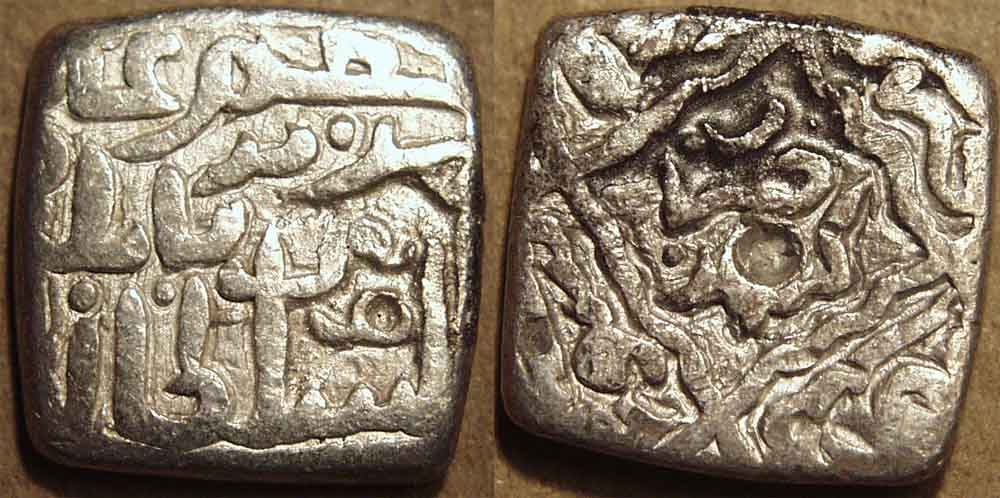
Silver coin of Muhammad Haidar Dughlat issued in the name of Sultan Said Khan

In January 1533, Mirza Haidar Dughlat, leading the Kashgarian army of Yarkent Khanate, entered Kashmir for an invasion. The Kashmiris resisted them at Lar (Gagangir) but were defeated and forced to take refuge in the fort of Hanjik. The Kashgarians then marched onto Naushahra, occupying it easily. The next stop was the fort of Rajdan, which Mirza Haidar foritifed. From Rajdan, the Kashgarians set out towards Srinagar, killing every possible man they saw in their journey and taking women and children as slaves. Mirza Haidar sent Baba Sharq Mirza to engage against Malik Ali Chadura sent by Kaji Chak in the village of Bavan near Lidder Valley. The Kashmiris fought valiantly but were defeated when Malik Ali Chadura and other Kashmiri chiefs were killed. Kaji Chak and Abdal Magre decided to adopt guerilla tactics and started making surprise attacks, which proved successful.

Mirza Haidar, on the advice of his Mirza Ali Taghai, decided to attack the families of the Kashmiri soldiers in the Valley. This didn't turn out as planned as the Kashgarians were constantly harassed by the Kashmiris from place to place. Due to this disadvantage, the morale of the Kashgarian army dropped down, tired of warfare and longing for their homes. Mirza Haidar, seeing this, decided to quit the invasion and made peace deals with the Kashmiri nobles. Many agreements were made like the Khutba being read in the name of Sultan Said Khan of Yarkent Khanate, the releasing of the Kashmiri prisoners and gifts and presents presented to Sultan Muhammad by the Kashgarians. After the Kashgarians left the country, a famine struck the country as there was almost no cultivation the whole year. This lasted for just a year as peace prevailed in the country for three years.

=== Tribal strife against Magres and Rainas ===
Sultan Muhammad died in 1537 and his second son Shamsu'd-Din succeeded him. Kaji took this as an opportunity and attacked the Magres and Rainas. Regi supported the nobles against Kaji. Kaji was defeated, routed and exiled to Punjab. In the spring of 1538, Regi went to Jammu to marry the daughter of the Raja Kapoor Dev. Kaji again saw a chance and came back to the Valley with assistance from the Gakhar chief, Sarang Khan Gakhar. Kaji marched towards the fort of Sopore to besiege it as the Magres and the chiefs of Chadura hid in it. Regi, after knowing the civil unrest, returned to Srinagar. Kaji left his forces and commanders including Daulat, Ghazi and Ibrahim to blockade the force while he himself mounted to Srinagar to attack Regi. Kaji won against Regi and on the other hand, the Magres were also defeated by Chaks in Sopore. After the fall of Abdal Magre, Kaji again became the Wazir while the Sultan Shamsu'd-Din died shortly after in 1540. Ismail Shah, another son of Muhammad Shah, was appointed as the Sultan. To settle the disputes, the Kingdom was split among Kaji, Sayyid Ibrahim and Sultan Ismail.

== Invasion by Mirza Haidar Dughlat ==
In early 1540, Abdal Magre and Regi Chak sent a message to Mirza Haidar to help them against Kaji. Mirza Haidar, who was now serving under the Mughals, was busy fighting the Suris and could not proceed to Kashmir. But after emperor Humayun's defeat in the Battle of Kannauj, the nobles again tried to persuade Mirza Haidar for help. Mirza Haidar was granted permission from Emperor Humayun and was given 400 men. Emperor Humayun even decided to accompany Mirza Haidar but changed his decision after reaching Sialkot due to the dishonesty of his officers who were going to escort him to Kashmir. Mirza Haidar was joined by Abdal Magre and Regi Chak. Kaji hearing this advanced to Kapartal Pass near Rajauri but Mirza Haidar changed the journey plan and passed through the Poonch Pass. This baffled Kaji, who, along with Sultan Ismail, fled to Sher Shah for support. Mirza Haidar easily occupied the Valley, installing Nazuk Shah as the Sultan and Abdal Magre as the Wazir. He himself acted as the Mughal governor of Kashmir. The Kingdom was divided among Mirza Haidar, Sultan Nazuk and Abdal Magre but Abdal died in March 1541 of paralysis and his Jagir and his office of Wazir was transferred to his son Hussain Magre.

Kaji Chak, on the other hand, was given 5000 men and two elephants along with the Afghan commanders Adil Khan and Husain Khan Sherwani by Sher Shah Suri. With this army, Kaji invaded the Valley and engaged with Mirza Haidar's forces at Watanar. Both the sides were also engaged in skirmishes but most went indecisive. The final stand between the Chaks and the Mughals was at Vahator. The Battle of Vahator took place on 13 August 1541 but the Chaks were soundly defeated. Kaji, Daulat and Ibrahim with the Afghani troops fled from the valley. In 1543, Regi resented the unethical attitude of Mirza Haidar towards the nobles. This angered Haidar who went against Regi in Kamraj but Regi, who was alarmed earlier, ran to Rajauri and joined Kaji. Both of the Chak chiefs attacked the forces of Mirza Haidar multiple times but were defeated and forced to retreat. In one of his campaign, on a Friday, 12 September 1544, Kaji Shah Chak, who was at Thanna, died of fever. This shocked the Chaks as Kaji was the sole experienced strength which bound the Chaks together. Regi Khan Chak continued his warfare but he too was killed by a force sent by Mirza Haidar in 1546. This disheartened the Chaks who went into a political and martial abyss until Ghazi and Daulat took over the leadership.

== Architecture ==
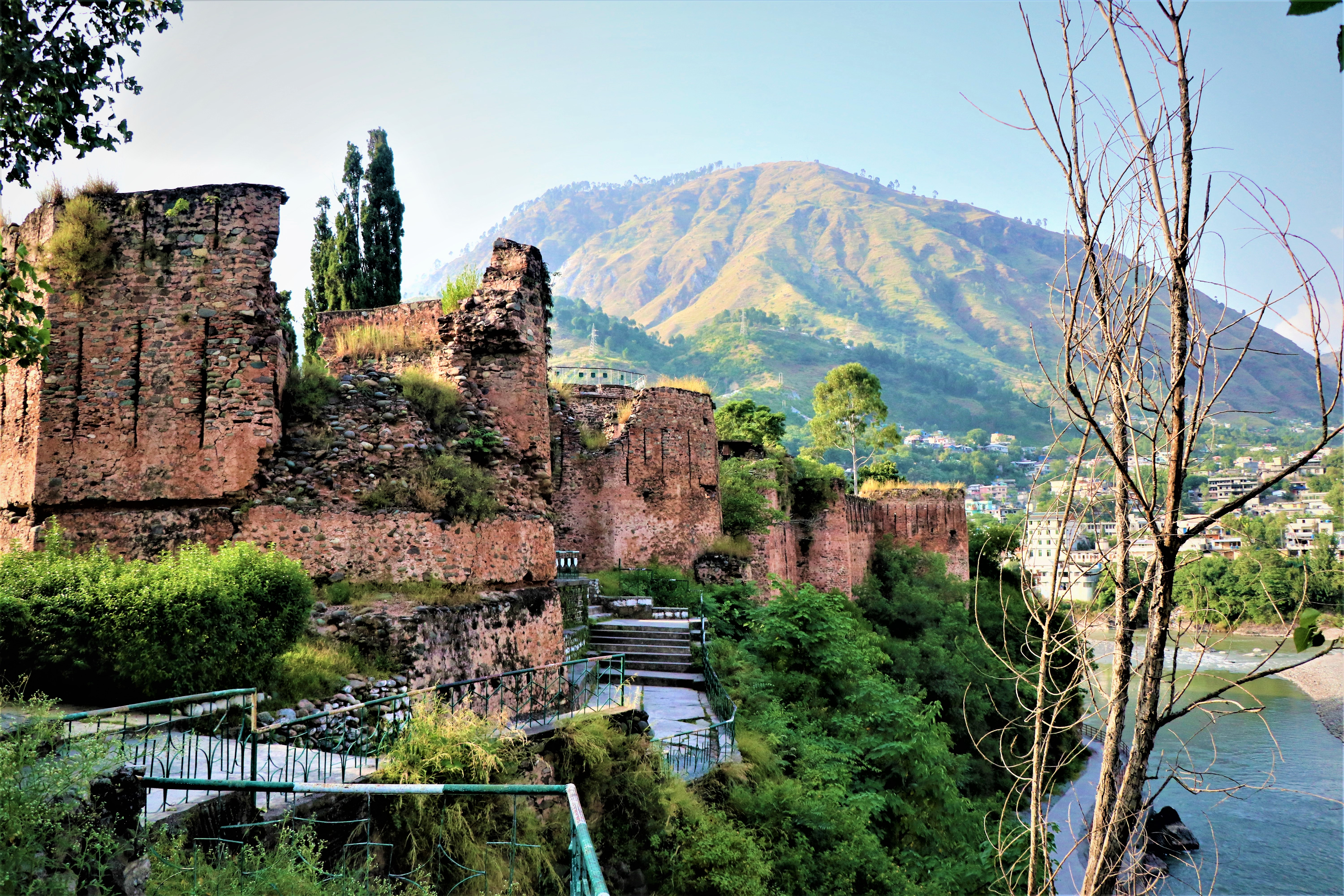
Red Fort, Muzaffarabad, Azad Kashmir.

The Chak Sultans, particularly Husain Shah Chak patronized many construction projects but due to their political instability and constant threats from the Mughals, their architectural expertise was much restricted. Ghulam Hasan Khuyehami, a Kashmiri author, in his book Tareekh i Hasan, says:

Husain Shah Chak, built a garden near the Shrine of Moinu-Din Naqashbandi at Nawhatta. The garden was adorned with fountains and a single chute fed up by Laschama-Canal. The famous Chak ruler, Yousuf Shah-i-Chak built another garden with thirteen terraces from Fatah kadal to Dal Hasan yar, with a variety of flower and fruit trees in it.

— Peer Ghulam Hasan Khuyehami, Tareekh i Hasan, Vol I

Some of the architectural projects commissioned by the Chak dynasty in Kashmir include:

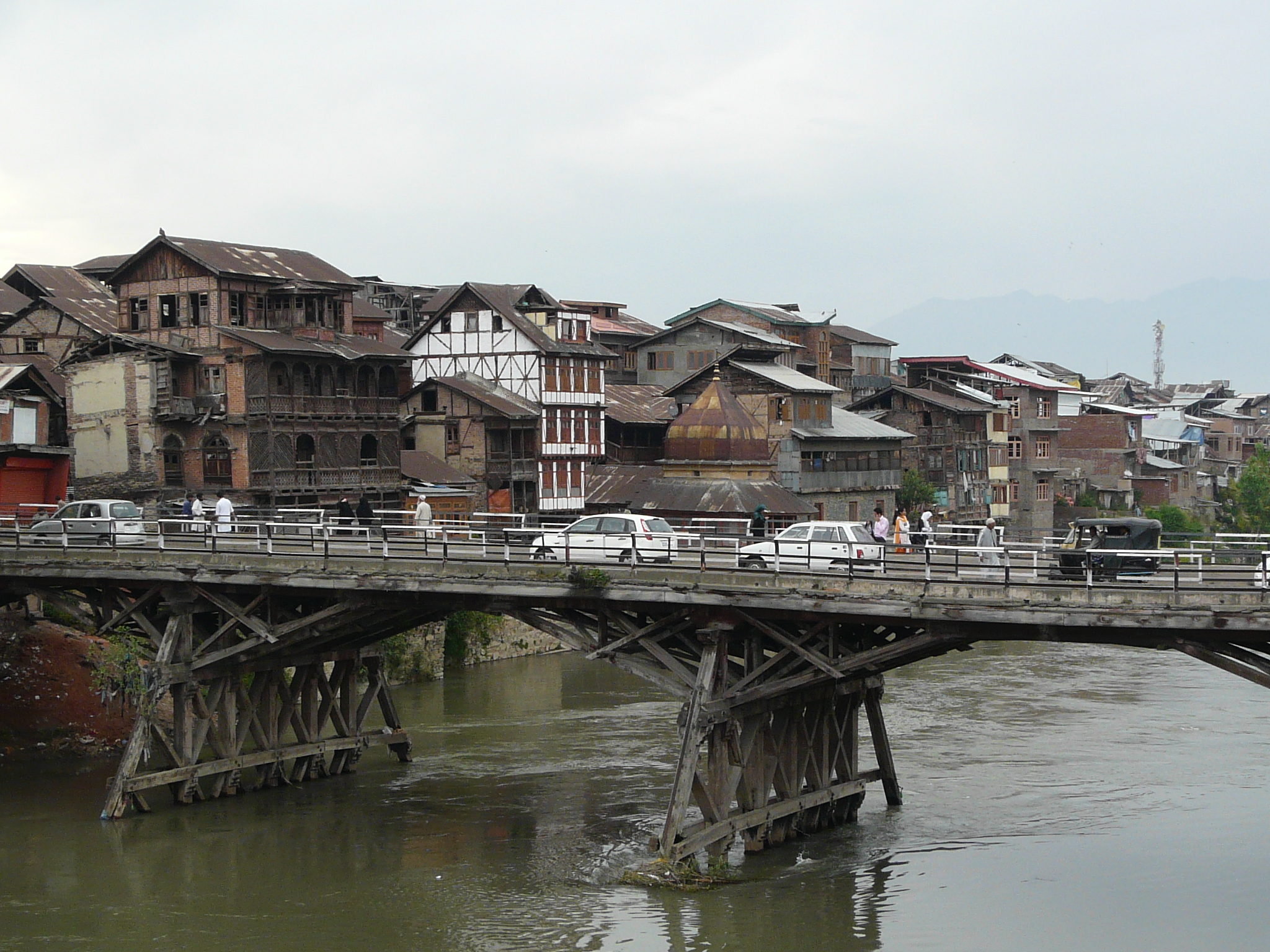
Habba Kadal Bridge, Srinagar, Jammu and Kashmir.

== List of rulers ==
Titular Name	Personal Name	Reign
Muḥammad Humāyūn محمد ہمایوں	Ghazi Shah غازی شاہ چَک	1561–1563
Nasiru'd-Din ناصرالدین	Husain Shah حُسین شاہ چَک	1563–1570
Zahīru'd-Din Muhammad Alī ظہیرالدین محمد علی	Ali Shah عَلی شاہ چَک	1570–1578
Nasiru'd-Din Ghazi ناصرالدین غازی	Yousuf Shah (1) یُوسُفْ شاہ چَک	1578–1579
Sayyid Mubarak of Baihaqi dynasty was enthroned in 1579
Lohar Ghazi لوہر غازی	Lohar Khan لوہر خان چَک	1579–1580
Nasiru'd-Din Ghazi ناصرالدین غازی	Yousuf Shah (2) یُوسُفْ شاہ چَک	1580–1586
Ismā'īl Shah اسماعیل شاہ	Yakub Shah یَعقوب شاہ چَک	1586–1589

- Yakub Shah was dethroned on 14 October 1586 by the Mughals but continued to use the title of the Sultan of Kashmir till 1589.

== Religion ==
The Chak dynasty was the first Shi‘a dynasty to rule over any part of northern India. It is also considered to be one of the eight Shia dynasties of medieval India. The other seven includes Adil Shahi dynasty of Bijapur Sultanate, Nizam Shahi dynasty of Ahmednagar Sultanate, Qutb Shahi dynasty of Golconda Sultanate, Malik dynasty of Makran Sultanate, Maqpon dynasty of Baltistan, Trakhan dynasty of Gilgit and Turi dynasty of Kurram Valley. The rulers of the dynasty played a significant role in spreading Shi'ism.

== See also ==
- List of Monarchs of Kashmir
