= Mughal conquest of Kashmir =

1585–1589 Mughal military campaign

- Part of the Mughal Conquests
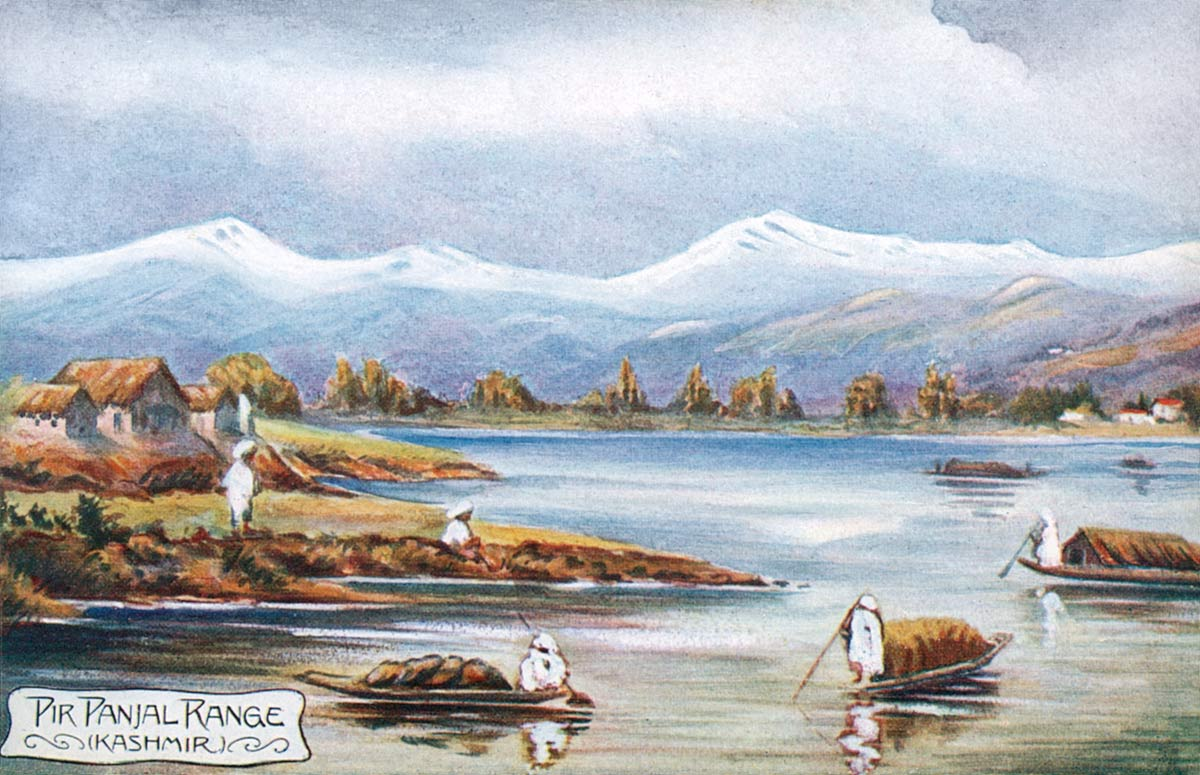
- The Pir Panjal was a frequent battleground for the conflicting forces
Date	20 December 1585 – 8 August 1589 (3 years, 7 months, 2 weeks and 5 days)
Location	Present-day states of Jammu and Kashmir (India) and Azad Kashmir (Pakistan)
Result	Mughal victory
Territorial changes	Annexation of Kashmir Valley

Belligerents
Mughal Empire; Supported by: Maqpon Kingdom	Kashmir Sultanate; Supported by: Kishtwar Kingdom

Commanders and leaders
Bhagwant Das; Shah Quli Mahram; Qasim Khan	Yousuf Shah Chak (surrendered); Yakub Shah Chak (surrendered); Shams Chak (surrendered); Yaqub Sarfi

Strength
Bhagwant Das: 20,000–25,000 infantry 5,000 musketeer 5,000 cavalry Mirza Shah Rukh: 20,000 Qasim Khan: 15,000 infantry 5,000–6,000 cavalry 2,000 musketeer Yusuf Khan Rizvi: 20,000	Buliasa Pass: 25,000 infantry 15,000 cavalry 7,000 musketeer Battle of Hastivanj: 5,000–10,000 infantry 2,000 musketeer Hanjik Fort: 30,000 infantry 10,000 cavalry 5,000–10,000 musketeer

Casualties and losses
Low (at Buliasa); Heavy (at Hastivanj); Heavy (at Hanjik)	Low to Medium (at Buliasa); Heavy (at Hastivanj); Low (at Hanjik)

The Mughal conquest of Kashmir (Note: Persian: فتح کشمیر توسط مغول ها) was an invasion of the Kashmir Sultanate by the Mughal Empire in 1585–1589. After severe fighting and heavy casualties, the Mughals defeated the Kashmiris in the Battle of Hastivanj (10 October 1586).

== Background ==
By the end of 1585, Akbar was free enough to seriously plan the conquest of Kashmir. The Mughal rulers had long admired Kashmir for its cool climate, flowing streams, and charming gardens. Previously, Babur had attempted a small expedition into the region without success, and Mirza Haidar had advised Humayun to take control of Kashmir as a strategic base—indeed, Mirza Haidar ruled there for about ten years in the mid-1500s.

In 1559, Ghazi Khan, who was effectively managing Kashmir, sent his envoy Nusrat Chak to Akbar in hopes of establishing friendly ties. However, when Akbar’s guardian, Bairam Khan, dispatched an army under Mirza Qara Bahadur the following year, the Mughal forces were soundly defeated by Ghazi Khan’s troops near Rajaorl. Following this setback, Akbar postponed his plans while continuing to maintain contact with the local rulers.

In 1568, his ambassadors Mirza Munim and Yakub Shah Chak visited Husain Shah’s court, where—despite some awkward interference in local affairs by Mirza Muqim—they were treated with respect. Husain Shah even sent his daughter as a gesture of goodwill, but Akbar rejected her. Later, in 1578, Akbar sent envoys to the court of Ali Shah Chak, Husain Shah’s successor. During this visit, local rituals such as the reading of the khutba and the minting of coins in Akbar’s name were observed, and Ali Shah also sent valuable gifts along with a princess for Prince Salim.

Then, in January 1580, Yousuf Shah Chak, the son of Ali Shah, fled to Akbar for safety after being overthrown by his cousin Lohar Chakk. Soon after, Akbar ordered Raja Man Singh and Mirza Yousuf Shah to help Yusuf regain his throne. However, when local nobles warned Yusuf that Mughal assistance might not be welcome, he decided to return to Kashmir on his own. With the support of his followers, he defeated Lohar Chakk in November 1580 and recovered his kingdom without any Mughal help, leaving Akbar without a strong reason to intervene further in Kashmir.

== Conquest ==
In late 1581, after a successful Kabul campaign, Akbar sent envoys Mirza Tahir and Salih Aqil from Jalalabad to Kashmir. Yousuf Shah Chak welcomed them warmly and sent his third son, Haidar Khan, to spend a year at Akbar’s court. Three years later, at Akbar’s request, Yousuf Shah sent his eldest son Ya‘qub, who arrived on 10 February 1585. However, Yakub soon grew suspicious of Akbar’s intentions and returned to Kashmir. In October, Akbar sent Hakim ‘All and Baha-ud-din from Kalanaur to summon Yusuf or to have Ya‘qub sent back. By December, while Akbar was camped at Hasan Abdal, the envoys returned without any news of Yousuf or his son.

As a result, on 31 December 1585, an army led by Mirza Shah Rukh and Raja Bhagwant Das, with 5,000 cavalry, was dispatched to Kashmir. They advanced via the Pakhli route and reached the Buliyan Pass, about fifty miles west of Baramula, only to find that Yusuf had blocked the way. Due to harsh cold, a shortage of supplies, and bad weather, the Mughal forces opted to negotiate. On 24 February 1586, Yousuf met Raja Bhagwant Das and agreed to submit to Akbar, although his son Ya‘qub and some local nobles resisted. The Kashmiris were defeated at the Kuarmat Pass by Madhu Singh, the son of Raja Bhagwant Das, and were forced to agree to terms that required minting coins and reciting the khutba in Akbar’s name, while key economic resources were placed under Mughal control. When news of the defeat reached the Mughal leaders, they accepted the agreement, and Yousuf Shah was taken to Akbar at Attock on 7 April 1586.

Later, however, Akbar rejected the treaty, imprisoned Yousuf Shah, and handed him over to Raja Todar Mal despite earlier promises of safe conduct—a betrayal that tarnished his reputation.

== Aftermath ==
After its annexation by the Mughal Empire, Kashmir soon became troubled. During his first visit to the province in 1589, Akbar had put in place the necessary administrative arrangements. However, high revenue assessments caused widespread discontent. The locals chose Yadgar, the cousin of Governor Mirza Yousuf Shah Chak, as their leader. Yadgar declared independent authority and even began minting coins in his own name. In July 1592, Akbar left Lahore for Kashmir, stopping at Bhimbar where he received the head of Yadgar, who had been captured and executed. On 14 October, he entered Srinagar. When Mirza Yousuf Khan resigned due to difficulties with revenue administration, the entire province was made into reserved lands. Around five years later, in 1597, Akbar made his third and final visit to Kashmir.
