= Yakub Shah Chak =

Sultan of Kashmir from 1586 to 1589

- Sultan of Kashmir; Ismā'īl Shah

Sultan of Kashmir
- Reign: 14 February 1586 – 14 October 1586 (Note: Yakub continued to retain the title until 8 August 1589)
- Predecessor: Yousuf Shah Chak
- Successor: Office abolished (Qasim Khan as Mughal Faujdar of Kashmir Sarkar)
- Born: Ya'qūb (Yākūb) Shāh Chak c. 1565
- Died: October 1593 (aged 27–28); Biswak, Bihar, Mughal Empire (present-day Biswak, Bihar, India)
- Consort: Sankar Devi
- Dynasty: Chak dynasty
- Father: Yousuf Shah Chak
- Religion: Shia Islam

Ya'qūb (Yākūb) Shāh Chak (Persian: یعقوب شاہ چک) was the sixth and the last Chak Sultan of Kashmir Sultanate, who reigned from 1586 to 1589. Yakub succeeded his father Yousuf Shah Chak, under warlike conditions, after Kashmir was invaded by the Mughal forces in late 1585.

The aggressive Yakub firmly established a well-built resistance to foreign invasions. His authority and influence were felt over all of the Northern India, especially in the kingdoms of the Western Himalayas. After the Mughal forces invaded Kashmir, Yakub adopted a different policy than the one he adopted after he ascended to the throne in 1586. He gathered all his local enemies, including his rivals, and asked them to unite for victory against the Mughals. Though he was found crippled and defeated, he is still regarded as a bold and powerful King of Kashmir. After his defeat, Kashmir was captured by the Mughals and made into a district and, later on, an imperial province of the Mughal Empire. Qasim Khan was assigned as the first Mughal Faujdar of Kashmir Sarkar on 15 October 1586.

== Early life ==
Yakub Shah Chak was the eldest son of Yousuf Shah Chak (né Yoūsuf Shāh Chak), the fourth and sixth Chak Sultan. He was an Orthodox Shia. Yakub Shah is said to have been short-tempered, harsh, and intolerant towards those who didn't agree with him. His grandfather, Ali Shah Chak married him to Sankar Devi, the daughter of Raja Bahadur Singh of Kishtwar.

== Relations with Akbar ==
When Mughal Emperor Akbar ordered Yakub's father, Yousuf Shah, to appear in his court, he sent Yakub to Akbar's court in Fatehpur Sikri with Timur Beg, the Mughal ambassador to Kashmir. Akbar, despite Yousuf's attempt to please him through his best means, was displeased as Yousuf evaded his orders not once but twice. Yakub stayed in touch with his father and informed him of Akbar's plan regarding Kashmir. Although Yakub was in safe hands, as promised by Timur Beg, Yousuf's political stance towards the Mughal could greatly affect Akbar's treatment of Yakub.

While Yousuf was still under discussion with his ministers on the Mughal envoys sent by Akbar, Yakub unexpectedly appeared in Srinagar. Having escaped the imperial Mughal camp in Khawaspur, Punjab, he took the Rajauri route to enter Srinagar. Yakub was unhappy after Akbar's hostile attitude towards him, calling him wicked and mad and giving him a meager allowance of only thirty to forty rupees. Yousuf, worried with the fear of Mughal advancement, was furious over Yakub's action and wanted to imprison and punish him but was forcibly stopped by his ministers.

=== Resistance towards first Mughal Invasion ===
After the Mughal envoys sent by Akbar failed to cooperate with the Sultanate, Yousuf stayed back. Akbar, enraged, ordered Raja Bhagwant Das, the Governor of Amber and Lahore, to invade Kashmir. Bhagwant Das set out from Attock with 5000 horses accompanied by Mirza Shah Rukh and Shah Quli Mahram. To repulse this Invasion, Yousuf organised his army. The right guard of the army was commanded by Yakub and Abul Ma'ali.

The belligerents met at Buliasa Pass. Although the clash went in the favour of Kashmiris, Yousuf held talks with the envoys and after a whole night of discussion was convinced that further resistance would be useless and after cheering up the inhabitants and soldiers in various villages and posts, left his camp with a few horsemen to the Mughal camp on 14 February 1586.

== Reign ==
Abandoned by his father, Yakub ascended the throne on 14 February 1586 with the consent of Kashmiri ministers and nobles and officially adopted the title Isma'īl Shah for himself after Shah Ismail of Iran.

=== Struggle against Mughal forces ===
As the Mughal forces suffered in heavy snowfall and the scarcity of food and resources, Kashmiri commanders inflicted great loss upon the invaders. Seeing the disintegration of his forces, Bhagwant Das started to make peace talks with Sultan Yakub by sending Mirza Akbar Shahi to him. Both the sides agreed on ending hostilities towards each other. On the other hand, Yousuf agreed on different terms with Bhagwant Das. The terms included that the coins should be struck and the Khutba recited in the name of Emperor Akbar; Yousuf would retain his throne, but the major administrative positions would be held by the Mughals. Other than this, Yousuf's primary duty was to dethrone Yakub and place him in the court of Akbar. This treaty marked the end of the first Mughal invasion as the Mughal forces withdrew from Kashmir. Yousuf was presented to Akbar but was imprisoned on his orders, violating the treaty. This treaty was not approved by Yakub and the nobles. Yakub and his followers had coins struck and Khutba read in Yakub's name.

=== Relationship with his Sunni subjects, rebellion ===
Yakub was a Shia and held antagonistic views towards Sunnis. He sent Mulla Aini to Qazi Syed Musa Shah, a Sunni Imam, to add the name of Caliph Ali in every public prayer. Qazi Musa advised Yakub to focus more on public and executive matters rather than indulging in the affairs of the Mosque. This angered Yakub and he verbally abused Qazi Musa. After suppressing a revolt prompted by Yakub's sectarian views, Yakub held Qazi Musa's disobedience responsible for the revolt and again started to oppress him over the matter of adding Caliph Ali's name in the public prayers. Qazi Musa again dismissed the Sultan's wish. This time, Sultan Yakub ordered the execution of Qazi Musa which terrorized Sunnis. After repelling the Mughal forces, Yakub neglected the advice of his ministers and counsellors. Despite warnings, he left the routes entering Kashmir undefended and appointed Ali Dar, an incompetent and allegedly alcoholic minister, to the post of Wazir (prime minister), against the ministers' advice, responsible for handling the affairs of the Sultanate.

The Sunni Chak chief, Shams Khan Chak, along with other chiefs including Malik Hasan Chadura, Alam Sher Magre, and the Wazir Ali Dar, progressed to Lahore to seek Emperor Akbar's help regarding Yakub's oppressive policy towards the minority. Along the journey, Malik Hasan suggested that the monsoon season was going to commence, so they should rather attack and occupy Srinagar themselves as Yakub was away on an administrative tour. Yakub, after hearing this news, immediately appointed Muhammad Bhat, a former Wazir during his father's reign, as his Wazir. He reached Srinagar before the rebels and organised his army. Both sides met in Srinagar and, after a fierce clash, concluded with the help of Shaikh Hasan and Baba Khalil. The rebels were given the Kamraz province with the seat in Sopore. Shams Chak and Hasan Chadura wanted to kill Baba Khalil and Shaikh Hasan, who were accompanying them, but were stopped by Malik Hasan, who sent them back to the capital safely. This angered Yakub, who set off with a large army and defeated the rebels in Sopore and imprisoned Shams Chak.

=== Resistance towards second Mughal invasion ===
Yakub held Qazi Musa accountable for the recent rebellion and, after he refused to compute Caliph Ali's name in the public prayers, ordered his execution. This communique spread like fire, especially in Sunni majority areas that felt insecure under the Sultan's policies. Yakub retired Muhammad Bhat off his position and imprisoned him, appointing Nazuk Dar, who was incapable and inexperienced in handling the external and internal affairs. These were one of the many reasons for the Mughal annexation of Kashmir.

Shaykh Yakub Sarfi, a cousin of Baba Daud Khaki, proceeded to the court of Akbar and requested him to invade and annex Kashmir under a favourable agreement. Akbar, while disregarding the previous treaty between Bhagwant Das and Yousuf Shah, accepted the agreement and sent an army under Mirza Shah Rukh. Still, the latter was decisively defeated by the Kashmiri forces. He was more concerned about his return to India rather than focusing on the annexation of Kashmir. After this humiliating defeat, Akbar relieved him of his command.

This defeat did not deter the Mughals from invading the valley. Akbar appointed Qasim Khan under a new and well-organised army with Mirza Akbar Shahi and Fath Khan as commanders and Yakub Sarfi and Haider Chak, a cousin of Sultan Yakub, as guides. Qasim Khan set out from Lahore on 28 June 1586 and through the defile of Bhimber reached Rajauri. The Kashmiri commanders appointed for the defence of Rajauri route deserted and joined the invaders. Yakub, after learning of these sudden advancements, set out from Srinagar and camped at Hirpora to face the Mughals.

Yakub sent a force under Bahadur Chak and Naurang Chak, but Bahadur Chak deserted to the Mughals in Kapartal Pass and imprisoned Naurang Chak who was later saved. Many soldiers and commanders who were either demoralized seeing the mighty Mughal forces or held grudges against Yakub for his policies left the Kashmiri forces and joined the Mughals. Other Kashmiri commanders, including Yusuf Khan Chak, Aiba Khan Chak, and Sayyid Mubarak, found it impossible to stop the advancing Mughal forces and returned to Hirpora to the Kashmiri camp. Yakub was so disheartened and discouraged after seeing these poor developments that he left Hirpora and retired to Kishtwar, which his father-in-law ruled as a tributary state of Kashmir.

The deserted chiefs, seeing Yakub's departure and defeat, regretted their actions and betrayed the Mughals. Seeing the chaos, Shams Chak and Muhammad Bhat escaped the prison and took charge of the Kashmiri defence in Yakub's absence. While Yakub was under the Raja of Kishtwar's protection, Shams Chak and Husain Chak, another cousin of Sultan Yakub, fought for the throne. Both the Mughals and Kashmiris met at Hastivanj on 10 October 1586 for a last decisive battle. At first, the Kashmiris were leading in the battlefield, but after Muhammad Qasim Nayak, his son Zafar Nayak, and Muhammad Chak (son of Shams Chak), were killed in a sudden attack, the Kashmiri forces, dispersed and crumbled, fled, pursued by the Mughals. With this victory, the Mughals under Yadgar Hussain entered Srinagar on 14 October 1586 and had the khutba read in the name of Emperor Akbar, thus ending the short-lived Chak Sultanate. Qasim Khan entered Srinagar the next day and the conquest of Kashmir officially ended on 15 October 1586.

== Resistance after the Mughal conquest ==
=== First return to battlefield ===
The Raja of Kishtwar criticised Yakub for his cowardice in not facing the Mughals himself. Yakub set out from Kishtwar with a small following and to regain his throne and Sultanate from the Mughals, he established himself at Chanderkot with Abul Ma'ali. In a short period of time, his forces expanded to about 8,000 horses. Meanwhile, Shams Chak settled in Sopore with a total of 3,000 horses and 7,000 foot and gained the support of Husain Chak. The three Chak chiefs adopted the guerrilla tactics and started to confront the Mughals in surprise attacks and cut down their resources.

=== First encounter with the Mughals ===
After a month and half of these attacks, which caused the Mughals and Qasim Khan great loss, Qasim Khan decided to attack Yakub. But after reaching Yakub's camp he was informed that Yakub had left for Srinagar. Qasim Khan sent a force under Muhammad Ali against Yakub, who was waiting for him just outside Srinagar in the south-east of the city. Yakub went for an attack and defeated Muhammad Ali. This greatly encouraged Yakub, who attacked the west side of the city and set many houses at fire, including the palace in which Qasim Khan was residing. Qasim Khan left the palace and camped at the garden of Muhammad Khan Naji. He started to organise resistance and even had Haider Chak executed in fear of him joining the opposition. Kashmiris, infuriated after hearing this news, attacked and killed every Mughal they found in the streets and corners.

Yakub lost his distinction in front of the Kashmiri forces after he ordered the execution of Husain Chak, who was one of the main contenders for the throne and was even appointed as Sultan by his supporters. This affected Yakub's strategical stance as his soldiers left the battlefield. Qasim Khan, on the other hand, having received reinforcement from Muhammad Khan, confronted Yakub, who lost and fled the battlefield with his forces, pursued by Akbar Shahi.

=== Second return to battlefield ===
Although Yakub fled to Kishtwar, the resistance continued under Shams Chak but this time against Mughals, who had the upper hand in the battlefield. Fighting ceased for two months as winter approached and in late 1587, Yakub returned from Kishtwar and camped in a hill in the Vular Pargana (Pulwama). Shams Chak, who fled to Karnah, returned as well and settled in Sopore. The Mughals and Kashmiris had daily skirmishes with no decisive result.

=== Second encounter with the Mughals ===
In early 1588, Qasim Khan despatched a force under Mirza Ali Khan and other Mughal commanders. They met Yakub at Gusu and faced an embarrassing defeat due to heavy snowfall and the Kashmiri tactics. Mirza Ali Khan was killed while his men were either killed, taken prisoners or fled to Qasim Khan. Humiliated by this defeat, Qasim Khan, on the very next day, set out to confront Yaqub himself in the Takht-i-Sulaiman. The Kashmiris were again close to leading the battle in their favour but unfortunately for them, Yakub's sipahsalar (commander-in-chief) was killed by an arrow that pierced his eye. This demoralised the Kashmiris which led to their defeat. Even though this defeat affected the structure of the Kashmiri forces, Yakub was still bold enough to organise his army once more. Realizing that he alone could not defeat the well-assembled Mughal army, Yakub initiated peace talks with Shams Chak. He requested that Shams forget about their past and unite against the common enemy, the Mughal invaders. With the positive and advantageous response of Shams, Yakub joined him with Malik Hasan and his forces in the Hanjik Fort where Shams was residing. Both chiefs laid a joint attack on the Mughals near Hanjik. The Mughals were resolutely defeated and lost 1,500 of their men while the rest were pursued by Malik Hasan to the Zialdakar fields.

With the aftermath of this battle, Yakub and Shams managed to capture Koh-i-Maran and stationed their forces. The Kashmiris and the Mughals had daily skirmishes for two months in which the Kashmiris dominated the Mughals. The situation became so intense for the Mughals that Qasim Khan requested Emperor Akbar for his recall. Akbar, after seeing the deteriorating circumstances in the Mughal's authority in Kashmir, replaced Qasim Khan with Yusuf Rizvi, a Sayyid commander from Mashhad, Iran. Yusuf Rizvi set out from Lahore along with Baba Khalil, Talib Isfahani and Muhammad Bhat, who had surrendered to the Mughals earlier, as guides in the middle of 1588. Yakub sent Shams Chak's brother Lohar Chak to prevent them from entering Kashmir but the latter being a friend of Baba Khalil, joined them instead. This alarmed the Kashmiri defences as the chiefs joined the Mughals or fled to the nearby hills. Yakub went away to Kishtwar while Shams departed to Bring Pargana.

=== Third return to battlefield ===
Yakub returned from Kishtwar and settled in Panjyari, Dechhin Khawarah near Baramulla, while Shams Chak established himself in the hills of Kamraj (Anantnag). Yakub was determined that even if the Kashmiri army is disintegrated by the Mughal domination, the spirit to fend off foreign invasions and to protect the motherland should not be diminished in any circumstances.

=== Third and Last encounter with the Mughals ===
After taking command and establishing the Mughal bureaus throughout Kashmir, Yusuf Rizvi sent Muhammad Bhat and Haji Miraki against Yakub. The Mughal commanders sent a messenger to Yakub to submit to the Mughal dominance, but Yakub, upon Abul Ma'ali's advice, rejected it and marched against them. Yakub defeated the advance-guard led by Muhammad Mir, but both sides had to stop their advancements as heavy rain interfered. After the battle went indecisive, Yakub retired to Vular Pargana to reorganise his exhausted army. But due to his ill-fate, he found treachery and disloyalty in the men as they joined the Mughal forces in great number. Yakub showed no resistance to the advancing forces of Muhammad Bhat and Muhammad Mir and left for Kishtwar while Abul Ma'ali, who put up a little fight was defeated, imprisoned and taken to Cherar, Budgam.

Seeing the declining conditions of the Kashmiri resistance, Shams Chak was convinced that defeating and preventing the Mughals was practically impossible now, as the Mughals had conquered almost all of Kashmir. He surrendered to the Mughal forces after the mediation of Sayyid Baha'ud-Din. Akbar arrived in Kashmir in early June 1589, Yakub returned from Kishtwar, and on 8 August 1589, surrendered to the Mughals by paying personal homage to Emperor Akbar.

== Later life and death ==
After paying personal homage to the Emperor and the new Sultan of his Sultanate, Yakub was sent with Hasan Mirza Beg to Raja Man Singh, the Mughal governor of Bengal, Bihar, Odisha and Jharkhand and the son of Bhagwant Das, at Rohtas, Bihar. During the journey, Yakub, with his brother Ibrahim Chak and his followers, hatched a plot to assassinate Hasan Beg and escape. The Mughal guard got wind of the plan and killed Ibrahim as he was approaching to kill Hasan Beg, who pardoned Yakub after he repented for his role in the assassination attempt.

Yakub was safely transferred to the residence of his father in Jaunpur. After taking a letter of guarantee from Yousuf, Hasan Beg sent Yakub to Raja Man Singh in Rohtas where Yakub was imprisoned. After Yousuf's death in 1592, Man Singh transferred Yousuf's rank to Yakub and allowed him to settle down in the jagir of Yousuf. Before leaving Rohtas, Yakub met Qasim Khan who presented him with a poisoned betel leaf (paan). Yakub ate it. By the time he reached Behira was seriously ill and died in the month of Muharram in October 1593.

== Bibliography ==
- Aḥmad, Khwājah Niẓāmuddin (2015). The Ṭabaqāt-i-Akbarī of Khwājah Niẓāmuddīn Aḥmad : a history of India from the early Musalmān invasions to the thirty-sixth year of the reign of Akbar. Vol. III. Translated by De, Brajendranath. Kolkata: The Asiatic Society. ISBN 978-93-81574-33-1. OCLC 935461267.
- Badāʾūnī, ʿAbd-al-Qādir (1884). Muntakhab-ut-táwaríkh. Vol. II. Baptist Mission Press.
- Hasan, Mohibbul. Kashmir under the Sultans. OCLC 844529832.
- Ibn-Mubārak, Abu-'l-Faḍl (1989). The Akbar nama. Vol. III. Atlantic Publishing. OCLC 1075953965.
- Ibn-Mubārak, Abu-'l-Faḍl (1897–1903). The Akbarnama of Abu'l Fazl. Vol. III. The Asiatic Society of Bengal. OCLC 836291193.
- ibn Mubārak, Abū al-Faz̤l (2002). The Akbar nama of Abu-l-Fazl. Vol. III. Low Price Publications. ISBN 81-7536-294-4. OCLC 57569957.
- Malik, Haidar (1991). Bano, Razia (ed.). History of Kashmir (in English and Persian). Translated by Bano, Razia. Delhi: Bhavna Prakashan. OCLC 231642495.
- Malik, Haidar (2013). History of Kashmir. Srinagar: Jay Kay Books. ISBN 978-81-87221-84-5. OCLC 825179763.
- Malik, Haidar (2016). Bano, Razia (ed.). History of Kashmir (in English and Persian). Translated by Bano, Razia. Srinagar: Jay Kay Books. ASIN B072R1R3H6.
- Pandita, Kashi Nath (2013). Baharistan-i-shahi : a chronicle of mediaeval Kashmir. Gulshan Books. ISBN 978-81-8339-166-5. OCLC 864282833.
- Pandita, Kashi Nath (2022). Baharistan-i-shahi : a chronicle of mediaeval Kashmir. New Delhi: Akshaya Prakashan. ISBN 9788188643837. OCLC 1343198078.
- Wani, Aijaz Ashraf (2016). "Ethnic identities and the dynamics of regional and sub-regional assertions in Jammu and Kashmir". In Yu-Wen Chen; Chih-yu Shih (eds.). Borderland Politics in Northern India. Routledge. pp. 37–69. ISBN 978-1-317-60517-1.
