= Husain Shah Chak =

Sultan of Kashmir from 1563 to 1570

- Nasiru'd-Din Padishah Ghazi; Nūshīravān i Kashmīr; Sulṭān i Kashmīr

20th Sultan of Kashmir
- Reign: 1563 – 1570
- Predecessor: Ghazi Shah Chak
- Successor: Ali Shah Chak
- Died: 1571; Zainapur, Kashmir Sultanate (present-day Kulgam, Jammu and Kashmir, India)
Names
- Husain Shah Chak
Posthumous name
- Nūshīravān i Ādil (lit. Nushiravan the Just)
- Dynasty: Chak
- Father: Hussain Khan Chak
- Religion: Shia Islam

Husain (Persian: حُسین, romanized: Ḥusaīn, lit. 'handsome'; Persian pronunciation: [hu.ˈsajn]), born Ḥusaīn Shāh Chak (Persian: حُسین شاہ چَک) was the second Chak Sultan who ruled over the Kashmir sultanate. He succeeded his brother Ghazi Shah Chak after Ghazi abdicated the throne in Husain's favour in 1563. Husain was the 20th Sultan of Kashmir and ruled Kashmir until 1570.

He served as a general under his father Hussain Khan and then under his elder brother Ghazi Shah. Husain gradually increased his power throughout the Valley and extended his realm to the hill states of Jammu, Kishtwar and Rajauri. He adopted policies that were politically, culturally and economically beneficial. Ruling through a centralised system, he made his cabinet of ministers follow strict rules. To establish peace in his Sultanate, he constituted peaceful relationships with foreign authorities. He held co-operative and contributive talks with his subjects. Husain is regarded as the foremost monarch of the Chak dynasty.

== Historiography ==
The majority of the sources are found in Tarikh i Kashmir IV (History of Kashmir), completed in 1620–21 by Haidar Malik Chadurah, a medieval author and an administrator of Kashmir. Information regarding the Chak rulers including Husain are found in Mughal books like Akbarnama, Ain i Akbari and Tuzk i Jahangiri. Other works include Tarikh i Kashmir I, completed in 1579 by Sayyid Ali while Tarikh i Kashmir II was written in 1590 by an unknown author. Tarikh i Kashmir III was completed during the times of Jahangir. It presents a contemporary version of the rest of the books. Baharistan i Shahi ("Spring Orchard of the Royalty"), the finest of Medieval Kashmiri literature on the Sultanate, was written in 1614 as a Persian chronicle of medieval Kashmir. Other histories of Kashmir such as Tarikh i Hassan, Waqiat i Kashmir and Tazkira Mashaikhin i Kashmir are eighteenth and nineteenth century abridgements of the above works.

== Coinage ==
Nasiru'd-Din Muhammad Husain Padshah Ghazi was engraved on a coin with 6.03g weight and dimensions 15 x 16 mm. This coin has a bold style that is unusual in the coinage series of the Kashmir Sultanate.

== Family tree ==
Kaji Shah
Ghazi Shah (r. 1561–1563) | Husain Shah (r. 1563–1570) | Ali Shah (r. 1570–1578) | Abdal Khan
Ibrahim Khan | Yousuf Shah (r. 1578–1579, 1580–1586)
Yaqub Shah (r. 1586–1589)
