= Battle of Hastivanj =

1586 battle of the Mughal conquest of Kashmir

- Part of the Mughal conquest of Kashmir
Date	10 October 1586
Location	Hastivanj Pass, Pir Panjal, Kashmir Sultanate 33.6457°N 74.6314°E
Result	Mughal victory

Belligerents
Mughal Empire	Kashmir Sultanate

Commanders and leaders
Qasim Khan; Yadgar Hussain	Shams Chak; Qasim Nayak; Zafar Nayak; Muhammad Chak

Strength
10,000–20,000 men ~2,000 musketeer	5,000–10,000 infantry 2,000 musketeers

Casualties and losses
Heavy	Heavy
- Location within Jammu and Kashmir

The Battle of Hastivanj (Note: Nāgari: हास्टिवानज़ युद्ध Haastivaanaz Yuddh, Nastaʿlīq: جنگ هستیوانج Jang-i-Hastivaanj) was fought between armies of Mughal Empire under Qasim Khan and Kashmir Sultanate under Shams Chak. It was fought on 10 October 1586 on a mountain ridge known as Hastivanj near modern-day Pir Ki Gali Pass. It resulted in Mughal victory and subsequent annexation of Kashmir into Mughal Empire.

The battle, along with the fall of Srinagar on 14 October 1586, marks the de facto end of the Mughal conquest of Kashmir.

== Principal actors ==
=== Mughal Empire ===
- Qasim Khan Mir Bahr; the commander of troops send to conquer Kashmir on behalf of emperor Akbar. In addition, subsequently the governor of Mughal Kashmir.
- Shaykh Yaqub Sarfi Kashmiri; the Kashmiri noble who had rebelled against the Sultan and accompanied Mughal army into Kashmir.
- Haider Chak; Kashmiri noble turned rebel belonging the same clan as the Sultan. Has had led an unsuccessful rebellion against Yousuf Shah Chak and afterwards joined the service of Raja Man Singh.
- Bahram Nayak, Isma'il Nayak and Shanki Charwar; Guardians and chief conductors of the passes. They were assigned the responsibility of safeguarding the pass of Kunandehbal also called Akrambal. They defected to Mughal camp and as a result, Kashmiri troops abandoned the Akrambal Fort

=== Kashmir Sultanate ===
- Shams Chak; leading commander in the absence of Yakub Shah Chak.
- Nazuk Bhat; Grand Vizier of the Sultanate.
- Hussain Chak; Zafar Khan, Shamsi Dooni, Mohammad Bhat, Alam Sher Khan; military commanders.

== Background ==
=== Mughal ===
Mughals since their establishment in India in 1526 had sought to expand in every direction of the subcontinent. Kashmir was no exception. Consequently, the first annexation attempt undertaken by Mughals was by Mirza Haider Dughlat in 1540. He conquered Kashmir on behalf of Mughal emperor Humayun but he himself ruled the Sultanate with the Shah Miri Sultan appointed as a puppet. Towards the end of his 10-years rule, his position had weakened significantly because of his domestic and religious policies. To strengthen his rule he sought the help of Humayun who was at that time in Kabul. Qara Bahadur was dispatched by him to aide Mirza Haider in 1550. However, the army of Malik Idi Raina defeated Qara Bahadur.

Mughals under the leadership of emperor Akbar sensing an opportunity in dethronement of Yousuf Shah Chak and his subsequent appeal for help in year 1582 once again sent an army under the leadership of Muhammad Ali Akbarshahi and Raja Bhagwant Das to conquer Kashmir. This army was defeated by Yakub Shah Chak near Pakhil.

=== Kashmir ===
Yousuf Shah Chak ascended the throne of Kashmir in 1578. He also appointed Mohammad Bhat his Grand vizier. A lifelong rival of Mohammad Bhat for the high office of Grand vizier Abdal Bhat in conjuncture with Miran Syed Mubarak Khan started a rebellion in the same year. After losing the battle, he resorted to intrigue which eventually led to Yousuf Shah's dethronement. In order to regain his throne Yousuf Shah proceeded to Lahore to seek Mughal aide. However, instead of leading a Mughal army into Kashmir he once again fell for the intrigue of Abdal Bhat and abandoned the Mughal army thus invoking the wrath of Mughal emperor Akbar, which culminated in his eventual Imprisonment and annexation of his Sultanate.

After the abandonment of Mughal army by Yousuf Shah, Mughal emperor resolved to conquer Kashmir. In pursuit of this desire, he sent an army under the command of Muhammad Ali Akbarshahi, Shaykh Yaqub Kashmiri and Haider Chak on 20 December 1585. This army reached Pakhil and on 14 February 1582, the battle of Pakhil got underway. In its aftermath, Yousuf Shah, who had gone with the intention of negotiating with Raja Bhagwant Das, was treacherously imprisoned.

Yakub Shah Chak ascended the throne and proclaimed Ali Bhat as Grand vizier; however, Ali Bhat was given to narcotics and thus proved incompetent for the job. Under these circumstances, the actual authority was assigned to Miran Syed Hussain Khan and Shamsi Dooni. This state of affairs culminated in Ali Bhat's rebellion, which was eventually headed by Shams Chak. The rebellion was crushed and Shams Chak and his comrades were all put to arrest some suffered penal mutilation as well. In the aftermath of rebellion Muhammad Shah was proclaimed Grand vizier, the public pressure was mounted on him to punish Qazi Musa. Qazi Musa was a descendent of the famous Qazi Ibrahim. His family had been dispensers of justice in Kashmir for a very long time. The allegation brought against him were

- Primary role as instigator of rebellion against the Sultan Yaqub Shah
- Collusion with Mughals during their recent invasion of Kashmir.

For these charges, the Qazi Musa was executed. However, it is stated that real reason for his execution was his fame and popularity with the people. This popularity he had achieved by completing the roofing of Jamia Masjid in short time of one year, which other nobles had failed to do. The execution of Qazi Musa caused considerable unrest and agitation among the nobles and the local people of Kashmir. Nobles such as Shams Chak, Malik Muhammad Hasan Chadura, and Ali Sher Magray deserted Yaqub Shah Chak and proceeded towards the Indian mountains. However, Malik Muhammad Hasan dissuaded them from going onwards and turned back to Kashmir where, after seven days of sporadic fighting, Baba Khalil and Shaikh Hasan intervened to stop the fighting between the two groups.

It was decided that the area beyond Sopore to the right bank of river Jhelum would be ceded to the nobles. However, the parties did not stick to the agreement, and Yaqub marched at the head of a formidable force towards Sopore. His opponents did not feel that they were strong enough to resist him. Consequently, the nobles sent emissaries to Mughal court for help against Yakub Shah. After capturing the lands of the nobles, Yakub Shah was at height of his power and did not adhere to the treaty struck with the Mughals in which following were agreed upon.

- The name of Akbar will be mentioned from Pulpits.
- All coins of the Sultanate will bear the name of Akbar.
- The saffron, silk and game will be declared imperial possession.

Finally, the Mughal court with an intention of taking advantage of the ongoing unrest in Kashmir tried to punish Yakub Shah for breaching the treaty. A strong force under the command of Qasim Khan Mir Bahr was dispatched on 28 June 1586.

== March of the Mughal Army ==
In June 1586, Akbar's court decided to send a Strong Army of 40000 strong under the leadership of Qasim Khan. He was to be accompanied by two Kashmiri Nobles turned rebels namely Shaikh Yaqub Sarfi and Haider Chak. These two were to act as guides and help Mughals gather support among local population. Under his command were Mansabdars like Fateh Khan, Masnad Ali, Gujar Khan, Ali Akbarshahi, Shaikh Daulat Khanjari, Shaikh Sikandar Rafiq, Shah Mohammad, Mir Abdur Razzaq Mamuri, Yadgar Hussain, Lal Deo, Sonar Chand, Khawaja Zahir, Padshah Quli Shafaqat, Wali Beg and Hazari Beg. Sharif Sarmadi became the Bakhsi of this force.

This force crossed the defile of Bhimbar on 1 September 1586. From Rajauri onwards the army chose the Kapartal route to reach Kashmir. After a few days, an advance guard of this Force made first contact with Kashmir Army at a place called Kapartal Kotal (Kunandehbal)

== Defense of the Kashmiris ==
Yaqub Shah, on arrival of news of coming Mughal army placed the city under the command of Nazuk Bhat's brother and himself proceeded to Hirpur to lead the campaign against Mughals.

One of his commanders Syed Saif Khan Baihaqi procured robes, horses, and equipment from Nazuk Bhat's brother and joined another commander Alam Sher Khan at the village of Kitchama.

Yaqub Shah made Haripur his Headquarters and took the precautionary measure of deploying commanders like Yusuf Khan, son of Husain Shah, Ibeh Khan, son of Abdal Khan, Ibrahim Khan, son of Miran Syed Mubarak Shah, and others to ensure the safety of Kenchil route (Kapartal according to Mughal Sources). Bahram Nayak, Ismail Nayak and Shanki Charwar who were the chief conductors and protectors of passes along with Naurang Khan originally called Fateh Ali (who earlier had defected to Mughal cause but afterwards fallen out and arrested by Kashmir army) defected to Mughal camp and as a result, the contingent sent to enforce Kenchil had to retreat to Haripur.

To strengthen the position of army after the defection of Nayaks Miran Syed Shah Abu’lMa’ali released Shamsi Chak and Muhammad Bhat from prison and appointed them commanders of centre and rear of the army respectively.

Entrusting the matters to his commander after arranging in the field Yaqub Shah proceeded towards the mountains of Chitar (Kashtwar) next morning.

== Order of battle ==
=== Kunandehbal ===
==== Mughals ====
- Shaikh Yaqub Sarfi: Commander
- Jai Tawachibashi
- Shanki Charwar
- 100 to 200 skirmishers and an unknown number of defectors

==== Kashmir ====
- Mohammad Lang
- Dilawar Khan
- Bahadur Khan
- 100 to 150 Garrison troops and Musketeers
- Contingent of Yusuf Khan, Ibeh Khan and Ibrahim Khan as reinforcement

=== Hastivanj ===
==== Mughals, 40,000 cavalry, 20,000 infantry ====
- Centre: Qasim Khan
- Right wing: Masnad Ali, Fateh Khan, Mubarak Ali
- Left wing: Jalal Khan, Zirkhobi, Khanjari
- Vanguard: Mirza Ali, Akbar Shahi, Gujar Khan, Shaikh Daulat, Sharif Sarmadi

==== Kashmir 5,000 to 6,000 infantry, 100 to 200 cavalry ====
- Centre: Shamsi Chak
- Right wing: Zafar Khan, Mohammad Chak
- Left wing: Shamsi Dooni
- Vanguard: Hussain Chak
- Rear: Jalia and Mohammad Bhat

== Skirmish at Kunandehbal (Akrambal) ==
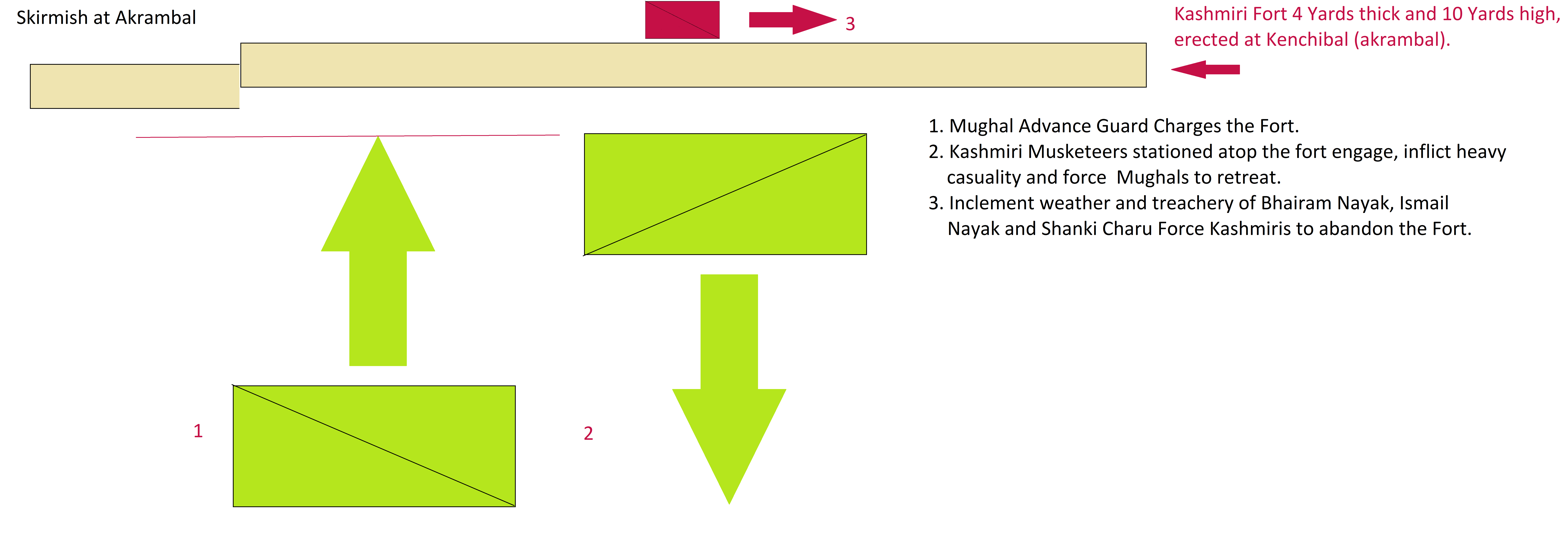
Map of Skirmish at Akrambal

From Rajauri under the command of Yaqub Sarfi and Jai Tawachibashi accompanied by Shanki Charwar an advance guard of few hundred men was sent forward to scout the route and ascertain the condition of road. The advance guard on its arrival at Kunandehbal faced a fort of three walls with each wall with a thickness of 4 yards and height of 10 yards. This fort was garrisoned by Nayaks and their troops and was further reinforced by Mohammad Lung, Dilawar Khan, and Bahadur Khan. The advance guard charged but not only was it repulsed by the Kashmir army but also lost its commanders. Shaikh Yaqub suffered two bullet wounds and Jai Tawachibashi 12. They were both captured and held captive by Shamsi Chak.

Despite the victory the Nayaks defected and joined the Mughal camp. This made the position of Kashmiri contingent guarding the pass precarious and thus they abandoned the fort.

== Battle of Hastivanj ==
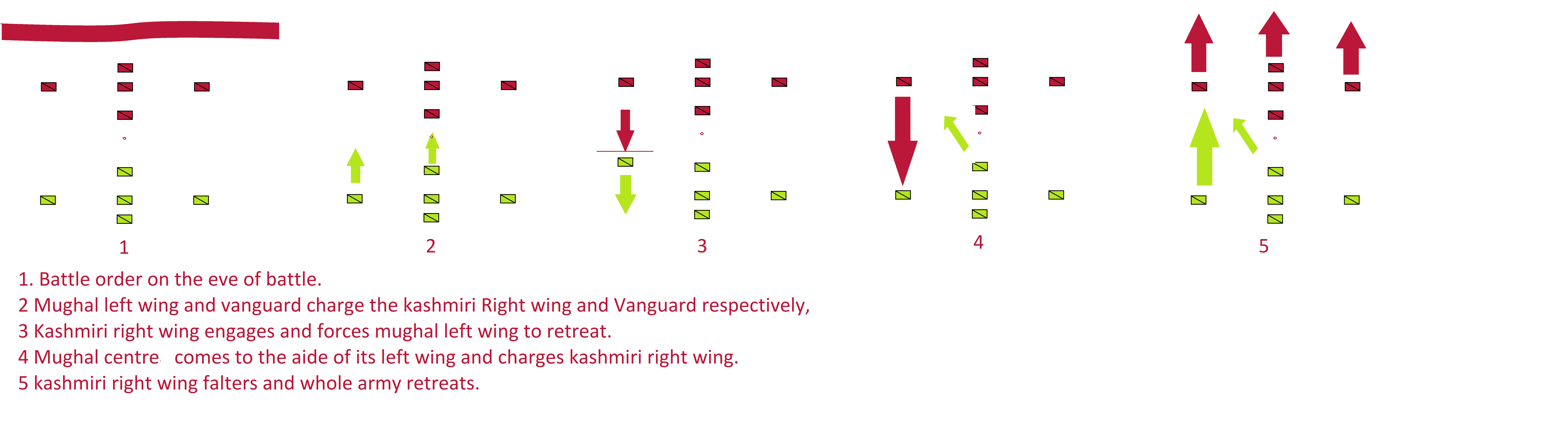
Map of Battle of Hastivanj

On 10 October main body of Mughal troops under the Command of Qasim Khan aimed to cross the Hastivanj ridge. Accordingly, they deployed forces to battle Kashmiri Forces.

First attack was made my Imperial advance guard but it was forced to retreat under the heavy musket fire and shower of stones.

Kashmir army counterattacked with its right and forced the Mughal left to retreat.

Sensing the defeat, Qasim khan pressed his vanguard against Kashmir Right wing.

In the ensuing melee Mohammad Chak from Kashmir right wing was engaged by a Mughal Combatant named Lakha. Both were killed. A bullet of Qanbar Ali a retainer of Mirza hakim shot Zafar Khan Commanding the Kashmir right. and as a result his troops fell back. With their right wing faltering, the Kashmir army's line disintegrated.

Mughal advance guard and left wing made pursuit up to the bottom of the pass.

== Aftermath ==
Yadgar Hussain was immediately sent to the capital city of Srinagar. On 16 October name of Mughal Emperor was read from Pulpit of Jami Masjid. On 25 October 1586, Qasim Khan entered Srinagar as a victorious General of Mughal Army.
