= King Ali =

King Ali may refer to:

- Ali ibn Yusuf (1084–1143), fifth Almoravid king
- Ali Mughayat Syah (died 1530), first sultan of the Kingdom of Aceh Darussalam
- Ali Shah Chak, king of Kashmir from 1570 to 1578
- Ali of Hejaz (1879–1935), King of Hejaz and Grand Sharif of Mecca
- King l.Ali (2006-)King of Kingiye and 9/A,10/A emperor

King Ali (2021-) king of Section B aka king bali

== See also ==
- Ali Raja, the title of the king of the Arakkal Kingdom (1545–1819)
