= Sayyid Mubarak =

Sultan of Kashmir in 1579

Sayyid Mubarak Baihaqi سيد مبارک بیهقی

23rd Sultan of Kashmir
- Reign: February 1579 – November 1579
- Predecessor: Yousuf Shah Chak
- Successor: Lohar Khan Chak
- Born: Kashmir
- Issue: Sayyid Abu'l-Ma'ali Baihaqi; Sayyid Jalal Baihaqi; Sayyid Husain Baihaqi; Sayyid Ibrahim Baihaqi
Names
- Sayyid Mubarak Baihaqi
- House: Baihaqi dynasty
- Religion: Sunni Islam

Sayyid Mubarak Baihaqi (Kashmiri: سيد مبارک بیهقی) was the 23rd Sultan of Kashmir who ascended the throne in February 1579, replacing Yousuf Shah Chak. He was dethroned in November 1579 by Lohar Khan Chak, restoring the Chak dynasty in the monarchy of Kashmir. He also served Ali Shah Chak as his Wazīr which was, after the Sultan, the highest civil office in the Kashmiri government. Sayyid belonged to the Baihaqi family which settled in Kashmir after migrating from Baihaq, in Iran.
