= Lohar Khan =

Sultan of Kashmir from 1579 to 1580

Lohar Khan Chak لوہر خان چک

24th Sultan of Kashmir
- Reign: November 1579 – November 1580
- Predecessor: Sayyid Mubarak
- Successor: Yousuf Shah Chak
- Born: Kashmir
Names
- Lohar Khan Chak
- Dynasty: Chak dynasty
- Father: Shankar Chak
- Religion: Islam

Lohar Khan Chak (Persian: لوہر خان چک) was the 24th Sultan of Kashmir. He, with the help of his Wazīr Abdal Bhat, toppled the government of his predecessor Sayyid Mubarak and ascended the throne in November 1579 thus restoring and becoming the fifth ruler of the Chak dynasty.
