= Yousuf Shah Chak =

Sultan of Kashmir (r. 1578–1579, 1580–1586)

Yousuf Shah Chak يوسف شاہ چک
- Sultan; Nasiru'd-Din Padishah Ghazi; Shah
- Yousuf Shah Chak depicted as the King of Kashmir in the Sinbadnama, c. 1575–1585

22nd Sultan of Kashmir
- 1st Reign: December 1578 – February 1579
- Predecessor: Ali Shah Chak
- Successor: Sayyid Mubarak
- 2nd Reign: November 1580 – 14 February 1586
- Predecessor: Lohar Khan Chak
- Successor: Yakub Shah Chak
- Born: Yusuf Khan c. 1545; Srinagar, Kashmir Sultanate (present-day Srinagar, Jammu and Kashmir, India)
- Died: 22 September 1592 (aged 46–47); Puri, Orissa Subah, Mughal Empire (present-day Puri, Odisha, India)
- Burial: 28 December 1592; Biswak, Bihar, Mughal Empire (present-day Biswak, Bihar, India)
- Consort: Habba Khatoon
- Issue: Yakub Shah Chak; Ibrahim Shah Chak; Haidar Khan Chak
Regnal name
- Al-Sultān al-Āzam Nāsir al-Dunyā wa'l-Dīn Muhammad Yusuf Shāh Bādshāh al-Ghāzī (Note: السلطان الاعظم ناصر الدنیا والدین محمد یوسف شاہ بادشاہ الغازی (lit. 'The Great Sultan, Helper of the World and the Faith, Muhammad Yusuf Shah, the Great Warrior King'))
Posthumous name
- Sultān-ul-Azīm (lit. 'The Most Mighty of the Authority')
- Dynasty: Chak
- Father: Ali Shah Chak
- Religion: Shia Islam (Note: School of Jurisprudence: Ja'fari Order of Sufism: Noorbakshia)

Nasir al-Din Muhammad Yusuf Shah (Persian: ناصر الدین محمد یوسف شاہ), better known as Yousuf Shah Chak (Persian: یوسف شاہ چک) was the fourth Sultan of Kashmir from the Chak dynasty from 1578 to 1579 and then from 1580 to 1586. Yousuf succeeded his father, Ali Shah Chak, who crowned Yousuf before he died. Yousuf defeated all other contenders for the throne, including his uncle Abdal Chak, and ascended the throne in 1578.

Yousuf belonged to the Chak Dynasty. The Chaks were originally Dards who settled in Kashmir in the early 14th century. Most Chaks converted to the Shia branch of Islam from Hinduism. Many during Yousuf's period retained Hindu names such as Shankar, Bhat, Pandu Chak, etc. Yousuf ruled Kashmir for 5 years and 6 months, from 1578 till 1579 and from 1580 till 1586. Yousuf was exiled for a year and 9 months as the rebels occupied his throne after defeating him in the battle of Eidgah. Yousuf was a ferocious fighter, he fought for his people but he lost the respect of his subjects and ministers because of his deficiencies in administration and authority. Nonetheless, Yousuf was said to have ruled justly and to have had a great sense of justice that made him much different than his predecessors. He not only ruled the valley and hills of Kashmir, but also received tributes from Ladakh, Baltistan and the hill states of Jammu.

== Background and early life ==
Yousuf Shah Chak was born in 1545 to Ali Shah Chak, a brother of Ghazi Shah Chak, the Wazīr i Azam (Prime Minister) of the Shah Mirs and later a Sultan himself. Yousuf ruled Kashmir for 8 years with an interregnum of 1 year and 11 months when his throne was occupied by rebels. Even though he led a life of luxury and ease, Yousuf reputedly always cared for the welfare of his subjects. He went against the rebels and defeated them. Wishing to secure his throne, he agreed to the superiority of Emperor Akbar, which in the end led to his own dismissal.

Not much is known about Yousuf's early life. He was born during the reign of Nazuk Shah. Kashmir at that time was under the influence of the Mughals with Mirza Haidar Dughlat as the Governor and the de facto ruler. When Yousuf came of age, he accompanied his uncle on his campaigns and in his journey to the throne. After both of his uncles' reigns, his father ascended the throne in 1570 and appointed Yousuf as his heir apparent the same year.

In 1572, on the advice of Muhammad Bhat, Yousuf assassinated his uncle Aiba Khan, who was a contender to the throne, and then went away to Sopore in the fear of his father. The murder angered his father Ali Shah, who ordered his brother Abdal Chak to capture and bring Yousuf in front of him. Abdal Chak went aggressively against Yousuf, considering the throne for himself after Ali Shah, but with the help of Sayyid Mubarak, the former Wazīr i Azam of Ali Shah, both the parties came to an agreement that reconciled the father and son.

== First reign (1578–1579) ==
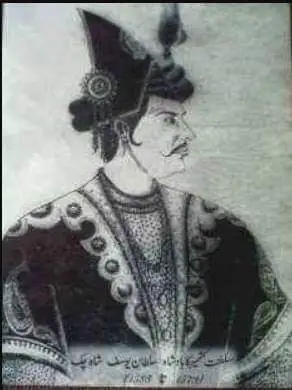
Modern-day depiction of Yousuf Shah Chak

Yousuf was crowned Sultan by his father and predecessor Ali Shah Chak before he died in December 1578. Yousuf appointed Muhammad Bhat as his Wazīr i Azam. Shortly after he ascended the throne, civil unrest started to rise led by Yousuf's uncle Abdal Chak who wanted the throne for himself.

=== Yousuf and Abdal Chak ===
Before the funeral of Ali Shah, Abdal Chak started a campaign to contest for the throne. Sayyid Mubarak tried to restrain Abdal Chak from these activities by sending Baba Khalil to him. Later he visited him and requested him to attend the funeral with the rest of the royal family, but this was in vain because Abdal Chak couldn't forgive Yousuf for assassinating Aiba Khan. Before returning to the court of Yousuf, Sayyid Mubarak warned Abdal Chak that Yousuf was in a much better position than him. Yousuf, on the advice of Sayyid Mubarak and the other nobles, started to organise his army. On the other hand, Abdal Chak also arranged his forces for retaliation.

Abdal Chak and his forces first encountered the advance guard of Yousuf's army led by Muhammad Khan at Nauhatta. Abdal Chak was wounded after being hit by a bullet. While both sides incurred heavy losses, Muhammad Khan was reinforced by Sayyid Mubarak with 2000 horses. After a fierce fight, Abdal Chak was finally killed by Sayyid Mubarak himself and Yousuf, after being ensured that Abdal Chak has been killed, came forward from the rear guard and proclaimed victory while rest of Abdal Chak's broken army ran in disgrace pursued by Yousuf's men. Yousuf forbade Abdal Chak's burial but he was secretly buried by some Sayyids against the Sultan's orders. After Ali Shah's funeral, Yousuf Shah was officially crowned Sultan on the next day.

=== Rebellion by the nobles and abdication ===
After over 2 months of Yousuf's rule in the valley, another rebellion rose to threaten his rule, this time led by a minister in his cabinet, Abdal Bhat, who had been a contender for the office of the Wazīr i Azam but had been declined in favor of Muhammad Bhat. Abdal Bhat convinced the majority of the nobles and ministers who were unsatisfied with Yousuf over negligence in the civil and administrative services while he spent time in the presence of women and alcohol with music and a company of poets. Abdal Bhat proposed Sayyid Mubarak as Sultan after getting Yousuf deposed. Sayyid Mubarak, reluctant at first, agreed because Yousuf was unwilling to cooperate in peace talks even after Sayyid's efforts for reconciliation through the office of Baba Khalil; he joined the rebels.

Even though his senior ministers like Naji Malik warned him to send a more experienced and observant commander, Yousuf sent a force under Muhammad Khan against the rebels in Eidgah, Srinagar. After a ferocious clash between the two sides, Muhammad Khan was killed with 300 of his men. This spread terror among the rest of the army, which then disintegrated.

== Abdication and retreat to Thanna ==
After this crushing defeat, Yousuf was joined by the defeated army, some joined the rebels, while the rest were arrested. According to Baharistan i Shahi, Yousuf's position was so weak that if Sayyid Mubarak made an ambush against Yousuf, he would have been caught but Sayyid Mubarak abstained from this. Seeing the deranged differences between Sayyid and his own strength, Yousuf sent Mulla Hasan Aswad to Sayyid to ask for forgiveness. Sayyid immediately forgave him.

There are two theories on why Yousuf retreated to Thanna. The first one, narrated by Baharistan i Shahi, explains that Sayyid told Yousuf to leave Kashmir as he'll be recalled after three months. Yousuf, reacting to this, retreated to Thanna and waited for his return. The second theory says that Yousuf and his army was too weak to fight Sayyid who was more capable and strong with the help of the nobles. This theory is backed by the fact that Sayyid never had a magnanimous attitude towards Yousuf and would never forgive him over his indecent acts. Regardless of the theories, Yousuf retreated to Thanna leaving his Sultanate and authority in the hands of Sayyid Mubarak and Abdal Bhat.

=== Attempt for the throne ===
When the nobles became dissatisfied with Sayyid after he asserted his own authority rather than being dominated by them, they rebelled and asked Yousuf to return. Yousuf agreed and left Thanna but when he reached Barbal, Sayyid sent him his peace negotiators to which Yousuf sent his sons Yakub and Ibrahim with Mulla Hasan Aswad and Daud Mir. With this great initiative, he readied himself to visit Sayyid himself but Abdal Bhat, who now led the rebellious faction, was on a different page. He was unhappy because of the sudden advancements between the two sides and started to hatch a plot that would end in his favour. Abdal told Yousuf not to believe in Sayyid's words as he can be traitorous. Yousuf agreed, broke off all the ties with Sayyid, and called his negotiators back. Sayyid attacked Yousuf and, with no help from the nobles who gave him their words, was forced to retreat to Thanna again.

Abdal Bhat continued his deceptive plans and made Sayyid Mubarak abdicate in November 1579. He made Lohar Khan, the son of Shankar Chak and a cousin of Yousuf, the Sultan and appointed himself as the Wazīr i Azam. He also threw the insolent nobles in prison and sent a message to Yousuf not to enter Srinagar ever again.

== Return to the throne ==
With the message received, Yousuf became highly annoyed at how his nobles had always favoured their own benefits rather than working for the Sultanate and the public. He knew he alone cannot defeat the rebels and departed from Thanna reaching Lahore to gain the aid of the Mughals. He met Raja Man Singh and Mirza Yusuf Khan, who took him to Agra and was presented to Emperor Akbar in January 1580. Akbar agreed to help Yousuf firmly and ordered Raja Man Singh and Mirza Yusuf Khan to help Yousuf regain his throne. They proceeded to Lahore and raised an army of Mughals. When Muhammad Bhat, his former Wazīr i Azam, heard of this, he joined him at Lahore, leaving his force of 1000 men at Behlolpur. Both Yousuf and Muhammad decided not to command the Mughal army into Kashmir as they would be unpopular and would take over the administration.

Yousuf borrowed some money from the Lahori merchants and with 800 of the men, marched to Behlolpur. Raising another body of 3000 men there with the help of some nobles, Yousuf turned towards Bhimber and after conquering the south-west territories set out towards Nowshera and Rajauri. Both of the cities were easily taken in possession. The Raja of Rajauri, Raja Mast Wali Khan, gave him the command of his vanguard and with this, Yousuf moved again towards Thanna. This time, Lohar Khan sent Yusuf Khan, the son of Husain Shah Chak and the cousin of Yousuf, with Nazuk Bhat, the son of Abdal Bhat. When Yousuf reached the village of Sidau, Yusuf Khan seized Nazuk Bhat and himself entered the services of Yousuf while his army became disintegrated. Chiefs and nobles like Shams Duni, Malik Hasan and many others panicked and joined Yousuf at Thanna.

=== Clashes in Sopore ===
Lohar Khan now despatched Haidar Chak, whom he stationed at Hirpora thinking that Yousuf and his army will cross the Pir Panjal route. Still, in reality Yousuf left a small batch behind and left for Poonch and through the Toshamaidan Pass entered Kashmir. He defeated Lohar's forces at Chira Har and then at Sopore. While crossing the Jhelum river, he destroyed the Sopore bridge and occupied the entire country beyond it. Lohar Khan released Ali Chak to gain his support and called all of his forces back to Srinagar including Haidar Chak who was at Hirpora and set out with a large army towards Sopore but when he saw the bridge razed to ground, he tried to cross it with the means of boats. Still, he was unsuccessful as there was an equally better resistance from the other side of the bank.

After this descent move, Lohar detached a faction of 2000 men under Haidar Chak and ordered him to attack Yousuf through the Khuyahom Pass while he stayed back to watch the enemy's movement. Meanwhile, he sent a message to Yousuf through Baba Khalil that he'll be attacked from the rear and the front and will be left with no other choice but to run away, so he should immediately withdraw from his position and move back. In return, he would be given the jagir of Dachun Khovur. This, for a moment, disheartened Yousuf as he was numerically inferior to the opposition but Hasan Malik encouraged him and guaranteed him victory.

=== Final ambush against Lohar Khan ===
In the early morning of 8 November 1580, Yousuf crossed the Jhelum river and made a surprise attack on the enemy. For retaliation, Lohar Khan sent Ali Bhat with 2000 of his men but was beaten back and defeated. Yousuf's army then marched towards Abdal Bhat, who, after a fierce clash, was killed. Lohar Khan, seeing this, retreated to Brathana (Budgam) and after facing defeat again retreated to Srinagar. Yousuf entered Srinagar without much resistance and proclaimed himself Sultan after 1 year and 11 months in exile and also appointed Muhammad Bhat as his Wazīr i Azam.

== Second reign (1580–1586) ==
After assembling his power over the Sultanate, Yousuf ordered the arrest of Lohar Khan, his brother Muhammad Khan and Hasan Chak. Lohar Khan was found in the house of Qazi Musa, the Qazi of Sopore while Muhammad Khan was discovered in Baramula and Hasan Chak was seized from Mamosa in Bangil Pargana. Additionally, many other chiefs were also arrested and were presented to Yousuf. Yousuf was utterly unhappy with them on how they joined Lohar Khan even though he and his father bestowed them with great favours. He issued the orders to blind Lohar Khan, Muhammad Khan and Hasan Chak, some had their limbs removed while the others were executed. The soldiers and the villagers who joined Lohar Khan were pardoned.

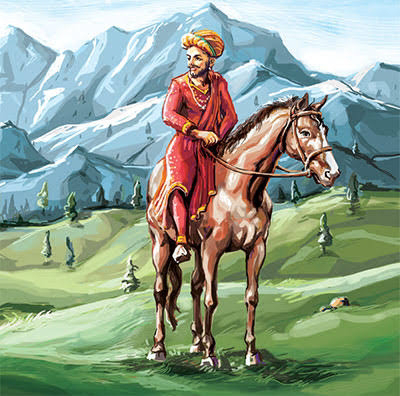
Painting of Yousuf Shah Chak on a Horse

=== Campaign against the rest of the rebels ===
Haidar Chak and another Chak chief from Kupwara, Shams Chak Kupwara fled to Karnav hills after Lohar's defeat. Haidar advised Shams not to stay there for long as Yousuf will soon find out about their whereabouts and will despatch a strong force against them which they'll not be able to resist. Shams, disagreeing with Haidar, stayed back while Haidar ran away to Ladakh. Yousuf, after some time, sent a force against the rebels through the Karnav hills just as Haidar predicted. Seeing this, Shams left Karnav and occupied the fort of Firuz in Pakhli but due to his cruelties in the garrison, the soldiers and chiefs made a request to Lohar for a raid and capture Shams. Lohar did accordingly and led siege to the fort, occupying it shortly after. Shams surrendered and was taken to Yousuf who had him blinded.

=== Yousuf Shah and the Gyalpo (King) of Ladakh ===
In early 1581, Yousuf's cousin Shams Khan Chak, Alam Sher Magre and other nobles started planning to overthrow Yousuf's authority. Still, Yousuf was alerted and arrested the nobles, who were later imprisoned. Alarmed by the advancements, Habib Khan Chak, another noble from the royal family, escaped to the hills where he met with Haidar Chak. Both of them agreed on taking the help of the then Gyalpo of Ladakh Tsewang Namgyal. The Gyalpo secured them the aid of about 4000 horses. Hearing of this, Yousuf sent an army against them, which the rebels couldn't resist as there was no unity between them. The Ladakhi forces withdrew and the rebels either panicked and ran away or surrendered to Yousuf's forces. Haidar Chak went away to Kishtwar while Habib Chak made his way towards Srinagar secretly after finding no routes to escape anywhere else. Habib didn't stop there as he started to make trouble in Srinagar but was found and seized in the village of Sonawar near Takht i Sulaiman. Other nobles like Yusuf Khan and his brothers were seized as well and on the orders of Yousuf, had their limbs removed while Habib was blinded.

After the revolt led by the nobles, Yousuf had to deal with his Wazīr i Azam Muhammad Bhat. Muhammad Bhat had a grudge against Shams Duni and wanted to punish him. Still, Yousuf opposed him. Muhammad Bhat decided to assassinate him with the help of Yusuf Khan but the plot was discovered and Muhammad Bhat fled but was found and imprisoned with some of his followers while the rest escaped to Haidar Chak who was at that time in Kishtwar.

=== Yousuf Shah and Haidar Chak ===
Yakub Shah, Yousuf's son, deserted the royal chamber and escaped to Kishtwar with Aiba Khan Bhat, the son of Abdal Bhat. However, Mulla Hasan Aswad brought him back on the orders of Yousuf but Aiba Bhat remained with Haidar Chak. Other than Aiba Bhat, Shams Chak also joined Haidar Chak after escaping from the prison when Yousuf was away in Lar. This made Yousuf worried and in 1582 he despatched Sher Ali Bhat and Naji Malik with a large army against Haidar Chak in Kishtwar. Sher Ali was killed and Naji Malik was captured in a night attack. This defeat highly favoured the rebels as they further organised their army.

Meanwhile, Yousuf departed with a much larger army and gave Yakub the command of the advanceguard to crush the rebels. However, the rebels made a counterattack and defeated Yakub's men who joined the main army. Even though the majority of the soldiers stepped back, Yakub continued to resist with the rest of the army and after a severe engagement, defeated and routed the rebels. Haidar Chak, along with Shams Chak and Aiba Bhat, fled while Yousuf came to the front and declared victory. He also rewarded Ibrahim and Abul Maali with Khilaats and Jagirs for their courage and bravery. Shams Chak and Aiba Bhat later started peace negotiations with Yousuf who forgave them and granted them Jagirs on the advice of the Raja of Kishtwar.

Haidar, on the other hand, refused to surrender and went to Lahore, receiving the protection of Raja Man Singh, who gave him the Jagir of Bhimber. Yousuf sent Khwaja Qasim to counteract the actions of Haidar but returned unsuccessful. Raja Man Singh, who was angry on Yousuf for not commanding the Mughal troops in Kashmir during the civil war, favoured Haidar for the seat of Sultan and also to strengthen the Mughal sovereignty in Kashmir through a local pawn.

=== Mughal ambassadors to Kashmir ===
Akbar sent Mirza Tahir and Salih Aqil as Mughal ambassadors to Kashmir from Jalalabad when he was returning from Kabul in late 1581. Yousuf received the ambassadors in Baramulla and as a mark of respect, brought them back to Srinagar. The ambassadors delivered the imperial command that Yousuf was not keeping the royal court aware of the matters in Kashmir and Yousuf should also pay personal homage to the Emperor immediately if he's free of any internal dispute. Yousuf discussed the matter with his ministers. They advised Yousuf to leave the life of ease and luxury and prepare for resistance as Akbar is anxious to annex Kashmir but Yousuf paid no attention to their advice and sent precious gifts and his youngest son Haidar Khan with Mirza Tahir and Salih Aqil but these expressions of loyalty didn't satisfy Akbar who sent back Haidar after a year along with Yaqub Sarfi, who was told to represent Akbar's order in the presence Yousuf that he should proceed to the royal court at once or else an army will be sent against him to conquer his land.

Shortly after, Timur Beg was despatched by Raja Man Singh as the Mughal ambassador to Kashmir with the same order. This frightened Yousuf with the repeated summons and sent his eldest son Yakub with Timur Beg. Yakub was presented to Akbar on 9 February 1585. Instead of expressing his approval, Akbar was displeased that Yousuf has evaded his orders not once but twice and has sent his sons who were neither fit for military service nor were ethical with their words.

When Akbar left for Kabul Subah for some internal matters, he sent Hakim Ali Gilani and Baha-ud-din Kambu as his ambassadors to Kashmir on 1 October 1585 with the orders to pay homage to the Emperor as he was in Punjab this time. Yousuf was receiving reports from his son on Akbar's plans regarding Kashmir and after these envoys consulted his counsellors and ministers who begged him to pay more attention to the public, organise his army and to focus more on resisting the upcoming invasion but Yousuf was blinded by Akbar's orders that he should visit the Emperor himself. He was also concerned over Yakub as he was with the Mughals, who may treat him based on how Yousuf may act. Not only the ministers, every person, rich or poor, old or young, were ready to resist the invasion but it helped Yousuf no more who had lost the will to resist.

As the discussions progressed, Yakub secretly escaped the Mughal camp in Khawaspur and reached Srinagar before the envoys. Yakub was unhappy on how Akbar treated him but Yousuf cared no less who wanted to punish him but was stopped by the ministers. Shortly After, Yousuf received Hakim Ali and Baha-ud-din at Khampur and brought them to Srinagar. Both the ambassadors stayed in Srinagar for two months and failed to bring Yousuf with them as the Kashmiris forced Yousuf not to go with them even though he was mentally prepared to accompany the envoy. The envoys left Kashmir and joined the imperial Mughal camp at Hasan Abdal on 13 December 1585.

=== Encounter with the Mughals ===
When Akbar heard of this report, he became highly enraged and just after a week on 20 December 1585, despatched a force of about 5000 horses to invade Kashmir under the commands of Mirza Shah Rukh, Raja Bhagwant Das and Shah Quli Mahram while Haidar Chak and Yaqub Sarfi as guides. The Mughal commanders wanted to invade Kashmir in early spring as the routes will be cleared of snow and also to take the Bhimber route which was much easier to ride on as the chiefs of Bhimber were slightly inclined towards the Mughals but on the orders of Akbar they moved in the harsh winter and also through the Pakhli route as Kashmiris wouldn't be expecting an invasion in the cold winter through Pakhli. Akbar's assessment was proved right as the Mughal forces easily entered Kashmir.

When this news entered Srinagar, the people came to Yousuf and begged him to organise a resistance as they'll be facing harsh circumstances just how they did last time against the Kashgarians when they invaded Kashmir some decades ago. Yousuf, to please his subjects, organised an army for the defence of Kashmir. He released Muhammad Bhat and Alam Sher Magre from the prison and proceeded with the latter to Baramulla and left the former in charge of the capital. At Baramulla he organised three armies, Hasan Malik and Alam Sher Khan commanded the advanceguard, the right was left under Yakub and Abu'l Maali. At the same time, the left was placed under Baba Talib Isfahani and Hasan Bhat, the younger son of Muhammad Bhat. After these appointments, Yousuf proceeded to the Baramulla Pass.

The Mughals and the Kashmiris met at the Buliasa Pass but both the sides were met with hostilities due to the harsh conditions, scarcity of supplies and many other circumstances. Seeing this Raja Bhagwant Das sent an envoy to Yousuf which warned him that the Mughals will be supplied with heavy reinforcements and then it'll be difficult for the Kashmiris to resist anymore. Yousuf held talks with the envoys and after a whole night of discussion was convinced that further resistance would be useless and after cheering up the inhabitants and soldiers in various villages and posts, left his camp with a few horsemen to the Mughal camp on 14 February 1586. Betrayed by their ruler, the Kashmiris appointed his son Yakub instead of him. They continued their resistance under him.

== Treaty and violation ==
Although Raja Bhagwant Das agreed with Yakub, he also held talks with Yousuf and after some time both of them signed a treaty. The treaty was read as;

- ︎The coins should be struck and the Khutba recited in the name of Emperor Akbar.
- ︎The mint, saffron cultivation, shawl manufacture and game laws would be placed under the control of three imperial officers, Khwaja Miraki, Qalandar Beg and Mulla Mazhari.
- The daughter of Mubarak Khan Gakhar would be given in marriage to Yakub.
- ︎Yousuf would be responsible for bringing Yakub to the court of Emperor Akbar.

Akbar didn't approve the treaty but seeing the conditions accepted it. Yakub and his followers, on the other hand, also rejected the treaty and had coins struck and Khutba read in Yakub's name. After this treaty, Mughal forces withdrew from Kashmir and on 28 March 1586 at Attock, Yousuf was placed in the presence of Akbar who, even though received him with respect, imprisoned him, violating the treaty between Yousuf and Bhagwant.

== Administration and policies ==
=== Political government ===
Even though the Sultan held the highest order of the Sultanate with executive, legislative and judicial powers in his hand, he still formed a central government to run his Sultanate effectively. Yousuf thus formed a council (Majlīs e Wūzra) of his most trusted ministers and appointed them accordingly.

- ︎Wazīr i Azam (Prime Minister) was the highest official in the state and was also responsible for the civil administration. He was the constant advisor to the Sultan. The Wazīr i Azam during Yousuf's reign were granted with excellent and sovereign executive and judicial powers and even led expeditions under the Sultan's orders.
- ︎Dīwan i Kul (Finance Minister) was a minister of the Sultan's council who held the economical, revenue and financial powers of the Sultanate. There were many Diwan e Kul under Yousuf's reign who were appointed by Yousuf himself.
- Qāzī'l-Quzāt or the Qāzī of Srinagar (Minister of Religious and Judicial Affairs) was responsible for the religious harmony between the Muslims and the non Muslims. As Kashmiriyat prevailed over the Kashmiris at that time, Qāzī'l-Quzāt played a big role to settle quarrels between the Kashmiri Pandits and the Kashmiri Muslims. Qāzī'l-Quzāt was also in charge of the judicial matters on personal and land disputes.
- Mir Bakhshī or Sipahsālār (Military Commander) was the commander of the military department and led the Sultan's army into foreign invasion or civil wars.
- Amīr i Dar (Lord Chamberlain) had the responsibility to organise royal meetings and also made arrangements for important celebrations in the court.
- Akhūrbek (Chief Master of Horse) was an important office granted to an officer of the Royal Stable. He controlled the Royal Stable and was obliged to take care of the Royal Horses.
- Khazānchī (Lord Treasurer) functioned as the head of the Sultan's treasury, which includes the capital of taxation and management.

=== Taxation ===
Different taxation and duties have been imposed on many occasions throughout the Sultanate. Jizya (Head Tax) was realized from the non Muslims by many Sultans but Yousuf in his tenure, demolished the tax to relieve the non Muslims. Zakāt (Poor Tax) was deposited from every Muslim of the working class or above. 2.5% of their annual income was subtracted and added to the Royal Treasury which was later distributed in the poor and the lower class. It was also given to travellers and students and was spent in providing food and shelter to the needy. Kharaj and Ushr were land taxes. The latter from non Muslims while the former was extracted from the Muslims. Except for these, no other taxes are allowed to be imposed on the public as per the Sharia Law. Still, custom duties were taken from the subjects which came under the pretext of Zakāt. Both the Muslim and Hindu merchants had to pay the custom duty tax. Yousuf also abolished taxes on artisans, cows and gardens and the Zakāt on hanjis (boatmen).

=== Policies ===
Yousuf held a moderate policy towards his subjects. Even though Yousuf was an Orthodox Shia, he deeply cared for his Sunni and Nurbakhshiya subjects. The Kashmiri Pandits were also given special status and high posts in Yousuf's government. The lower class were benefited with various reliefs whether on taxes or duties. Outside of civil policies, Yousuf focused on a conservative foreign policy. He gave the hill states of Jammu much importance, especially Kishtwar, by marrying his son Yakub to the daughter of the Raja of Kishtwar. Although the Baltis under Ryalfo Ali Sher Khan Anchan and Ladakhis under Gyalpo Tsewang Namgyal never established peace ties with the Kashmiris, Yousuf was eager to solve the internal disputes between both of them. Yousuf most probably also had his ambassadors sent to various Indian states like Sindh ruled by Tarkhans (Muhammad Baqi Tarkhan), Kalat ruled by Qambranis (Malook Khan Qambrani), Mewar ruled by Sisodias (Pratap Singh) and Marwar ruled by Rathores (Udai Singh) just like his predecessors especially Zain ul Abidin. Yousuf sent precious gifts and presents to the Mughal Emperor Akbar and treated his ambassadors with kindness.

== Personal life ==
Yousuf was credited with a handsome appearance and courteous personality and was fond of music and art. He sought the company of musicians and poets and took pleasure in listening to and composing poems in Persian and Kashmiri. He also took great interest in women and reputedly always had a fancy cup of expensive wine and alcohol near him. Yousuf loved hearing his subjects' worries in his court and solving them himself. He promoted the welfare of the Sultanate by abolishing unnecessary taxes and granting comfort to the peasants like the hanjis (boatmen).

It isn't certain on how many times Yousuf married, but he made Habba Khatoon his Queen Consort after he regained the throne in late 1580. He showered Habba with love and affection and the same was returned by Habba. One day, when Yousuf was out on hunting that he heard Habba singing under a Chinar tree, he was so attracted to her soft and delicate voice and her beauty that he fell in love with her. Habba also fell in love with the young prince. Habba was only 16 while Yousuf was about 25 when they married in 1570. He was blessed with three sons, Ibrahim Shah Chak, Haider Khan Chak and Yakub Shah Chak. Yakub was his eldest son and succeeded him as the Sultan.

After his exile, Yousuf could not adapt to Bihar's harsh heat after life in the valley of Kashmir, which had a colder climate. He also missed his Queen Habba whom he loved dearly. Habba also could not live without Yousuf and reputedly wandered in the valley reading and writing poems for the love she felt that never vanished.

== Later life and death ==
Yousuf was given in charge of Ram Das Kachwaha as a prisoner. This affected Bhagwant Das, who saw this as a challenge to his honour as a Rajput. After Akbar reached Lahore, Yousuf was placed in charge of Raja Todar Mal who imprisoned him for two and a half years. In 1589, Raja Man Singh returned from Kabul and requested that Akbar release Yousuf. Accepting his request, Yousuf was released and was given a mansab of 500 horses, a rank with the salary of 2,100 to 2,500 rupees monthly, and was sent with Raja Man Singh to Bihar.

Along with the separation from the love of his life Yousuf couldn't tolerate his new condition and fell seriously ill. After six days of illness he died in Puri, Orissa on 22 September 1592 (14 Dhu al-Hijjah 1000 AH). He was buried in Biswak, Bihar just next to his son Yakub.

== Legacy ==
Yousuf is regarded as the last effective ruler of Kashmir. He is still proudly mentioned in Kashmiri literature for his love for the Sultanate and how he cared for his people, submitting his will and presenting his own throne to the Mughals without knowing that he would never get the opportunity to rule again.

== Bibliography ==
- Hasan, Mohibbul (1959), Kashmir under the Sultans, Aakar Books, ISBN 978-81-87879-49-7
- Pandit, K. N. (1991). BAHARISTAN-I-SHAHI A Chronicle of Mediaeval Kashmir (1st ed.). Firma KLM Private Limited. ISBN 978-81-88643-83-7.
- Chādūrah, Ḥaydar Malik (1991). History of Kashmir. Delhi: Bhavna Prakashan.
