= Kashmir Sultanate =

Sovereign state in South Asia (1320–1589)

Sultanate of Kashmir 𑆑𑆯𑇀𑆩𑆵𑆫 𑆱𑆬𑇀𑆠𑆤𑆠𑇀 (Sanskrit) سلطنت کشمیر (Persian) سَلطَنَتِ کٔشیٖر (Kashmiri) سَلْطَنَة اَلْكَشْميرّ (Arabic)
- 1320–1323; 1339–1589
- Royal Standard (Note: According to the contemporary author Jonaraja who wrote in his edition of the Rajatarangini: "The long lines of blood-red banners which were displayed, seemed like crests of the fire of the new king’s prowess.")
- Motto: نرجو أن يتم الحفاظ عليها من الدمار (Arabic) (lit. May she be preserved from destruction)
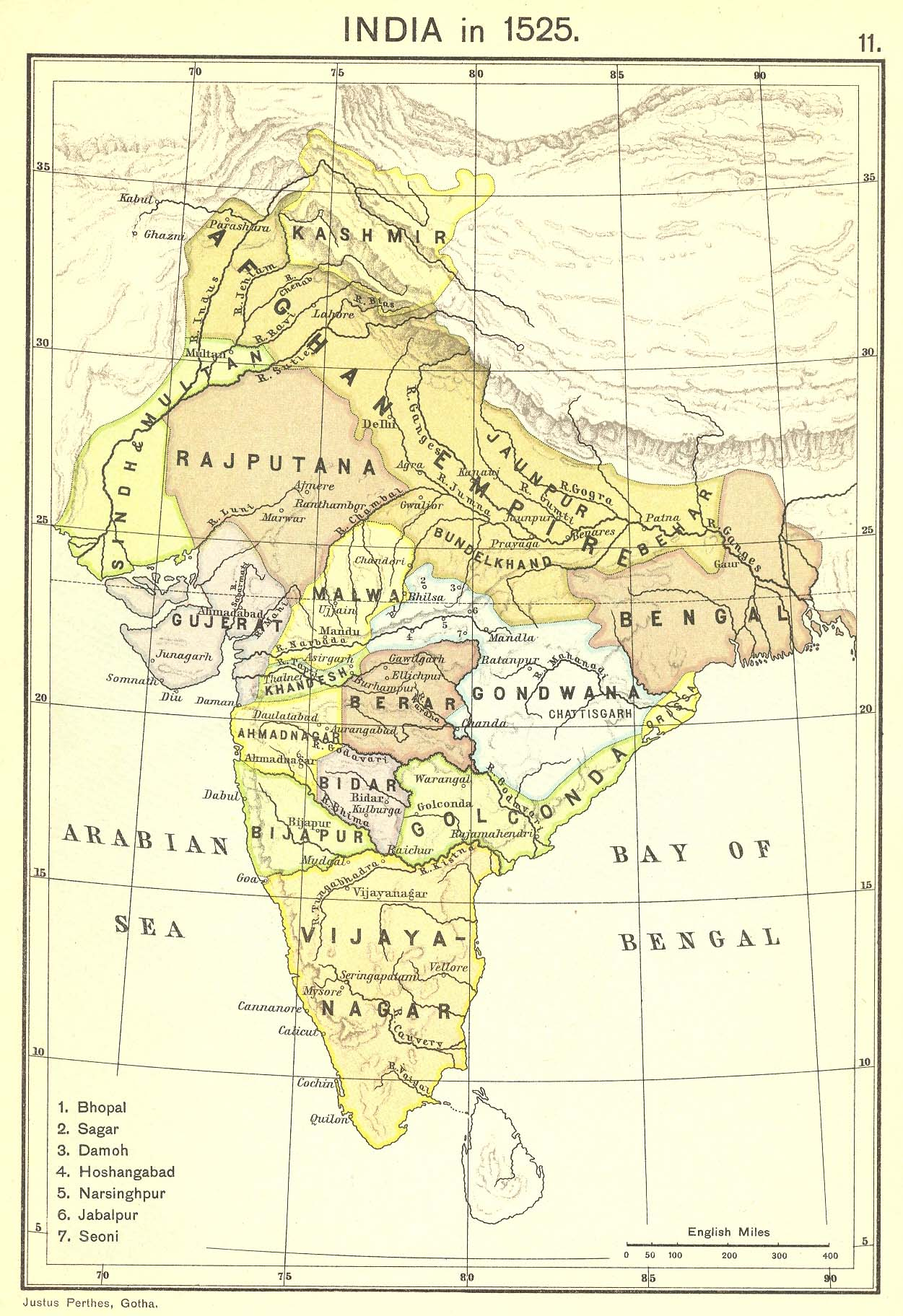
- Kashmir Sultanate in 1525. (Including the hill states of Gilgit and Jammu, Maqpon Kingdom and Maryul Kingdom as tributary states)
- Status: Sultanate
- Capital: Srinagar (1320–1323; 1339–1343; 1354–1470; 1472–1529; 1530–1586); Sikandarpur (1470–1472); Naushahra (1529–1530); Chandrakot (1586–1587); Varmul (1587–1588); Suyyapur (1586–1588) no centralised capital (1588–1589)
- Largest city: Srinagar
- Common languages: Sanskrit (widely used in administration, court and government until the end of 14th century); Persian (widely used in administration, court and government); Kashmiri (native language, given official status later on); Dardic languages Arabic (religious)
- Religion: State religion: Sunni Islam (Shafi'i and Hanafi) (1320–1561); Shi'a Islam (Imamiyya) (1561–1589); Minority religions: Hinduism; Buddhism
- Demonym: Kashmiri
- Government: Unitary centralized absolute monarchy
- Sultan
  - 1320–1323 (first): Sadr'ud-Din Shah
  - 1586–1589 (last): Yakub Shah Chak
- Wazir
  - 1320–1323 (first): Tukka
  - 1586–1589 (last): Nazuk Bhat
- Legislature: Durbār (c. 1339–1586)
- Historical era: Medieval India
  - Conversion of Rinchan Shah: December 1320
  - Lohara Interruption: 1323–1339
  - Shah Mir–Lohara War: 1338–1339
  - Kashmir Civil War: December 1419–July 1420
  - Mughal Interregnum: December 1540–October 1551
  - Battle of Vahator: 13 August 1541
  - Mughal Invasion: 20 December 1585–8 August 1589
  - Battle of Hastivanj: 10 October 1586
  - Fall of Srinagar: 14 October 1586

Area
- 1342: 222,236 km^{2} (85,806 sq mi)
- 1389: 250,000 km^{2} (97,000 sq mi)

Population
  - 1578: 280,000
- Currency: Gold Dinar, Gold Tanka, Gold Mohur, Silver Taka, Silver Sasnu, Copper Kaserah, (Note: Also minted as 'Punchshi') Brass Falus, Lead Dvitinnari
| Preceded by | Succeeded by |
| Lohara dynasty; Delhi Sultanate | Mughal Kashmir |

The Kashmir Sultanate, (Note: Sanskrit: 𑆑𑆯𑇀𑆩𑆵𑆫 𑆱𑆬𑇀𑆠𑆤𑆠𑇀, Persian: سلطنتِ کشمیر, Kashmiri: سَلطَنَتِ کٔشیٖر, Arabic: سَلْطَنَة اَلْكَشْميرّ) historically Latinised as the Sultanate of Cashmere, was a medieval kingdom primarily based in the Kashmir Valley, in the northern part of the Indian subcontinent, between the early 14th and late 16th centuries. It was established by Rinchan Shah, a Ladakhi noble who had converted from Buddhism to Islam. After a brief interregnum by the Loharas, Shah Mir, a councillor of Rinchan, overthrew the Lohara dynasty and founded his own dynasty. The Shah Miris ruled from 1339 until they were deposed by the Chak warlords and nobles in 1561. The Chaks continued to rule the sultanate until the Mughal conquest in 1586 and their surrender in 1589.

The Kashmir Sultanate was a Muslim monarchy comprising Kashmiri, Turco-Persian, Dardic, and Ladakhi elites. Rinchan Bhoti, a Ladakhi Buddhist who converted to Islam and served as the first sultan, was followed by two main dynasties: the Shah Miris and the Chaks, except for the brief rule by a Baihaqi Sayyid, Mubarak Baihaqi, in 1579. The culture of the kingdom was based on Kashmiriyat; although Sanskrit and Persian were used as the official, diplomatic, court, and state languages, Kashmiri played an increasingly prominent role in the cultural and literary activities, later being granted official status. The economical centre, as well as the main mint city of the sultanate, Srinagar, served as its capital for the major part while the cities of Varmul, Sopar, and Islamabad, and the valley of Neelum, were the notable commercial and residential areas. The sultanate built diplomatic and trading relations with kingdoms in Bihar, Tibet, China, Khorasan, and Turkestan, while Punjab and Bengal were its main trading partners.

During the sultanate period, the valley was influenced by various orders of Sufism and Mysticism, notably the Suhrawardiyya, Kubrawiya, Rishi, and Nurbakhshiya. A syncretic culture evolved with the interaction between the Kashmiri Pandits and Kashmiri Muslims. The prominent Kashmiri religious figures of the period include Lal Ded, Nund Rishi, Habba Khatun, Yaqub Sarfi and, Habibullah Nowshehri. A new architectural style, adopting elements of the wider Indo-Islamic architecture within the regional Kashmiri style evolved, whose examples can still be seen in the old mahalas of Srinagar.

== History ==
=== Background (13th and 14th centuries) ===
A number of attempts had been made to conquer Kashmir, first by the Arabs in the 7th and 8th century, and then by the Turks in the 11th century, but it was not until the reigns of Mahmud of Ghazni and Muhammad of Ghor that Kashmir faced serious threat. It was at this time that Tajik traders entered Kashmir and were permitted to serve in the Lohara army. With the Hindu dynasty weakened, Kashmir became a subject to the Mongol invasions in the 13th century. Unable to fend off the invasions this time, Kashmir became a Mongol dependency some time after 1235. In 1320, a Mongol commander, Zulju, with an army of Qara'unas, entered Kashmir and, after perpetrating all types of atrocities and violence, left the valley with the loot. As the king Suhadeva fled to Kishtwar, the Valley passed on to the hands of local chiefs who asserted independence. The most prominent of them were Ramacandra, the commander-in-chief of Suhadeva, and Rinchan Bhoti, a Ladakhi Buddhist noble, who left Ladakh after his father, a Ladakhi chief, was killed by the Baltis. Rinchan, who upon killing Ramacandra in a surprise attack, found none stronger than himself, ascended the throne as Rinchan Shah.

The first challenge faced by Rinchan was to gain the trust of the public and of the nobles. To manage this, he released Ramacandra's son, Rawancandra, and his family, granting him some jagirs and the title of Raina (Lord). He also appointed him his Mir Bakhshi (Commander-in-Chief) and married his sister, Kota Rani, who had previously been the queen consort of Suhadeva. Later Rinchan faced Suhadeva, who had returned to the Valley after Zulju's departure. He attempted to turn the people against Rinchan, however he was repulsed by the people, as the memory of his betrayal was fresh. Soon after these events, the Lavanyas, a feudal tribe, challenged Rinchan but were defeated and forced to acknowledge him.

The king always had a council of cultured men and artisans in his court, along with Muslim scholars and Hindu and Buddhist priests. Rinchan later on in the same year, at the hands of Bulbul Shah, embraced Islam and adopted the title of Sultan Sadr'ud-Din, becoming the first sultan of Kashmir. Rawancandra also accepted Islam and became a close associate of the sultan. Shah Mir also entered the government of the Sultan and was a trusted councillor of the sultan. He even appointed him as the tutor of his son, Haidar. Sultan Sadr'ud-Din faced an assassination attempt by Tukka, his former vizier, and his followers. The preparators left him with a serious head injury, but he was rescued by his vizier, Vyalaraja. The Sultan took the enemies by surprise and executed them. He also had their wives killed by disemboweling.

The wound on the Sultan's head proved fatal, and he died in 1323. He was buried near the masjid he had built in Srinagar. After the Sultan's demise, Udayanadeva, the brother of Suhadeva, was called back from Swat to claim the throne at the behest of Kota Rani, with the consent of Shah Mir and other nobles, as Haidar was still a minor.

=== Early Years (14th Century) ===
The rule of Udayanadeva lasted until his death in 1338, and he was succeeded by his wife, Kota Rani. Shah Mir, in the meantime, strengthened his position in the cabinet of Udayanadeva. Kota Rani appointed Bhatta Bhikshana, a powerful minister, as her Prime Minister, ignoring Shah Mir. She also moved her capital to Andarkot as Srinagar was at that time Shah Mir's stronghold. This angered Shah Mir, who marched against her. At the outset of the war, he assassinated Bhikshana through a conspiracy and threatened Kota Rani to surrender and marry him. Kota Rani, after seeing her troops and chiefs deserting her, acquiesced. Shah Mir married her at first, but seeing the support she had in the kingdom, he threw her and her children in prison while he himself ascended the throne as Sultan Shamsu'd-Din Shah.

With the behest of the new rule, a new era, namely the Kashmiri era, replaced the old Laukika era established by the Hindu Emperors. Shamsu'd-Din set up to Islamise the sultanate, appointing Muslim converts to major posts in the government. After his death in 1342, the Sultanate passed on to Shamsu'd-Din's sons, Jamshid and Ali Sher.

Jamshid, being the eldest, ascended the throne in 1342 and adopted the title of Sultan Jamshid Shah. Jamshid worked on the state affairs and infrastructure, constructing various towns and villages and helping the people who were displaced by the Zulju invasion. Meanwhile, Ali Sher, in 1343, after a previously failed attempt, successfully usurped the throne and declared himself as Sultan, during Jamshid's absence in Kamraj. Ali Sher took on the title of Sultan Alau'd-Din Shah. Alau'd-Din was a just and able ruler, bringing back the peasants who left Kashmir after the Zulju invasion and giving them shelter and bread. He promulgated the first social and moral laws of the Sultanate, which helped not only the widows but the orphans as well. He also defeated the Lavanyas, who rose back to prominence and reclaimed their land. After a reign of eleven years, Alau'd Din died in 1354 and was buried in his new town Alau'd-Dinpur.

=== Expansion (14th and 15th centuries) ===
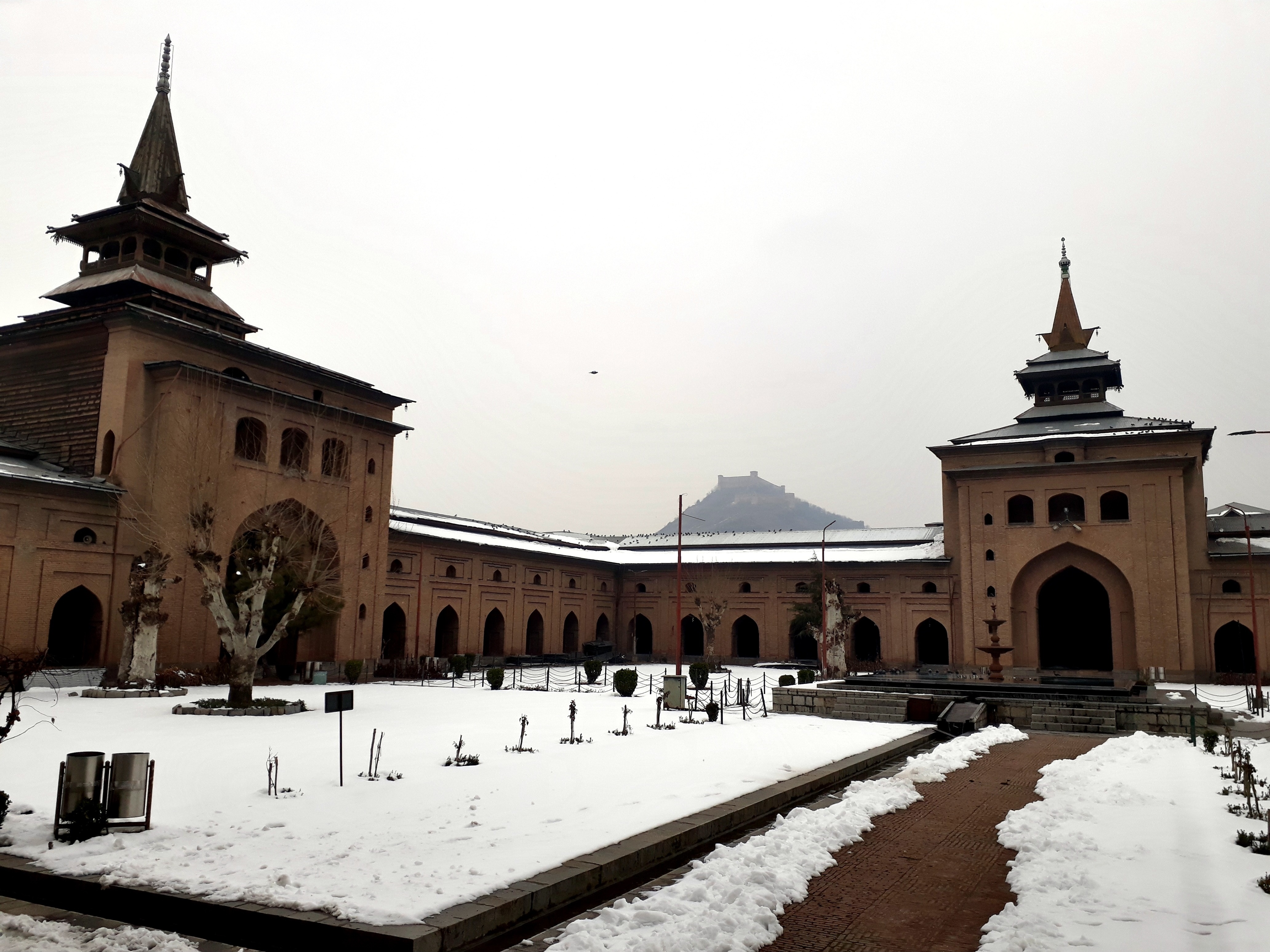
Jamia Masjid of Srinagar, built in 1394 CE by ruler Sikandar Shah Miri.

As a broad-minded intellectual, Shihab'ud-Din, in the first half of his tenure, took care of the Sultanate and brought stability to the social and integral structure of Kashmir. Full of animation and efficiency, Shihab'ud-Din set out to conquer its neighbouring polities, aiming to expand and further glorify his state. Marching through Baramulla, he first occupied Pakhli and went on to add Swat to his realm. Next, he invaded the Khokhar-dominated Pothohar, which extended from Attock to Sialkot. His commander-in-chief (Mir Bakhshi), Malik Candra, on the other hand, subdued Jammu, Kishtwar, Chamba, and other hill states. Occupying all the bordering states in the south, Shihab'ud-Din went on to defeat the Dardic forces of Gilgit and the hill states of the north. Baltistan, under the Maqpons, and Ladakh, under the Maryuls, were at that time tributary states of Moghulistan and Tibet, respectively. Shihab'ud-Din, along with Malik Candra, faced the Baltis and Kashgaris, defeating them easily. He then moved towards Ladakh, defeating the joint forces of Ladakhis and Tibetans. After all these conquests, Shihab'ud-Din returned to Srinagar around 1370, seeking to live the rest of his life peacefully, however only a few years later, in 1373, he died due to a viral illness.

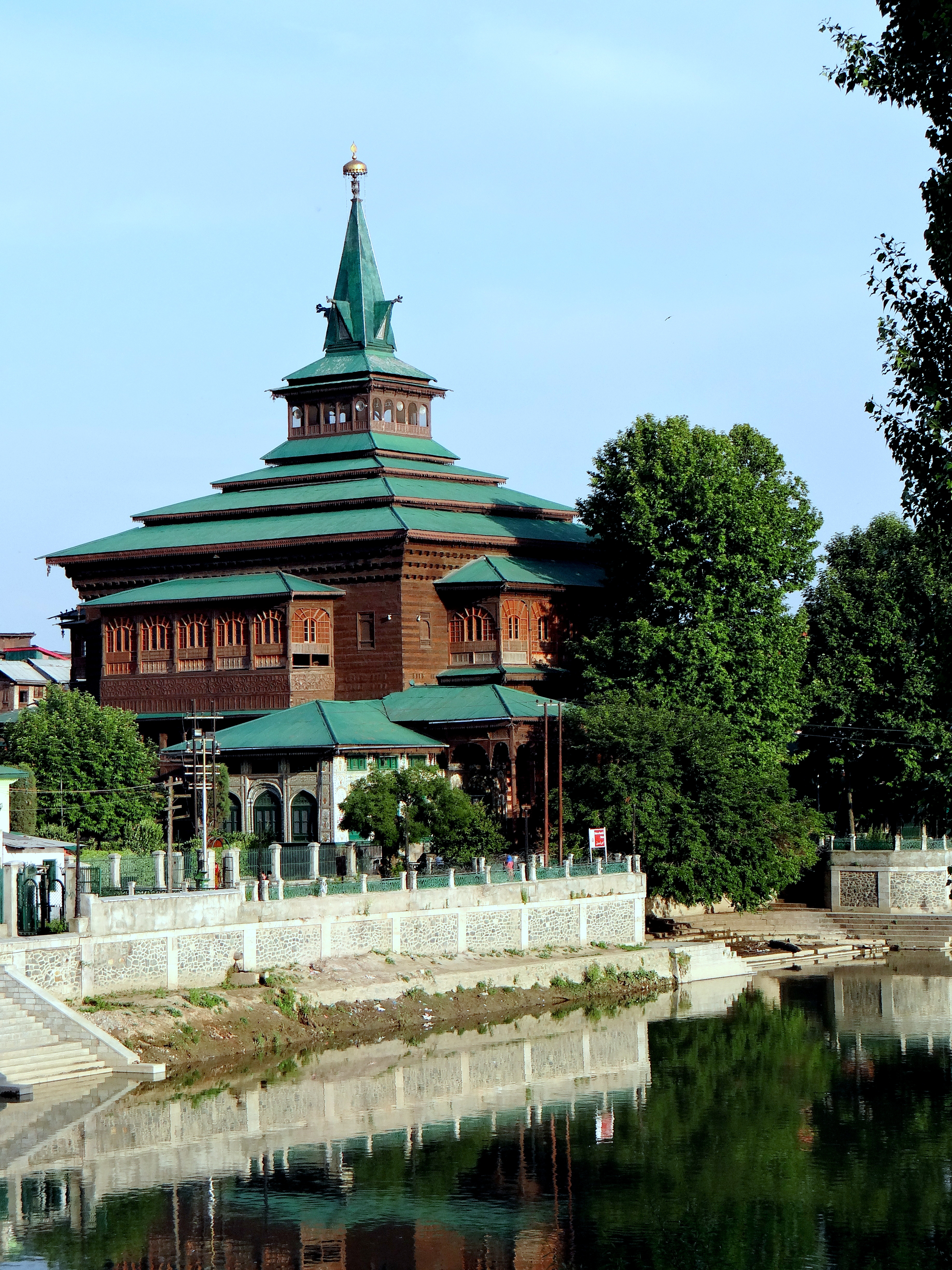
The Khanqah-e-Moula on the banks of Jhelum river, built during reign of Sikandar Shah Miri in 1395

Shihab'ud-Din's brother, Hindal, ascended the throne in 1373 as Sultan Qutbu'd-Din Shah. Qutbu'd-Din defended his boundaries and lived most of his life as a "poet or a patron of learning." Sayyid Ali Hamadani visited Kashmir in 1379 and was courteously welcomed by him. Hamadani stayed in Kashmir for three years, spreading his Kubrawiya teachings, which were widely accepted throughout Kashmir as the official order of the government. Qutbu'd-Din was an old man when Shingara was born to him, who was appointed as the heir apparent just after his birth. Qutbu'd-Din died in 1389, and Shingara succeeded him as Sultan Sikandar Shah.

Many Islamic scholars and preachers visited Kashmir in Sikandar's era, the most prominent one being Sayyid Muhammad Hamadani, the son of Sayyid Ali Hamadani. Hamadani stayed in Kashmir for nearly twelve years and proceeded on a pilgrimage to Mecca. Sikandar's era is remembered due to his interaction with the Turco-Mongol conqueror, Timur. Sikandar was also involved in iconoclastic activities, side-lining and mistreating the Kashmiri Pandits. These activities were continued by his son and successor Ali Shah, who, under the influence of his Wazir Saifuddin, forced the Pandits out of the Valley. Shahi Khan, the younger brother of Ali Shah, served as the Wazir of Ali Shah by defeating Hamsabhatta, but when Ali Shah, in 1418, left for Mecca for a pilgrimage, he gave Shahi Khan the authority. Shahi Khan, seeing the dire situation of the Sultanate, revolted and usurped the throne. Ali Shah, with the help of his father-in-law and the Raja of Jammu, Bhim Dev, defeated Shahi Khan, which led to the start of a civil war between Shahi Khan and Ali Shah. Shahi Khan, with help and support from Jasrat Khokhar and Jam Fath, turned out victorious and ascended the throne as Sultan Zainu'l-Abidin in 1420.

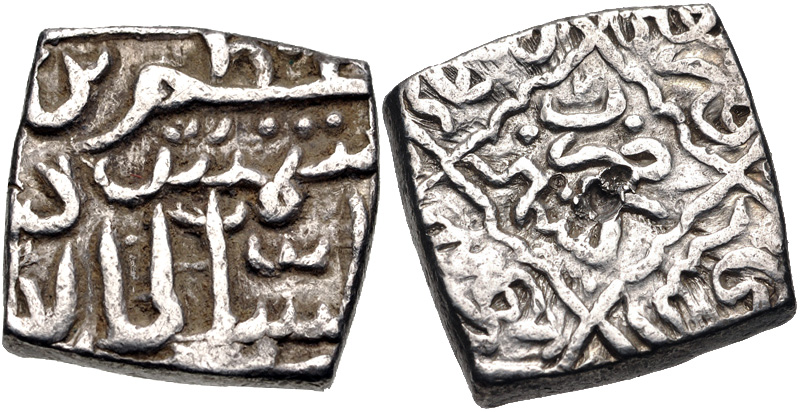
Coin of the Islamic Sultanates of Kashmir. Dated AH 842 (1438 CE). Kashmir mint

Major contributions to the development of the Sultanate were carried out during the reign of Zainu'l-Abidin. Referred to as the "Akbar of Kashmir" by modern authors, Zainu'l-Abidin espoused secular motives, calling back the Pandits who left the Valley during the reign of his father and brother. Temples, which were in a critical state, were repaired and restored. Relations were improved with foreign countries such as Bengal, Gujarat, Sindh, and Punjab, forming a mutual alliance with Kashmir. Trade and agriculture were enhanced, education was encouraged, and religious harmony was established between the two communities (Muslims and Pandits), which was later referred to as Kashmiriyat. Zainu'l-Abidin was followed by a weak line of succession who were rather involved in their personal interests, rather than the needs of the Sultanate.

=== Decline and Annexation (15th and 16th centuries) ===
After the reign of Haidar Shah (1470–1472) and Hasan Shah (1472–1484), the two sons of Zainu'l-Abidin, a power struggle started between Fath Shah and Muhammad Shah. One of the two factions, at times, was supported by the Mughals, while the other was backed by the nobles. Mughal commanders Kuchak Beg and Shaikh Ali Beg led an expedition under Babur to Kashmir in 1527, supporting Sikandar Shah II against Muhammad Shah. Muhammad Shah, with the help of Lohar Magre and Kaji Chak, defeated the Mughals near Naushahra, whereas Sikandar Shah was blinded and later died in prison. The Mughals again marched onto Kashmir, with Kamran Mirza as their commander in 1531. Even though Srinagar was sacked, Kaji Chak, along with his army, defeated and routed Kamran back to India. Another attempt to annex Kashmir was carried out, this time by Sultan Said Khan of the Yarkent Khanate. Said Khan dispatched Haidar Dughlat, a Chagatai Turco-Mongol military general, to Kashmir in 1533. Despite early defeats, Kashmiris repelled and defeated Turco-Mongol forces, forcing them to sign a peace treaty that same year.

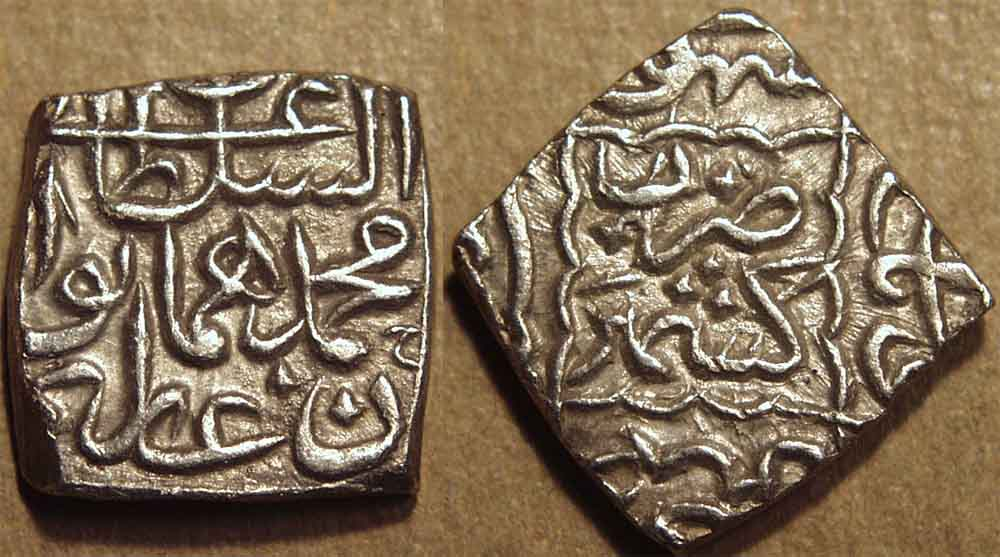
Silver sasnu issued in 1546–50 in Kashmir by Haidar Dughlat, in the name of the Mughal emperor Humayun.

Dughlat later took the service of Mughal emperor Humayun and attacked Kashmir again in November 1540. Kashmir was formally annexed in December 1540, and coins were issued in the name of Humayun. Sultan Nazuk Shah was set up on the throne as a puppet. Kaji Chak and Regi Chak, the only two generals who were fighting the Mughals, and also fought in the Battle of Vahator on 13 August 1541, died in 1544 and 1546 respectively. This system was regulated until 1551, when Kashmiris under Nazuk Shah and Daulat Chak hurdled their way through the Mughal defence and killed Dughlat in the chaos. The Shah Mirs were greatly weakened in these invasions and were controlled by other families, mainly the Chaks. Habib Shah (1557–1561) was dethroned by Ghazi Shah Chak in 1561 and acquired the title of Muhammad Humayun, thus ending the rule of the Shah Mir dynasty.

Mughals, under Akbar, were busy subduing southern and eastern India, allowing the Chaks to rule the Valley. Akbar, in 1579, set his eyes on Kashmir after seeing the political state of the Sultanate divided between Yousuf Chak, Sayyid Mubarak and Lohar Chak. From 1581 till 1585, Akbar struggled to force Yousuf to ratify his superiority and pay a visit to his court in Fatehpur Sikri. All these efforts were in vain, and as a last resort, Akbar sent an army of around 5000 under Raja Bhagwant Das in late 1585. Bhagwant Das convinced Yousuf to surrender and sign a treaty with him, which stated that Yousuf would be reinstated as the Sultan while the forces were to be withdrawn, but when he was taken to Akbar, he was immediately imprisoned.

Kashmiris chose Yakub Chak, Yousuf's son, as their Sultan in 1586 and continued their struggle. Yakub Chak fled to Kishtwar when the Mughals attacked Kashmir again, and was temporarily replaced by Shams Chak, Yousuf's second cousin. In Yakub's absence, the Mughals, now under a new commander, Qasim Khan, and Kashmiris, under Shams Chak, faced each other in the Battle of Hastivanj. The battle ended in Qasim's favor and the Mughal rule was formally instigated on 14 October 1586 while Shams and the Kashmiris were soundly defeated. This came as a shock to Yakub, who joined forces with Shams and fought the Mughals for three years until both of them surrendered in the year 1589.

== Government ==
Majority of the crowning rituals of the Sultanate were adopted from the previous Lohara and Utpala kings. The crown was made an exclusive privilege of the Sultan to execute orders and bestow robes of honour on nobles, officials and tributaries.

While Kashmiri monarchy was uniformly laid throughout the Valley, Srinagar served as the most important station with the residence of the Sultan and the office of the Central Record Department. Royal forts at Sopar and Islamabad also became significant in later years of the Sultanate.

=== Central Government ===
Even though the Sultan held the highest order of the Sultanate with executive, legislative and judicial powers in his hand, he still formed a central government to run his Sultanate effectively thus forming a council (Shura) of his most trusted ministers and appointed them accordingly.

- Wazīr (Prime Minister) was the highest official in the state and was also responsible for the civil administration. He was the constant advisor to the Sultan. The Wazīr was granted excellent and sovereign executive and judicial powers, even leading expeditions under the Sultan's orders.
- Dīwan-i-Kul (Finance Minister) was a minister of the Sultan's council who held the economical, revenue, and financial powers of the Sultanate.
- Mīr Bakhshī or Sipahsālār (Military Commander) was the commander of the military department and led the Sultan's army into foreign invasion or civil wars.
- Akhūrbek (Chief Master of the Horse) was an important office granted to an officer of the Royal Stable. He controlled the Royal Stable and was obliged to take care of the Royal Horses.
- Qāzī'l-Quzāt or Shaikhu'l-Islām (Minister of Religious and Judicial Affairs) was responsible for the religious harmony between the Muslims and the non-Muslims. As Kashmiriyat prevailed among the Kashmiris at that time, Qāzī'l-Quzāt played an important role in settling quarrels between the Kashmiri Pandits and the Kashmiri Muslims. Qāzī'l-Quzāt was also in charge of the judicial matters on personal and land disputes.
- Mīr Ādil (Chief Magistrate) was a local judge appointed only in Srinagar to hear the magisterial cases. The cases which the Mīr Adl couldn't solve were sent to the Qāzī'l-Quzāt.
- Khazānchī (Lord Treasurer) functioned as the head of the Sultan's treasury, which includes the capital of taxation and management.
- Amīr-i-Kotwāl (Chief Police Officer) was responsible for maintaining law and order in the country, and for protecting the citizens from robbers and thieves.
- Amīr-i-Muhtasib (Chief Ombudsman) supervised the markets, inspected weights and measures, and looked after the morals of the people.
- Dabīr (Head of Department) was the most important rank in a government department. They were directly appointed by the Sultan as head of their respective department.
- Amīr-i-Nāyak (Chief Guard) was the guardian of the passes leading into Kashmir. He was responsible for checking and administrating the Nāyaks (Guards) under him.

=== Provincial Government ===
The government of Srinagar was directly under the Sultan, while the two provinces, Kamraz and Maraz, were ruled by a Hākim (Governor) appointed directly by the Sultan. The Hākim was allowed to form his own government to maintain law and order, collect revenue, and dispense justice in the province.

- Qāzi (State Judge) was the head of the judiciary of the province and was appointed by the centre.
- Kotwāl (State Police Officer) was responsible for maintaining law and order in the province.
- Muhtasib (State Ombudsman) was in charge of supervising the markets and looked after the morals of the people in the province.

=== District Government ===
Both the provinces were divided into different parganas (districts), each led by a Shiqdār (District Officer) who was allowed to form his own government. The district government was an exact replica of the provincial government under which the Qāzi/Muftī (Magistrate), Kotwāl (District Police Officer) and Muhtasib (District Ombudsman) exerted their powers.

=== Local Government ===
The pargana itself was further divided into different villages and towns. Each village had a Patwāri (Accountant) who was not only required for accountancy but also to preside over the local government.

- Sarhang Zāda (Local Police Officer) was responsible for maintaining law and order in the village. At times, the Sarhang Zāda was appointed in more than one village.
- Candalas (Watchmen) were appointed by the Sarhang Zāda who swept the houses in the day and acted as watchmen at night.
- Muhtasib (Local Ombudsman) had a duty to oversee the conformity and social behavior of the residents of the village.

== Architecture ==
The Kashmir Sultanate was renowned for its magnificent architecture and heritage, showcasing some of the finest examples of Kashmiri Art and Indo-Persian masterpieces. Some of the architectural projects commissioned by the Sultanate include:

- Ramkot Fort in Mirpur, Azad Jammu and Kashmir
- Jamia Masjid in Srinagar, Jammu and Kashmir
- Khanqah-e-Moulah in Srinagar, Jammu and Kashmir
- Aali Masjid in Srinagar, Jammu and Kashmir
- Tomb of the Mother of Zain-ul-Abidin in Srinagar, Jammu and Kashmir
- Madin Sahib Mosque in Nowshera, Srinagar, Jammu and Kashmir
- Charar-e-Sharief shrine in Budgam, Jammu and Kashmir
- Amburiq Mosque in Shigar, Gilgit-Baltistan
- Chaqchan Mosque in Khaplu, Gilgit-Baltistan
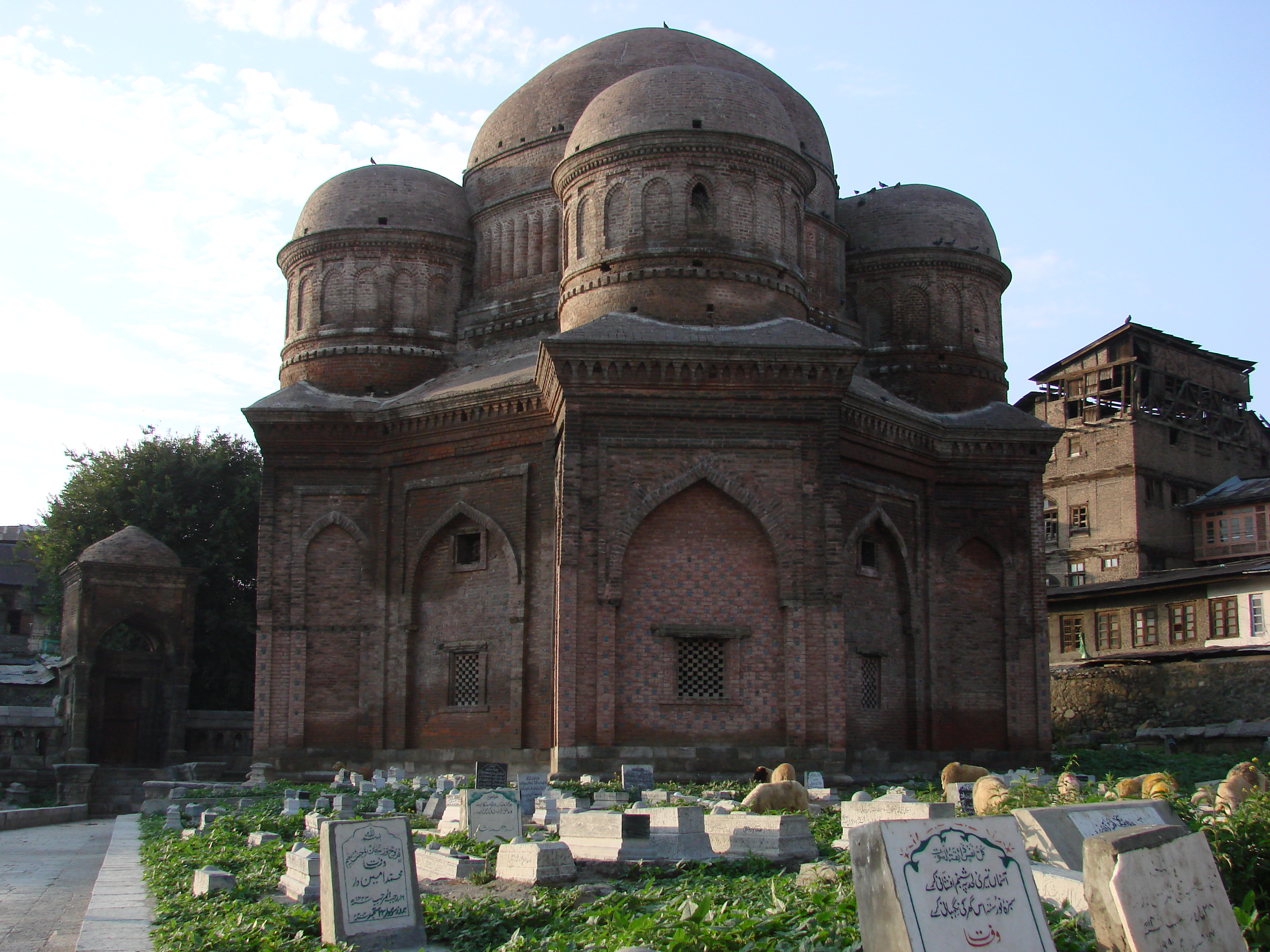
Tomb of the Mother of Zain-ul-Abidin in Srinagar

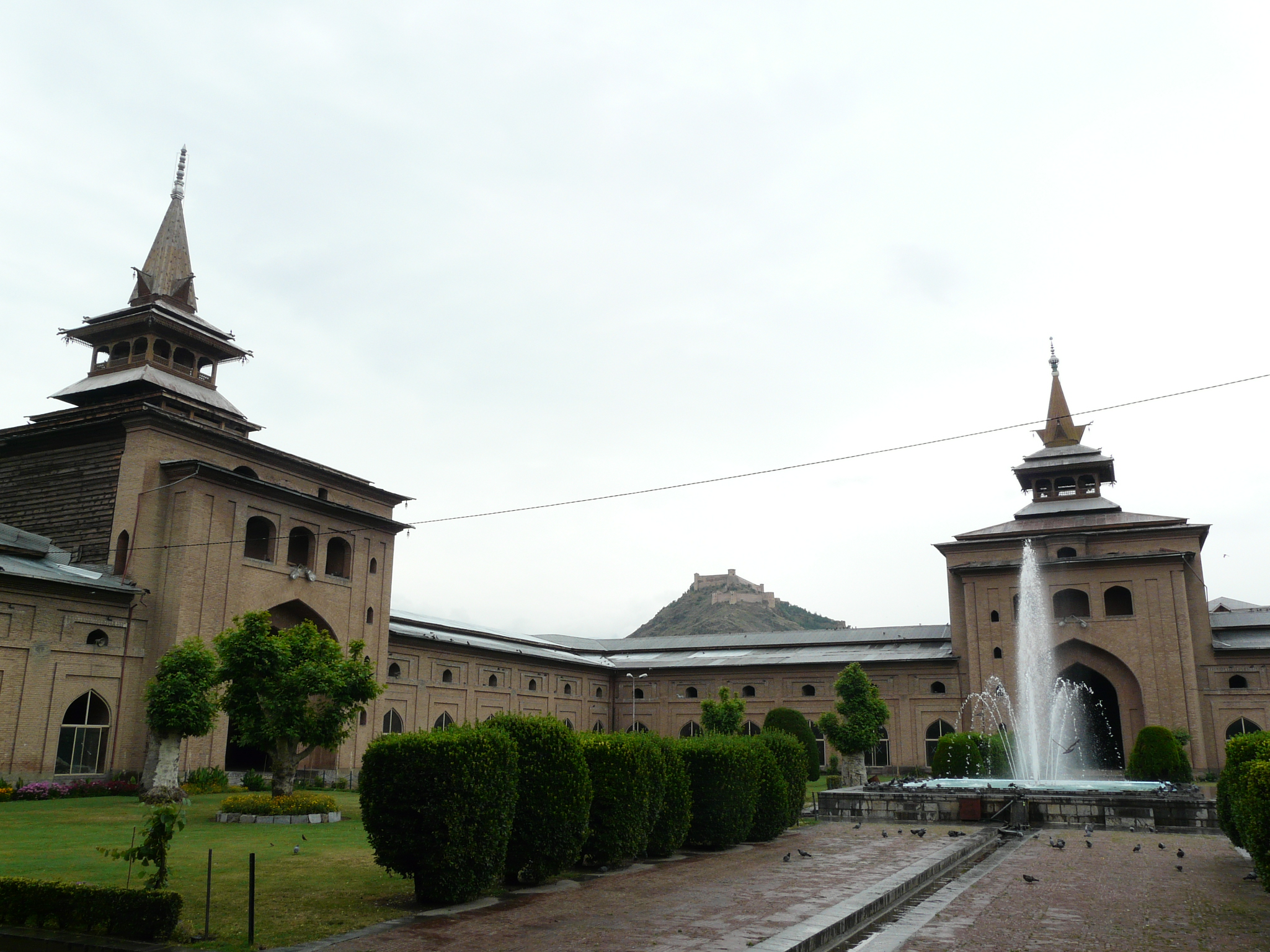
The courtyard of the Jama Masjid, Srinagar. Hari Parbat is visible in the background.

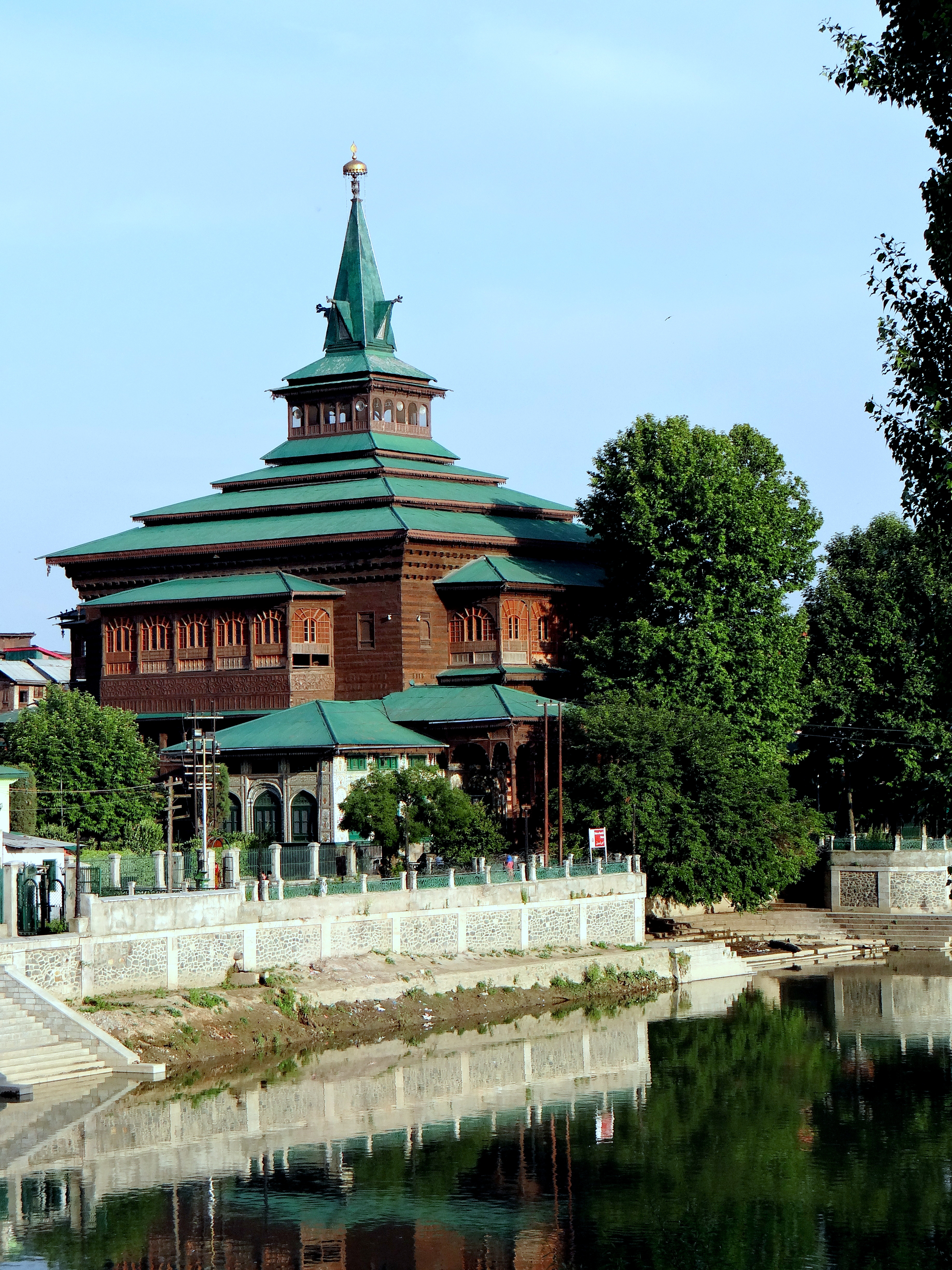
The Khanqah on the banks of Jhelum

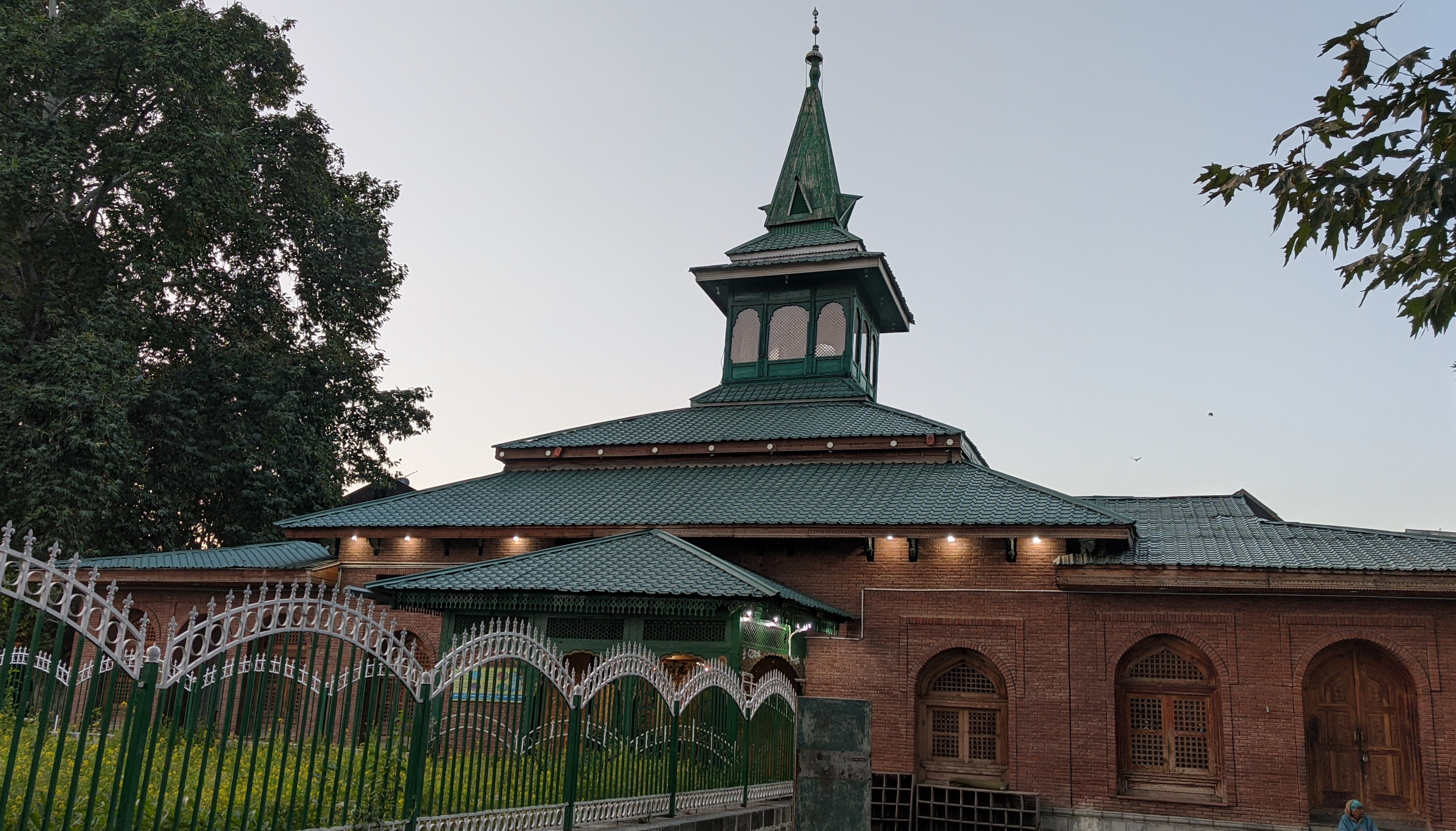
A view of Ziyarat Naqshband Sahab from its yard.

== Tributary states ==
Tributary states were a number of vassal states and dependencies on the fringe of the Kashmir Sultanate under the suzerainty of the Sultan of Kashmir. Direct control was not established over these territories for various reasons. The following illustrates the most notable vassal states.

=== Hill states ===
In the south, the Hill states of Poonch, Rajouri, Kishtwar, and Chibhal (which ruled Bhimber, Mirpur, and the surrounding regions stretching from Pakistani gujrat to indian Naushera) were prominent vassals of the Kashmir Sultanate. During the reign of Shihabu'd-Din, Jammu, Chamba, and Kangra also briefly paid tribute to the Sultan. Marriage alliances were common between the Sultan or the heir-apparent with the daughters of the Rajas. For example, Zayn al-Abidin and Ali Shah both married the daughters of Bhim Dev, the Raja of Jammu. Zayn al-Abidin also married the daughter of Sundar Sena, the Raja of Rajouri. Another example is of Yakub Shah, who married the daughter of Bahadur Singh, the Raja of Kishtwar. Malik Tazi Bhat is often credited with subduing the Hill states on behalf of the Sultan of Kashmir.

=== Swat and Pakhli ===
In the west, the Sultanate of Swat and the Principality of Pakhli were major vassal states of the Kashmir Sultanate. Various accounts mention Shah Mir as a scion of the Gibari dynasty, thus making the Jahangiri Sultans of Swat and Shah Miri Sultans of Kashmir related by blood. Nonetheless, both the kingdoms became a tributary state in the campaigns of Shihabu'd-Din and remained so until the Mughal conquest in 1586.

=== Baltiyul ===
In the northeast, the Maqpon dynasty of Skardu and subsequently of the whole region of Baltiyul paid tribute to the Sultanate of Kashmir. The Ryalfo was forced to recognize the suzerainty of the Sultan on multiple occasions. Shihabu'd-Din himself reduced the region of Baltiyul. After his death, the Ryalfo asserted independence, and it was not until the reigns of Zayn al-Abidin and Hasan Shah that Baltiyul again came under the authority of the Sultan.

=== Ladakh ===
In the southeast, the Maryul Kingdom and later the Namgyal dynasty of Ladakh acknowledged the suzerainty of the Kashmir Sultanate. The Gyalpo based in Leh was defeated multiple times, either by the Sultan of Kashmir himself or by generals dispatched on his behalf. Similarly, the petty chiefs of the Kargil region were also compelled to pay tribute to the Sultanate.

=== Dardistan and Brushal ===
In the far north lay the regions of Dardistan and Brushal, home to the small states of Gilgit, Hunza, Yasin, and Nagar. These states were compelled to pay tribute for much of the Sultanate’s rule. The Raees of Chitral was also, for a time, required to pay tribute. However, due to the vast distance from the centre of power, these states largely remained beyond the effective control of the Sultanate.

=== Pothohar ===
In the northern part of Punjab, numerous city-states like Sialkot, Jhelum, and Pharwala under various tribes pledged allegiance to the Sultan of Kashmir. A treaty between Shihabu'd-Din and Firuz Shah of Delhi granted the areas west of Sutlej to Kashmir. The Khokhars of Sialkot, led by Jasrat Khokhar, were also involved in the Kashmir Civil War.

=== Kishanganga Valley ===
The Kishanganga Valley, west of the Kashmir Sultanate, was inhabited by the Bomba and Khakha tribes. They paid tribute and served in the Sultanate’s army, with some appointed as Nayaks (guards).

== Foreign relations ==
The Kashmir Sultanate had a firm foreign relation policy. The Kashmir Sultanate exchanged embassies with states in Tibet, Africa, Central and South Asia, and the Middle East. Diplomatic missions were despatched, especially in the reign of Zayn al-Abidin (1420–1470). The Sultanate maintained close and cordial relations with the Sharifate of Mecca, revered across the Islamic world as the Custodians of the Holy Mosque and guardians of the sacred sanctuaries. Numerous distinguished families from Iran and Iraq migrated to Kashmir. Among them was the eminent Sayyid Baihaqi family, originally hailing from the historic city of Sabzevar, who ultimately made their home in Srinagar. Notably, a scion of this illustrious lineage, Sayyid Mubarak, ascended—albeit briefly—to the throne as Sultan of Kashmir.

In the Islamic world, the Sultanate acknowledged the nominal suzerainty of the Abbasid Caliph in Cairo, with its sovereigns customarily assuming honorifics that reflected deference to the supreme religious authority of the Caliph. A notable example is Zayn al-Abidin, who, upon receiving affirmation from Caliph al-Mu'tadid II, adopted the title of Naib Amir al-Mu’minin (Deputy Commander of the Faithful). In the later period of the Sultanate, following the ascendancy of the Shia Chak dynasty, which supplanted the Sunni Shah Mir dynasty, political and religious allegiance shifted away from the Sunni Caliphs. Instead, diplomatic and cultural ties with the Safavid Empire of Iran were significantly strengthened. This affinity was reflected in the regal titles adopted by the Chak rulers—often echoing those of Persian monarchs—such as Nushirvan-i-Adil for Sultan Husain Chak and Ismail Shah for Sultan Yakub Chak.

In Africa, Sultan Sayf ad-Din Barsbay of Egypt sent an envoy bearing gifts to Zayn al-Abidin. This envoy also visited the court of Sultan Jalaluddin of Bengal. In Central Asia, the Timurid rulers of Khurasan and Transoxiana enjoyed cordial relations with the Kashmiri Sultans. During his campaign in India, Amir Timur exchanged correspondence with Sultan Sikandar, marking the beginning of diplomatic ties. This goodwill continued with the exchange of gifts and letters between Timur's successors (Shah Rukh and Abu Sa'id Mirza) and Zayn al-Abidin. Zayn al-Abidin also received presents from the Kar-Kiyas and Eshaqvands of Gilan.

Within the subcontinent, the Kashmir Sultanate had both tense and peaceful relations with the Delhi Sultanate. The Kashmiri chronicles recount a significant peace treaty between Sultan Shihabu’d-Din and Sultan Firuz Shah Tughlaq, wherein the territory west of the Sutlej was ceded to Shihab, while the lands east of the river remained under Tughlaq’s dominion. To further cement this accord, two daughters of Firuz Shah were wed to Shihab and his brother Qutbu’d-Din, while Shihab’s own daughter was given in marriage to the Delhi Sultan, sealing the alliance through royal matrimony. During the rebellion of Jasrat, Sultan Zayn al-Abidin lented his support to Jasrat in opposition to Sultan Mubarak Shah II of Delhi. Diplomatic harmony was eventually reestablished when Sultan Bahlol Lodi, seeking rapprochement, dispatched a formal embassy accompanied by lavish gifts to Zayn al-Abidin. Emperor Yingzong of China, Emperor Kunga Lekpa of Tibet, Sultan Mehmed II of the Ottoman Empire, Jam Tughlaq Juna of Sindh, Raja Dungar Singh of Gwalior, Sultan Mahmud Shah of Bengal, Sultan Mahmud Begada of Gujarat, Sultan Mahmud Khilji of Malwa, Maharaja Jayayakshya Malla of Nepal, and Khan Esen Buqa II of Moghulistan were among the leaders who exchanged embassies with Zayn al-Abidin.

== See also ==
- List of monarchs of Kashmir
- Regional Sultanates of India
- Karkota dynasty
- History of Kashmir
- History of Jammu
- Martand Sun Temple
- Lalitaditya Muktapida
- Rajatarangini & Kalhan
- Gonanda dynasty
