= Malik Tazi Bhat =

- Born: Tazi Bhat; Mid–15th century Jammu, Jammu Kingdom (present-day Jammu and Kashmir, India)
- Died: c. 1487; Sialkot, Kashmir Sultanate (present-day Punjab, Pakistan)
- Military career
- Allegiance: Kashmir Sultanate
- Branch: Royal Standing Army
- Service years: 1475–1487
- Rank: General; Commander-in-Chief
- Nickname: "Tazi"
- Units: Tazi Dasta (Tazi Unit)
- Conflict
- Other work: Administrator

Malik Tazi Bhat (Note: Persian: ملک تازی بٹ, Kashmiri: تٲزؠ بٹھ, Kashmiri pronunciation: [t̪əːzʲ baʈʰ]) was a Kashmiri general and warlord from the Kashmiri Butt / Bhat clan. He conquered and ruled Jammu, Poonch, Rajouri, Bhimber, Jhelum, Sialkot and Gujrat region from 1475 to 1487 on behalf of the Kashmiri Sultan.

== Biography ==
Malik Tazi Bhat was born in a noble Kashmiri Muslim family of Kashmiri Pandit descent which served the Shah Mir dynasty of Kashmir Sultanate.

== Military conquest ==
Rise to Power

In 1475, Malik Tazi Bhat gained hereditary power as a warlord of the Jammu Region. He then waged war against the Sayyid nobles in the region, decreasing their power. After increasing his popularity among the locals of Kashmir and Punjab, he united the regions of Jammu, Poonch, Rajouri, and Bhimber.

War against Lodhi Sultanate

After unifying the regions from Poonch to Jammu, he called war against Bahlol Lodhi in 1479. The Lodhi governor of Lahore, Tatar Khan, then prepared his forces near Sialkot. Tatar Khan then suffered a major loss, and Sialkot was ceded to Tazi's rule in 1480. Tazi later expanded his power from Sialkot to Jhelum. Malik Tazi Bhat then marched towards Lahore, but was stopped by Tatar Khan forces near Lahore. Tazi Bhat continued the war against the Lodhi Dynasty until he died in 1487.

== Personal life ==
Malik Tazi Bhat, was known as an orthodox Muslim. Though he opposed the Sayyid nobility, he married a noble Sayyid girl, from which he had two sons.

== Death ==
He died in Sialkot, Punjab Region, in 1487.
