= Khawaspur =

Coordinates: 32°43′0″N 73°59′0″E

Khawaspur is a town and Union Council of Gujrat District, in the Punjab province of Pakistan. It is part of Kharian Tehsil and is located at 32°43'0N 73°59'0E with an altitude of 259 metres (853 feet).
