= Ali Shah Chak =

Sultan of Kashmir from 1570 to 1578

- Zahīru'd-Din Muhammad Alī Pādshāh Ghāzī; Sulṭān i Kashmīr

21st Sultan of Kashmir
- Reign: 1570 – December 1578
- Predecessor: Husain Shah Chak
- Successor: Yousuf Shah Chak
- Died: December 1578; Srinagar, Maraj, Kashmir Sultanate (Srinagar, Jammu and Kashmir, India)
- Spouse: Fath Khatun
- Issue: Yousuf Shah Chak
Names
- Ali Shah Chak
- Dynasty: Chak dynasty
- Father: Hussain Khan Chak
- Religion: Shia Islam

Ali Shah (Persian: عَلی شاہ, romanized: Alī Shāh, lit. 'Exalted King'; Persian pronunciation: [ali:]) born Alī Shāh Chak (Persian: عَلی شاہ چَک) was the third Chak Sultan that ruled over the Kashmir sultanate succeeding his brother Husain Shah Chak who abdicated the throne in 1570. He was crowned as the 21st Sultan of Kashmir and ruled the Sultanate till 1578. Ali Shah appointed his long time faithful friend Sayyid Mubarak as his Wazīr. He died in December 1578 and was buried in Srinagar, Kashmir.

Ali Shah, although was involved mainly in internal and civil issues, was a just and able ruler. He looked after the welfare of the Sultanate and the subjects. Leading a simple and modest life, he treated all his ministers and councillors equally. With a considerate character, he was kind towards his rivals and even forgave the ones who took up arms against him. Being tolerant and liberal minded, he gave special status to the Sunnis, Pandits and the other ethnic and religious groups. He also appointed his Sunni Orthodox friend Sayyid Mubarak to the post of Wazīr. His authority and rule were widely appreciated and his impartial attitude was greatly accepted by the public.

== Early life ==
Ali Shah Chak was born in the late Shah Mir era. He was third of the six children of Kaji Shah Chak, a Wazīr who served the Shah Mirs for more than 10 years. In his youth, he proceeded his father against his campaigns against the Mughals and the Kashgarians who invaded Kashmir in 1531, 1533 and 1540 respectively. He was given under the tutorship of Mulla Hasan Aswad who have been serving the Chaks since their rise to the throne.

After Kaji's death, his eldest son Ghazi Shah Chak took power in his own hands. In his six years of tenure as a Wazīr, he employed many Chaks to important offices throughout the Sultanate including Ali. In 1561, after Ghazi took the throne for himself, Ali served in his military as a general. He accompanied him in reducing the pro Shah Mir areas and gained his trust. He also served his brother Husain Shah who assumed power after Ghazi was forced to abdicate in 1563.

== Reign ==
In the end of Husain Shah's reign, his brave and capable son, Ibrahim, died. This affected him so badly that he delved into personal grief. As it was difficult to run the government with the ailing health of the Sultan, the nobles forced him to abdicate and asked Ali Shah to take the authority in his hand. Therefore, Ali Shah, in 1570, styled himself as the Sultan of Kashmir and conferred himself with the title of Zahīru'd-Din Muhammad Alī Pādshāh Ghāzī. On his accession, he made Sayyid Mubarak his Wazīr and gave his daughter to Sayyid's son Abu'l Maali.

=== Internal Conflicts ===
After almost two years of his reign, Ali Khan, a Chak noble, entered into an alliance against Ali Shah with other notable nobles in 1571. Alerted of this scheme, Ali Shah decided to execute them but abandoned it after Sayyid Mubarak intervened on his behalf. Ali Khan first stayed in Kamraj and later fled to Lahore where he was welcomed by Husain Quli Khan. Having difficulty negotiating with Quli Khan, he went to Mankot. Hearing this news, Ali Shah sent a force and captured him. After spending a year and a half in prison, he was released by presenting one hundred gold dinars to the Sultan.

By 1572-73, Yousuf Shah, the heir apparent, killed Ghazi Shah's son Aiba Khan as he was also a claimant to the throne and fled to Sopore with Muhammad Bhat in fear of the Sultan. Ali Shah became highly enraged and ordered his brother, Abdal Khan, to capture Yousuf. Both the parties came in a tough league but Sayyid Mubarak interceded and calmed the situation down. Yousuf was forgiven while Muhammad Bhat was thrown into the prison.

Shortly after this event, two nobles, Shams Duni and Muhammad Maraj started to create trouble in the state. Ali Shah sent a force against them but both of them took refuge with Sayyid Mubarak. On Sayyid's advice, both of them were forgiven.

=== Reducing Kishtwar ===
Kishtwar was a tributary of Kashmir for centuries but in 1572, Raja of Kishtwar Bahadur Singh renounced Ali Shah's suzerainty. To encounter Bahadur, Ali Shah sent three forces under Abdal Khan, Ali Khan and Nauruz Chak respectively. Kishtwar was invaded from all three sides and with no hope left, Bahadur surrendered and came to discussions. He accepted Ali Shah's suzerainty, agreed on paying tributes and sent his daughter in marriage to Ali Shah. She later accepted Islam and was known as Fath Khatun. In 1574, as Bahadur didn't pay the tributes again, Ali Shah sent Ismail Ganai against him but just like before, he agreed on paying the tribute regularly in future.

=== Threat from the Shah Mirs ===
In 1575-76, Haji Haidar Khan and Salim Khan, sons of Nazuk Shah, the former Shah Mir Sultan of Kashmir, made a plot to invade Kashmir. They've been living in exile in Punjab after the Chak upsurge and after assurance from some of the nobles of Kashmir, both of them set out towards the valley. When Ali Shah learned about the brothers reaching Nowshera, he sent a force under Lohar Chak and Muhammad Chak.

The events took a change as Muhammad imprisoned Lohar and joined the Shah Mirs. Ali Shah was greatly alarmed on this drastic move of Muhammad but Naji Malik assured him that Muhammad was a loyal servant and this proved right as Muhammad, after finding an opportunity, attacked the Shah Mirs when they were on their way to Rajauri. This raid proved fatal for the invaders as Salim was killed while Haidar escaped to India. After releasing Lohar, both the victorious commanders returned to Srinagar as champions.

=== Mughal Ambassadors ===
On 3 July 1578, Akbar sent Mulla Ishqi and Qazi Sadruddin as Mughal ambassadors to Kashmir with a royal proposal for marriage between Mughal Prince Salim and Husain Shah's daughter. The real reason behind this proposal was to determine the then current situation of Kashmir for an invasion. Ali Shah contentedly accepted the proposal and sent his niece with his wakil Muhammad Qasim. He also presented expensive gifts, shawls, musks and saffrons to the imperial court. He later struck coins and had the khutba read in the name of Akbar. The marriage between Salim and Husain's daughter was held in October 1592.

== Personal life ==
A humble and sophisticated character, Ali Shah held a modest and polite nature with great knowledge and wisdom. He followed Shia Islam and was referred to as an orthodox and practising Shia Muslim. His rule was just and considerate as the Sultan made sure that no one slept unfed. When the rabi crops failed in 1578 owing to the heavy fall of snow and caused famine in the country, he brought out his treasure and distributed it freely among the poor and needy. Never holding a grudge against anyone personally, he even forgave those who stood up against him. He also discontinued the practice of the blinding and cutting of limbs of political opponents prevalent since the time of Ghazi Shah. Making no sectarian differences between Sunnis and Shias, he respected and brought sufi saints and scholars from different order and fiqh to his court. Hamza Makhdum, Baba Daud Ganai, Baba Rishi Harvi, Sheikh Yaqub Sarfi and Khwaja Muhammad Rafiq are the prime examples.

Apart from the state authority, he had a great fondness of arts and literature, having musicians and poets in his court most of the time. He also took interest in chess and was specified as a prominent chess player. Other than indoor games, the Sultan took part in polo. He played it every morning and afternoon. Ali Shah married Fath Khatun to whom he later gave the title of Queen Consort of Kashmir.

== Death ==
One day in late 1578, during a game of polo, Ali Shah Chak was mortally injured. These injuries proved fatal and he died after a few days. Before dying, he entrusted all his property and the Sultanate into the hands of his young and naive son, Yousuf Shah.

After a civil interaction between Ali Shah's brother Abdal Chak and Yousuf, his final rites including his funeral were finally held. He was buried in Srinagar, Kashmir.

== Bibliography ==
• Hasan, Mohibbul (1959), Kashmir under the Sultans, Aakar Books, ISBN 978-81-87879-49-7

• Chadurah, Haidar Malik, Tarikh i Kashmir, Abe Books

• Abu-'l-Faḍl Ibn-Mubārak, Akbar Nama, Encyclopedia Iranica

• Niazumuddin Ahmad, Tabaqat-i-Akbari, Abe Books

• Abu-'l-Faḍl Ibn-Mubārak, Ain-i-Akbari, Rare Book Society of India
