= Shams Chak =

Kashmiri commander

Shams Khan Chak was a Kashmiri Commander from the Chak dynasty who became one of the main leaders during the Mughal conquest of Kashmir. He also led the Kashmiri army into the Battle of Hastivanj against the Mughal army.
