= Kashmir Civil War (1419–1420) =

War of succession in the Kashmir Sultanate

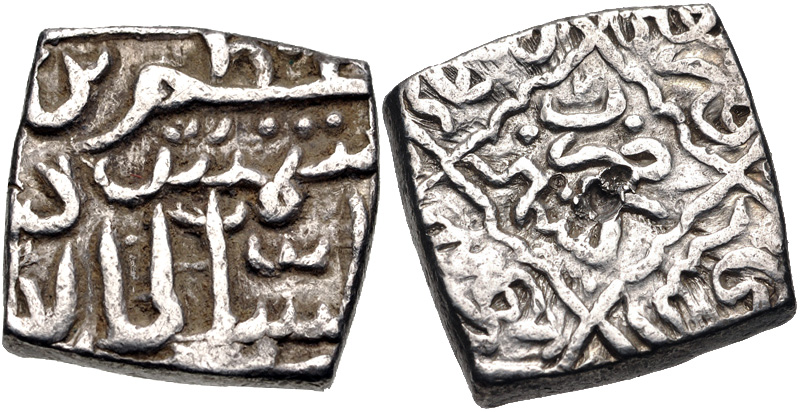
- Sasnu coin issued by Zainu'l-Abidin (c. 1460s)
Date	December 1419 – July 1420
Location	Kashmir Sultanate (primarily Srinagar, Uri and Thanna)
Result	Shahi Khan's victory: Shahi Khan is enthroned as Sultan of Kashmir as Zayn al-Abidin; Sialkot expands influence over Jammu; Rebellion of Jasrat takes momentum

Belligerents
Forces loyal to Shahi Khan; Khokhar Confederacy; Diplomatic support: Sindh Kingdom	Forces loyal to Ali Shah; Diplomatic support: Jammu Kingdom; Delhi Sultanate

Commanders and leaders
Shahi Khan; Jasrat Khokhar Fath Khan Samma	Ali Shah † (Note: According to contemporary Srivara. Later Persian chronicles state him to have fled alive) Bhim Dev; Khizr Khan

The Kashmir Civil War was a short-lived yet prominent war of succession over the throne of Kashmir that lasted from late 1419 until mid 1420. The conflict was a dynastic clash between Sultan Ali Shah and his younger brother Shahi Khan (Zainu'l-Abidin).

== Background ==
After the death of Sultan Sikandar in 1413, his eldest son, Ali Shah, ascended to the throne. However, Ali Shah's rule was marked by administrative inefficiency and dissatisfaction among the nobility. Shahi Khan, Sikandar's younger son, was appointed as the Wazir but quickly rose in influence due to his strong leadership and popularity. The rivalry between the two brothers became evident as Shahi Khan garnered support from key factions dissatisfied with Ali Shah's governance.

The civil war was driven by dynastic rivalry and Ali Shah's inability to maintain effective control over the Sultanate. His reliance on external alliances, particularly with Raja Bhim Dev of Jammu, further alienated segments of the Kashmiri nobility. Shahi Khan's growing support among military leaders and administrators intensified the conflict, as many saw him as a more capable ruler.

== Conflict ==
In 1419, Sultan Ali Shah left Srinagar under the pretext of performing the Hajj pilgrimage. However, instead of proceeding to Mecca, he sought military assistance from Raja Bhim Dev of Jammu, his father-in-law, to strengthen his claim to the throne. During Ali Shah's absence, Shahi Khan consolidated his position in Kashmir. He gained the support of local nobility, military commanders, and influential administrators, securing his control over Srinagar and the surrounding territories. In 1420, Ali Shah returned to Kashmir to reclaim his throne. Shahi Khan retired to Sialkot without any fight and anticipating the confrontation, sought the assistance of the Khokhars, a powerful tribal group under their leader Jasrat Khokhar.

=== Battle of Thanna ===
The decisive battle took place near Thanna (modern-day Thana Mandi) on 7 July 1420. Shahi Khan's forces, bolstered by the Khokhars, defeated Ali Shah's army. When the allied Kashmiri–Khokhar army reached Srinagar, dispute occurred between Shahi Khan and Jasrat as the latter intended to annex Kashmir into his own kingdom. Ultimately, both reached a friendship treaty according to which Shahi Khan would supply money and men to Jasrat for his conquest of Punjab. (Note: According to the Kashmiri historian Srivara, Jasrat had decided to annex Kashmir into his own kingdom but the vizier of former sultan, Muhammad Magisi revealed his intents, and Jasrat returned to Sialkot (Charak 1985, p. 74).)

=== Battle of Uri ===
Shortly after reaching Srinagar, Shahi Khan was challenged by Ali Shah again who returned at the head of an army provided by Raja Bhim Dev of Jammu. Shahi Khan, via Baramulla, met Ali Shah in Uri and defeated him once again. Contemporary accounts suggest that Ali Shah was killed in the battle, although some sources claim he either fled and went into exile or was imprisoned in Gulibagh fort where he died in 1423.

== Aftermath ==
After the two battles, Shahi Khan returned to Srinagar and was crowned as Sultan, taking the title Zayn al-Abidin which was given to him by Ali Shah before going for the pilgrimage. His accession marked the end of the civil war and the beginning of a transformative period in the Kashmiri history.

Zayn al-Abidin's reign (1420–1470) is considered to be the golden age of the Kashmir Sultanate. He reversed many of Sultan Sikandar's harsh policies, promoted religious tolerance, and fostered economic and cultural growth. His policies brought stability and prosperity to Kashmir, earning him the title Budshah (The Great King).
