= Jasrat =

Punjabi chieftain and folk hero (1375–1442)

- Malik; Raja

Raja of Sialkot
- Reign: c. 1410 – 1442
- Predecessor: Shaikha
- Successor: Bahlul Lodi
- Born: c. 1375; Sialkot, Delhi Sultanate (modern-day Punjab, Pakistan)
- Died: 1442; Jammu (modern-day Jammu and Kashmir, India)
- Burial: Kurree Sharif, Punjab 32.701854°N 74.455594°E
- Spouse: Daughter of Bhim Dev, Raja of Jammu; Daughter of Manik Dev
- Father: Shaikha
- Religion: Sunni Islam

Jasrat, (Note: Punjabi: جسرتھ; pronounced [d͡ʒəsɾət kʰoːkʰər]) (c. 1375 – 1442) also known as Jasrath, was a 15th-century Punjabi Muslim chieftain who ruled parts of Punjab from 1410 until his death in 1442. He had his capital at Sialkot.

A son of Shaikha, Jasrat fought against Timur during his invasion of Delhi Sultanate in 1398. He was defeated and made captive but regained his power after getting free. Jasrat supported Shahi Khan against Ali Shah and obtained significant spoils after his victory in the Battle of Thanna. In 1423 he conquered Jammu after defeating its ruler Bhim Dev. Encouraged by the early victories, Jasrat aimed for Delhi and invaded the Delhi Sultanate several times between 1421 and 1432. Although mostly unsuccessful in these campaigns, Jasrat managed to expand his control over most of Punjab and Jammu as well as parts of present-day Himachal Pradesh. He is considered a folk hero in Punjab.

== Sources ==
Information regarding Jasrat comes from a variety of sources from neighbouring polities, most of which were hostile to him and are often contradictory. Among his contemporary sources are Rajatarangini of Jonaraja and his pupil Shrivara, the court historians of Kashmiri sultan Zain ul-Abidin, Tarikh-i-Mubarak Shahi of Yahyā Sirhindi, the court historian of Sayyid sultan Mubarak Shah and Zafarnama of Sharaf al-Din Yazdi, the court historian of Timurid sultan Ibrahim. Other notable sources describing his life include Muntakhib-ut-Tawarikh by ʽAbd al-Qadir Badayuni (1540–1615), Tarikh-e-Firishta by Firishta (1570–1623), and Tabaqat-i-Akbari by Nizamuddin Ahmad (1551–1621), as well as 19th century work Rājdarshani by Ganesh Das. A few other sources providing minor details regarding Jasrat include Malfuzat-i-Timuri (probably written in 17th century), anonymous Tarikh-i-Kashmir (written 1590) and Baharistan-i-Shahi (written 1614), and Ain-i-Akbari (written 1596) of Abul Fazl.

The conflict of Jasrat with Timur is narrated in Zafarnama of Yazdi and Tarikh-i-Mubarak Shahi of Sirhindi. His relationship with Kashmiri sultans and involvement in the Kashmir civil war is described in sufficient detail in Rajatarangini (which names him Mallīk Jasrath, the chief of Khuhkarā), as well as by Sirhindi. Account of his battles with Sayyid dynasty is found in a number of chronicles, but in most detail in Tarikh-i-Mubarak Shahi. However, Tarikh-i-Mubarak Shahi terminates in 1434, and for his later events and death we have to rely on the later 17th century sources.

== Background ==
Although Firishta calls Jasrat a Gakhar, he is believed by most historians to be a Khokhar instead. He was born to a local chieftain, Shaikha in c. 1375, during a time when Delhi Sultanate was in decline due to civil war among members of Tughlaq dynasty. (Note: Sirhindi calls Jasrat as Jasrath Shaikha Khokhar, which indicates that he was a son of Shaikha. Badaoni also calls him son of Shaikha (Khan 2023, p. 56). K. S. Lal, however believes him to be a brother of Shaikha, as stated by Ferishta and Sharafuddin (Lal 1958)) In historical accounts, Jasrat has also been called as Jasrat Shaikha, hence the events of both chieftains have been sometimes confused. (Note: The name Shaikha itself may have been a generic title of tribal chieftains of Punjab during medieval period.) In the late 14th century, Khokhars controlled the territory between the Salt Range (Kuh-i-Jud) and Sirmur in Himachal Pradesh, and were usually in a state of conflict with the Delhi sultans as well as neighbouring rulers in Kashmir and Jammu. Owing to the anarchy prevailing in the Delhi Sultanate, Shaikha conquered Lahore as well from the Tughlaq sultans in 1394.

== Early life ==
Little is known about the early life of Jasrat Khokhar. He first came to prominence during the invasion of Timur in 1398–99. Jasrat Khokhar opposed him with a force of 2,000 at river Sutlej between Tulamba and Dipalpur, but was defeated and made captive, later being taken to Samarkand. Shaikha Khokhar was also killed by Tamerlane when he captured Lahore. Timur then proceeded to sack Delhi, and brutally massacred its citizens.

Jasrat Khokhar managed to escape and returned to Punjab after Timur died in 1405. With the alliance of sultan Sikandar Shah Miri of Kashmir, he re-established his control over northern Punjab. He was sent by Sultan Sikander to sack the city of Jammu during the reign of its Raja, Pala Deo (Pala Dev), and spent the next few years quietly, consolidating his control over Bhimber and Pothohar.

== Military campaigns ==
=== Battle of Thanna (1420) ===
In 1420, a civil war erupted between Sultan of Kashmir, Ali Shah and the claimant to throne Shahi Khan. Ali Shah defeated Shahi Khan with the help of Bhim Dev, Raja of Jammu and his father-in-law, and expelled him from Kashmir. Shahi Khan went to Sialkot to ask Jasrat for help, who decided to support him. Hearing this, Ali Shah marched with his army to Sialkot. The two sides met at Thanna and in the ensuing battle, Ali Shah's army was routed and he was himself killed by Jasrat. This battle greatly increased the prestige and wealth of Jasrat. When the allied army reached Srinagar, dispute occurred between Shahi Khan and Jasrat as the latter intended to annex Kashmir into his own kingdom. Ultimately, both reached a friendship treaty according to which Shahi Khan would supply money and men to Jasrat for his conquest of Punjab. (Note: According to the Kashmiri historian Srivara, Jasrat had decided to annex Kashmir into his own kingdom but the vizier of former sultan, Muhammad Magisi revealed his intents, and Jasrat returned to Sialkot (Charak 1985, p. 74).) With the help of Jasrat, Shahi Khan was enthroned as sultan Zain-ul-Abidin.

=== Invasions of Delhi sultanate ===
In 1414, the Tughlaq dynasty was replaced by dynasty of Khizr Khan. However, he could not stop the decline of the sultanate. Jasrat aimed to conquer Delhi, and after death of Khizr Khan in May 1421, crossed the Ravi River. He successively conquered Ludhiana and Jalandhar and proceeded to besiege Sirhind. In October 1421, Sultan Mubarak Shah marched against Jasrat, who after a skirmish at Rupar, retreated to his kingdom. Due to his old enmity with Jasrat, Raja of Jammu Bhim Dev greatly aided Mubarak Shah in his campaign. Bhim Dev also destroyed Jasrat's stronghold of Tilhar at Rajouri in January 1422. In May 1422, Jasrat again invaded the sultanate and this time besieged Lahore, but was unable to take it by storm. With the help of Raja Bhim, Delhi army invaded his domains and Jasrat again retreated in September 1422.

=== Invasion of Jammu (1423) ===
Due to the support Bhim Dev had been providing to the Delhi sultanate, Jasrat set out from his stronghold of Rajouri and invaded Jammu in April 1423 and ravaged the region. Bhim Dev was killed in a battle and Jasrat married one of his daughters, as well as captured a large amount of wealth and arms from him. Following invasion of Jammu, Manik Dev was appointed as its new Raja. (Note: The sources provide different names for Manik Dev: Mal Dev (Jonaraja), Manak Dev (Srivara), Malak Dev (Firishta), and Ajeo Dev (Rajdarshani) (Parmu 1969, p. 166).)

After the conquest of Jammu, Jasrat raised a contingent of Mongol mercenaries and sacked Dipalpur and plundered suburbs of Lahore, after which he returned with bounty to his domains as usual. In August 1428, Jasrat again marched against Delhi sultanate. He besieged Kalanor, and completely sacked Jalandhar. However, he was defeated by governor of Lahore Sikander Tohfa at the bank of river Beas near Kangra and retreated to Tilhar, leaving the war spoils back. This failure disappointed Jasrat, who realised that he lacked sufficient power to conquer Delhi. Thus, he started negotiations with Shaikh Ali, the Timurid governor of Kabul. However, when Shaikh Ali ultimately invaded Punjab in 1430, Jasrat did not aid him, although many other Khokhar leaders, including his nephew Khajeka had joined Shaikh Ali.

After Shaikh Ali was defeated by Delhi armies, Jasrat again invaded the sultanate in 1431. He conquered Jalandhar and defeated Sikander Tohfa, taking him away as captive. Sikander was released after paying heavy ransom. Jasrat next besieged Lahore for several months during 1431–32. By this time, the influence of Delhi Sultanate had heavily diminished in Punjab, and the region was in the hands of rebels. By February 1432, Mubarak Shah moved with a large army against Jasrat and other rebels. Jasrat raised the siege of Lahore in July and left for Tilhar after making Jalandhar part of his domains. Later, when the governor of Lahore Allahdad Kaka invaded Jasrat's territories in 1432 to re-gain charge of Jalandhar he was defeated at Bajwara and fled.

=== Battles with Afghans ===
In 1431, Sikander Tohfa allied with Jasrat against the Afghans who had firmly based themselves at Sirhind. Jasrat and Sikander easily captured Sirhind, but Afghans had already left and moved to the hills. There many of them, including Bahlol Khan Lodi's relatives, were massacred by both and others were made captives. After 1436, Jasrat fought battles against Bahlol Khan, who had re-established himself at Sirhind by bringing all Afghans under his banner. The alliance of Jasrat and Sikander saw success as Bahlol Khan was compelled to retreat towards the Siwalik foothills. But when Muhammad Shah left Delhi to invade Jasrat's domains in 1441 and appointed Bahlol Khan as governor of Sirhind to combat him, he made peace with Bahlol and advised him to capture the throne of Delhi for himself. Unlike Jasrat, who was viewed as an outsider by Delhi nobles, Bahlol was a part of the nobility and had better prospect of gaining the throne of Delhi. In return of his support, Bahlol ceded the region between Chenab and Jhelum (Chaj Doab) to Jasrat and agreed to not interfere in his territories. Sultan Zain ul-Abidin acted as witness to the peace treaty between both.

== Death ==
Jasrat died in 1442, said by some historians to have been murdered by his Dogri queen to avenge her father Bhim Dev's death. According to a 15th century Dogri poem, this event took place at the bank of a river in Jammu. (Note: On the other hand, a later Persian chronicle Rajdarshani states that he was assassinated by his personal attendant Bhan and his courtesan Mina Kanizak, who was from Jammu, after a conspiracy by the Raja of Jammu, Biram Dev (Charak 1985, p. 78).) By the time of his death, Jasrat had succeeded in conquering most of Punjab and Jammu, and ruled over Duggar, including region from Sirmur in Himachal Pradesh to Shivalik (Murree Hills) in Potohar, and north-central Punjab. He also constructed or re-fortified several forts in the region under his rule. His descendants, however, could not keep control over his conquered regions and lost them to the Lodi dynasty by 1470. By the time of invasion of Babur in 1526, they had lost Potohar as well to the Gakhars.

== Personal life ==
Like sultans of Kashmir, Jasrat also married into the Dogra Dev dynasty of Jammu. He married the daughter of Bhim Dev's successor, Manakdeo (Manik Dev) as well. Raja Manik Dev's two other daughters were married to Sultan Zain ul-Abidin of Kashmir, and became mothers of his sons Haider Shah and Hasan Shah. In this way, he had matrimonial ties with the rulers of Jammu and Kashmir. Jasrat also maintained good relations with the custodians of the Shrine of Baba Farid, with whom Khokhars had a close political alliance. According to Jawahir-i-Faridi (written 1652), one of his daughters was married to the then custodian and a descendant of Baba Farid, Shiekh Faizullah. Jasrat was a vital ally for sultan Zain-ul-Abidin, and took shelter in the Kashmir valley several times during his campaigns in Punjab. After 1432, he undertook only two further campaigns against Delhi sultans, and became neutral in the power struggle within the sultanate.

== Legacy ==
The strongest opposition to Delhi sultanate in Punjab was offered by Jasrat. He spent two decades fighting against Delhi sultans whilst keeping most of Punjab independent from their rule. According to the Tarikh-i-Mubarak Shahi of his contemporary Yahya Sirhindi, Jasrat aspired to capture the throne of Delhi. Sirhindi further adds that in spite of repeated failure, his spirit remained high, and he continued to be a thorn in the flesh of Delhi Sultans for many years. His invasions had proved disastrous for the ruling Sayyid dynasty, and his neutrality and subsequent death in 1442 facilitated the establishment of Lodi dynasty in 1451 to some extent.

A Dogri language historic novel "Veer Jasrath Khokhar" is based on his life. In Punjab, he is seen favourably due to his resistance against both Timur and the Delhi sultans. The historian K. S. Lal, after analysing his career, calls Jasrat a brave warrior and a reckless adventurer, who led more than a dozen campaigns against Delhi sultanate but lacked sufficient resources and political support within the sultanate to conquer it.
