= Islam in the Kashmir Valley =

Islam is the majority religion practised in the Kashmir Valley, with 97.16% of the region's population identifying as Muslims as of 2014. The religion came to the region with the arrival of Mir Sayyid Ali Hamadani, a Muslim Sufi preacher from Central Asia and Persia, beginning in the early 14th century. The majority of Kashmiri Muslims are Sunni Muslims.

They refer to themselves as "Koshur" in their mother language. Non-Kashmiri Muslims in Kashmir include semi-nomadic cowherds and shepherds, belonging to the Gurjar and Bakarwal communities.

== Historical development ==
=== Early period of Islamic contact ===
During the 8th century, the Kingdom of Kashmir was subjected to several attacks aimed at its conquest. Several attempts to conquer Kashmir were made by the Arabs who had established themselves in Sindh (711-13 C.E), under the leadership of Muhammad bin Qasim. But Muhammad bin Qasim was recalled by the Umayyad Caliph to Damascus, thus averting the possible invasion. In the reign of Caliph Hisham (724-43 C.E), the Arabs again marched towards Kashmir under the leadership of ambitious and energetic leadership of the governor Junaid. Lalitaditya Muktapida (724–60 CE), the Raja (ruler) of Kashmir, defeated Junaid and overran his kingdom. However, this victory was not decisive as further attempts to invade were made by the Arabs, but Lalitaditya was able to stem the tide of these advances. A last attempt at the invasion of the Kashmir Kingdom was made by Hisham ibn 'Amr al-Taghlibi, the Governor of Sindh, appointed by Caliph Mansur (754-75 C.E). Though he reached as far as the southern slopes of the Himalayas, which were a part of the Kashmir Kingdom, he failed to enter and occupy the valley.

After the Arabs, it was the Ghaznavids who attempted to conquer Kashmir. Mahmud of Ghazni, defeated Raja Jaipal (1002 C.E), the ruler of Hindu Shahi (near Peshawar, in modern-day Pakistan). Anandpal, the son and successor of Jaipal, also suffered a crushing defeat at the hands of Mahmud in 1009 C.E., and died a few years later. Anandpal's son Trilochanpala, whose power of influence was now confined only to the Salt Range, appealed to Samgrāmarāja (1003–28 C.E), the king of Kashmir, for help against Mahmud. A large army contingent was sent by Samgramaraja, who joined Trilochanpala's forces, however their combined forces were defeated by Mahmud in 1014 C.E. Mahmud advanced towards Kashmir and tried entering the kingdom via the Toshamaidan Pass. His progress was checked by the strong Loharkot Fort, which he besieged for a month. Owing to the heavy snowfall, which cut off Mahmud's communications, he was compelled to retreat. However, the Sultan again set out to invade Kashmir in September–October 1021 C.E, but was again compelled to retreat due to bad weather conditions.

=== Establishment of Muslim rule and conversion to Islam ===
After Sultan Mahmud's attempted conquests, Kashmir remained generally unaffected by invasions that were aimed at the plains of India, up until 1320 C.E. The Loharas (1003–1320 C.E.) ruled during this period, and was the last of the Hindu dynasties of Kashmir. In the spring of 1320, a Mongol chieftain by the name of Zulju, invaded Kashmir via the Jhelum Valley route. Suhadeva (1301–20 C.E), last ruler of the Loharas, tried to organise resistance, but failed due to his unpopularity among the masses. The reason for this unpopularity was financial exaction and general misrule that prevailed during the end period of the Lohara Dynasty. Zulju's invasion created havoc and Suhadeva fled to Kistwar. Rinchana, son of a Ladakhi chief, who was employed by Ramachandra (Prime Minister of Kashmir) to establish law and order, took advantage of the chaos. He got Ramachandra murdered, occupied the Kashmir throne by the end of the year 1320, and ruled until his death in 1323 C.E. In order to gain acceptance of Kashmiris, he married Kota Rani, the daughter of Ramachandra, and made Rawanchandra (Ramachandra's son) his commander-in-chief.

Rinchan converted to Islam after coming into contact with Sayyid Sharfudin, a Sufi preacher commonly known as Bulbul Shah, who had come to Kashmir during the reign of Suhadeva. He changed his name to Sultan Sardarudin Shah after converting to Islam and thus became the first Muslim ruler of Kashmir. Following the conversion of Rinchan, his commander in chief also became Muslim. The royal patronage for Islam won it new converts and according to one source, many Kashmiris embraced the creed of Bulbul Shah.

The period after Sultan Sardarudin's death was marked by chaos and power tussle. Udayanadeva, the brother of Suhadeva, was made the ruler after an agreement among the nobles. However, he proved to be incompetent, and it was Kota Rani who was the virtual ruler. Soon after Udayanadeva's accession, a foreign chieftain attacked Kashmir, but the invaders were successfully repelled and defeated. However, the administration again fell into chaos. Udayanadeva had fled the country in sight of the attack, and lost his prestige in the eyes of the nobles. He died in the year 1338 C.E, and Kota Rani ascended the throne. But, Shah Mir, a nobleman employed earlier by Suhadeva, had other ambitions. A period of battle ensued between him and Kota Rani, and in 1339 C.E, Shah Mir captured the throne.

The Shahmiri Dynasty (1339- 1561 C.E), founded by Sultan Shah Mir, ruled Kashmir for the next 222 years. Various Sufi saints including Bulbul Shah, Shah e Hamdan, Nund Rishi popularised Islam in the valley through their moderate Sufi ideologies.

== Reign of Sikander Shah Miri ==
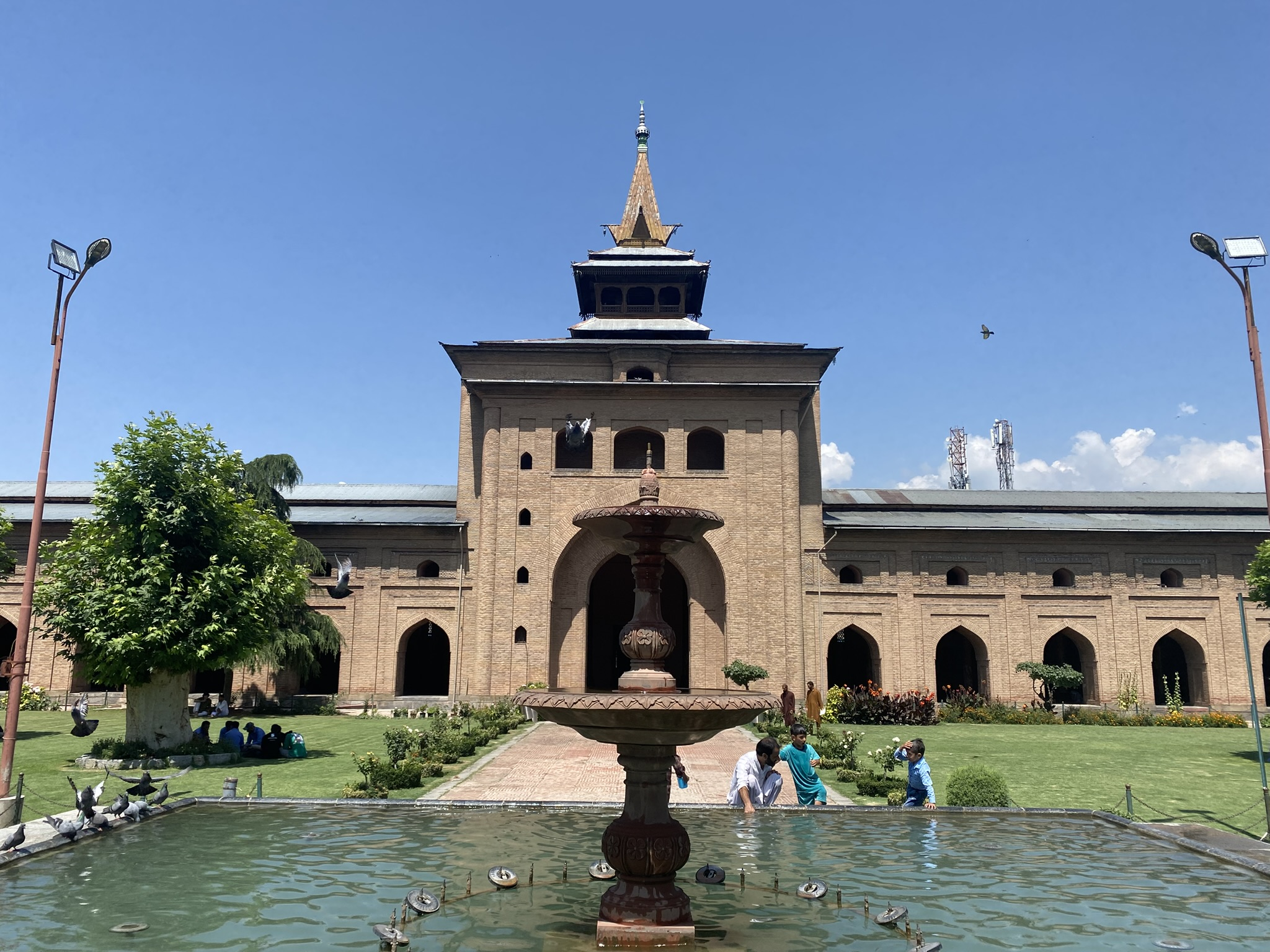
Jamia Masjid, Srinagar, commissioned by Sikandar. Rebuilt in 1677.

Sikandar Shah Miri is held to have ushered in the Islamisation of elite politics, which set the path for a largely irreversible change in post-Sikandar Kashmir.

His reign, lasting from 1389–1413 CE, terminated the long-standing syncretic and tolerant culture of Kashmir, and in its rigorous abidance by Sharia, severely oppressed the Kashmiri Hindu population. Music, dance, gambling, intoxicants etc were prohibited and the office of Shaikhu'l-Islam was established to enforce these rules. Brahmans were forcibly converted, Hindu and Buddhist shrines of worship were destroyed, Sanskrit literature were purged, Jizya was imposed for those who objected to the abolition of hereditary varnas, and caste marks were prohibited.

Sikandar commissioned the Jamia Masjid at Srinagar, a monumental building completed in 1402 CE.

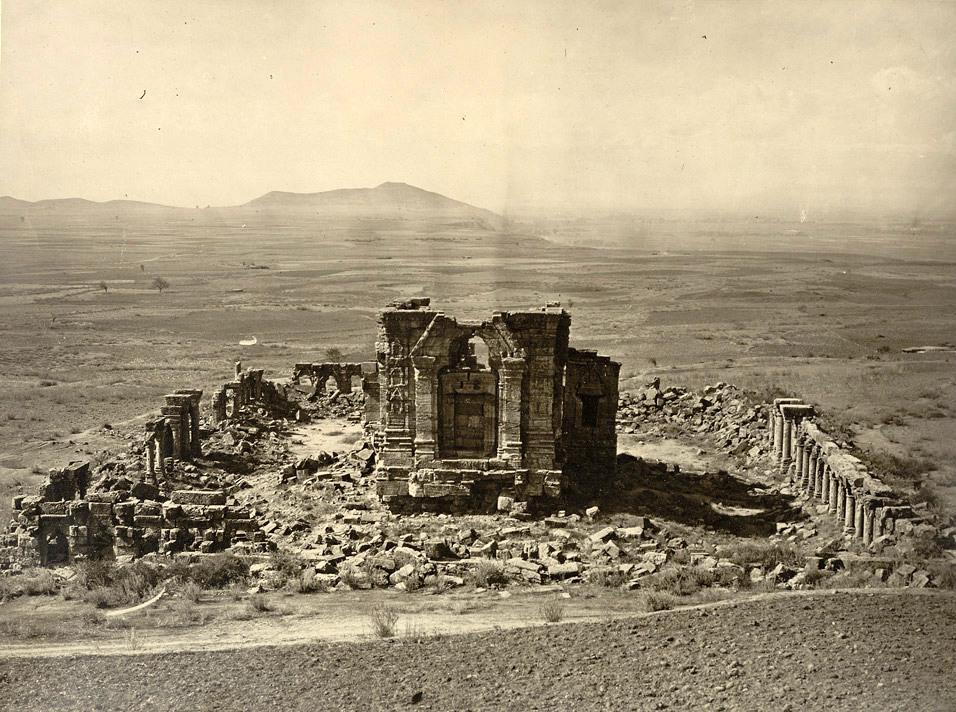
Ruins of the Martand Sun Temple, razed by Sikandar. (The extensive damage seen in the photo is also a product of several earthquakes; photo taken by John Burke in 1868.)

=== Motivations and analysis ===
Upon a literary reading of Rajatarangini, Sikandar's zeal behind the Islamisation of society is attributable to a Sufi preacher Mir Muhammad Hamadani (or Sayyid Hamadani) who arrived in the region from Hamadan (present-day Iran) and stayed for about 12 years during his term, advocating for the creation of a monolithic society based on Islam as the common denominator. Sayyid Hamadani was one of exiles driven out by Amir Temur. He was accompanied by about 700 of his followers to Kashmir. Sikandar's counsel, a neo-Brahman-convert, Suhabhatta (var. Saifuddin) is held to have played the guiding role in the execution of those exclusionary orthodox policies by "instigating" the Sultan. (Note: Suhabhatta's daughter was also married off to Mir Hamadani.) Baharistan-i-shahi as well as Tohfatu'l-Ahbab deemed Sikandar as the noblest ruler, who cleaned Kashmir of "infidels and heretics" on Hamadani's influence.

Chitralekha Zutshi, Richard G. Salomon and others however reject that there were purely religious motives behind Sikandar's actions and calls for a nuanced contextual reading of Rajatarangini, in that it was commissioned by his successor, wishing to bring back the Brahminical elite into the royal fold and (simultaneously) strove to establish Sanskrit as an integral part of the vernacularising world of the cosmopolitan Sultanate. Sikandar's policies were guided by realpolitik and, like with the previous Hindu rulers, essentially an attempt to secure political legitimacy by asserting state-power over Brahmans and gaining access to wealth controlled by Brahminical institutions. Walter Slaje disagrees, in part, given the differential rituals of destruction undertaken by Hindu and Muslim kings with the latter specifically rendering sites inoperable for long passage of time by massive pollution or outright conversion but he concludes that the fierce opposition of Hindus to Muslim rulers (including Sikandar) primarily stemmed from their aversion to the slow disintegration of caste-society under Islamic influence.
