= Taj Khatoon =

Kashmiri empress (1400–1468)

Empress consort of Kashmir
- Tenure: 1421 – 1468
- Born: Sayyida Taj Baihaqi c. 1400; Srinagar, Kashmir Sultanate
- Died: 1468 (aged 67–68); Srinagar, Kashmir Sultanate
- Burial: Mazar-i-Kalān, Malkha Cemetery, Srinagar
- Spouse: Zayn al-Abidin (m. 1421)
- Issue: two daughters
- House: Baihaqi (by birth); Shah Mir (by marriage)
- Father: Sayyid Muhammad Baihaqi

Taj Khatoon (also spelt Khatun; born Sayyida Taj Baihaqi; c. 1400–1468) was the Empress consort of Kashmir as the wife of Sultan Zayn al-Abidin. She was the daughter of Sayyid Muhammad Baihaqi, a leading noble of the Kashmir Sultanate who helped Zayn al-Abidin ascend the throne in the Civil War of 1419–1420.

Srivara refers to her as Bodha Khatoon. Following her marriage and becoming the queen, she became known as Makhduma Khatun, the name also inscribed on her gravestone. She was also know as Baihaqi Begum.

During the reign of her husband, Taj Khatoon was a patron of education. She donated her valuable necklace to Madrasat-ul Ulum, a school founded by Zayn al-Abidin in Sialkot.

She was buried in the Mazar-i-Kalān (also known as Graveyard of Bahauddin GanjBakhsh) adjacent to Malkha Cemetery, Srinagar.
