= Mazar-i-Salatin =

Historic royal cemetery in Srinagar

- Interactive map of Mazar-i-Salatin

Details
- Established: 15th century
- Location: Zaina Kadal, Srinagar
- Coordinates: 34.0949769°N 74.8061305°E
- Type: Historic royal cemetery

Mazar-i-Salatin (Note: Persian: مزارِ سلاطین (Mazār-i-Salatīn)) (lit. 'Cemetery of Sultans') is a historic cemetery associated with rulers and nobility of the Shah Mir dynasty of the Kashmir Sultanate. It is situated within the premises of the Mausoleum built by Sultan Zayn al-Abidin for his mother, on the right bank of the Jhelum River in Maharaj Ganj, near Zaina Kadal, Srinagar, Jammu and Kashmir.

== History ==
The cemetery is traditionally attributed to Sultan Sikandar, during whose reign it was established.

Following the burial of Zayn al-Abidin, his son Haider Shah endowed the village of Solur, identified in present-day Ganderbal, for the maintenance of the cemetery, according to the accounts of Srivara in his Zaina Rajatarangini.

== Burials ==
=== Royal burials ===
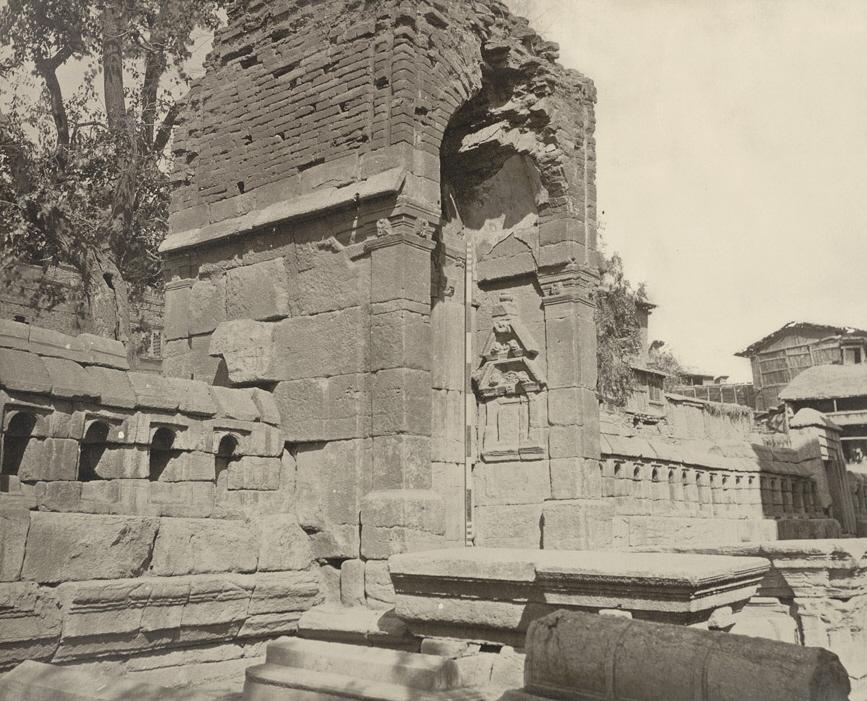
Gateway of the enclosure of Mazar-i-Salatin, containing Zayn al-Abidin's tomb. Photographed in 1866

Sultan Sikandar and his son Zayn al-Abidin are among the early royal figures in the cemetery. Zayn al-Abidin's grave is situated besides that of his father. Historical accounts describe the tomb as more prominent than those of his predecessors and mention Persian inscriptions on its gravestone. The state of his grave is in deteriorated state. Historian R.K. Parmu wrote that he was unable to locate an inscription of the grave despite searching the cemetery. He noted that the graves were made of black polished stone and described the stone associated with Zayn al-Abidin's grave lacking a crown. A contemporary of Zayn al-Abidin Srivara in his Zaina Rajatarangini reports an epitaph bearing an inscription and a long crystal at Zayn al-Abidin's grave. According to another account reported by Zareef Ahmad Zareef, Zayn al-Abidin's grave was originally made of moonstone sent by the King of China, but the stone was alter stolen during Sikh rule in Kashmir.

The cemetery also contains the grave of Habib Shah, the last ruler of Shah Miri dynasty. The Kashir encyclopaedia notes a Persian inscription on the grave which indicates that earlier he might have been buried elsewhere.

=== Grave of Mirza Haidar Dughlat ===
This cemetery is the burial place of Mirza Haidar Dughlat, a Chagatai Turco-Mongol military general and governor of Kashmir, and a cousin of Babur. He was also the author of the historical work Tarikh-i-Rashidi. The inscription on his epitaph indicates the year of death to 957 AH (15510–1551 CE).

In 1823, his grave was repaired at the initiation of William Moorcroft, a veterinarian and explorer employed by the East Indian Company. A stone slab bearing a Persian inscription was installed by Izzatullah Khan, an associate of Moorcroft.

In January 2018, Mirza Haidar's grave was again restored. The restoration project was initiated by the Embassy of Kazakhstan in India with support of Archeologically survey of India.

=== Other Burials ===
The cemetery is also associated with several scholars, religious figures and officials. According to the Kashir Encyclopedia, these include Maulana Kamal (d. 1463), a scholar during Zayn al-Abidin's reign; Dawud bin Qazi Muhammad (d. 1468), a qazi (jurist); Daulat Mir (d. 1398); Muhammad Saleh; Maulana Ishaq (d. 1467); Hafiz Kamal (1494) a Quran memorizer, imam and khatib and Imam and Khatib; and Baba Usman Uchap Ganai, among other.

Although the cemetery was reserved and associated with royalty and nobles. The Cemetery now has become public burial ground, wit the number of graves increasing.

== Tomb of Budshah's mother ==
Tomb of Zayn al-Abidin's mother

Around 1870

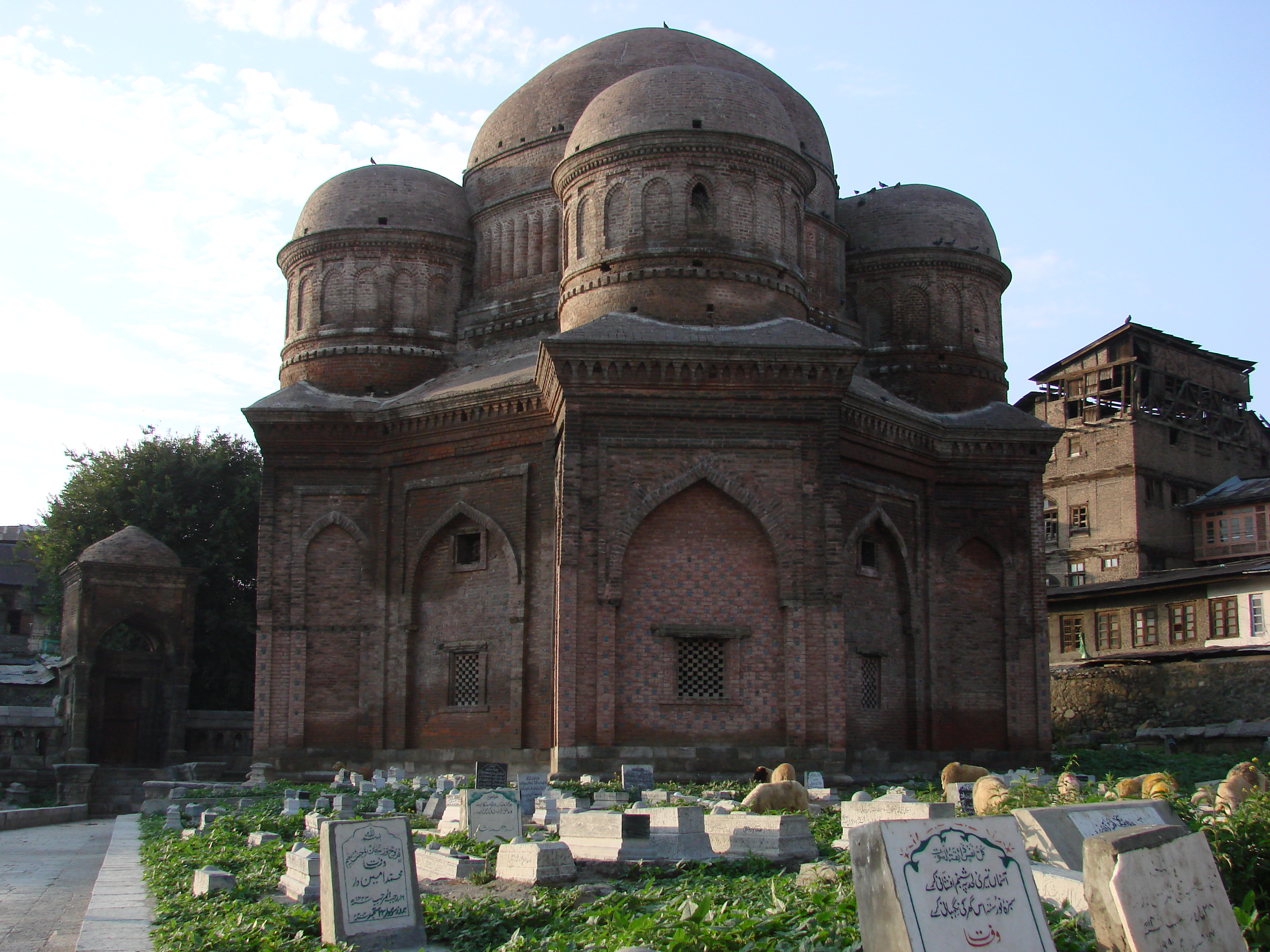
In 2007

The mausoleum of Sultan Zayn al-Abidin's mother, locally known as Budshah's Dumath, is situated near Zaina Kadal in Srinagar, within the Mazar-i-Salatin cemetery. She is identified in some accounts as Mera. The monument is regarded as one of the oldest surviving Muslim structures in Srinagar.

Dating to the 15th-century, the brick mausoleum consists of a central domed chamber surrounded by four smaller cupolas. Its architectural features include glazed blue brickwork, arches, squinches and decorative mouldings, reflecting Persianate and Timurid influences. The central dome consists of two separate shells.

The building stands on a raised plinth whose origins have been associated with an earlier religious structure. Percy Brown and W. H. Nicholas argued that the plinth had remained largely undisturbed, although interpretations of its original form and subsequent adaptation differ.

The monument has undergone conservation work under the Archaeological Survey of India, including restoration during the early 20th century. However, it remains in a deteriorating condition.

== Notable Burials ==
- Sikandar Shah (d. 1413), 7th Sultan of Kashmir.
- Zayn al-Abidin (d. 1470), 9th Sultan of Kashmir.
- Hassan Shah (d. 1484), 11th Sultan of Kashmir.
- Baba Uchap Ganai (d. 15th century), Sufi mystic.
- Mirza Haidar Dughlat (d. 1551), military commander and historian.
- Habib Shah (d. 1573), the last Sultan of the Shah Mir Dynasty.

== See also ==
- Malkha Cemetery
- Mazar-e-Shura
- Sheikh bagh cemetery

== Source ==
- Taing, Muhammad Yusuf (1986). Kạ̄šur Ensāyiklōpīḍiyā: Ās̱ār-e Qadīmah tɨ Fan-e Taʿmīr کٲشر انسائیکلوپیڈیا: آثارِ قدیٖمَہ تٕہ فنِ تعمیر [Kashmiri Encyclopedia: Ancient Remains and Architecture] (in Kashmiri). Vol. 1 (new ed.). Jammu and Kashmir Academy of Art, Culture and Languages. pp. 212–220.
- Sufi, G.M.D. (1944). Kashir: A history of Kashmir (PDF). Vol. 1. Lahore: University of the Punjab.
- Hasan, Mohibbul (2002). Kashmir Under the Sultans. Edited and introduced by Hamid Naseem Rafiabadi. Gulshan Publishers. ISBN 81-86714- 55-3.
- Anonymous (1991). Pandit, Kashinath (ed.). Bahāristān-i-Shāhī: A Chronicle of Mediaeval Kashmir. Translated from Persian by K. N. Pandit. Calcutta: Firma KLM Private Limited. ISBN 9788188643837.
- Srivara (October 1994). Śrīvara's Zaina Rājataraṅgiṇī. Translated by Dhar, Kashi Nath. New Delhi: Indian Council of Historical Research and People's Publishing House. ISBN 81-7007-189-5.
- Parmu, R.K. (August 1969). A History of Muslim Rule in Kashmir 1320–1819. People's Publishing house.
