= Maulana Kabir =

15th-century Academic administrator of Kashmir

Shaykh al-Islām Maulana Kabir
- Born: Kashmir Valley, Kashmir Sultanate
- Died: 15th-century Naushahr, Srinagar, Kashmir Sultanate
- Burial place: Mulla Kabir Cemetery, Nowshera, Srinagar; 34°07′38″N 74°48′19″E
- Occupation: Academic administrator
- Era: 15th-century
- Notable work: Commentary on Sharh-i-Mulla
- Title: Shaykh al-Islām

Religious life
- Religion: Islam

Muslim leader
- Influenced: Zayn al-Abidin the Great

Maulana Kabir (also known as Mulla Kabir Nahwi) was a 15th-century Kashmiri Islamic scholar, theologian, and academic administrator during the reign of Sultan Zayn al-Abidin (r. 1420–1470 CE) in the Kashmir Valley. He served as tutor to the Sultan and was later appointed Shaykh al-Islam and rector of the Dar-ul-Ulum, a residential university established by the Sultan in the capital, Naushahr (present-day Nowshera in Srinagar).

== Early life and education ==
Maulana Kabir was born in the Kashmir valley. He is primarily documented in historical chronicles as a polymath and tutor to the young prince Shahi Khan, who later ascended the throne as Sultan Zayn al-Abidin.

Historical accounts indicate that Maulana Kabir left Kashmir and moved to Herat for a period in the reign of Sikandar Shah Miri to pursue advanced studies in the fields of fiqh, hadith, tafsir and languages. However, Zayn al-Abidin invited him to return to Kashmir after ascending the throne.

== Educational Administration ==
After returning to Kashmir, Maulana Kabir was appointed Shaykh al-Islam.

Zayn al-Abidin subsequently established the Dar-ul-Ulum, a residential university near his newly built royal palace at Naushahr, and appointed Maulana Kabir as its rector while also providing residential accommodation for him. The institution, sometimes referred to by modern historians as the University of Naushahr, was subsidized through state patronage. The institution additionally served as a hub for the translation of Sanskrit and Arabic texts into Persian. Zayn al-Abidin assigned jagirs (land grants) to provide stipends for the students and expenditure of the institution.

Alongside Maulana Kabir, various other scholars including Mulla Ahmad Kashmiri, Mulla Hafiz Baghdadi, Mulla Parsa Bukhari, Mulla Jamal-ud-din Khar-Zami, Mir Ali Bokhari, and Mulla Yousuf Rashidi served as educators at the Dar-ul-Ulum. The Sultan is reported to have attended Maulana Kabir's lectures at the institution.

Maulana Kabir is also credited with having written commentary on Sharh-i-Mulla.

== Cemetery ==
Following his death, Maulana Kabir was buried near the site where the Dar-ul-Ulum once stood in Nowshera. His burial ground, known as the Mazar of Mulla Kabir or Malla Kabir Graveyard, still survives in Nowshera, Srinagar. Characterized by Kashmir's Sultanate-period funerary architecture, the site features large reused stone blocks and a Timurid-influenced brick gateway, or pishtaq. Modern descriptions note that the site remains relatively neglected and overgrown with elm and mulberry trees.

Other notable scholars of the area buried near his grave include Mulla Hasan Afaqi and Mulla Hafiz Baghdadi.

== Sources ==
- Sufi, G.M.D. (1979), Islamic Culture in Kashmir, Light & Life Publishers, ISBN 9788183390446
- Khoyihami, Peer Ghulam Hassan (January 1960). Tazkirah Auliya-e-Kashmir: Tarikh-e-Hasan; Vol. 3 تذکرۂ اولیائے کشمیر (in Urdu). Srinagar, kashmir: Ghulam Mohammad Noor Muhammad Tajiran Kutub.
- Khoyihami, Peer Ghulam Hassan (1885). Tarikh-i-Hasan (in Persian). Vol. 2. Srinagar, kashmir: Ghulam Mohammad Noor Muhammad Tajiran Kutub.
- Didamari, Muhammed Azam (2019) [First published in Persian in 1747]. Waqiat-i-Kashmir (in Urdu). Translated by Ahmad, Shamsuddin. Srinagar: Jammu and Kashmir Islamic Research Center.
- Sufi, G.M.D. (1944). Kashir: A history of Kashmir (PDF). Vol. 1. Lahore: University of the Punjab.
- Sufi, G.M.D. (1949). Kashir: A history of Kashmir. Vol. 2. Lahore: University of the Punjab.
