= Malkha Cemetery =

Historic and largest cemetery of Kashmir Valley

Malkha
- Interactive map of Malkha

Details
- Established: 15th century
- Location: Nowhatta, Srinagar, Kashmir Valley
- Coordinates: 34.100391°N 74.818566°E
- Type: Public Muslim
- Size: 800 to 1300 kanals

Malkha Cemetery (Note: Kashmiri: ملہٕ کھاہ) (also spelled Malkhah) is a historic Muslim cemetery located at the southern foothills of Hari Parbat (Koh-e-Maran) in Srinagar, Jammu and Kashmir. Considered one of the oldest and largest cemeteries in the Kashmir Valley, it serves as a major burial ground for Srinagar's Muslim population. Several notable scholars, poets, and historical figures are buried there.

Adjacent to the cemetery, on its western side is Ganj Bakhsh Graveyard (also known as Mazar-i-Kalān) around the tomb of Bahauddin Ganj Bakhsh, a 15th-century Sufi saint.

== Location ==
Malkha Cemetery is situated in Hawal, beneath Hari Parbat Fort in Srinagar. It lies in the Rainawari–Nowhatta area, east of Jamia Masjid. The immediate surrounding locality of Malkha developed around the cemetery and has historically been associated with gravedigger families and caretakers.

Malkhah preserves a few rare Bremji trees (Celtis australis), an ancient nettle species traditionally associated with Sufi saints and burial grounds.

== History ==
=== Origin ===
The area at the foothills of Koh-e-Maran surrounding Malkha was historically filled with orchards containing fruit trees and vineyards, known as Bagh-i-Anguri (garden of grapes). Historical accounts also mention gardens of Daulatabad, an orchard attributed to Daulat Raina. According to Tarikh-i-Hasan, Jahangir Raina, a descendant of Daulat Raina, gifted and dedicated this garden to Baba Ismail Kubrawi (d. 1510), an Ascetic and Shaykh al-Islām of Kashmir.

Baba Ismail was associated with a khanqah (Sufi lodge) at the northern foothills of Koh-e-Maran, which included a langar (community kitchen) that provided meals to scholars, travellers and others. He dedicated the adjacent open land as a waqf (charitable endowment) to serve as a Muslim cemetery. And the land was merged with the land previously dedicated by Mir Mohammad Hamadani (son of Mir Sayyid Ali Hamadani).

Additionally the wider area of the land also contained various mosques and educational institutions, including the Dar al-Shifa near a Kubrawi khanqah before the 16th century.

Before the establishment of the cemetery, Muslims in Srinagar reportedly buried their dead at distant locations, including the foothills of Takht-i-Sulaiman. The route to this burial ground was difficult to travel in muddy and rainy conditions, particularly in winter.

Over time, Malkha became a major burial ground for Srinagar's Muslim population. Some sections of the cemetery were reserved by prominent families, these include the Mazar-i-Qazi Musa Shaheed around the tomb of Qazi Musa, and the Mazar-i-Khandani-i-Mirwaiz, associated with the Mirwaiz lineage. The cemetery subsequently expanded during the periods of plague and high mortality to accommodate additional burials by the wider public.

Over time, Malkha became the principal burial ground for large sections of Srinagar's Muslim population.

=== Other accounts of its origin ===
Other narratives associate the establishment or later expansion of the cemetery to land donations by Miram Bazaz, a Turkic trader who settled in Srinagar. Local tradition holds that he acquired the land and dedicated it for Muslims burials following a spiritual vision involving his murshid (spiritual guide), Hamza Makhdoom.

== Mazar-i-Kalān ==
Mazar-i-Kalān, (Note: Kashmiri: مزارِ کلاں) commonly known as the Graveyard of Bahuddin Ganj Bakhsh, is located on the western side of Malkha. Before Baba Ismail endowing the land of Malkha in 1510, the western portion of the area served as a burial site centred around the tomb of Bahauddin Ganj Bakhsh. The tomb was built during the reign of Sultan Zayn al-Abidin (r. 1420–1470). The site was originally intended as the burial place of the sultan's wife, Taj Khatoon. However, following Bahauddin's death in 1445, she endowed the plot as a public waqf. Several other individuals were subsequently buried in the graveyard, including Taj Khatoon herself.

== Contemporary condition and significance ==
Malkha cemetery historically covering around 700 to 1,300 kanals of land, though its area reportedly declined due to encroachments and residential construction. Local residents and historians have alleged that parts of the cemetery were converted into housing colonies despite fencing erected in 2007 to prevent further encroachments.

The cemetery holds religious significance during Shab-e-Barat, when large numbers of people visit to offer Fateh Khawani (prayers for the deceased). On this occasion, the cemetery remains open to the public and becomes a centre of devotional activity.

In recent decades, Malkha has faced criticism over poor maintenance and reports of gambling, drug use, and other anti-social activities within the cemetery grounds. Through the cemetery is a communal, unlike many public cemeteries in the broader Islamic world, plots within Malkha have gradually been split, compartmentalized, and claimed as inherited family property. Families use concrete boundaries to demarcate their specific ancestral plots.

== Notable burials ==
=== Malkha ===
- Qazi Musa (d. 1585), a qazi, executed by Yakub Shah Chak. (Note: For detail about his execution, see: Yakub Shah Chak#Relationship with his Sunni subjects, rebellion)
- Mullah Mazhari (d. 1617), Persian-language poet, appointed as Mir Bahr (admiral of Kashmir) by Akbar.
- Muhammed Azam Didamari (d. 1765), historian.
- Ghulam Rasool Nazki (d. 1998), writer and broadcaster.
- Farooq Nazki (d. 2024), poet and broadcaster.

=== Mazar-i-Kalān ===
- Bahauddin Ganj Bakhsh (d. 1445), Sufi mystic.
- Taj Khatoon (d. 1468), queen consort of Zayn al-Abidin the Great.

== See also ==
- Mazar-i-Salatin
- Mazar-e-Shura

== Sources ==
- Didamari, Muhammed Azam (2019) [First published in Persian in 1747]. Waqiat-i-Kashmir (in Urdu). Translated by Ahmad, Shamsuddin. Srinagar: Jammu and Kashmir Islamic Research Center. ISBN 81-8304-0004.
- Khoyihami, Hassan Shah (January 1960). Tazkirah Auliya-e-Kashmir: Tarikh-e-Hasan; Vol. 3 تذکرۂ اولیائے کشمیر (in Urdu). Srinagar, kashmir: Ghulam Mohammad Noor Muhammad Tajiran Kutub.
- Taing, Muhammad Yusuf (1986). Kashir Encyclopedia کٲشر انسائیکلوپیڈیا (in Kashmiri). Vol. 1. Srinagar: Jammu and Kashmir Academy of Art, Culture and Language. pp. 347–349, 362–363.
- Sufi, G.M.D. (1944). Kashir: A history of Kashmir (PDF). Vol. 1. Lahore: University of the Punjab.
- Sufi, G.M.D. (1949). Kashir: A history of Kashmir. Vol. 2. Lahore: University of the Punjab.
