= Saaj =

- Village
- Location in Jammu and Kashmir, India Saaj (India)
- Coordinates: 33.42°N 74.35°E
- Country: India
- Union Territory: Jammu and Kashmir
- District: Rajouri

Population (2011)
  - Total: 4,112
- Time zone: UTC+5:30 (IST)
- PIN: 185132
- Vehicle registration: JK

Saaj or Saj is a village located in the Thanamandi tehsil in Rajouri district of the Indian union territory of Jammu and Kashmir. Saaj lies off NH 144A approximately equidistant from both Rajouri and Thanamandi.

== Population and Agriculture ==
Lohar (Blacksmith), Kamhars (Potters), and Tarkhan (Carpenters) are among some of the most prominent professions. The major part of the population of Saaj depends on farming for their livelihood. Others are government workers or jobs less focused on manual labor. Some animals like buffalo, goats, and sheep are commonly reared, on which people relied on for their livelihood.

According to 2011 census data, Saaj has 946 households and a population of 4,112 (2,148 males and 1,964 females)

The climate of Saaj is moderate and is suitable for various crops and vegetation. The main crops of Saaj are maize (مکی), wheat (گندم), and paddy (دھان).

Maize is cultivated in the middle and upper portion of the village, while Paddy is cultivated in the lower portion of the village, along with wheat cultivated all over the village. Vegetables are also grown in Saaj on a small scale. Saaj is also full of natural vegetation. It has grasslands, meadows, trees, herbs, bushes, and common land for cattle.

== 2011 Census Detail of Village Saaj ==
Total Number of HouseHold : 946
Population	Persons	Males	Females
Total	4,112	2,148	1,964
In the age group 0–6 years	693	376	317
Scheduled Castes (SC)	0	0	0
Scheduled Tribes (ST)	891	471	420
Literates	2,586	1,548	1,038
Illiterate	1,526	600	926
Total Worker	1,979	988	991
Main Worker	1,962	972	990
Main Worker - Cultivator	1,655	706	949
Main Worker - Agricultural Labourers	0	0	0
Main Worker - Household Industries	2	2	0
Main Worker - Other	305	264	41
Marginal Worker	17	16	1
Marginal Worker - Cultivator	5	5	0
Marginal Worker - Agriculture Labourers	1	1	0
Marginal Worker - Household Industries	1	1	0
Marginal Workers - Other	10	9	1
Marginal Worker (3-6 Months)	17	16	1
Marginal Worker - Cultivator (3-6 Months)	5	5	0
Marginal Worker - Agriculture Labourers (3-6 Months)	1	1	0
Marginal Worker - Household Industries (3-6 Months)	1	1	0
Marginal Worker - Other (3-6 Months)	10	9	1
Marginal Worker (0-3 Months)	0	0	0
Marginal Worker - Cultivator (0-3 Months)	0	0	0
Marginal Worker - Agriculture Labourers (0-3 Months)	0	0	0
Marginal Worker - Household Industries (0-3 Months)	0	0	0
Marginal Worker - Other Workers (0-3 Months)	0	0	0
Non Worker	2,133	1,160	973

== Religion in Saaj ==
The whole population of the village is Muslim, which is based on several castes, including the Bhatti, Khokhar, Gujjar, Thaker, Lohar, Kashmiri and Janjua caste. The caste of "Bhatti" is widely spread throughout the village.

== Local Landmarks ==
- Historical Fort (مغل سراۓ )
- Historical Pond (تالاب )
- Holy Tomb of Baba Jallian Wali Sarkar (زیارت بابا جلیانوالی سرکار)
- Leeran Wali Bawli
