= Ali Shah Miri =

Sultan of Kashmir (r. 1413–1418, 1419–1420)

Ali Shah علی شاہ
- Sultan of Kashmir; Shah

8th Sultan of Kashmir
- Reign: 31 May 1413 – 20 February 1418
- Coronation: 1413
- Predecessor: Sikandar Shah
- Successor: Zayn al-Abidin
- Reign: December 1419 – 7 July 1420
- Predecessor: Zayn al-Abidin
- Successor: Zayn al-Abidin
- Born: Srinagar, Kashmir Sultanate
- Died: 1423; Fort Guli Bagh, Pakhli Sarkar, Kashmir Sultanate
- Burial: Kashmir
- Ali Shah Miri
- Dynasty: Shah Mir dynasty
- Father: Sikandar Shah
- Religion: Sunni Islam

Ali Shah Miri (Kashmiri and Persian: علی شاہ میری) also known as Ali Shah (Persian: علی شاہ) was eighth Sultan of Kashmir from 1413 to 1418 and then again from 1419 to 1420. Ali Shah belonged to the Shah Mir dynasty and was succeeded by his younger brother Zain-ul-Abidin.

== Reign ==
After Sikandar's death, his eldest son Mir succeeded him as the Sultan, having adopted the title of Ali Shah.

Ali Shah became the seventh sultan of the Shah Mir dynasty, and reigned between 1413 and 1420. His reign was peaceful. Under Ali Shah's regime, Suhabhatta became the Prime Minister.

Ali Shah was defeated by Sultan Zain-ul-Abidin at Thanna with the help of Jasrath Khokhar, the ruler of Sialkot. The fate of Ali Shah is uncertain: he may have died in captivity or have been put to death by Khokhar.

== Dethronement ==
Shahi Khan, a son of Sultan Sikander the ruler of Kashmir, was charged with the rule of the kingdom of Kashmir when his elder brother, Ali Shah, left the kingdom on a pilgrimage to Mecca. It was at this time that Ali Shah gave Shahi Khan the title of Zain-ul-Abidin. Although a religious man, Ali Shah was weak-willed and his desire to attain Mecca buckled under descriptions of the arduous journey ahead. He abandoned his pilgrimage when he arrived at the court of his father-in-law, the king of Jammu, and raised an army consisting of soldiers from Jammu and Rajauri in order to regain his throne. The ancient texts vary regarding why it was that Zain-ul-Abidin relinquished his recently acquired status without a fight but there is no disagreement that this is in fact what happened.

== Struggle for throne and death ==
Retiring to Sialkot, Zain-ul-Abidin sought the support of its chief, Jasrat Khokhar. Ali Shah became angered when this support was forthcoming and he rashly set out with his army to challenge Khokhar. The forces met at Thanna and Khokhar defeated the challenger, who had ignored the advice of his father-in-law to hold back until the Jammu army could join him. Zain-ul-Abidin was then able to return to the capital city of Srinagar, where he was welcomed by his subjects. The fate of Ali Shah is uncertain: he may have died in captivity or have been put to death by Khokhar.
