= Mazar-e-Shura =

Mazar-e-Shuara
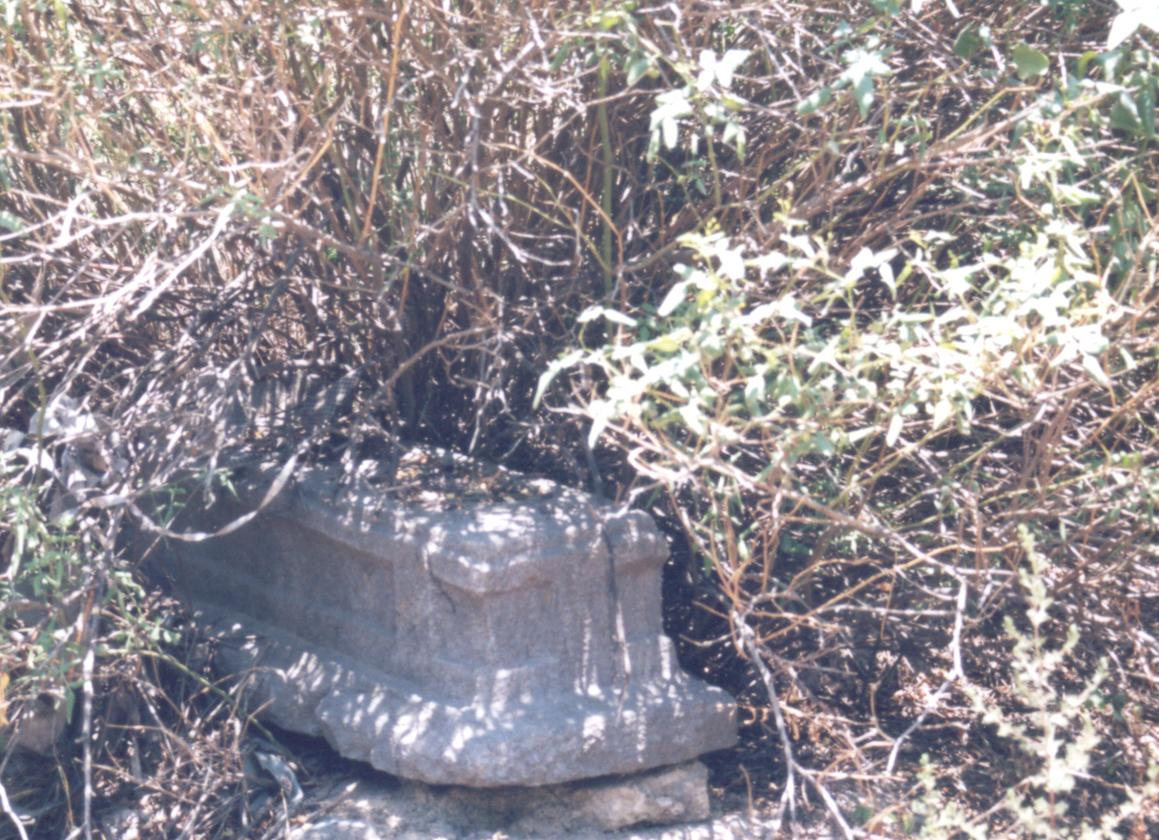
- A Grave in the Mazar-e-Shuara cemetery.

Details
- Established: 1587
- Location: Srinagar, Jammu and Kashmir, India
- Country: India
- Type: Historic
- Style: Mughal
- No. of graves: 5

Mazar-e-Shuara (Persian: مزارِ شُعَراء, romanized: Mazār-i-Shu'arā, lit. 'Cemetery of Poets') is a cemetery on a small hill by the main road in Dalgate, an area of Srinagar, Jammu and Kashmir in India. Founded in the reign of the Mughul emperor Akbar the Great, it was built in a scenic location on the banks of the Dal Lake as a cemetery for eminent poets. Historical records show that there were five poets and men of letters buried in the cemetery, all natives of Iran who emigrated to India and were associated with the Mughal court. Only three tombstones are now visible as the place is neglected, overrun by weeds and littered with rubbish. One of the tombstones bears an inscription that is only partially legible.

== Interments ==
=== Shah Abul Fatah ===
A native of Iran who came to India, Shah Abul Fatah became a courtier of Akbar. He traveled to Kashmir with Akbar in 1587 AD (995 Hijri) where he suddenly fell ill and died. The poet Urfi eulogised him in a poem. He was the first person to be buried in this cemetery.

=== Haji Jan Mohammed Qudsi ===
Haji Jan Mohammed Qudsi (1582-1646) was a native of the Mashhad in Iran. He joined the court of the Mughal emperor Shah Jahan where he rose to become MulkushShura (poet laureate). It is said that Shah Jahan had Qudsi weighed in gold, which was then presented to him as a reward for his poetic excellence. When his son Mohammed Baqir died in the prime of his youth in Mashhad, Qudsi was heartbroken and decided not to go back to his native land but remain in India. Later he settled permanently in Kashmir. He was a great admirer of Ghani Kashmiri and the admiration was mutual. An anecdote recounts that one of Qudsi's couplets was reworded by a school boy as he was reciting it in front of that boy's teacher. Qudsi cheerfully accepted the correction and appreciated the boy's wit.

=== Abu Talib Kaleem ===
A native of the Persian city of Hamedan, when Abu Talib Kaleem heard about Qudsi's reception at the court of Shah Jahan, he too went to India and became a courtier of the Emperor. Kaleem soon attained fame as a poet. The great Urdu poets Sauda and Mir Taqi Mir have written Tazmeens (poems formed by inserting verses from another's poem) of his ghazals. Kaleem was assigned the task of writing a history of the Mughals in poetic form and sent to Kashmir so that he could do his work undisturbed. Like Qudsi, he was a great admirer and friend of Ghani Kashmiri who wrote an elegy on his death (in 1650 A.D) in which he also remembered Qudsi and Saleem as great and noble poets, saying that it was the love of those two that prevailed upon Kaleem so, that he left this world and joined them in the cemetery.

=== Mohammed Quli Saleem ===
Another native of Iran, Mohammed Quli Saleem also went India in the reign of Shah Jahan. He joined the court of the prime minister Nawab Islam Khan. Saleem was accused by the Iranian poet Sa'ib of plagiarising his poetry. He went to Kashmir with some Omrahs where he fell ill and died and was buried in the Mazar-e-Shuara.

=== Tughra Mashhadi ===
As his name indicates, Tughra Mashhadi was a native of Mashhad in Iran. He was an accomplished poet, but had a bad habit of satirizing his contemporaries including Qudsi and Ghani. He was the only person against whom Ghani wrote harsh words. The reason for Ghani's displeasure was the use of abusive language by Tughra when satirising him. Tughra went to Kashmir with Mirza Abul Qasim (who is also buried in the cemetery). In later life he apparently became demented and lived like a madman in a shop in Nayidyaar in the Rainawari district of Srinagar.

== See also ==
- Malkha Cemetery
- Mazar-i-Salatin
