= Farooq Nazki =

Indian poet and broadcaster (1940–2024)

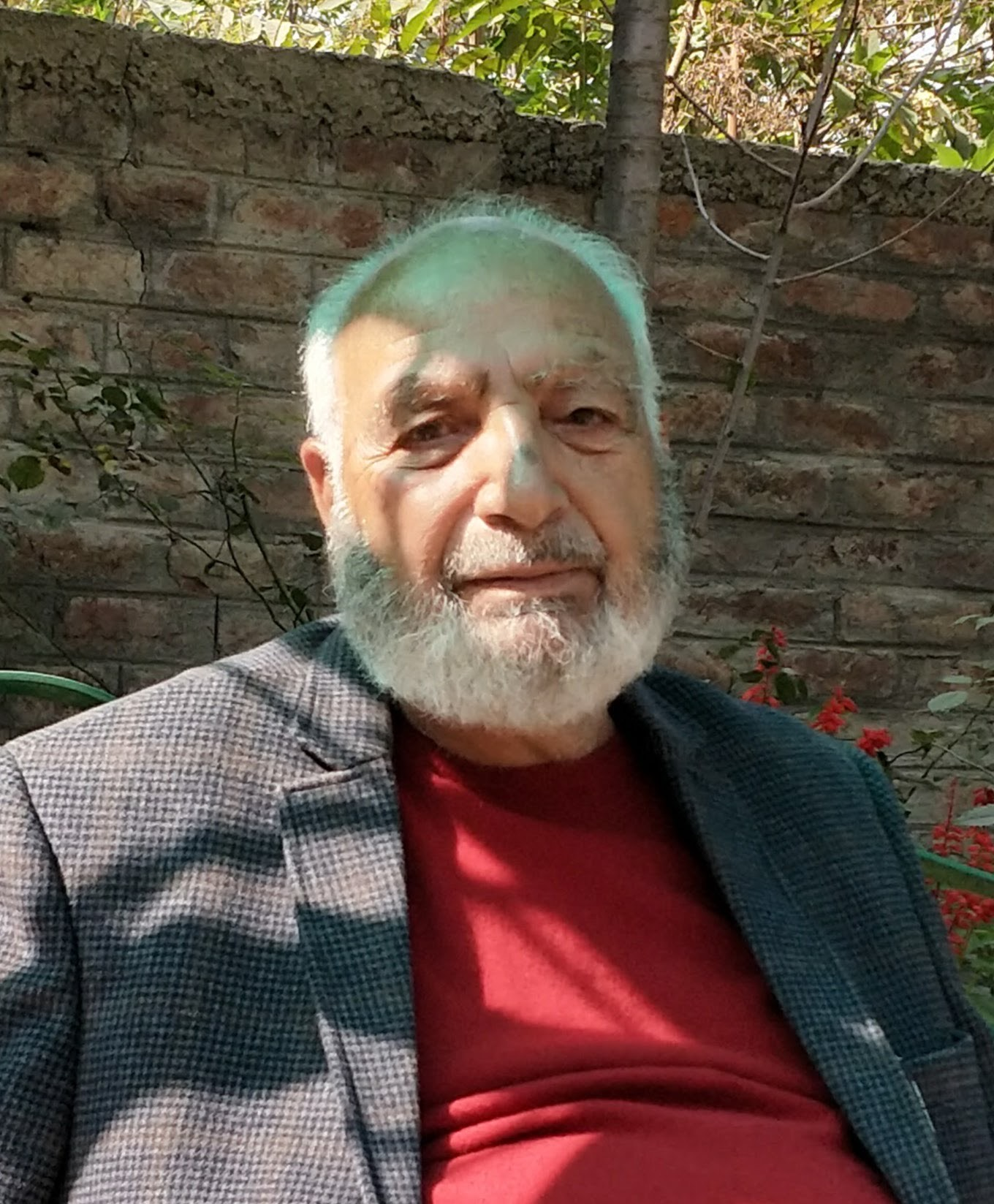
- Nazki in 2020
- Born: 14 February 1940; Srinagar, Jammu & Kashmir, India
- Died: 6 February 2024 (aged 83); Katra, Jammu & Kashmir, India
- Burial place: Malkha Cemetery, Srinagar
- Occupations: Public intellectual, poet, author, broadcaster
- Children: Roohi Nazki
- Father: Ghulam Rasool Nazki

Farooq Nazki (14 February 1940 – 6 February 2024) was an Indian poet, broadcaster and media personality from the Union Territory of Jammu and Kashmir. He also served as Director Doordarshan and erstwhile Radio Kashmir Srinagar (AIR Srinagar) from 1986 to 1997 under Ministry of Information and Broadcasting (India). Besides being a media head and having a writing career, Nazki also served as Editor "Daily Mazdoor" from 1960. This newspaper for the first time made conscious efforts to highlight the importance of labour in the valley. In 2000 he retired as its Deputy Director General. He was media advisor to two Chief Ministers: Farooq Abdullah (in 1983 and 1990–2002) and Omar Abdullah (2010).

Nazki had multiple health issues prior to his death. He was on dialysis for some time, as his lungs were suffering from a serious disease. After suffering a heart attack, Nazki died at a hospital in Katra, on 6 February 2024, eight days before turning 84. He was buried at Malkha Cemetery in Srinagar.

== Honours and awards ==
In 1995 he won the Sahitya Academy award in Kashmiri language literature for his book of poetry, Naar Hyutun Kanzal Wanas ( Fire in the eyelashes). He also won the state cultural Academy Award for both that work and Lafz Lafz Noha. He also won Jammu & Kashmir Academy of culture, Art & Languages Best book Award for his Kashmiri book. For Media contributions he won Gold Medal J&K Government for Best management of electronic media. Further he won Award for best media controller in Asiad 1982.

== Publications ==
=== Urdu Books ===
1. Lafz Lafz Navha
2. Akhri Khwab Se Pehlay

=== Kashmiri Books ===
1. Nar Hutron Kazal
2. Wannas, Mahjabeen

== See also ==
- List of Sahitya Akademi Award winners for Kashmiri
