= Zayn al-Abidin the Great =

Sultan of Kashmir (r. 1418–1419, 1420–1470)

Zayn al-Abidin زين العابدين
- Budshah: Padishah; Na'ib Amir al-Mu'minin; Sultan al-Az'am
- Depiction of a "King of Kashmir" in the Anwar-e-Sohaili of Husayn Kashifi, c. 1500, Herat

Sultan of Kashmir
- Reign: 7 July 1420 – 12 May 1470
- Coronation: 7 July 1420
- Predecessor: Ali Shah
- Successor: Haider Shah
- Reign: 20 February 1418 – December 1419
- Coronation: 20 February 1418
- Predecessor: Ali Shah
- Successor: Ali Shah

Wazir of Kashmir
- In office 30 December 1416 – 20 February 1418
- Monarch: Ali Shah
- Preceded by: Hamsa Bhat
- Succeeded by: Office suspended
- Born: Shah Rukh c. 1401 CE; Srinagar, Kashmir Sultanate (present-day Jammu and Kashmir, India)
- Died: 12 May 1470 (aged 68–69); Naushahr, Srinagar, Kashmir Sultanate
- Burial: Mazar-i-Salatin, Zaina Kadal, Srinagar
- Consort: Taj Khatoon (m. 1421; died 1468) A sister of Manik Dev, Raja of Jammu; Sunder Devi, daughter of Sunder Sena, Raja of Rajauri
- Issue: Adham Khan; Haji Khan; Hasan Khan; Bahram Khan; Jasrat Khan two daughters
Names
- Shahi Khan شاهی خان; Zayn al-Abidin زین العابدین
Regnal name
- Al-Sultān al-Āzam Nāib Amīr al-Mu'minīn Qutb al-Dunyā wa'l-Dīn Abu'l Mujāhid al-Ādil Zayn al-Abidīn al-Sultān (Note: السلطان الاعظم نائب امیر المومنین قطب الدنیا والدین ابو المجاہد العادل زین العابدین السلطان (lit. 'The Great Sultan, Deputy Commander of the Faithful, Pillar of the World and the Faith, Father of the Victorious, the Just, Zayn al-Abidin, the Sultan'))
Posthumous name
- Budshah (lit. 'The Great King')
- House: Shah Mir
- Dynasty: Gibari (Note: Modern scholarship differ on the origin of the Shah Mirs. However, most modern historians generally accept that Shah Mir, the founder of the dynasty, was from Swat in Dardistan. Some accounts including those of Tahir, Haidar Malik, Rafiu'd Din Ahmad and Muhammad A'azam trace his descent from the Gibarid rulers of Swāt.)
- Father: Sikandar Shah
- Mother: Mira Khatun
- Religion: Sunni Islam (Note: School of Jurisprudence: Hanafi)

Qutb al-Din Zayn al-Abidin (Persian: قطب الدین زین العابدین; c. 1401 – 12 May 1470), more famously known as Zayn al-Abidin the Great (Persian: زین العابدینِ اعظم, romanized: Zayn al-ʿĀbidīn-e-Āzam), was the ninth sultan of the Kashmir Sultanate. He was given the mandate to rule in 1418 in the absence of his brother, Ali Shah before defeating him in the ensuing civil war in 1420 with the help of Jasrat Khokhar. After his illness and subsequent death, his son Haider Shah succeeded him in 1470. He is remembered as Buḍshāh (lit. 'The Great King') by Kashmiri people.

The first 35 years of his reign are described by Jonaraja in the Rajatarangini Dvitiya, while the subsequent years are described by his pupil, Śrivara, in the Rajatarangini Tritiya. His fifty-year reign is widely revered as a Golden age of peace, religious tolerance, and economic prosperity in medieval Kashmir. Trade networks expanded through diplomatic missions to foreign courts, contributing to the growth of major commercial centres such as Srinagar and Anantnag. His rule also witnessed a vibrant cultural renaissance, with developments in education, literature, architecture and the arts. Additionally, Kashmiri architecture during his reign incorporated Indo-Islamic influences. The Sultan also composed poetry in Persian under the pen name of Qutb. He was succeeded by his son Haji Khan, who later assumed the regnal title Haider Shah.

== Early life ==
Tanka coin of Sikandar Shah, c. 1394

=== Birth and background ===
Zayn al-Abidin was born as Shah Rukh in c. 1401 at Srinagar. He was the second son of Sultan Sikandar Shah and Mira Khatun, the daughter of Firuz, the chief of Ohind. Sikander Shah had married Mira Khatun following his military victory over Firuz early in his reign. He was given the name Shahi Khan as a prince.

During his youth, Zayn al-Abidin was known as Shahi Khan and was tutored by Maulana Kabir, who is described as a Kashmiri scholar and polymath. Some accounts suggest Kabir held liberal views and may have influenced Shahi Khan’s humanistic outlook.

=== Years in Samarkand ===
Shahi Khan was sent to Samarkand by his father as part of a diplomatic mission to Timur’s court. He spent seven to eight years in Samarkand, during which he is reported to have observed the city's administrative practices, crafts, and architecture.

Following Timur's death in 1405, Shahi Khan prepared to return to Kashmir. Later accounts state that he returned accompanied by artisans and craftsmen, including paper-makers, bookbinders, carpet weavers, saddle makers, and other skilled workers, who contributed to the development of local industries during his reign.

== Accession ==
=== Appointment as wazir and regency ===
Upon his return, Shahi Khan assisted his father and later his elder brother, Sultan Ali Shah, in state affairs. On 30 December 1416 (on Eid al-Adha), Shahi Khan assassinated the rebellious vizier Hamsabhatta at the Eidgah. Following this event, Ali Shah is reported to have appointed Shahi Khan as his new wazir.

Shahi Khan was later entrusted with the administration of the sultanate, during, Ali Shah's departure on a pilgrimage to Mecca. During this period, Ali Shah granted Shahi Khan the title of Zayn al-Abidin (Ornament of Worshippers).

Ali Shah later abandoned his pilgrimage after reaching the court of his father-in-law, Raja Bhim Dev of Jammu, and raised an army consisting of soldiers from Jammu and Rajauri in an attempt to reclaim the throne. According to historical accounts, Zayn al-Abidin relinquished his recently acquired authority without resistance, though the reasons for this remain disputed.

=== Civil war ===
Zayn al-Abidin retreated to Sialkot, where he formed an alliance with its ruler, Jasrat Khokar. Hearing the news Ali Shah marched against Jasrat's forces. The two armies met at Thanna, where Jasrat defeated Ali Shah's forces. According to Śrivara, Ali Shah was killed by Jasrat. However, later Persian chronicles claim him to have escaped the battlefield.

Zayn al-Abidin was then able to return to the capital city of Srinagar, where he was welcomed by his subjects. However, Ali Shah launched a counter-offensive with the aid of the Raja of Jammu. Zayn al-Abidin marched against him through the Baramulla pass and confronted him at Uri, where Ali Shah suffered another defeated. Accounts of Ali Shah's final fate differ; some state that he may have died in captivity, while others suggest that he was executed by Khokhar. Zayn al-Abidin was subsequently crowned Sultan for his second and primary reign in 1420 (or 1422 according to Abul Fazl).

== Military campaigns ==
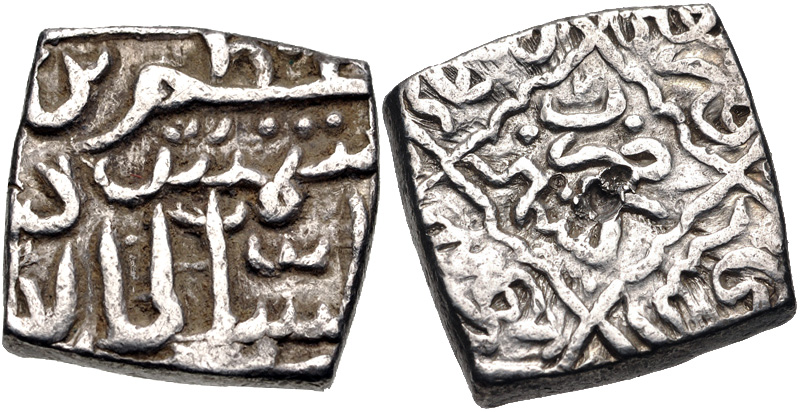
Sasnu coin issued by Zayn al-Abidin, c. 1428

To maintain the territorial integrity of the Kashmir Sultanate, Zayn al-Abidin undertook campaigns to recover frontier territories that had broken away during the reign of Ali Shah. He successfully annexed Ladakh and Baltistan regions which had originally conquered by his grandfather Shihabu'd-Din Shah but later asserted independence until Sikander Shah restored control. However, during the reign of Ali Shah, these territories once again began to assert their independence. He also regained control over Ohind, whose chief had previously been subdued by Sikander Shah but declared independence during the rule of Ali Shah.

During his reign, Kashmir also faced an external threat from Kashgar. According to contemporary chronicles, the king of Kashgar dispatched an invading force toward the Kashmir Valley. In response, Zayn al-Abidin assembled a large army, reportedly consisting of 20,000 cavalry and 100,000 infantry. The Kashmiri forces engaged the invaders in a battle lasting several days and ultimately repelled the Kashgar army.

== Administration ==
Zayn al-Abidin introduced series of administrative and economic reforms aimed at strengthening state authority and stabilizing the economy. To improve law and order, he instituted a system of collective responsibility under which village communities were held accountable for crimes committed within their jurisdictions.

He also implemented measures to regulate commodity prices and stabilize the currency, which had been debased under earlier rulers. In addition, he prohibited provincial governors from imposing arbitrary or unauthorized taxes on the peasantry, thereby providing tax relief to rural communities.

His reign was further marked by extensive public works projects, including the construction of irrigation canals, bridges, urban settlements, and other civic infrastructure intended to improve agriculture productivity and facilitate trade.

=== Religious policies ===
Zayn al-Abidin is noted for his policy of religious tolerance and public welfare. In contrast to the policies associated with the reign of his father, Sultan Sikandar, he adopted a more accommodative approach toward the diverse religious communities of Kashmir.

He abolished the jizya imposed on non-Muslims in Kashmir. He also encouraged the return of Hindus who had left Kashmir during earlier persecutions, restoring stipends and state patronage to learned Brahmins. Under his reign, Hindus were allowed to rebuild temples and practice personal law according to the Dharma shastras. He also introduced regulations concerning the slaughter and consumption of cattle, including a prohibition on killing cows by poisoning.

During the Planning and development of the new capital at Naushahr, several abandoned and dilapidated places of worship located within the area were repaired and restored instead of being demolished.

According to Hargopal Kaul, the Sultan was referred to not only as Bud Shah (Great King) but also as But Shah in reference to his patronage of Kashmiri Pandits.

== Foreign relations ==
Zayn al-Abidin maintained diplomatic and cultural relations with several contemporary states and dynasties across Asia and the Islamic world, including the Mamluk Sultanate of Egypt, the Timurid Empire in Khorasan, the Sharifate of Mecca, and the sultanates of Bengal, Sindh, and Gujarat. Diplomatic contacts were also maintained with the Tomaras of Gwalior, the Phagmodrupa dynasty of Tibet and the Kar-Kiya dynasty of Gilan.

Historical records report that embassies were exchanged and gifts presented between courts. Contemporary accounts note that Zayn al-Abidin valued scholarly and literary gifts more highly than precious objects

== Patronage of education and arts ==
=== Dar-ul-Ulum at Naushahr ===
Zayn al-Abidin established an educational institution near his royal palace in his capital city of Naushahr (present day Nowshera in Srinagar), referred to in contemporary sources as Dar-ul-Ulum (residential university) of Naushahr or the Madrassah-i-Sultani. The institution developed under the rectorship of the scholar Maulana Kabir, who had served as the Sultan's tutor and was also appointed as Shaykh al-Islām.

Contemporary accounts describe the institution as attracting scholars from different parts of Central and South Asia including Mulla Hafiz Baghdadi and Mulla Parsa. Its expenses were funded by revenues of several assigned villages. The institution reportedly survived until the 17th century.

=== Translation bureau and literary activity ===
Zayn al-Abidin extended patronage to Persian, Sanskrit, and Kashmiri. He is described as being proficient in Persian, Sanskrit, and Tibetan. He established a state-sponsored translation bureau (Dar-ul-Tarjuma) under the supervision of the educational establishment at Naushahr.

At this bureau, a number of works Arabic and Sanskrit works were translated into Persian and Kashmiri. By his royal order, the Mahabharata and Kalhana's Rajatarangini were translated from Sanskrit into Persian. The first known Persian translation of a portion of the Rajatarangini was commissioned by Zayn al-Abidin and was titled Bahr-ul-Asmar (Sea of Tales). A Persian-language history of Kashmir was also compiled during this period. Srivara also began translating Jami's Yusuf and Zulaikha into Sanskrit, the work was completed in 1505 under the title Katha-Kautuka.

=== Court scholars and interreligious patronage ===
Zayn al-Abidin’s court included both Muslim and Hindu scholars, reflecting the broader literary and intellectual activity of his reign. Among the prominent scholars associated with his court was Soma, who occupied an important position in the translation bureau, supervised educational affairs, and composed the Zaina Charita, a biographical work on the Zayn al-Abidin.

Another scholar associated with the court, Bodhi Bhutt, who was reputed in later accounts to have memorised Ferdowsi’s Shahnameh, which he is said to have recited before the Sultan. The Sanskrit scholar and historian Jonaraja continued Kalhana's historical tradition by extending the narrative of Rajatarangini into the Sultanate period.

Among the Muslim scholars patronised during the reign were Mulla Ahmad Kashmiri and Mullah Nadiri, both of whom were associated with literary and historical writing in Persian. Mulla Ahmad, a poet and historian, is associated with a Persian translation of the Mahabharata and historical works on Kashmir, Tarikh-i-Waqay Kashmir, While Mullah Nadiri is credited with authoring the now-lost chronicle Tarikh-i-Kashmir. Other scholars associated with the court included Qazi Jamal-ud-Din, who later served as chief justice, Qazi Mir Ali Bokhari, and the theologian Syed Hussain Qummi Razavi, who settled in Kashmir during Sultan's reign.

=== Music ===
Unlike his father Sikandar, who had prohibited music, Zain al-Abidin became an important patron of musical culture in Kashmir. Contemporary accounts state that he frequently spent evenings in the company of singers and dancers and rewarded musicians generously. During his reign, Kashmir gained prominence for its musical traditions.

Among the notable musicians associated with his court was Yodhabhatta, who is said to have composed a treatise on music dedicated to the Sultan. Other prominent musicians included Mulla 'Udi from Khurasan and Mulla Zada, also from Khurasan, who was known for his skill in playing the tortoise-shell lute. The chronicler Śrivara is likewise described as a skilled lute player who sang Persian songs, while Jamil was noted as a poet, painter, and musician with a reputation for singing Persian compositions.

== Architecture and urban development ==
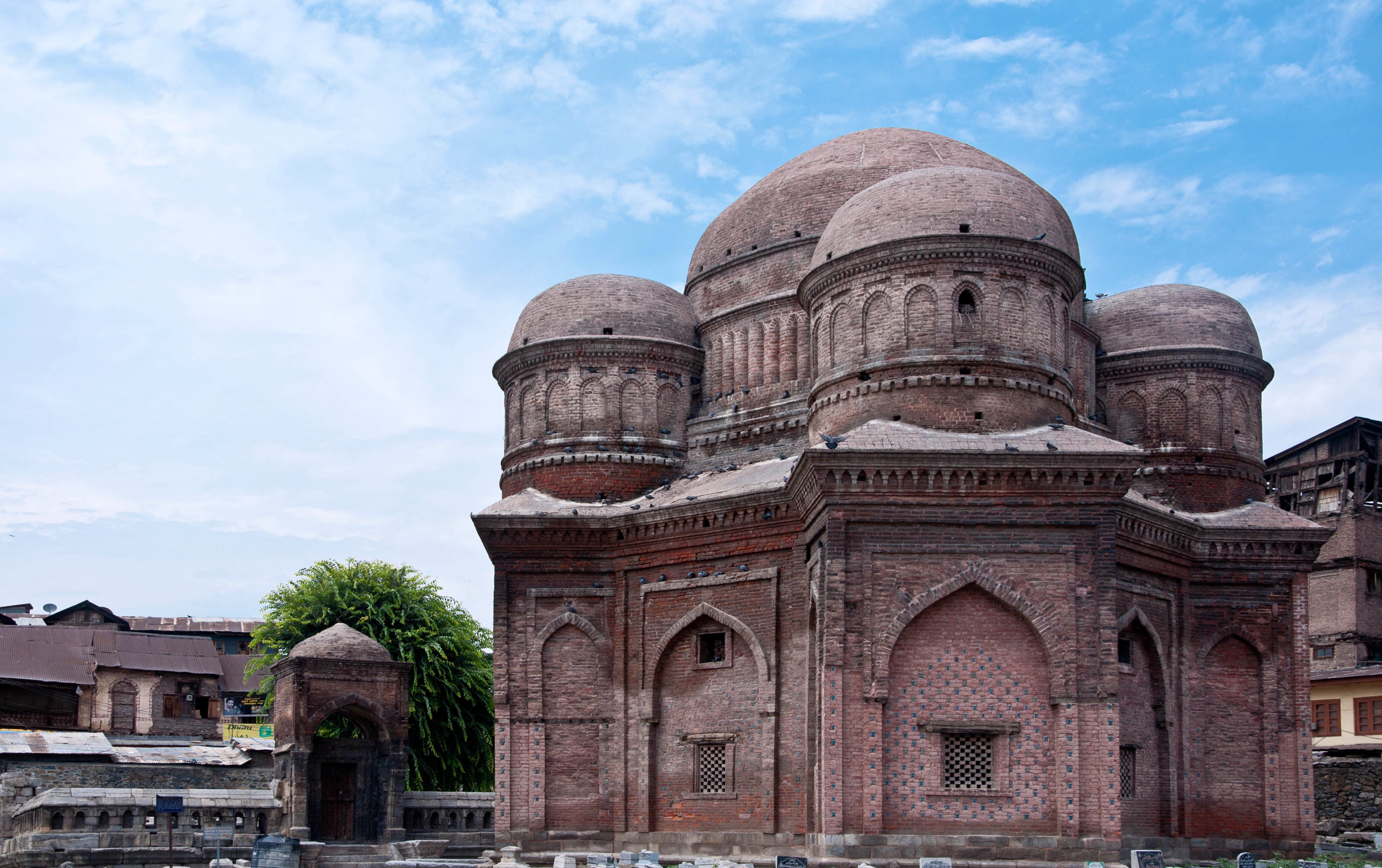
The tomb of the mother of Zayn al-Abidin, better known as the Budshah tomb

Zayn al-Abidin undertook numerous construction and urban development projects during his reign, although the vast majority of these wooden structures commissioned under his patronage were later destroyed by fire and or lost over time. Only a small number of brick and stone structures survive today.

=== Urban development ===
He founded the new town of Naushahr (present-day Nowshera in Srinagar), which served as his capital. Some sources describe Naushahr as the central part of a larger urban settlement known as Zainanagar, founded in 1439 CE. The chronicler Jonaraja also refers to this city, indicating that it extended from the outskirts of Hari Parbat to Amberhor, encompassing areas corresponding to present-day Lal Bazar, Hawal, Nowshera, Awanta Bhawan, and Soura.

The principal palace at Naushahr, constructed in 1464 CE is described as a large multi-storeyed wooden structure containing numerous halls and chambers and was known as the Zaina Dab. In his historical accounts, Mirza Haidar Dughlat described the palace as consisting of twelve storeys, each containing fifty rooms, featuring a gilded dome, and halls decorated with glass panels. According to Walter Lawrence, each room had the capacity to accommodate 500 men, and the water was supplied to the building from the Sind River. A major educational institution was also established near the royal Palace.

Zayn al-Abidin additionally founded the towns of Zaynapur, Zaynagir, and Zaynakot. Zaynagir contained a palace surrounded by gardens, which are reported to have probably been destroyed during the later Shah Mir period, while Zaynakot survives as a village 4 km west of Srinagar.

The construction of Jamia Masjid in Srinagar was also completed in his reign, which had been initiated during the reign of Sultan Sikandar. In addition, he commissioned several infrastructure projects, including the construction of the Zaina kadal bridge, as well as causeways, connecting the Dal Lake region with the Phag pargana (Zabarwan Range) and from Andarkot to Sopore.

=== Zaynalank and hydraulic works ===
In 1443–1444, Zayn al-Abidin ordered the reclamation of an island in the north-eastern part of Wular Lake, that had reportedly become submerged. On the reclaimed island, known as Zaynalank, he commissioned the construction of a palace, mosque, gardens, and a stone embankment.

The Sultan also commissioned hydraulic and flood-control works, including a stone-reinforced embankment between Sopore and Safapur intended to prevent flooding and reclaim marshland for cultivation.

The only buildings commissioned by Zayn al-Abidin that still exist are the tomb of his mother, and the mosque and tomb of Madani.

== Industry and economic development ==
During the reign of Zayn al-Abidin, Kashmir witnessed significant development in crafts and industry under state patronage. Historical accounts attribute many of these developments to the influence of the administrative and cultural models of Central Asia, particularly those associated with Samarkand, where Zayn al-Abidin spent eight years of his youth. He encouraged settlements of artisans, craftsmen and scholars from Iran, Turan, Turkistan, and Hindustan into Kashmir. Additionally he sent his subjects to foreign regions to learn about certain industries

=== Papier-Mâché and paper manufacturing ===
Papier-Mâché (Kar-i-Qalamdan) developed into an organised craft tradition during his reign, with major production centres established at Naushahr in Srinagar. Originally associated with the manufacture of decorated pen cases (qalamdan), the craft was practiced in royal workshops (karkhanas) where artisans specialised in moulding paper pulp and painting ornamental designs.

Paper manufacturing (Koshur Kaqaziri) also expanded under royal patronage through the introduction of rag-based paper-making techniques associated with Samarkand, gradually replacing the earlier use of birch bark as writing material in Kashmir.

=== Textile ===
Textile sector expanded during his reign through the adoption of Persian and Central Asian weaving techniques. Carpet Weaving (Kaleen) developed through introduction of Persian weaving methods and knotting techniques. Workshops trained local artisans in the production of hand-knotted carpets, while the taleem system was used to communicate weaving patterns and colour sequences through coded instructions.

=== Decorative crafts ===
Decorative woodcraft traditions such as Khatamband ceilings and Pinjrakari lattice work were introduced during this period. Stone polishing, stone cutting, metal works and bottle making were among the techniques promoted during his reign.

== Later life and death ==
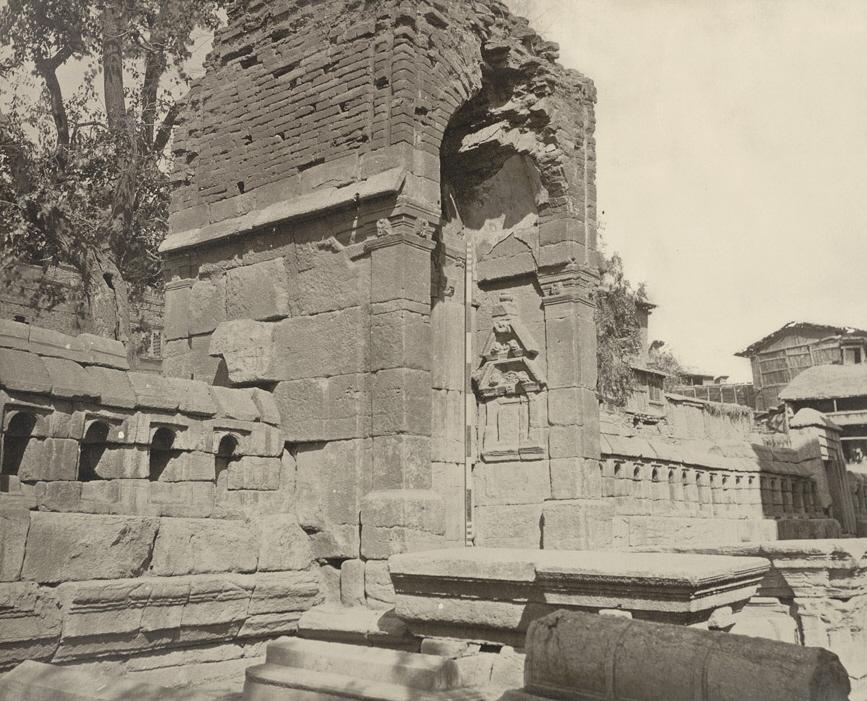
Tomb of Zayn al-Abidin in 1866

=== Succession disputes ===
In the later period of his reign, Zayn al-Abidin faced internal family conflict following the death of his consort, Taj Khatoon. His sons, Adam Khan, Haji Khan and Bahram Khan, became engaged in disputes over succession and rebelled against him. Although he was able to suppress the rebellion.

In his final years, Zayn al-Abidin's health deteriorated. he is described as having suffered from cognitive decline accompanied by symptoms interpreted as Paranoia, while some modern interpretations have characterized his conditions as schizophrenia. In fear of poisoning, he reportedly avoided food prepared at court and gradually withdrew from active involvement in administrative affairs.

=== Death ===
Zayn al-Abidin died at noon on Friday, 12 May 1470 (Note: Srivara records the date as Friday, the twelfth lunar day of the month of Jyeshtha, in the forty-sixth year of the local calendar.) (Julian Calendar). Contemporary and later chroniclers state that he reigned for fifty-two years. He died at the age of sixty-nine. He was buried at Mazar-i-Salatin, the royal cemetery of the Shah Mir dynasty in Srinagar, near the grave of his father.

Following his death, Kashmir reportedly observed several days of mourning for the Sultan, during which people are said to have fasted on the day of mourning. According to Srivara, ministers, servants, and citizens participated in funeral rites and lamentations, while the Sultan's body was carried in a litter accompanied by royal insignia such as the umbrella and chamara (ceremonial whisk). He was succeeded by Haji Khan, who assumed the regnal name Haidar Shah.

== Legacy ==
Zayn al-Abidin is regarded by both medieval chroniclers and modern historians as one of the most prominent rulers of Kashmir. Historian Mohibbul Hasan describes him as undoubtedly the greatest of the sultans of Kashmir, and credited his reign with bringing half a century of peace, prosperity and benevolent rule to Kashmir.

Of all the Sulṭāns who sat on the throne of Kashmīr, Zainu'l-Ābidīn was undoubtedly the greatest.

— Mohibbul Hasan, Kashmir Under the Sultans

== Bibliography ==
- Hasan, Mohibbul (2005) [first published 1959], Kashmir Under the Sultans (Reprinted ed.), Delhi: Aakar Books, ISBN 978-81-87879-49-7
- Majumdar, A. K. (1967), "Chapter XIII, Part C: Kāshmir", in Majumdar, R. C.; Pusalker, A. D.; Majumdar, A. K. (eds.), The Delhi Sultanate (second ed.), Bharatiya Vidya Bhavan
- Sufi, G.M.D. (1979), Islamic Culture in Kashmir, Light & Life Publishers, ISBN 9788183390446
- Bamzai, Prithvi Nath Koul (8 October 1962). A History of Kashmir (PDF). Delhi: Metropolitan Book Co.(Private) Ltd. p. 304.
- Saraf, D.N. (1987), Arts and Crafts, Jammu and Kashmir, Abhinav Publications, ISBN 9788170172048
- Khoyihami, Hassan Shah (January 1960). Tazkirah Auliya-e-Kashmir: Tarikh-e-Hasan; Vol. 3 تذکرۂ اولیائے کشمیر (in Urdu). Srinagar, kashmir: Ghulam Mohammad Noor Muhammad Tajiran Kutub.
- Didamari, Muhammed Azam (2019) [First published in Persian in 1747]. Waqiat-i-Kashmir (in Urdu). Translated by Ahmad, Shamsuddin. Srinagar: Jammu and Kashmir Islamic Research Center.
- Allami, Abul Fazl (1949) [1589–1596]. Ain-i-Akbari آئینِ اکبری ['Ain-i-Akbari of Abul Fazl-i-'Allami]. Vol. 2. Translated by Jarret, H. S. Corrected and further annotated by Jadu-nath Sarkar (2nd ed.). Calcutta: Royal Asiatic Society of Bengal.
- Kalhana (1935). Rajatarangini. Translated by Pandit, Ranjit Sitaram. New Delhi: Sahitya Akademi. "Statement from the translator's note."
- Srivara (October 1994). Zaina Rajatarangini [Srivara's Zaina Rajatarangini]. Translated by Dhar, Kashi Nath. Indian Council of Historical Research and People's Publishing House. ISBN 81-7007-189-5.
- Jonaraja; Srivara; Bhatta, Prajna; Shuka (1990) [1898]. Kings of Kashmira. Vol. 3. Translated by Dutt, Jogesh Chunder. Mittal Publications.
- Lawrence, Walter R. (1895). The Valley of Kashmir. Oxford University Press Warehouse.
