= Jonaraja =

15th-century Kashmiri historian and Sanskrit poet

Jonaraja (died AD 1459) was a Kashmiri historian and Sanskrit poet. His Dvitīyā Rājataraṅginī is a continuation of Kalhana's Rājataraṅginī and brings the chronicle of the kings of Kashmir down to the time of the author's patron Zain-ul-Abidin (r. 1418–1419 and 1420–1470). Jonaraja, however, could not complete the history of the patron as he died in the 35th regnal year. His pupil, Śrīvara continued the history and his work, the Tritīyā Rājataraṅginī, covers the period 1459–1486.

In his Dvitīyā Rājataraṅginī, Jonaraja has vividly described the decline of the Hindu ruling dynasty and the rise of the Muslim ruling dynasty in Kashmir.

== Bibliography ==
- Kingship in Kaśmīr (AD 1148‒1459); From the Pen of Jonarāja, Court Paṇḍit to Sulṭān Zayn al-‛Ābidīn. Critically Edited by Walter Slaje. With an Annotated Translation, Indexes and Maps. [Studia Indologica Universitatis Halensis. 7.] Halle 2014. ISBN 978-3-86977-088-8
