= Sikandar Shah Miri =

Sultan of Kashmir from 1389 to 1413

Sikandar Shah
- Sultan of Kashmir; Sikandar the Idol Breaker; Shah
- Tanka coin of Sikandar Shah, c. 1394

7th Sultan of Kashmir
- Reign: 24 August 1389 – 31 May 1413
- Coronation: 1389
- Predecessor: Qutbu'd-Din Shah
- Successor: Ali Shah
- Born: Shingara; 1380; Srinagar, Kashmir Sultanate (present-day Jammu & Kashmir, India)
- Died: 31 May 1413 (aged 32–33); Srinagar, Kashmir Sultanate (present-day Jammu and Kashmir, India)
- Burial: Mazar-i-Salatin, Zaina Kadal, Srinagar
- Spouse: Mira, daughter of king of Ohind; Shobha Devi; A daughter of Pala Dev, Raja of Jammu
- Issue: Ali Shah; Shahi Khan; Bahram Khan; Muhammad; Firuz two daughters
Names
- Sikandar Shah Miri
- Dynasty: Shah Mir dynasty
- Father: Qutbu'd-Din Shah
- Mother: Sura Rani
- Religion: Sunni Islam (Hanafi)

Sikandar Shah Miri (Kashmiri: سُلطان سِکَندَر شاہ میٖری, Persian: سلطان سکندر شاہ مِیرِی; 1380 – 31 May 1413), also known by his sobriquet Sikandar But-shikan (lit. Sikandar the Iconoclast) or Idol Breaker, was the seventh Sultan of Kashmir and a member of Shah Mir dynasty who ruled from 1389 until his death in 1413.

== Sources ==
The only contemporaneous source that exists is the Rajatarangini (lit. Flow of Succession of Kings) by Jonaraja. Jonaraja was the Brahmin court-poet of Sikandar's successor Zain-ul-Abidin and was commissioned to continue Kalhana's Rajatarangini. One manuscript of his work—edited between 1561 and 1588 by an anonymous person using information from other sources—emends certain portions of the text in the margins; he is conventionally called Pseud. J. (and the work, Ps-JRT) in scholarship.

Extant Persian sources, including Baharistan-i-shahi (anon.), Tohfatu'l-Ahbab (anon.) and Tarikh-i-Kashmir corpus, were written relatively later and drew from recensions of Rajatarangini(s) but they provide considerable additional information. These were later used by authors starting from Abul Fazl, the first chronicler from outside Kashmir and Nizamuddin Ahmad to independent Persian chroniclers to colonial historians and Kashmiri Pandits, with different ideological proclivities, to produce varying strands of histories suiting different sociopolitical goals.

== Background ==
The Shah Miri dynasty likely descended from either Khasa chieftains of Panjgabbar valley or Kohistani Dards from Swat; Shah Mir himself was the first to settle in Kashmir. (Note: Jonaraja notes Shah Mir to be the grandson of one Kuru Shah. He had (apparently) received a divine premonition from Mahadevi about Kashmir being the rightful territory of his lineage.) He began to serve in the royal court of the fledgling Deva Dynasty and before long, became the prime-minister of Suhadeva. Soon, he leveraged a power-vacuum in the wake of a crippling Mongol raid to help Rinchan, a Buddhist from Ladakh, usurp the throne and after his death, waged a successful war against widow Kota Rani to claim the kingdom for himself.

The Shah Miris actively patronaged Islam (esp. Sufism) and led to the formation of a new social order that chipped away at Brahminic Hinduism. A contemporary Shaivite mystic Lal Ded borrowed from Sufism and local cults to attack core tenets of Brahminism and likely serviced conversion to Islam among the lower strata of society. (Note: Ded was critical of untouchability, idol-worship etc. She will in turn influence equally influential Sufi Rishis like Nund et al., who were more proactive to the cause of Islam. All of these figures continue to remain influential among both Hindus and Muslims of modern Kashmir.) By Sikandar's time, a considerable section of the populace had already adopted Islam. Nonetheless, the Kings continued to actively patronage Hinduism: Alaud'din had commissioned a Hindu Matha and Qutubu'd-Din had held royal yajnas.

=== Birth and ascension ===
Sikandar was the great-grandson of Shah Mir; he was the eldest child of Qutubu'd-Din and Queen Sura (var. Subhata), and was born sometime around 1380. Because he was a minor at the time of his father's death—9 August 1389—, his mother had to act as a regent for a while. During her regency, Sura consented to Prime Minister Rai Magre (var. Uddaka), who was also her cousin, burning his own daughter and son-in-law Muhammad, son of a fellow minister Sahaka, on charges of conspiring against Sikandar. Magre went on to poison Haybat, Sikandar's younger brother and even Sahaka. Sikandar, sensing a possible usurpation of the throne by Magre, chose to exert himself as the ruler c. 1391.

== Military campaigns ==
Sikandar Shah Miri,also known as Sikandar Butshikan

Except for a successful invasion of Ladakh under the command of Rai Magre, Sikandar did not annex any new territory. Soon after this victory, Magre instigated a rebellion and assassinated Sobha's (Sikandar's first wife) brother (Note: Named as Khunjyaraja.) before turning against Sikandar with his proteges. The rebellion was ably suppressed with aid from Laddaraja's men without even resorting to warfare and Magre was imprisoned, whence he committed suicide. (Note: Magre's soldiers had gathered at Vallamatha (unknown - doubtful whether any of the recensions preserved the name) for a scheduled faceoff at Pampore but dispersed after mistaking herds of cattle on the other bank of Jhelum as Sikandar's cavalry. Magre was chased by Sikandar himself and caught at Vitastapura.) Palas —probably, a Persian tribe— who aided Magre were brutally suppressed too.

In December 1398, Timur had camped on the banks of the Indus river and ordered Sikandar to pay tribute. Despite Sikandar's meek acceptance fearing a military fallout, the order was eventually waived by Timur himself upon being judged to be way above Sikandar's financial capacity. While the two did not meet, they shared a mutual admiration and Timur gifted a pair of male and female elephants to Sikandar. (Note: This episode presents one of the few episodes where Jonaraja's account can be corroborated by Persian sources. Jonaraja had held Timur to have gifted the elephants out of fearing Sikandar, despite being powerful enough to have had Delhi razed to ashes!) Sikandar was ecstatic on receiving them.

C. 1400, a successful war was waged against Firuz, the Hindu Shahi ruler of Ohind (var. Udabhandapura and Sahibhanga) after he refused to recognize Sikandar's suzerainty. Sikandar went on to marry Firuz's daughter Mera whilst giving away one of his daughters from Sobha for marriage to Firuz. Another successful campaign was mounted against Pala Deo (var. Billadeva), the Rajah of Jammu, after he refused to pay taxes; Jasrath Khokhar was installed as a vassal and Sikandar again entered into a matrimonial alliance with his daughter whilst giving away another of his daughters from Sobha for marriage to Pala Deo.

== Sociopolity ==
The overall economic condition was decent. Jonaraja remarks that the Goddess of Fortune found an abode in Sikandar — "the pleasure of [his] welfare elude[d] verbal description." A welfare state was installed; oppressive taxes were abolished while free schools and hospitals (Daru'l-Shifa) were opened for public use. Waqfs were endowed to shrines and numerous Sufi preachers from Central Asia were provided with jagirs and installed in positions of authority. (Note: Among them the most prominent were: Sayyid Hasan Shirazi, appointed as the Qazi of Kashmir; Sayyid Jalaluddin, a saint from Bukhara; and Baba Haji Adham, a logician from Balkh. Baharistan-i-shahi provides detailed information about these figures.) Land holdings were allotted to vast sections of society including scholars, religious figureheads and the poor. The office of Shaikhu'l-Islam was established to provide monetary stipends and alms to the needy, pilgrims, travelers, physicians, scholars and other deserving people. Sikandar was also the first Sultan to enact sharia — music, dance, gambling, and intoxicants were prohibited — and established the post of qadi for its application. He also began the imposition of jizya on non-Muslims.

=== Persecution of Hindus ===
Jonaraja advocates that Sikandar's rule terminated Kashmir's long-standing tolerant culture. So do Baharistan-i-shahi and Tohfatu'l-Ahbab, which note that Sikandar cleansed Kashmir of non-muslims. Sikandar is epithetized as ''butshikan", the "idol-breaker." Hasan Ali provides the most detailed narrative.

Sikandar commenced the destruction of Hindu and Buddhist shrines till, in the words of Jonaraja, no idol remained, even in the privacy of peoples' homes. Jonaraja mentions temples at Martand (Sun God), Vijayesvara (Shiva), Cakradhara (Vishnu), Suresvari (unknown), Varaha (Vishnu), and Tripuresvara (unknown) to have been destroyed by Sikandar. Hasan Ali adds three temples at Parihaspore, the Tarapitha temples at Iskander Pora, and a neighbouring Maha Shri Temple. Pseud. J notes of a colossal statue of Buddha being razed and melted to produce coins.

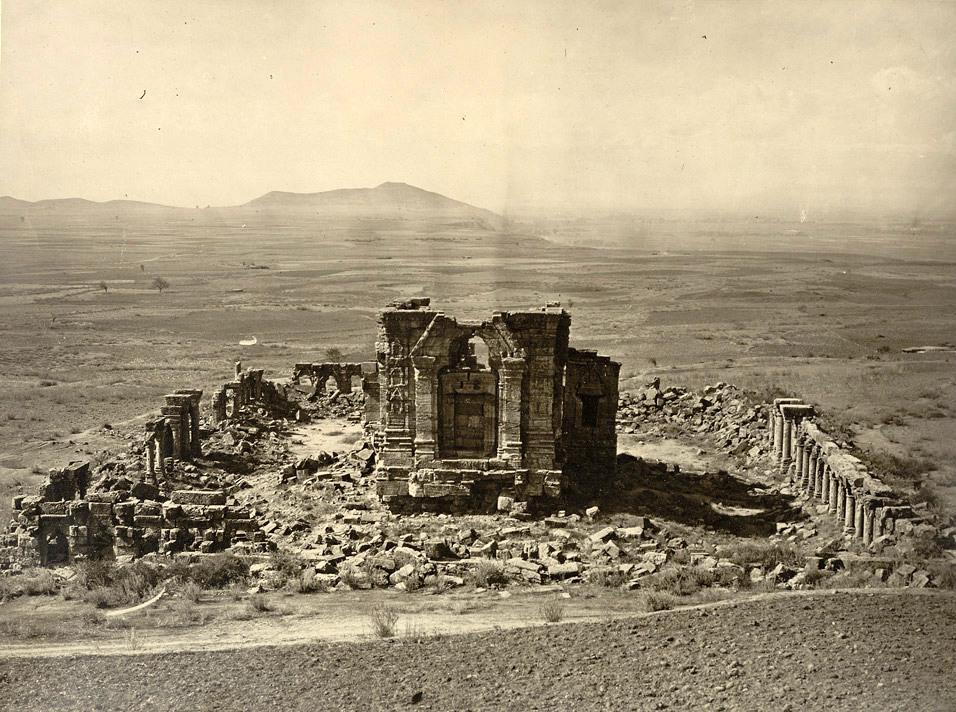
A 1868 photograph of the ruins of the Martand Sun Temple in Mattan, razed by Sikandar. Part of the damage to the demolished temple was also caused by later earthquakes.

Afterwards, Sikandar's focus fell on abolishing the teaching of Hinduism. All Brahmins unwilling to convert to Islam were taxed with Jizya. (Note: The tax was set at two pals of silver. Jonaraja snarks at those Brahmins who left their "superior class" in lieu of some material gains.) In contrast to Jonaraja, who mentions Sikandar's successor (Ali Shah) as having initiated forced conversions for the first time, Hasan Ali notes of forced conversions under Sikandar's tenure; he is stated to have massacred all those who had refused to convert. (Note: The zunnars of all these dead men weighed three ass-loads, when taken for incineration.)

==== Motivations and analysis ====
Upon a literary reading of Rajatarangini, Sikandar's zeal behind the Islamisation of society is attributable to Mir Muhammad Hamadani — an orthodox Sufi preacher — (Note: Son of the famed Mir Sayyid Ali Hamadani (1314-1384) of the Kubrawiya order who had migrated from Huttalàn (present-day Tajikistan) to Shibu'd-Din's Kashmir in the wake of Timurid invasions. Ali Hamadani is believed to have played the most significant role in the propagation of Islam in Kashmir.) who advocated the creation of a monolithic society based on Islam as the common denominator to the extent of prohibiting any maintenance of kafir shrines. In particular, a Brahman neo-convert — Suhabhatta (var. Suhaka Bhatt and Saifuddin) who served as Sikandar's counsel — was accused of instigating the King into "[taking] delight day and night in demolishing the sculptures of the gods." (Note: Hamadani went on to marry Suhabhatta's daughter after the death of his first wife (Bibi Taj Khatun).) Notably, in Baharistan-i-shahi, both Sikandar and Suhabhatta play equal roles, with particular significance accorded to Sikandar's religious conviction.

Chitralekha Zutshi and Richard G. Salomon uphold the claims of religious persecution but reject the idea only religious motives lay behind Sikandar's actions and instead call for a nuanced contextual reading of Rajatarangini, a work that was commissioned by Sikandar's successor, who wished to bring back the Brahminical elite into the royal fold and establish Sanskrit as an integral part of a Sultanate that strove to be cosmopolitan. According to Zutshi and Salomon, Sikandar's policies were guided by realpolitik and, like with the previous Hindu rulers, were essentially an attempt to secure Islamic political legitimacy by asserting state power of foreign Muslim rulers over Brahmans and gaining access to wealth controlled by Brahminical institutions. J. L. Bhan notes the sole extant example of sculpture (see below) from Sikandar's reign to challenge simplistic notions of religious persecution.

Walter Slaje disagrees about such proposed absence of religious motivation, in part, given the differential rituals of destruction undertaken by Hindu and Muslim kings with the latter rendering sites inoperable for long passages of time by massive pollution or outright conversion. Slaje however concludes that the fierce opposition of Hindus to foreign Muslim rulers, including Sikandar, primarily stemmed from their aversion to the slow disintegration of Kashmiri caste society under Islamic influence; Jonaraja explicitly mocks Hamadani's rejection of hereditary caste hierarchies. Mohammed Ishaq Khan emphasizes on the centrality of caste in understanding Jonaraja's reception of Shah Miri — he notes that even Hindu figures like Lal Ded had found no place in the Rajatarangini(s) and other Kashmiri Pandit corpus of history, until recent times. Author Hakim Sameer Hamdani highlights that medieval accounts of widespread destruction of non-Muslim religious sites by Sikandar come from both Hindu as well as Muslim sources, but believes that hagiogrpahical and historical accounts by Muslims might have exaggerated such iconoclasm to display religious devoutness.

Fringe revisionist authors completely reject the narratives of persecution and accuse the Brahmin chroniclers of wanton bias and myth-making, stemming from their personal jealousy at losing socio-economic dominance.

== Art and architecture ==
The locality of Nowhatta was constructed by Sikandar and his royal palace was established at the town center. He constructed the Jamia Masjid at Srinagar—considered to be the finest example of Indo-Saracenic archirecture in Kashmir—, (Note: The architect was one Khwaja Sadru'd-Din from Khorasan.) and two other mosques at Bijbehara and Bavan. The two-storied Bavan mosque was enclosed by a garden and doubled as Sikandar's spring-resort. Sikandar also commissioned a new burial ground—Mazar-i-Salatin, on the bank of Jhelum near Zaina Kadal locale in downtown Srinagar—for the royals and elite.

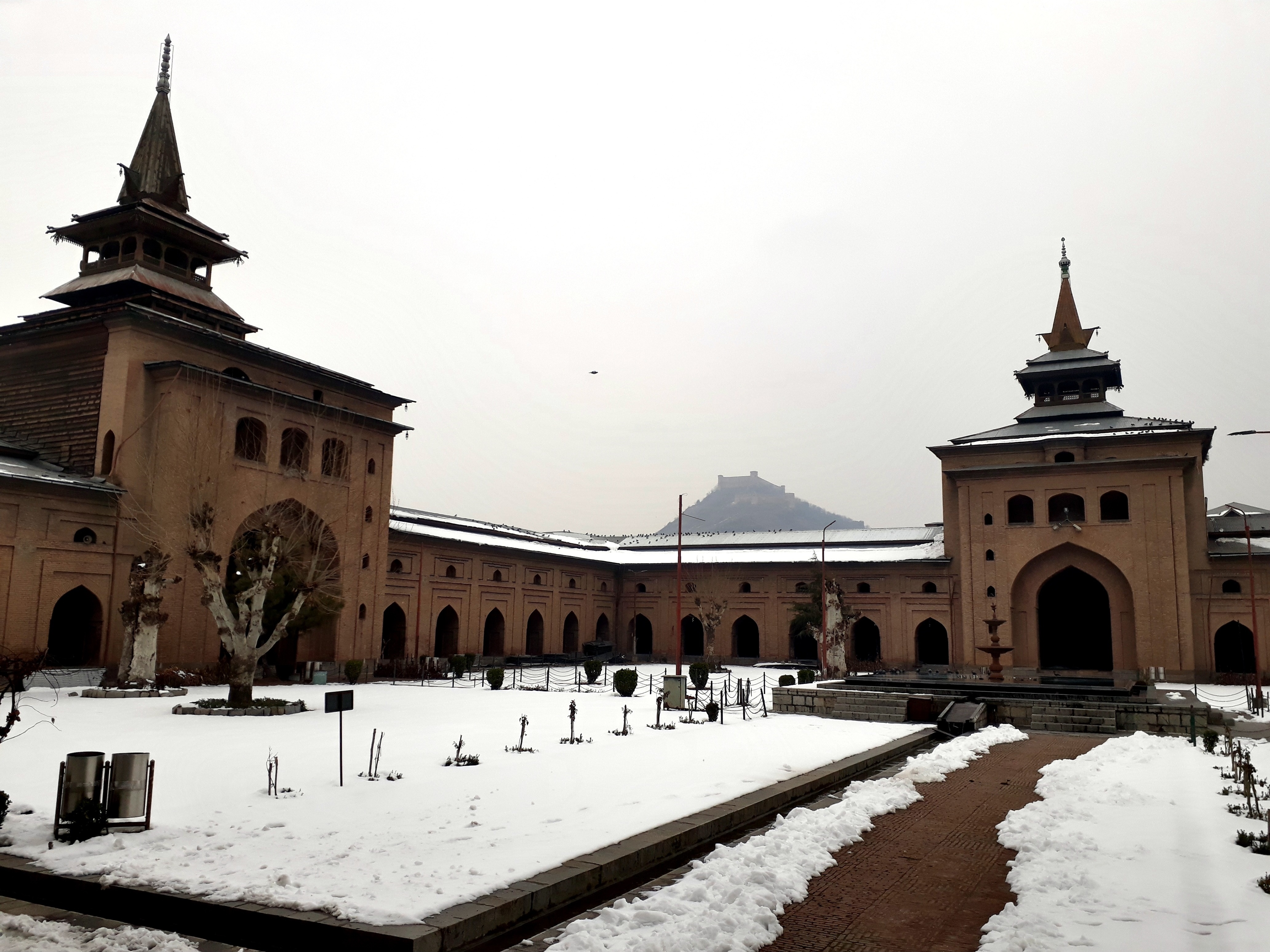
Jamia Masjid. Built in 1394 CE by Sikandar.

Numerous scholars arrived from Central Asia in his court: Sayiid Ahmad of Isfahan drafted a commentary on a Firazi text and also wrote epistles, Sayyid Muhammad Khawari wrote a commentary on Lum'at ul-I'tiqaad as well as another work (Khwar Nameh) of unknown genre, and Muhammad Baihaqi composed poems eulogizing Sikandar. The first stone sculpture of Kashmir—a four-armed Brahma, argued to be one of the finest in the history of the subcontinent—was sculpted by son of a Buddhist Sanghapati in 1409 and dedicated to Sikandar.

== Personal life ==
Sikandar is believed to have had a puritanical temperament, and abstained from wine, festivities, and music — in tune with the laws decreed for his subjects. Among his closest confidants were Suhabhatta, Sankara (chief physician), and Laddaraja.

=== Issues, death, and succession ===
Sikandar was married to at-least three women: Mera; an unnamed daughter of Pala Deo; and, Sobha about whom Jonaraja does not provide any details. (Note: Hasan speculates that Shobha might be the unnamed daughter of Pala Deo that is, SIkandar had two wives. It is likely implausible since Sikandar had bequeathed one of Shobha's (adopted) daughter to Deo!) He had at least five sons—Firuz (adopted by Sobha; sent alongside Hamadani, in his return journey to Iran), Shadi Khan (adopted by Sobha), Mir Khan (from Mira), Shahi Khan (from Mira), and Muhammad Khan (from Mira)—, and at least two daughters (both adopted by Sobha). (Note: Hasan gets these details wrong: he was not an expert in Sanskrit and had to mostly depend upon Dutt's error-ridden translation, which in the opinion of Slaje, "[is] completely unsuitable for purposes of research.") Sobha is understood to have been likely infertile.

Sikandar is claimed to have met a prolonged and painful death, (Note: To Jonaraja (as in the case of Kalhana), Kashmir was an "ethical space" dictated by karma. The tyrants always met unhappy deaths, if not assassinated. However, Jonaraja is careful to assert that the God of Death was angered not at him but at Suhabhatta; he had to merely atone for the sins of his subject.) seemingly from elephantiasis, in April 1413. (Note: A chronogram in Tarikh-i Hassan reports the year as 1417.) He was buried in Mazar-i-Salatin.

After his death, Sikandar's eldest son Mir was anointed as the Sultan, having adopted the title of Ali Shah. Two years later, Mir was succeeded by Shadi Khan, who adopted the name Zain-ul-Abidin.

== Legacy ==
Under Ali Shah's regime, Suhabhatta became the Prime Minister and the de facto ruler; Jonaraja claims that persecution increased manifold with forced conversions becoming commonplace, Hindu customs being banned, and Brahmans being prohibited to leave the territory despite being forced into unemployment. A regime of tolerance was however re-introduced under Zain-ul-Abidin, with Suhabhatta dead from tuberculosis; Hindu artists were provided with state-patronage, temples were rebuilt, Brahmans-in-exile were brought back, taxes reduced, and neo-Muslims were allowed to convert back. (Note: Jonaraja—ever true to casting Kashmir as an ethical space—remarks that Mera's god-gifted purpose laid in saving Kashmir from Sikandar's depredations.) Tohfatu'l-Ahbab, writing in the 16th century, blamed the poor state of Islam in the valley on Zain.

Despite these reverses, the Islamisation of elite politics meant very few caste groups other than Brahmans took the opportunity of re-conversion and a largely irreversible change set-in in post-Sikandar Kashmir. The Hindus receded into relative political unimportance, with Pandit nobles being last prominent in the court of Hasan Shah, Zain's grandson. Nonetheless, Hinduism flourished among the masses even a century after Sikandar's death. (Note: The biographer of the Nūrbakshī shaykh, Mir Shams-al Din Iraqi who visited Kashmir in 1487 CE, wrote: "Such atheistic and idolatrous practices continue to be observed in the houses of scholars, theologians and leading personalities of this land (Kashmir). They observe all the festivals and feasts of infidels and polytheists. The family members of the elders and leading persons of this land, especially their womenfolk, do not do anything without the permission of the infidels and permission of astrologers. In fact, in all activities of daily life like eating, drinking, sleeping, rising from sleep, travel and rest, astronomers and polytheists have a role to play.")
