= Hargopal Kaul =

Indian historian

- Born: Hargopal Kaul c. 1848; Lahore, Punjab, British India
- Died: 1923 (aged ~75)
- Occupations: Poet, historian, journalist, social reformer
- Known for: Early Urdu histories of Kashmir; initiatives in girls’ education; sobriquet “Sher-e-Kashmir”
- Notable work: Guldasta-i-Kashmir; Tarikh-i-Kashmir; Gopāl-nāma
- Movement: Social reform; early Kashmiri press

Hargopal Kaul (pen-name Khasta; c. 1848–1923) was an Indian poet, historian, journalist and social reformer who wrote early Urdu histories of Kashmir, notably Tarikh-i-Kashmir (1877) and Guldasta-i-Kashmir (1883). He engaged with famine, taxation and schooling, advocated girls’ education, and became associated with reformist currents of the late nineteenth century. Later scholarship has examined how his histories imagined Kashmir’s past and community.

== Early life ==
Khasta was born in 1848 in Lahore, in the Punjab Province of British India, into a Kashmiri Pandit family with ancestral roots in Srinagar. He worked in Lahore as a teacher and pleader before turning to literary and journalistic pursuits; contemporary and later syntheses place him within Kashmiri associations and British Indian service circles there.

== Activism ==
In the 1870s Khasta’s organising and writings brought him into conflict with the Dogra administration. Sufi records that he was “deported from Kashmir … in 1294 A.H. = 1877 A.D. ‘for fabricating lies against His Highness’,” and that while in Lahore he edited the Urdu weekly Khair-Khwah-i-Kashmir (1882–83). A later Kashmiri account narrates his arrest during communal tension over a mullah's complaint, his trial and honourable release, followed by externment from the state; these events cemented his public profile.

=== Social reform ===
A consistent theme in Kaul’s public speeches and writing was social reform, particularly in the sphere of marriage customs and women’s status. Diaspora periodicals recall that “the main theme of the speeches was social reform, especially in marriages, [and] widow remarriage,” alongside campaigns for dress reform and community uplift.

Marriage customs

Writers in the Kashmiri Pandit press associate Kaul’s reformism with efforts to **curb ostentation and simplify marriage practices**, treating lavish, debt-creating ceremonies as socially harmful; the same retrospectives group his marriage-reform advocacy with broader critiques of ritual excess. A succinct statement of his position appears in P. N. K. Bamzai's synthesis (1994), which summarises Kaul’s admonitions against ruinous wedding expenditure:

“O people of my community! You complain of poverty, yet you indulge in lavish spending on marriages that leads you to penury. Is it not foolish to sacrifice your future for a few days of hollow ostentation?”

Widow remarriage

Multiple accounts explicitly state that Kaul **advocated widow remarriage**, a stance that met strong resistance from conservative sections of society. A 2005 profile notes that he was “for widow-remarriage” while differing with some Arya Samaj positions, and that his campaign in Kashmir met “deaf ears,” though he persisted with it. Later community histories also connect his reform work with early Kashmiri organisations promoting widow remarriage and women’s education.

=== Education reform ===
A 2005 retrospective states that Kaul helped initiate girls’ schooling in Srinagar, first under the headship of his daughter Padmavati, and expanded the effort into a chain of schools; a government committee on girls’ education reportedly formed with Kaul as president. Regional press histories also note non-state educational and journalistic initiatives in the same milieu.

== Writings and profession ==
Kaul wrote across genres—history, poetry (including masnavis) and journalism. His Tarikh-i-Kashmir (1877) and the two-part Guldasta-i-Kashmir (Lahore: Farsi Arya Press, 1883) are among the earliest **Urdu** historical treatments of Kashmir and are cited in later historiography and gazetteer-like syntheses. A profile in 2005 describes Guldasta-i-Kashmir as written in “free-flowing” Urdu and emphasises its use of classical sources and on-the-ground observations. University bibliographies of modern Kashmir studies also list Guldasta-i-Kashmir as a key Urdu source.

=== Themes ===
Commentators note a dominant strain of **pathos and intellectual critique** in Kaul’s historical writing—especially in Guldasta-i-Kashmir—lamenting the eclipse of learning by rigid observance. As Chitralekha Zutshi summarises this register:

“The flame of wisdom that once illuminated this garden (Kashmir) is now dimmed by the smoke of hollow ritual. We cling to the shadows of the past, forgetting the essence of knowledge.”

Kaul’s poetic output included the masnavi Gopāl-nāma, which Kashmiri association publications describe as versifying the condition of Kashmir and exposing “court intrigues”; he is also credited with satirical pieces such as Narsingh Autar. He edited or contributed to periodicals such as Khair-Khwah-i-Kashmir and Subh-i-Kashmir within the Kashmiri diaspora press in Lahore.

== Family (Kaul–Vakil) ==
Khasta’s younger brother was Pandit Saligram (Salik) Kaul, also active in journalism and politics; association publications and later compendia discuss the “Kaul brothers” in connection with arrests and exile (including Saligram’s incarceration at Bahu Fort, Jammu). His daughter Padmavati is recorded as heading his first girls’ school.

The wider Kaul–Vakil line remained prominent in Kashmiri journalism. Pandit Shamboo Nath Kaul Vakil launched the Urdu weekly Vakil (Srinagar), which Pushkar (Poshkar) Nath Kaul Vakil later converted into a daily; Pushkar Nath Kaul Vakil later **launched the English newspaper Samachar Post from Srinagar in 1988**; the title was subsequently edited by his sons, **Kamlaish Kaul Vakil** and **Sushil Vakil** (described as editor in 2004). The outlet’s official pages describe it as “J&K’s first English daily,” established in 1964, “owned and operated by Vakil Publications” and listing a New Delhi address; these are **self-descriptions** by the publication.

== Legacy ==
=== “Sher-e-Kashmir” ===
Khasta is remembered in regional publications as “Sher-e-Kashmir” (Lion of Kashmir), a sobriquet used for him in retrospective accounts prior to its later association with other political figures. Community sources link the epithet to his **defiance** of authority and his **reform campaigning**.

==== Legend of the iron cage ====
A legend attached to the epithet recounts that when Khasta and his brother Saligram were incarcerated by the Dogra authorities, Hargopal was paraded in a cage used for transporting wild animals; onlookers likened him to a lion unjustly caged for defying the regime, and the epithet stuck. This anecdote appears in later community histories and memoir literature and is presented as a popular tradition rather than a contemporaneous official record. A 2005 profile notes that on his permitted return, Kaul received a “rousing reception,” which “justified his sobriquet of ‘lion of Kashmir’.”

=== Assessment ===
Sufi’s synthesis cites Kaul both as a source and as an actor in the emergent Kashmiri public sphere of the 1870s–80s. Modern academic treatments discuss how his histories negotiate identity, homeland and plurality, situating his work in debates over Kashmir’s past.

== Works ==
- Tarikh-i-Kashmir (Urdu), 1877.
- Guldasta-i-Kashmir (Urdu), 2 vols., Lahore: Farsi Arya Press, 1883.
- Gopāl-nāma (masnavi), date uncertain; referenced in Kashmiri association publications.

== See also ==
- History of Kashmir
