= Haider Shah Miri =

Sultan of Kashmir from 1470 to 1472

Haider Shah حیدر شاہ
- Sultan of Kashmir; Shah

10th Sultan of Kashmir
- Reign: 12 May 1470 – 13 April 1472
- Predecessor: Zain-ul-Abidin
- Successor: Hasan Shah
- Died: 13 April 1472; Kashmir, Shah Mir Sultanate
- Burial: Kashmir
Names
- Haji Haider Shah Miri
- Dynasty: Shah Mir
- Father: Zain-ul-Abidin
- Religion: Sunni Islam

Haider Shah Miri (Kashmiri and Persian: حیدر شاہ میری) also known by his given name Hāji Khān (حاجی خان) or simply by his regnal name Haider Shah was the tenth Sultan of Kashmir.

== Life ==
=== Ascension to the throne ===
During the last days of Zain-ul-Abidin reign, his three sons, Adam Khan, Haji Khan and Bahram Khan rebelled against him but he took energetic measures to crush them. He was succeeded by his son Haji Khan, who took the title of Haidar Khan.

=== Reign ===
Haji Khan succeeded his father Zain-ul-Abidin and took the title of Shah. Haider ruled from 12 May 1470 to 13 April 1472 and was succeeded by Hasan Shah.
