= Thanamandi =

- Town
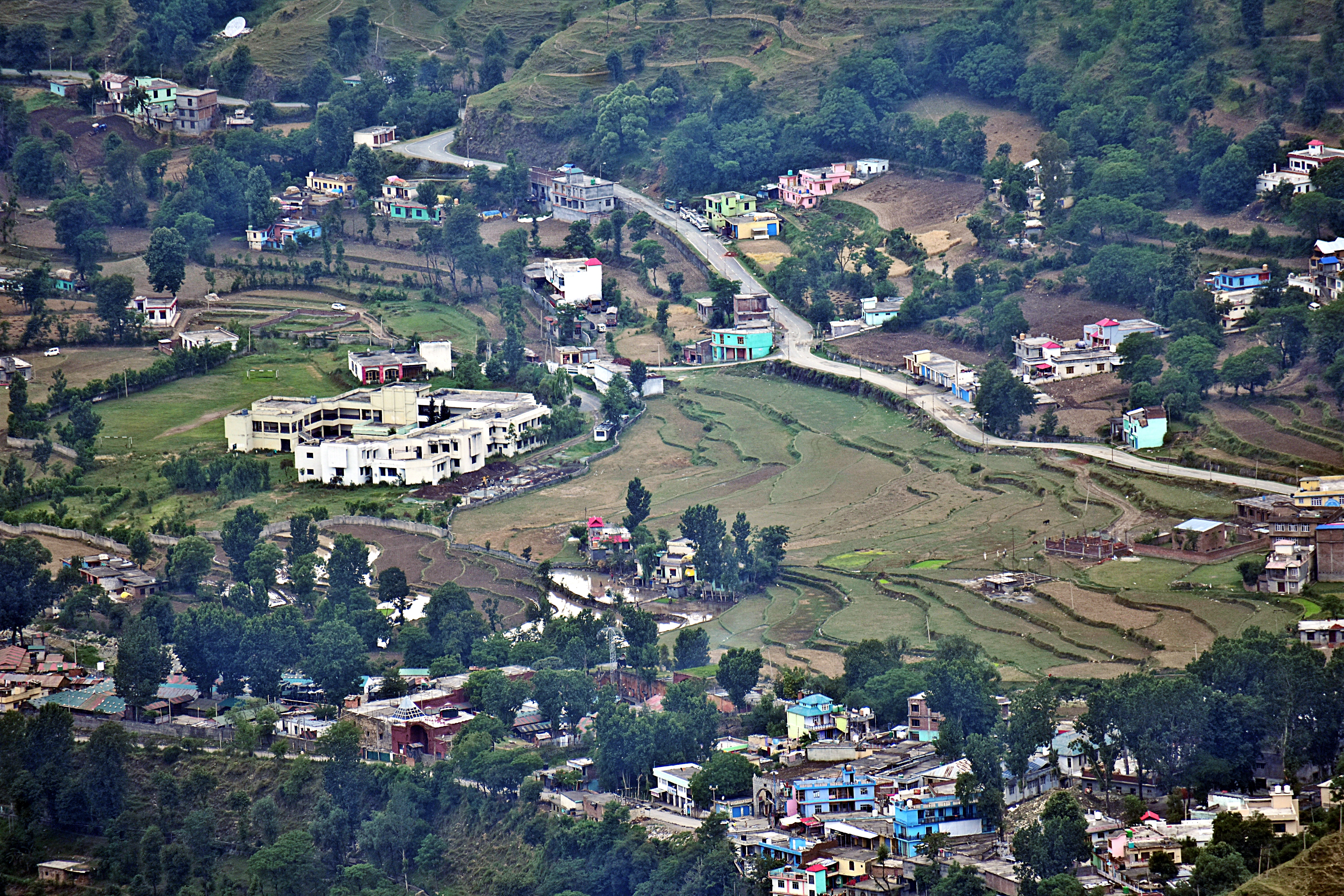

- Location in Jammu and Kashmir, India Thanamandi (India)
- Coordinates: 33.55°N 74.38°E
- Country: India
- Union Territory: Jammu and Kashmir
- District: Rajouri
- Elevation: 1,725 m (5,659 ft)

Population (2011)
  - Total: 7,204

Languages
  - Official: Gojri, Dogri, Hindi, Urdu, Kashmiri, English
- Time zone: UTC+5:30 (IST)
- PIN: 185212
- Vehicle registration: JK-11

Thanamandi is a town and a municipal committee in the Rajouri district in the Indian union territory of Jammu and Kashmir. Thanamandi lies on the Mughal Road between Rajouri and Bufliaz.

== Significance ==
Thanamandi lies 23 kilometres (14 mi) from Rajouri, the district headquarters, on the Mughal Road, the route across the Pir Panjal mountain pass toward Srinagar. Historically, this route was an important footpath to obtain feed for cattle. The building of the Mughal Road added vehicle traffic bound for Srinagar. It was the site of battle between Shah Miri Sultan Ali Shah and his younger brother Zain-ul-Abidin in 1420. Zain'l-Abidin defeated Ali Shah with the help of Raja Jasrat.

Thanamandi has religious significance as the home of the most important Sufi saint, Baba Ghulam Shah Badshah, whose mausoleum is at Shahdara Sharief in the town.

Thanamandi still has some forts that were built during the time of the Mughals. It may have taken its name from being a trade market ("mandi") during those times.

== Demographics ==
Religion in Thanamandi (2011)
1. Islam (94.2%)
2. Hinduism (5.45%)
3. Sikhism (0.24%)
4. Christianity (0.09%)
5. Buddhism (0.04%)
6. Not Stated (0.02%)

As of 2011 India census, Thanamandi had a population of 7,204. Males constitute 53% of the population and females 47%; 12% of the population is under 6 years of age. The literacy rate of 60%, higher than the national average of 59.5%: male literacy is 69%, and female literacy is 49%.

== Transport ==
=== Road ===
Thanamandi is well-connected by road to other places in Jammu and Kashmir and India by the NH 144A.

=== Rail ===
Thanamandi doesn't have its own railway station. The nearest railway station is Jammu Tawi railway station located at a distance of 171 kilometres.

=== Air ===
The nearest airport is Jammu Airport located at a distance of 180 kilometres.

== See also ==
- Jammu and Kashmir
- Rajouri
- Sunderbani
