= Gulibagh =

- Union Council
- Country: Pakistan
- Province: Khyber Pakhtunkhwa
- District: Swat

Population (2017)
  - Total: 32,483
- Time zone: UTC+5 (PST)

Gulibagh is a town and union council in the Swat District in the Khyber Pakhtunkhwa province of Pakistan.

The literal meaning of Gulibagh in Pashto is "garden of flowers".

As an administrative unit, unon council Gulibagh includes: Alabad, Dakorak, Landake, Gulibagh (the town), Waliabad, Roria and Alamganj.

Gulibagh is further divided into small mohallas: Rorya, Waliabad, Bodababa, Spina Khawra, Shindand, Bamano Cham, Kalay and Maira. Most of the village population is located in the kalay.
