= Chitralekha Zutshi =

Chitralekha Zutshi (born 1972) is an Indian historian of Kashmir and an endowed chair Professor of History at the College of William & Mary, Williamsburg, Virginia, United States.

== Education ==
Zutshi received her doctorate in history from Tufts University.

== Works ==
Her first monograph Languages of Belonging: Islam, Regional Identity, and the Making of Kashmir was published by Permanent Black in 2003; subsequent reprints were published by C. Hurst & Co. and Oxford University Press. The book traces the evolution of Kashmiriyat with time and drew significant praise. Yoginder Sikand, reviewing for Journal of the Royal Asiatic Society commended the research and agreed with Zutshi's arguments. A review in the South Asia Research found Zutshi's to be pioneering scholarship that would be a must-read for any scholar working on Kashmir.

Her second monograph was Kashmir’s Contested Pasts: Narratives, Sacred Geographies and the Historical Imagination (Oxford University Press, 2014). It was reviewed over multiple journals.

In 2018, she published an edited volume on Kashmir (Cambridge University Press) to favorable reviews. Her latest publication has been Kashmir: Oxford India Short Introductions.
