= Walter Slaje =

Austrian Indologist and scholar

- Born: 17 June 1954 (age 71)
- Occupation: Indologist

Walter Slaje (born 17 June 1954 in Graz) is an Austrian Indologist.

== Life ==
From 1984 to 1995, Slaje was employed at the University Library of Graz as a subject specialist for Oriental Languages and Cultures and as head of the collection of scientific estates. He studied Indology, Tibetology and Buddhism at the University of Vienna, where he was awarded a doctorate in 1983. After a stay as an Alexander von Humboldt Research Fellow at the University of Hamburg (1989–1991), he completed his habilitation in Indology at the University of Vienna in 1993. In the same year he was awarded the Kardinal Innitzer Advancement Prize for the Humanities. From October 1995 until his retirement in September 2019, he taught as tenured full professor of Indology at the Martin Luther University Halle-Wittenberg. In 2000, he was elected to the Administrative Board of the Helmuth von Glasenapp Foundation (Mainz), which he has chaired since 2020. In 2002 he was elected Corresponding Member and in 2010 Full Member of the Academy of Sciences and Literature in Mainz. Until its closure (2020) he acted as Director of the Centre for Historiography and Intellectual Culture of Kashmir established by the Academy of Sciences and Literature (Mainz) at the University of Halle. He was elected chairman of the Deutsche Morgenländische Gesellschaft (DMG) from 2012 to 2021. From 1998 to 2009, he was the editor of the Indology section of the Zeitschrift der Deutschen Morgenländischen Gesellschaft (ZDMG).

== Works ==
- zus. mit N. Rastegar: Uto von Melzer (1881–1961); Werk und Nachlaß eines österreichischen Iranisten. Wien: Verl. d. Österr. Akad. d. Wiss. 1987 ISBN 3-7001-0804-4
- Katalog der Sanskrit-Handschriften der Österreichischen Nationalbibliothek (Sammlungen Marcus Aurel Stein und Carl Alexander von Hügel). Wien: Verl. d. Österr. Akad. d. Wiss. 1990 ISBN 3-7001-1284-X
- Śāradā: deskriptiv-synchrone Schriftkunde zur Bearbeitung kaschmirischer Sanskrit-Manuskripte; auf der Grundlage von Kuśalas Ghaṭakharpara-Gūḍhadīpikā. Reinbek: Wezler 1993 ISBN 3-88587-016-9
- Vom Mokṣopāya-Śāstra zum Yogavāsiṣṭha-Mahārāmāyaṇa: philologische Untersuchungen zur Entwicklungs- und Überlieferungsgeschichte eines indischen Lehrwerks mit Anspruch auf Heilsrelevanz. Wien: Verl. der Österr. Akad. der Wiss. 1994 ISBN 3-7001-2133-4
- Medieval Kashmir and the Science of History. [The University of Texas at Austin, Madden Lecture 2003-4]. Austin 2004.
- Upanischaden; Arkanum des Veda. Aus dem Sanskrit übersetzt und hrsg. Frankfurt/M: Verlag der Weltreligionen 2009.
- Néti néti; On the meaning of an Upaniṣadic citation of some renown in Hindu texts and Western minds. [AWL. Abhandlungen der Geistes- und sozialwissenschaftlichen Klasse. 2010, 4.] Mainz 2010.
- Suum cuique; Zur ideengeschichtlichen Verankerung einiger indischer Gewaltphänomene. [AWL. Abhandlungen der Geistes- und sozialwissenschaftlichen Klasse. 2012, 3.] Mainz 2012.
- Trimūrti; Zur Verwandlung eines inklusivistischen Dominanzbegriffs in eine monotheistische Trinitätslehre. [AWL. Abhandlungen der Geistes- und sozialwissenschaftlichen Klasse. 2012, 4.] Mainz 2012.
- Kingship in Kaśmīr (AD 1148‒1459); From the Pen of Jonarāja, Court Paṇḍit to Sulṭān Zayn al-‛Ābidīn. Critically Edited with an Annotated Translation, Indexes and Maps. [Studia Indologica Universitatis Halensis. 7.] Halle 2014. ISBN 978-3-86977-088-8
- Bacchanal im Himmel und andere Proben aus Maṅkha. [AWL. Veröffentlichungen der Indologischen Kommission. 3.] Mainz 2015. ISBN 978-3-447-10456-2
- Wo unter schön belaubtem Baume Yama mit den Göttern zecht: Zweisprachige Proben vedischer Lyrik. [Indologica Marpurgensia. 9.] München 2019. ISBN 978-3-87410-148-6
- Harṣa von Kaschmir. Ein politisches Sittengemälde aus dem indischen Mittelalter. Kalhaṇas Rājataraṅgiṇī (Buch 7) mit annotierter Übersetzung kritisch neu herausgegeben von Walter Slaje. [Akademie der Wissenschaften und der Literatur, Mainz. Veröffentlichungen der Kommission für Außereuropäische Sprachen und Kulturen. 4.]. Wiesbaden 2019. ISBN 978-3-447-11236-9
- Brahmā’s Curse. Facets of Political and Social Violence in Premodern Kashmir. [Studia Indologica Universitatis Halensis. 13]. Halle 2019. ISBN 978-3-86977-199-1
- Kaschmir unter den Šāhmīrīden. Śrīvaras Jaina- und Rājataraṅgiṇī, A.D. 1451 – 1486. Vier zeitgeschichtliche Herrscherviten eines indo-persischen Sultanats. [Studia Indologica Universitatis Halensis. 20]. Halle 2022. ISBN 978-3-86977-252-3
- Vájra. Zur Schleuderwaffe im Rigveda. (Conundrums in Indology. III). [Studia Indologica Universitatis Halensis. 21]. Halle 2022. ISBN 978-3-86977-253-0
