= Shrivara =

15th century Kashmiri historian

Shrivara [Śrīvara] (15th century) wrote a work on the history of Kashmir that adds to the previous works of Kalhana and Jonaraja, thereby providing an update of the history of Kashmir till 1486 CE. Śrīvara served at the courts of the four Šāhmīrī Sulṭāns Zayn al-ʿĀbidīn, Ḥaydar Šāh, Ḥasan Šāh and Maḥmūd Šāh until 1486, when Fatḥ Šāh took power for the first time. Holding this office since 1459, Śrīvara concentrated on writing the history he had personally witnessed. Unlike his predecessors Kalhaṇa and Jonarāja, who had completed the history of Kashmir in retrospect and continued it up to their respective times, Śrīvara, as a contemporary historian, was left with only occasional retrospective additions going back to 1451. His accounts, the Jaina- and Rājataraṅgiṇīs, written as an eyewitness, are characterised by a remarkably detailed density that hardly leaves out any aspect of his coeval horizon of observation and reflection on everyday Kashmiri culture, court life, politics, religion and society. The consolidation of the religious and political influence of a group of Sayyids, who had migrated from Baihaq in Iran under earlier Šāhmīrī Sulṭāns such as Sikandar, and the dynamics triggered by their attempts under Ḥasan Šāh and Maḥmūd Šāh to participate in the reign, culminated in a devastating civil war between factions of indigenous Kashmiris (kāśmīrika) and the immigrants from abroad (paradeśīya, vaideśika). These events are of particular research interest for tracing the historical ramifications of the Islamisation process in Kashmir. In terms of richness of detail of everyday culture also in its material aspects, Śrīvara’s work is by far the most abundant source on Indo-Persian rule in early modern India and the living conditions under omnipresent threats of famines, natural disasters and warfare. Śrīvara’s work breaks off with Maḥmūd Šāh’s (first) dethronement followed by Fatḥ Šāh’s ascension to the throne. The abrupt end of his account was however not caused by Śrīvara’s death. Nineteen years later we hear from him again in the prelude to his Sanskrit translation of Jāmi’s (1414–1492) Persian Yusof o Zoleykhā, entitled the Kathākautuka. Śrīvara dated his prologue April 18, 1505. The sudden interruption of Śrīvara’s Rājataraṅgiṇī, coinciding with the transition of power in 1486, should therefore be sought in his removal from the position of court biographer. Śrīvara had completed his Sanskrit rendering of Jāmi’s Persian composition (1483) only twenty-two years after its publication in Herat.
