= Kashipur =

Kashipur may refer to:

== Places ==
- Kashi (Varanasi), also Kashipuri and Kashipur, another name of Varanasi, a holy city in Uttar Pradesh, India
- Kashipur, Uttarakhand, a city and a municipal corporation in Udham Singh Nagar District in the state of Uttarakhand, India
- Kashipur, Rayagada, located in the district of Rayagada in the state of Odisha, India
- Kashipur, Purulia, located in the district of Purulia in the state of West Bengal, India
- Chak Kashipur, a census town under Nadakhali police station of Alipore sadar subdivision in South 24 Parganas district in the state of West Bengal, India
- Cossipore (also spelt Cossipur, Kashipur), a neighbourhood in north Kolkata in the state of West Bengal, India
- Kashipur, Raebareli, a village in Uttar Pradesh, India

== Electoral constituencies ==
- Kashipur Assembly constituency (disambiguation)
- Kashipur, Uttarakhand Assembly constituency - in Udham Singh Nagar district, Uttarakhand, India
- Kashipur, West Bengal Assembly constituency - in Purulia district, West Bengal, India
- Kashipur-Belgachhia Assembly constituency - in Kolkata district, West Bengal, India
- Cossipur Assembly constituency - former constituency in Kolkata district, West Bengal, India

== Community development blocks ==
- Kashipur (community development block) - in Purulia district, West Bengal, India

== See also ==
- Kashi (disambiguation)
