= Kashi =

Kashi or Kaashi may refer to:

== Places ==
- Varanasi (historically known as "Kashi"), a holy city in India
  - Kingdom of Kashi, an ancient kingdom in the same place, one of the sixteen Mahajanapadas
  - Kashi Vishwanath Temple, Varanasi
- Uttarkashi (lit. "The Kashi of North"), a town in Uttarakhand
- Kashgar, a city in Xinjiang, China
  - Kashgar Prefecture, the prefecture encompassing the city
- Kashi, Hamadan, a village in Hamadan Province, Iran
- Kashi, Hormozgan, a village in Hormozgan Province, Iran
- Kashan, a city in the province of Isfahan, Iran

== Film and television ==
- Kashi from Village, a 2005 Indian film
- Kashi – Ab Na Rahe Tera Kagaz Kora, a 2010 Indian television series on Imagine TV
- Kaashi, a character from the 2018 film Kaashi in Search of Ganga
- Kashi Nath, protagonist of the 1996 Indian film Ghatak: Lethal

== Other uses ==
- Kashi, a short form of Kashani, a surname
- Kashi (company), U.S. manufacturer of foods, owned by Kellogg Company
- Japanese ship Kashi, several ships
- Kashi (actor), Indian actor
- Kasha, roasted whole-grain buckwheat or buckwheat groats
- Yocheved Kashi (1929-2022), Iran-born Israeli first woman paratrooper in the Israel Defense Forces

== See also ==
- Kasi (disambiguation)
- Kashinath (disambiguation)
- Kashipur (disambiguation)
- Varanasi (disambiguation)
- Banares (disambiguation)
- Banaras (disambiguation)
