= Palaniappan =

Palaniappan may refer to:

- 21715 Palaniappan, a main-belt asteroid
- B. Palaniappan (1930–2014), Indian gynaecologist
- K. L. Palaniappan, Malaysian businessman
- Karu Pazhaniappan, Indian film director
- Murugan Pal or Murugan Palaniappan (1966–2012), Indian entrepreneur
- P. Palaniappan, Indian politician, Member of the Legislative Assembly of Tamil Nadu
- P. Chidambaram or Palaniappan Chidambaram (born 1945), Indian politician with the Indian National Congress and former Union Minister of Home Affairs
- S. M. Palaniappan (born 1930), former Member of the Legislative Assembly of Tamil Nadu
- Palaniapan Meiyappan, Malaysian cricketer
