= Kashinath =

Kashinath may refer to:

- Shiva, the patron deity of the Kashi Vishwanath Temple in Varanasi, India
- Kashinath, father of 16th-century Indian poet Keshavdas
- Kashinath (actor) (1951–2018), Indian actor and director in Kannada-language films
- Kashinath Ghanekar (1940–1986), Indian actor in Marathi-language films
- Kashi Nath Pandey, Indian politician
- K. N. Pandita, Indian historian
- Kashinath Trimbak Telang (1850–1893), Indian judge and Indologist
- Kashinath Singh (born 1925), Hindustani classical musician and sitar player
- Kashinath (1943 film), an Indian film from 1943 in Hindi and Bengali
- Kashinath, Telugu dubbed version of Tamil film Kasi
- Kashinathuni Vishwanath (1930–2023), Indian filmmaker
- Kashi Nath, fictional protagonist of the 1996 Indian film Ghatak

== See also ==
- Kashi (disambiguation)
