= Kaasi =

Kaasi may refer to:

== Films ==
- Kaasi (2004 film), an Indian film in Telugu
- Kaasi, the Telugu version of the 2018 Indian Tamil language film Kaali

== Fauna ==
- Chiton kaasi, a species of marine mollusc in the genus Chiton
- Eulimella kaasi, a pyram species found in Cape Verde
- Lepidochitona kaasi, a species of Lepidochitona marine mollusc
- Notoplax kaasi, a species of Notoplax marine mollusc
- Puposyrnola kaasi, a pyram species found in the waters off Cape Verde

== See also ==
- Kasi (disambiguation)
