= Japanese ship Kashi =

Several ships have been named Kashi (樫 / 橿 / かし; Japanese for "live oak"):

- Japanese destroyer Kashi (1916), a Momo-class destroyer of the Imperial Japanese Navy (IJN); transferred to Manchukuo and renamed Hai Wei (海威) in 1937; returned to IJN and renamed Kaii (海威) in 1942; sunk in 1944
- Japanese destroyer Kashi (1944), a Matsu-class destroyer of the Imperial Japanese Navy; scrapped in 1948
- JDS Kashi (PF-283), a Kusu-class patrol frigate of the Japan Maritime Self-Defense Force, formerly USS Pasco (PF-6)

== See also ==
- Kashi Maru, a Japanese auxiliary minelayer/merchant ship during World War II
- Kashi (disambiguation)
- Kasi (disambiguation)
