= Varanasi (disambiguation) =

Varanasi is a city in the southeastern part of Indian state of Uttar Pradesh.

Varanasi may also refer to:

== Places ==
Administrative divisions

- Varanasi division
  - Varanasi district
    - Varanasi Tehsil

Varanasi city

- Varanasi cantonment
- Varanasi Junction railway station
- Lal Bahadur Shastri International Airport, Varanasi

== Films ==
- Varanasi (film), an upcoming Indian film by S. S. Rajamouli
- 2006: Varanasi the Untold, an unreleased Indian Hindi-language thriller film

== Others ==
Electoral constituencies

- Varanasi (Lok Sabha constituency), Indian parliament
- Varanasi (Division Graduates Constituency), the state assembly of Uttar Pradesh
- Varanasi (Mayoral Constituency), for mayoral elections of the city

== See also ==
- Banaras (disambiguation)
- Banares (disambiguation)
- Kashi (disambiguation)
- Kasi (disambiguation)
- Kasi Kingdom a kingdom of ancient India, centred on Kasi (Varanasi)
