= Puposyrnola dorothea =

Scientific classification
- Kingdom: Animalia
- Phylum: Mollusca
- Class: Gastropoda
- Family: Pyramidellidae
- Genus: Puposyrnola
- Species: P. dorothea

Binomial name
- Puposyrnola dorothea van Aartsen & Corgan, 1996

Synonyms
- Eulimella parvula Thiele, 1925

Species of gastropod

Puposyrnola dorothea is a species of sea snail, a marine gastropod mollusk in the family Pyramidellidae, the pyrams and their allies.

== Distribution ==
This marine species occurs off South Africa.
