= Banaras (disambiguation) =

Varanasi, also called Banaras and Kashi, is a city in the Indian state of Uttar Pradesh.

Banaras may also refer to:

== Places ==
- Banaras State, former princely state of India
- Banaras Hindu University, university in Varanasi, India
- Banaras Colony, a neighbourhood of SITE Town, Karachi, Pakistan

== Films and television ==
- Banaras (2006 film), an Indian Hindi-language film
- Banaras (2009 film), an Indian Malayalam-language film
- Banaras (2022 film), an Indian Kannada-language film
- Banaras (TV series), an Indian television series

== See also ==
- Banares (disambiguation)
- Banarasi Babu (disambiguation)
- Kashi (disambiguation)
- Bañares, a municipality of La Rioja, Spain
