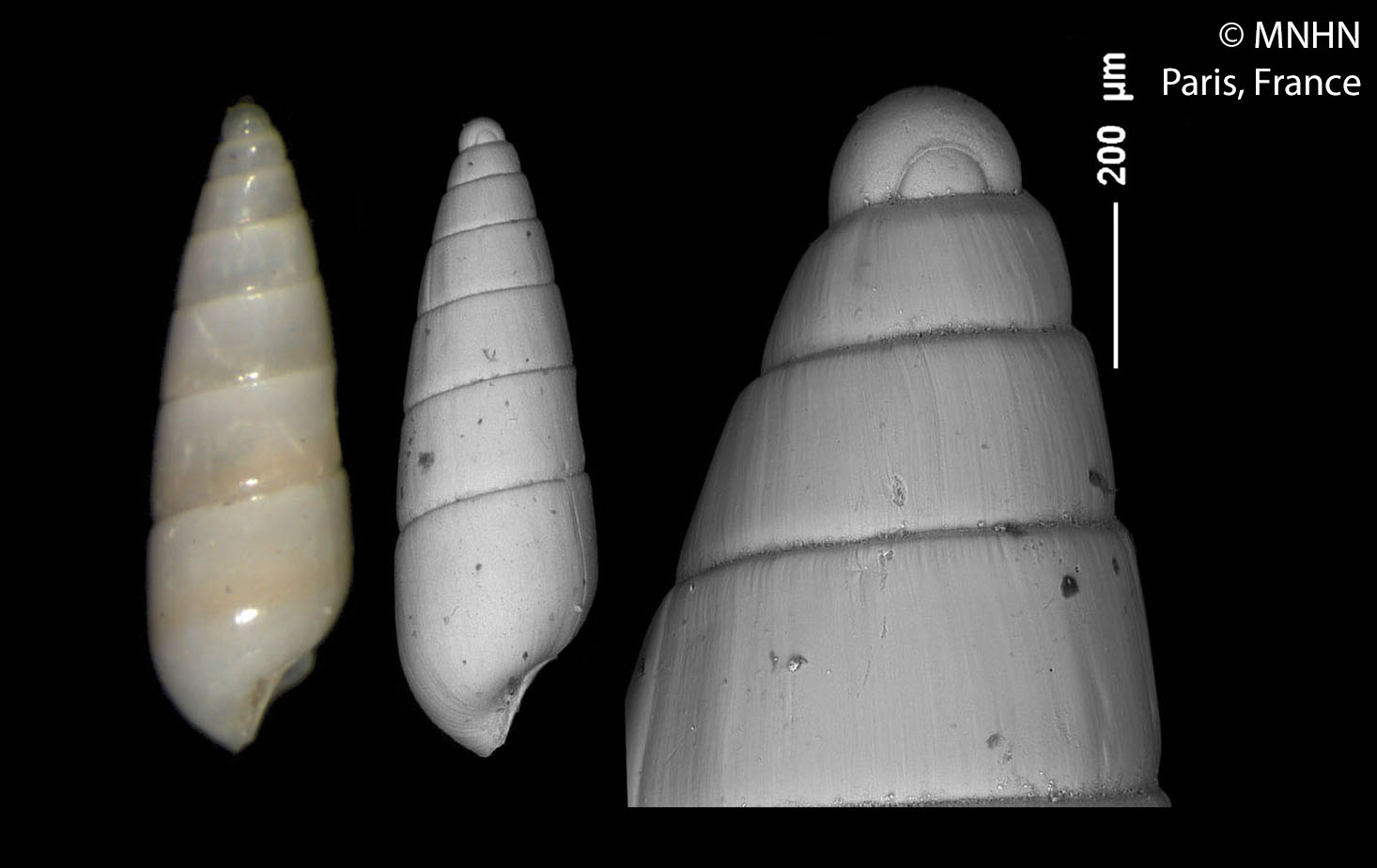
- Shell of Puposyrnola fuscofasciata (paratype at MNHN, Paris)

Scientific classification
- Kingdom: Animalia
- Phylum: Mollusca
- Class: Gastropoda
- Superfamily: Pyramidelloidea
- Family: Pyramidellidae
- Subfamily: Turbonillinae
- Genus: Puposyrnola; Cossmann, 1921

Type species
- Auricula acicula Lamarck, J.B.P.A. de, 1804

= Puposyrnola =

Genus of gastropods

Puposyrnola is a genus of sea snails, marine gastropod mollusks in the subfamily Turbonillinae of the family Pyramidellidae, the pyrams and their allies.

== Description ==
The subcylindrical, milky white shell has a pupoid shape. The columellar tooth is well-developed (but is missing on P. minuta and P. kaasi).

== Species ==
Species within the genus Puposyrnola include:

- Puposyrnola abstrusa Peñas & Rolán, 2016
- † Puposyrnola acicula (Lamarck, 1804)
- Puposyrnola basistriata Robba, Di Geronimo, Chaimanee, Negri & Sanfilippo, 2004
- Puposyrnola bonardi Saurin, 1959
- Puposyrnola callembryon (Dautzenberg & Fischer, 1906)
- Puposyrnola convoluta (Watson, 1886)
- Puposyrnola dorothea van Aartsen & Corgan, 1996
- Puposyrnola eruca Laseron, 1959
- Puposyrnola fastigiata (Suter, 1906)
- Puposyrnola fuscofasciata Peñas & Rolán, 2016
- Puposyrnola harrissoni (Tate & May, 1900)
- Puposyrnola fuscofasciata Peñas & Rolán, 2016
- Puposyrnola intrafuniculata Peñas & Rolán, 2016
- Puposyrnola inturbida (Yokoyama, 1927)
- Puposyrnola kaasi van Aartsen, Gittenberger E. & Goud, 1998
- Puposyrnola micrembryon Saurin, 1959
- Puposyrnola missile Laws, 1937
- Puposyrnola petterdi Gatliff, 1900
- Puposyrnola philippinensis Peñas & Rolán, 2016
- Puposyrnola proletare Laseron, 1951
- † Puposyrnola stirps Laws, 1937
- Puposyrnola tasmanica (Tennison Woods, 1877)
- † Puposyrnola tenuispiralis P. A. Maxwell, 1992
- Puposyrnola terebroides (Kuroda & Kawamoto, 1956)
- Puposyrnola tracta Saurin, 1959
- Puposyrnola vienae Saurin, 1959

The following species were brought into synonymy:

- Puposyrnola minuta (H. Adams, 1869): synonym of Syrnola minuta Adams H., 1869
