= Puposyrnola basistriata =

Scientific classification
- Kingdom: Animalia
- Phylum: Mollusca
- Class: Gastropoda
- Family: Pyramidellidae
- Genus: Puposyrnola
- Species: P. basistriata

Binomial name
- Puposyrnola basistriata Robba, Di Geronimo, Chaimanee, Negri & Sanfilippo, 2004

Species of gastropod

Puposyrnola basistriata is a species of sea snail, a marine gastropod mollusk in the family Pyramidellidae, the pyrams and their allies. Can be found in the Northern part of the Gulf of Thailand.
