= Puposyrnola fastigiata =

Scientific classification
- Kingdom: Animalia
- Phylum: Mollusca
- Class: Gastropoda
- Family: Pyramidellidae
- Genus: Puposyrnola
- Species: P. fastigiata

Binomial name
- Puposyrnola fastigiata (Suter, 1906)

Species of gastropod

Puposyrnola fastigiata is a species of sea snail, a marine gastropod mollusk in the family Pyramidellidae, the pyrams and their allies. Can be found in New Zealand.
