= Puposyrnola missile =

Scientific classification
- Kingdom: Animalia
- Phylum: Mollusca
- Class: Gastropoda
- Family: Pyramidellidae
- Genus: Puposyrnola
- Species: P. missile

Binomial name
- Puposyrnola missile Laws, 1937

Species of gastropod

Puposyrnola missile is a species of sea snail, a marine gastropod mollusk in the family Pyramidellidae, the pyrams and their allies.
