= Kasi =

Kasi or KASI may refer to:

== People ==
- Kasi (Pashtun tribe)
- Kasi Fine (born 1964), Tongan rugby player
- Kasi Lemmons (born 1961), American film director and actress
- Kasi Nayinar Pararacacekaran (died 1570), ruler of the Jaffna kingdom
- Kasi Palaniappan, Malaysian businessman
- Kasi Viswanathan (born 1968), Indian film editor
- Mir Aimal Kansi (also spelled Kasi or Qasi), Pakistani national convicted of the 1993 shootings at CIA Headquarters

== Other uses ==
- Kasi (film), an Indian Tamil-language film
- Kasi Kingdom, a kingdom of ancient India, centred on Kasi (Varanasi)
- KASI, a radio station licensed to serve Ames, Iowa
- Korea Astronomy and Space Science Institute, South Korea
- Muang Kasi, a town in Laos

== See also ==
- Kaasi (disambiguation)
- Kashi (disambiguation)
- Kazi (disambiguation)
- Khasi (disambiguation)
- Ghazi (disambiguation)
- Varanasi (disambiguation)
- Casimir, and variants, a form of the Polish name Kazimierz
- Township (South Africa), which for non-whites were called lokasie or kasie
