= Banares =

Banares may refer to:

- Varanasi (sometimes transliterated: Banares), a city in Uttar Pradesh, India
- Bañares, a municipality in La Rioja, Spain

== See also ==
- Varanasi (disambiguation)
- Banaras (disambiguation)
- Kashi (disambiguation)
