= Banarasi Babu =

Banarasi Babu may refer to:

- Banarasi Babu (1997 film), a 1997 Hindi film directed by David Dhawan
- Banarasi Babu (1973 film), a 1973 Hindi film directed by Shankar Mukherjee
