= K. N. Pandita =

Indian historian

K. N. Pandita, also known as Kashi Nath Pandita (born 1929), is an Indian Kashmiri scholar in Persian and Central Asian Studies.

== Early life and education ==
Born in Jammu & Kashmir, Pandita studied and worked at Panjab University and University of Tehran, taught at the University of Kashmir and was the former professor and director at the Center of Central Asian Studies at the University of Kashmir. He was awarded UGC Emeritus Fellowship in Central Asian Studies 1978–88, and was awarded by the President and Vice President of India in 1985 and 1987 (respectively) for his academic attainments.

== Awards ==
He is a recipient of the Padma Shri in literature and education in 2017.

== Works ==
- Pandit, K. N. (2013). Baharistan-i-shahi: A chronicle of mediaeval Kashmir. Akshaya Prakashan, 208 M.G. House,2 Community Centre, Wazirpur Industrial Area, New Delhi - 110052 (Translation)
- Pandit, K. N. (2009). A Muslim missionary in mediaeval Kashmir: Being the English translation of Tohfatu'l-ahbab. New Delhi: Voice of India. (Translation)
- Pandit, K.N. (2017) [Ten Studies in the History and Politics of Kashmir] Published by ICSSR, Aruna Asaf Ali Marg, New Delhi - 110067
- Pandit K.N. and Budgami P L Kaul [Kashmiri Pandits through fire and brimstone] 2022, Akshay Prakashan, 2 Community Centre, Wazirpur Industrial Area, New Delhi - 110052
