= Puposyrnola kaasi =

Scientific classification
- Kingdom: Animalia
- Phylum: Mollusca
- Class: Gastropoda
- Family: Pyramidellidae
- Genus: Puposyrnola
- Species: P. kaasi

Binomial name
- Puposyrnola kaasi van Aartsen, Gittenberger E. & Goud, 1998

Species of gastropod

Puposyrnola kaasi is a species of sea snail, a marine gastropod mollusk in the family Pyramidellidae, the pyrams and their allies.

== Description ==
The subcylindrical, milky-white shell has a pupoidal apex. The length of the shell measures 4.4 mm. The six to seven whorls of the teleoconch are slightly concave. They are marked by an incised suture. The sculpture shows prosocline (i.e. they lean forward (adapically) with respect to the direction of the shell) growth lines and microscopic striae. The outer lip is straight. There is no umbilicus, columellar tooth or fold.

== Distribution ==
This species occurs in the Atlantic Ocean off the Cape Verdes at depths between 270 m and 354 m.
