= Kashi, Hormozgan =

Kashi کاشی
- Village
- Location within Iran
- Coordinates: 25°40′39″N 59°08′20″E
- Country: Iran
- Province: Hormozgan
- County: Jask
- Bakhsh: Lirdaf
- Rural District: Piveshk

Population (2006)
  - Total: 557
- Time zone: UTC+3:30 (IRST)
  - Summer (DST): UTC+4:30 (IRDT)

Kashi (Persian: کاشی, also Romanized as Kāshī) is a village in Piveshk Rural District, Lirdaf District, Jask County, Hormozgan Province, Iran. At the 2006 census, its population was 557, in 134 families.
