= Tohfatu'l-Ahbab =

17th century travelogue of Kashmir

Tohfatu'l-Ahbab is a Persian work by Muhammad Ali Kashmiri, presumably written in 1642. It is the biography of Shamsu'd-Din Muhammad Araki, a Shi'a Muslim missionary who visited Kashmir, Gilgit and Baltistan in the 15th and 16th centuries. Araki was the founder of the Nurbakhshiyyeh Sufi order in Kashmir. The work was translated into English by Kashi Nath Pandit.

== See also ==
- Baharistan-i-shahi
