= Kashipur Assembly constituency =

Kashipur Assembly constituency may refer to

- Kashipur, West Bengal Assembly constituency
- Cossipur Assembly constituency, West Bengal
- Kashipur, Uttarakhand Assembly constituency
- Kashipur-Belgachhia Assembly constituency
