= Kashipur, Raebareli =

Kashipur Kāshipur
- Village
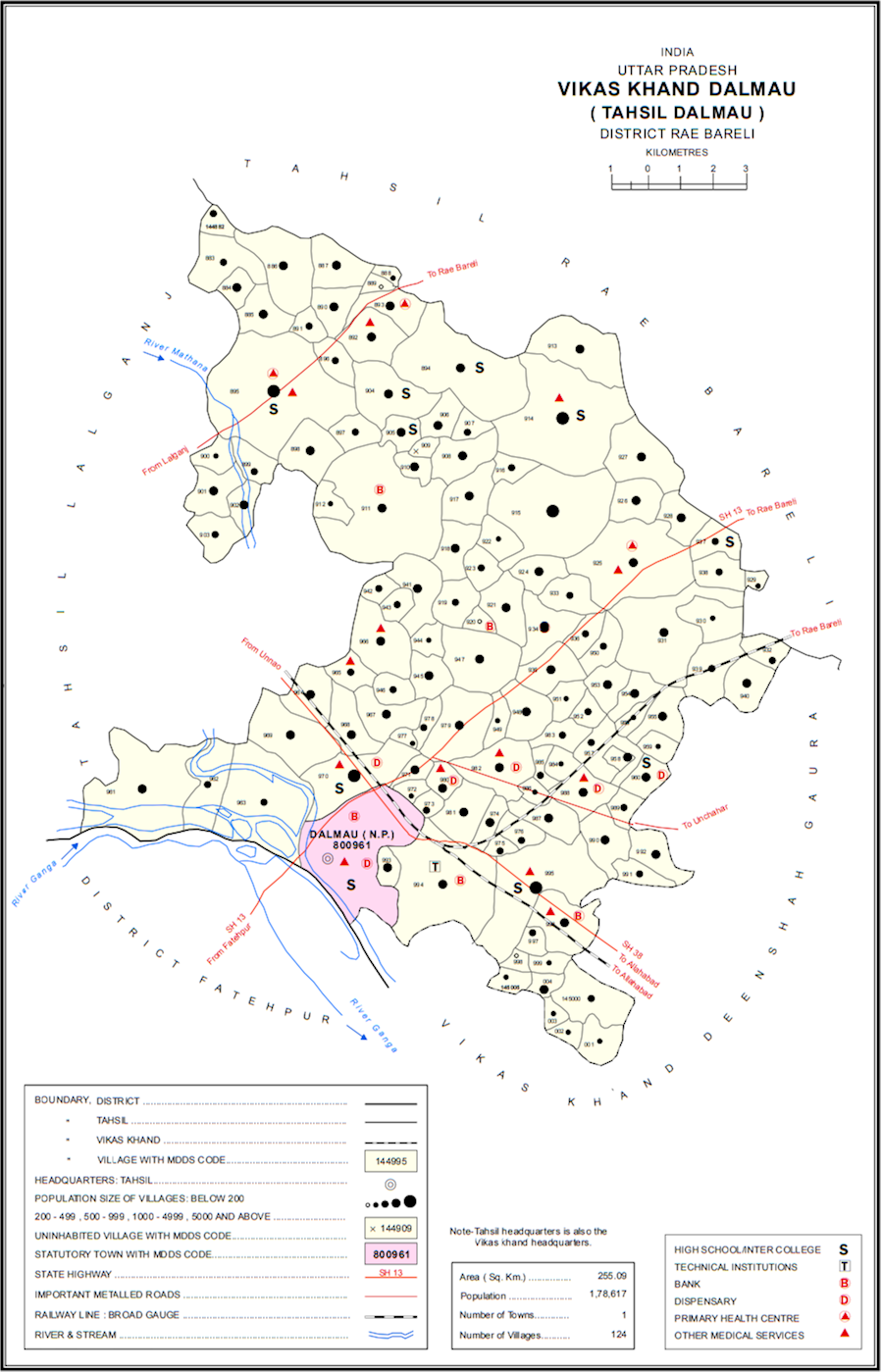
- Map showing Kashipur (#943) in Dalmau CD block

- Location in Uttar Pradesh, India
- Coordinates: 26.131454°N 81.060163°E
- Country India: India
- State: Uttar Pradesh
- District: Raebareli

Area
  - Total: 0.759 km^{2} (0.293 sq mi)

Population (2011)
  - Total: 618
  - Density: 814/km^{2} (2,110/sq mi)

Languages
  - Official: Hindi
- Time zone: UTC+5:30 (IST)
- Vehicle registration: UP-35

Kashipur is a village in Dalmau block of Rae Bareli district, Uttar Pradesh, India. It is located 9 km from Dalmau, the block headquarters. As of 2011, it has a population of 618 people, in 102 households. It has no schools and no healthcare facilities.

The 1961 census recorded Kashipur as comprising 1 hamlet, with a total population of 225 people (109 male and 116 female), in 36 households and 35 physical houses. The area of the village was given as 197 acres.

The 1981 census recorded Kashipur as having a population of 306 people, in 56 households, and having an area of 75.68 hectares. The main staple foods were listed as wheat and rice.
