= Baharistan-i-shahi =

17th century history book of Kashmir

Baharistan-i-shahi (Nastaliq:بہارستان شاہی), meaning Spring Garden of Royalty, is a chronicle of medieval Kashmir. The Persian manuscript was written by an anonymous author, presumably in 1614.

It details the political and social history of Kashmir, particularly focusing on the Sultanate period of Kashmir and Mughal rule.

The work was translated into English by Kashinath Pandit, a former director at the Center of Central Asian Studies at the University of Kashmir.

== See also ==
- Tohfatu'l-Ahbab
