= Kasi Palaniappan =

Malaysian executive and former architect

Datuk Kasi K.L. Palaniappan is a prominent Malaysian businessman.

Born in 1958, he is a former architect and university professor. He founded MK Land with Mustapha Kamal Abu Bakar. He took over as managing director and acting chief executive in April 2006; share prices of the company subsequently doubled. In 2017 he was ousted from MK Land.

In 2007 Forbes Asia ranked him 40th on their list of 40 Richest Malaysians, with a personal wealth of US$127 million.
