= Srinagar =

City in Indian-administered Jammu and Kashmir

- City administered by India
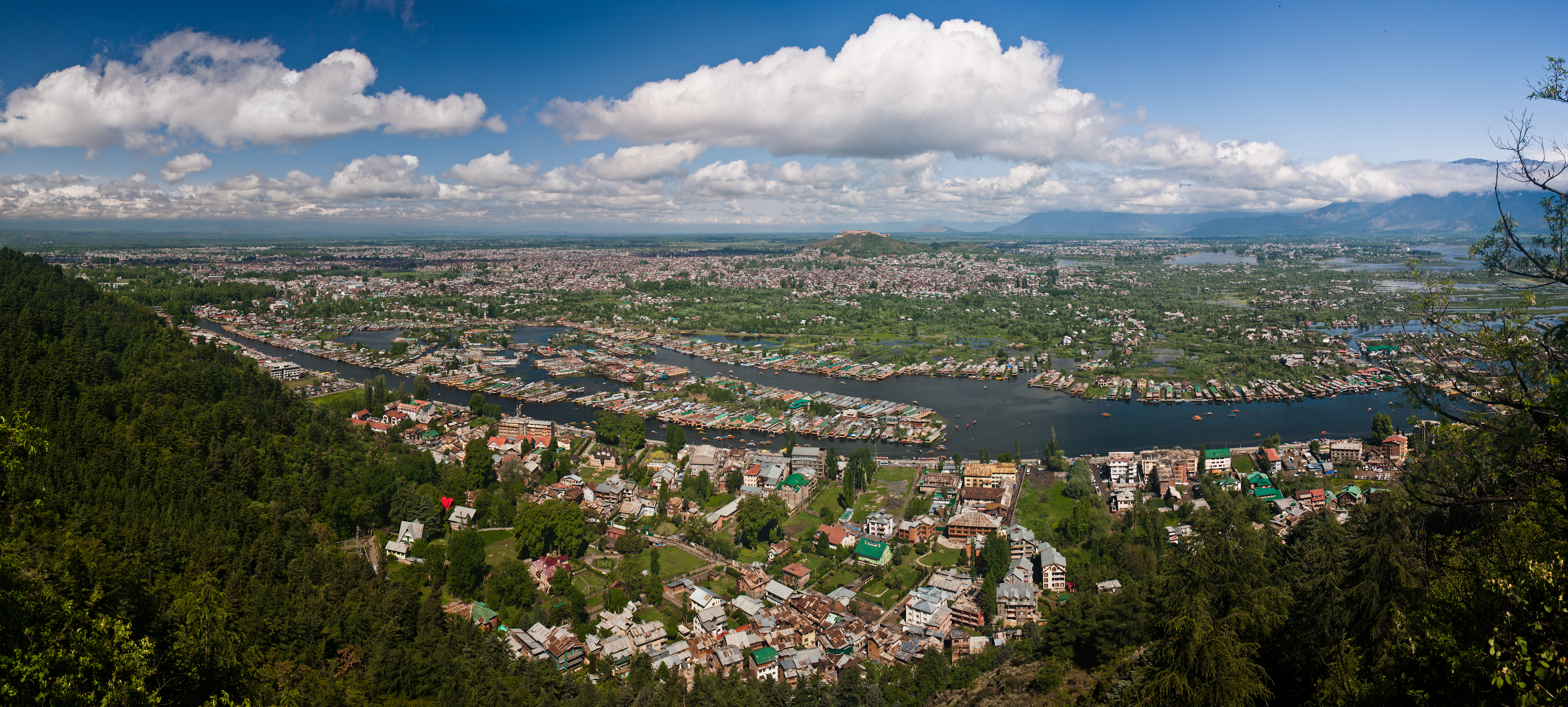
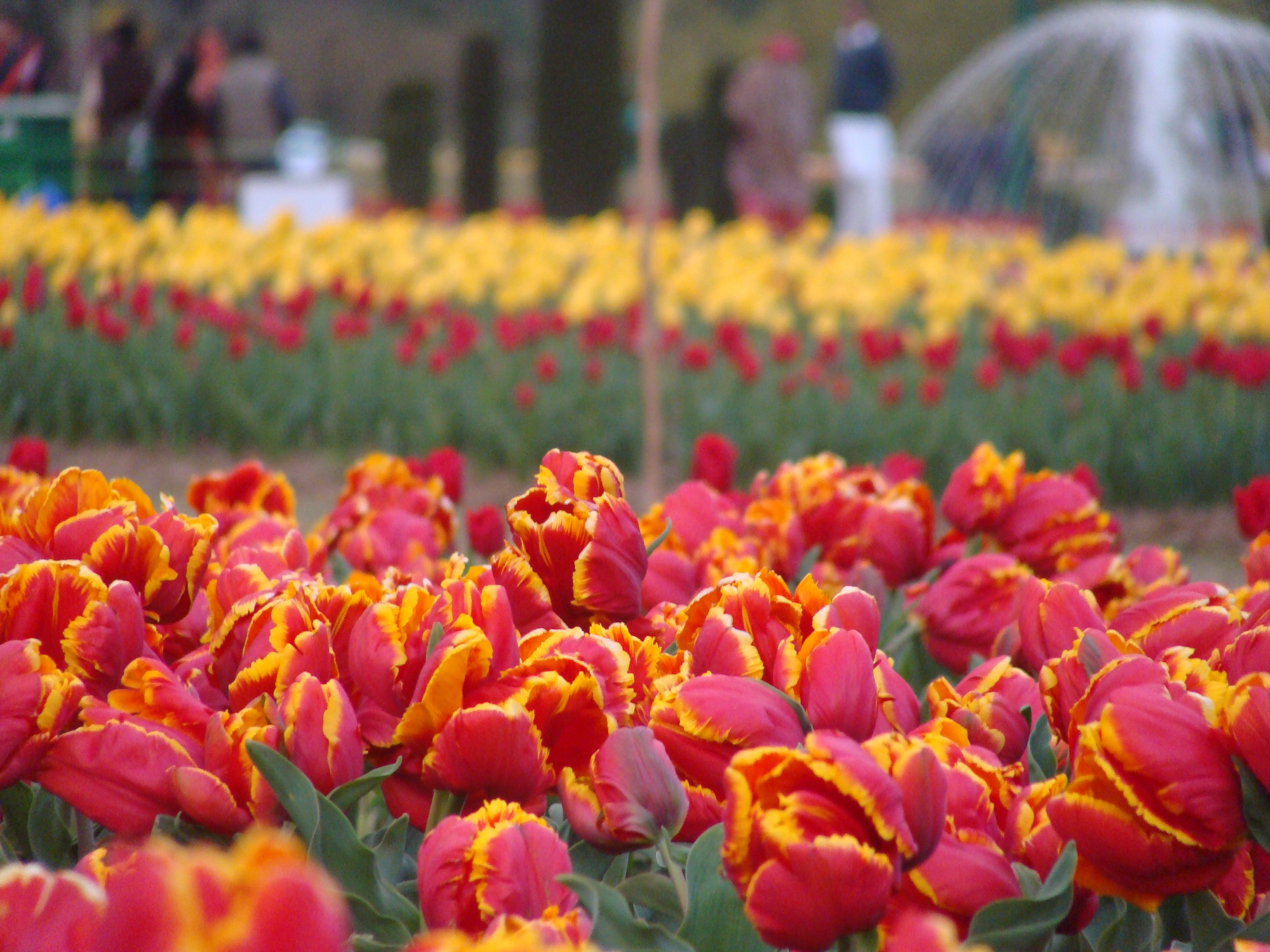
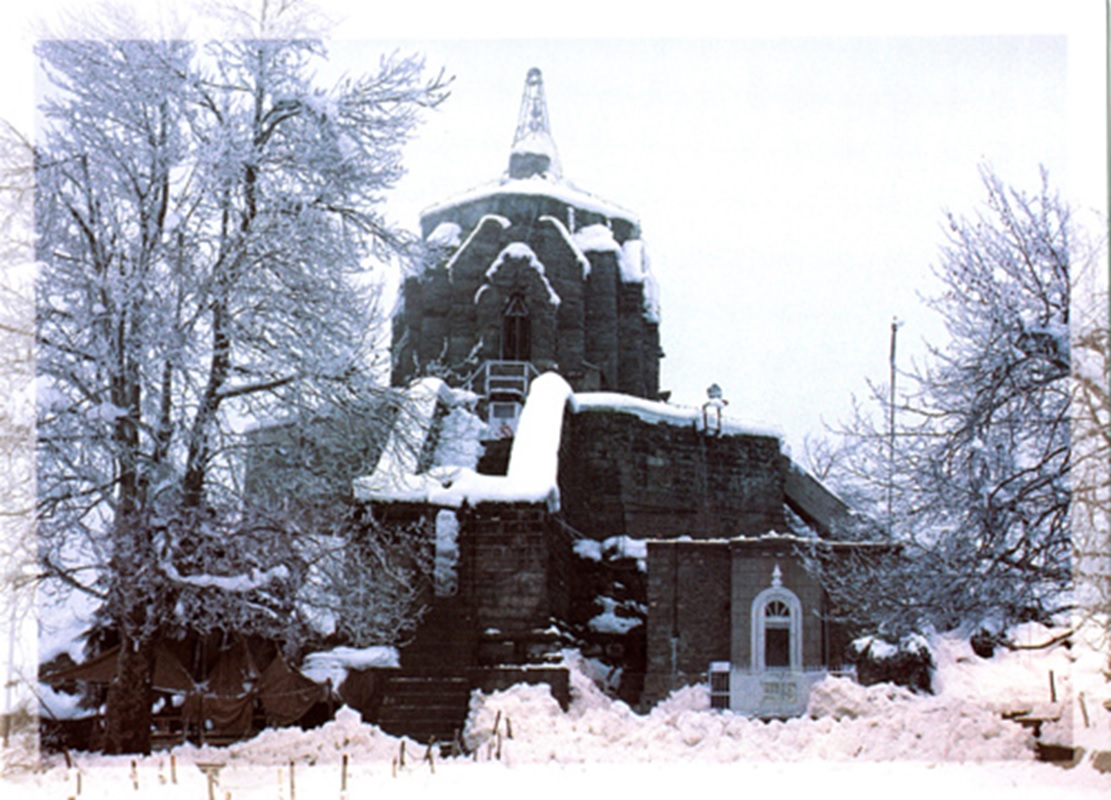
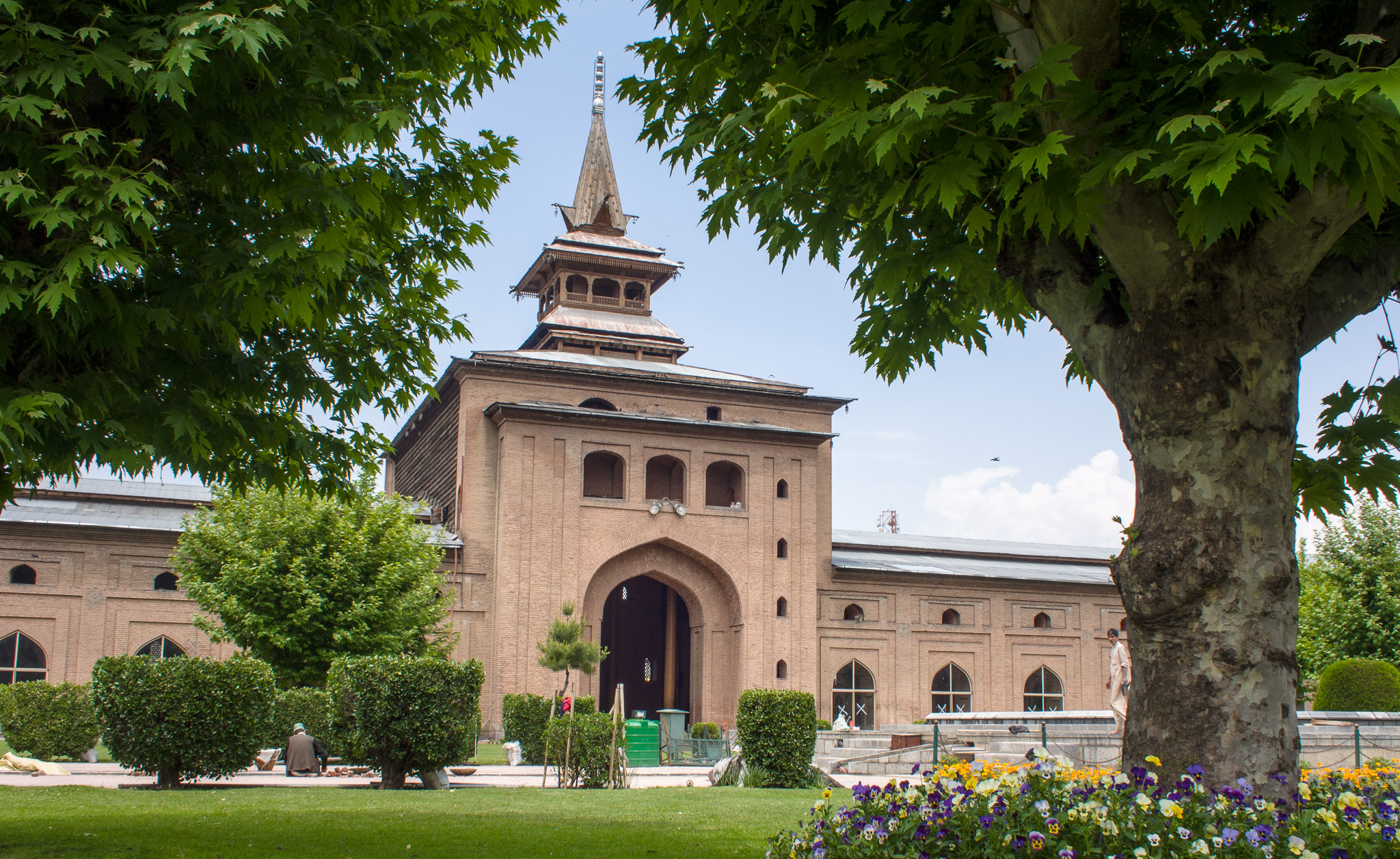
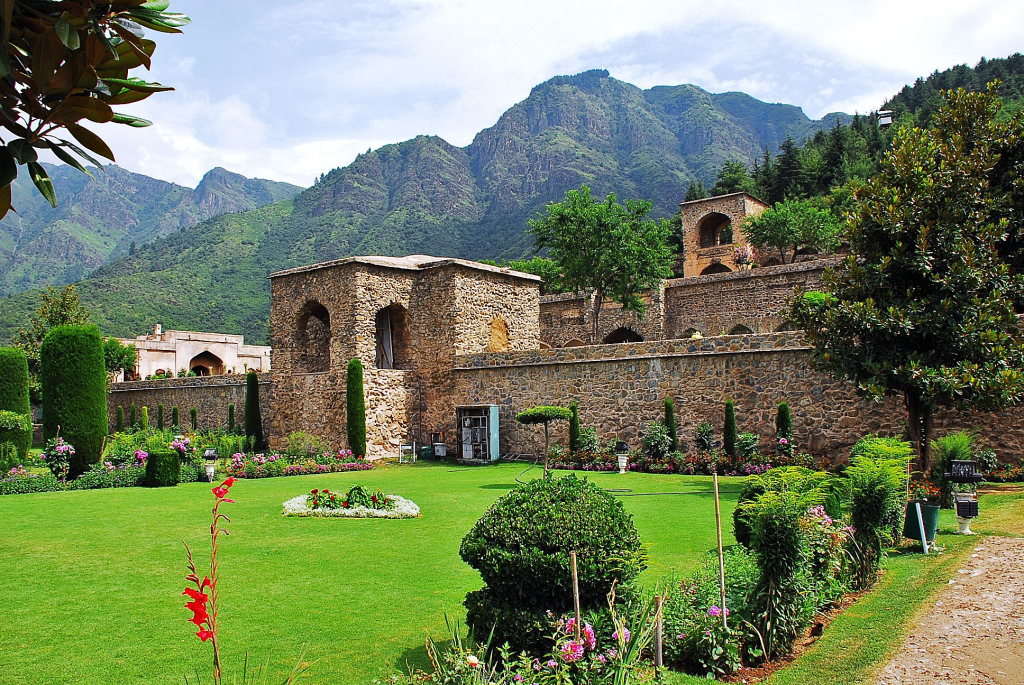
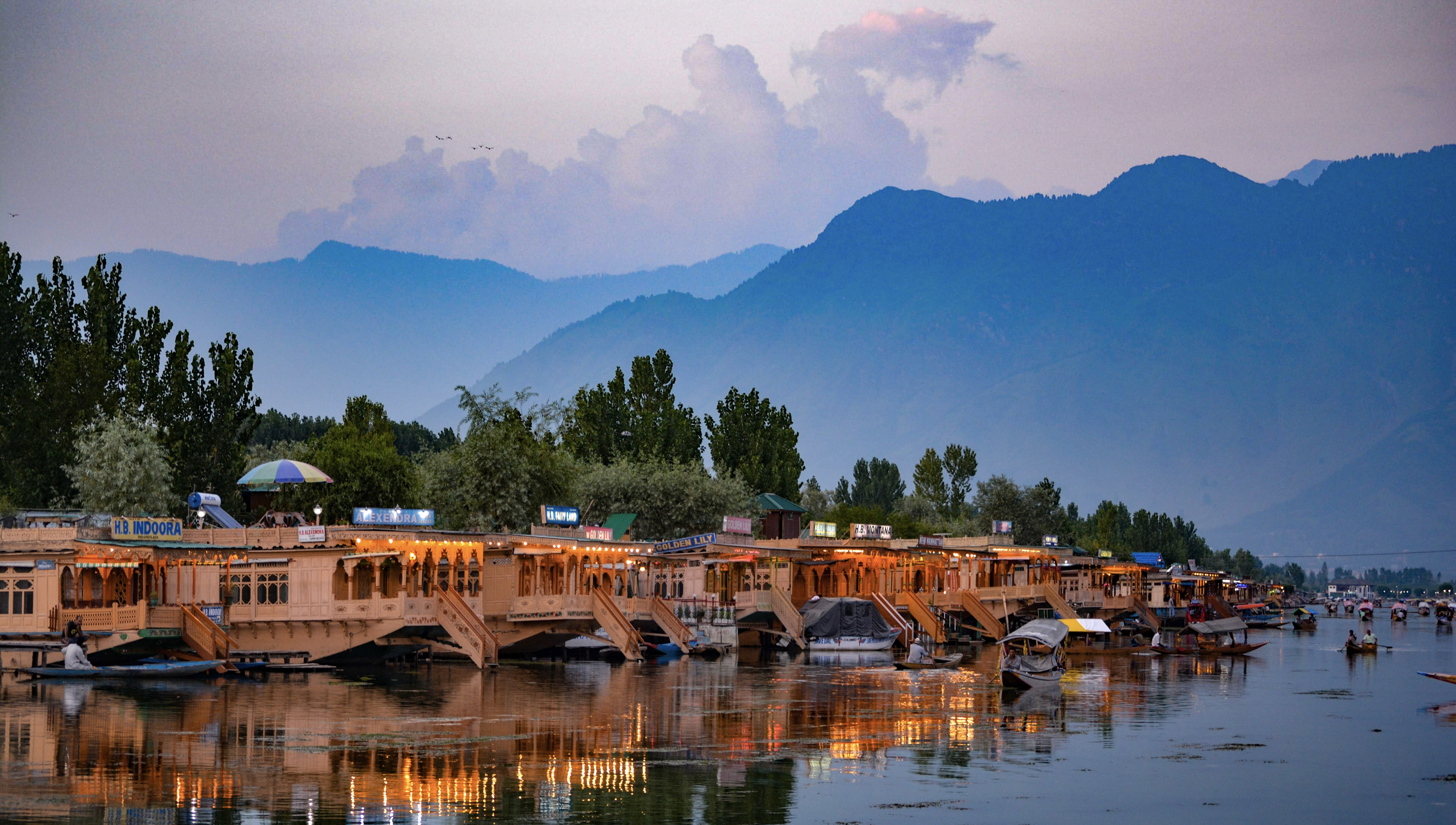
- Aerial view of Srinagar Indira Gandhi Memorial Tulip Garden Shankaracharya Temple Jamia Mosque Pari Mahal Houseboats on Dal Lake

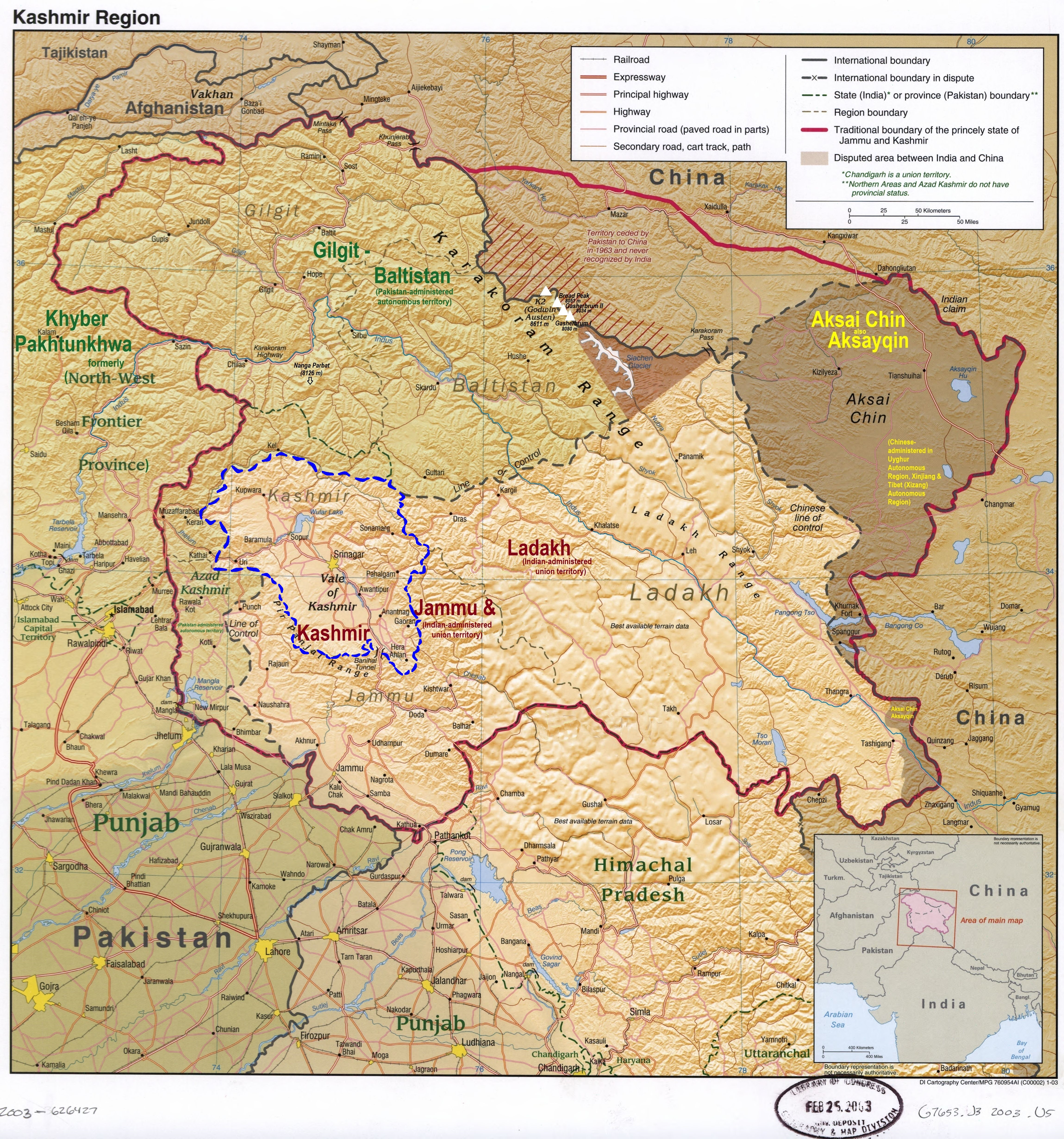
- Srinagar lies in the Kashmir division (neon blue) of the Indian-administered Jammu and Kashmir (shaded tan) in the disputed Kashmir region. =
- Interactive map of Srinagar
- Coordinates: 34°5′24″N 74°47′24″E
- Administering country: India
- Region of administration: Union Territory of Jammu and Kashmir
- Division: Kashmir
- District: Srinagar
- Named for: Lakshmi

Government
  - Type: Municipal corporation
  - Body: Srinagar Municipal Corporation
  - Mayor: Vacant
  - Municipal Commissioner: Owais Ahmed Rana, IAS

Area
  - City administered by India: 294 km^{2} (114 sq mi)
  - Metro: 766 km^{2} (296 sq mi)
- Elevation: 1,585 m (5,200 ft)

Population (2011)
  - City administered by India: 1,180,570
  - Rank: 31st
  - Density: 4,020/km^{2} (10,400/sq mi)
  - Metro: 1,273,312
  - Metro Rank: 37th
- Demonym(s): Srinagari, Sirinagari, Sirinagaruk, Shaharuk, Srinagarite

Languages
  - Official: Kashmiri, Urdu, Hindi, Dogri, English
- Time zone: UTC+5:30 (IST)
- PIN: 190001-190020
- Telephone code: 0194
- Vehicle registration: JK 01
- Sex ratio: 888 ♀/ 1000 ♂
- Literacy: 69.15%
- Distance from Delhi: 876 kilometres (544 mi) NW
- Distance from Mumbai: 2,275 kilometres (1,414 mi) NE (land)
- Climate: Cfa
- Precipitation: 710 millimetres (28 in)
- Avg. summer temperature: 23.3 °C (73.9 °F)
- Avg. winter temperature: 3.2 °C (37.8 °F)
- Website: www.smcsite.org

Srinagar (Note: /ˈsriːnəɡər/; Kashmiri: [siriːnagar], lit. 'city of Shri') is a city in Indian-administered Jammu and Kashmir in the disputed Kashmir region. It is the largest city and summer capital of Jammu and Kashmir, which is an Indian-administered union territory. It lies in the Kashmir Valley along the banks of the Jhelum River, and the shores of Dal Lake and Anchar Lakes, between the Hari Parbat and Shankaracharya hills. The city is known for its natural environment, various gardens, waterfronts and houseboats. It is also known for traditional Kashmiri handicrafts like the Kashmir shawl (made of pashmina and cashmere wool), papier-mâché, wood carving, carpet weaving, and jewel making, as well as for dried fruits. It is the second-largest metropolitan area in the Himalayas (after Kathmandu, the capital of Nepal).

Founded in the 6th century during the rule of the Gonanda dynasty according to the Rajatarangini, the city took on the name of an earlier capital thought to have been founded by the Mauryas in its vicinity. The city remained the most important capital of the Kashmir Valley under the Hindu dynasties, and was a major centre of learning. During the 14th–16th centuries the city's old town saw major expansions, particularly under the Shah Mir dynasty, whose kings used various parts of it as their capitals. It became the spiritual centre of Kashmir, and attracted several Sufi preachers. It also started to emerge as a hub of shawl weaving and other Kashmiri handicrafts. In the late 16th century, the city became part of the Mughal Empire, many of whose emperors used it as their summer resort. Many Mughal gardens were built in the city and around Dal lake during this time, of which Shalimar and Nishat are the most well-known.

After passing through the hands of the Afghan Durranis and the Sikhs in the late 18th and early 19th century, it eventually became the summer capital of the Dogra kingdom of Jammu and Kashmir in 1846. The city became a popular tourist destination among Europeans and Indian elites during this time, with several hotels and its iconic houseboats being built. In 1952, the city became the summer capital of Jammu and Kashmir, a region administered by India as a state, with Jammu being its winter capital. It was the flashpoint of violence during the 1990s and early 2000s insurgency in the region. In 2019, it became the summer capital of a smaller region which is administered by India as a union territory, after the former state's reorganisation.

== Etymology ==
The earliest record of the name comes from Kalhana's Sanskrit chronicle Rajatarangini, which mentions the name Śrīnagarī, from shrī, an appellation for Lakshmi, the Hindu goddess of wealth, prosperity, beauty and fortune, and nagarī meaning city. The name Srinagar derives from Śrīnagarī, meaning 'City of Lakshmi'. (Note: An unrealistic and incorrect etymology for the city’s name was invented by English traveller Godfrey Vigne, who visited Kashmir in the 1830s, and erroneously suggested in his 1842 travelogue that the city’s name derived from surya, or the sun. This incorrect etymology was reproduced by other 19th century writers and was popular with European visitors, but has been rejected by scholars and historians.) The name was used for an older capital in the vicinity of the present-day city, before being used for it. Between the 14th and 19th centuries, and especially during 17th–18th century, the city was also referred to simply as Kashmir or Shahr-i-Kashmir (lit. 'City of Kashmir') in addition to Srinagar.

== History ==
=== Early history ===
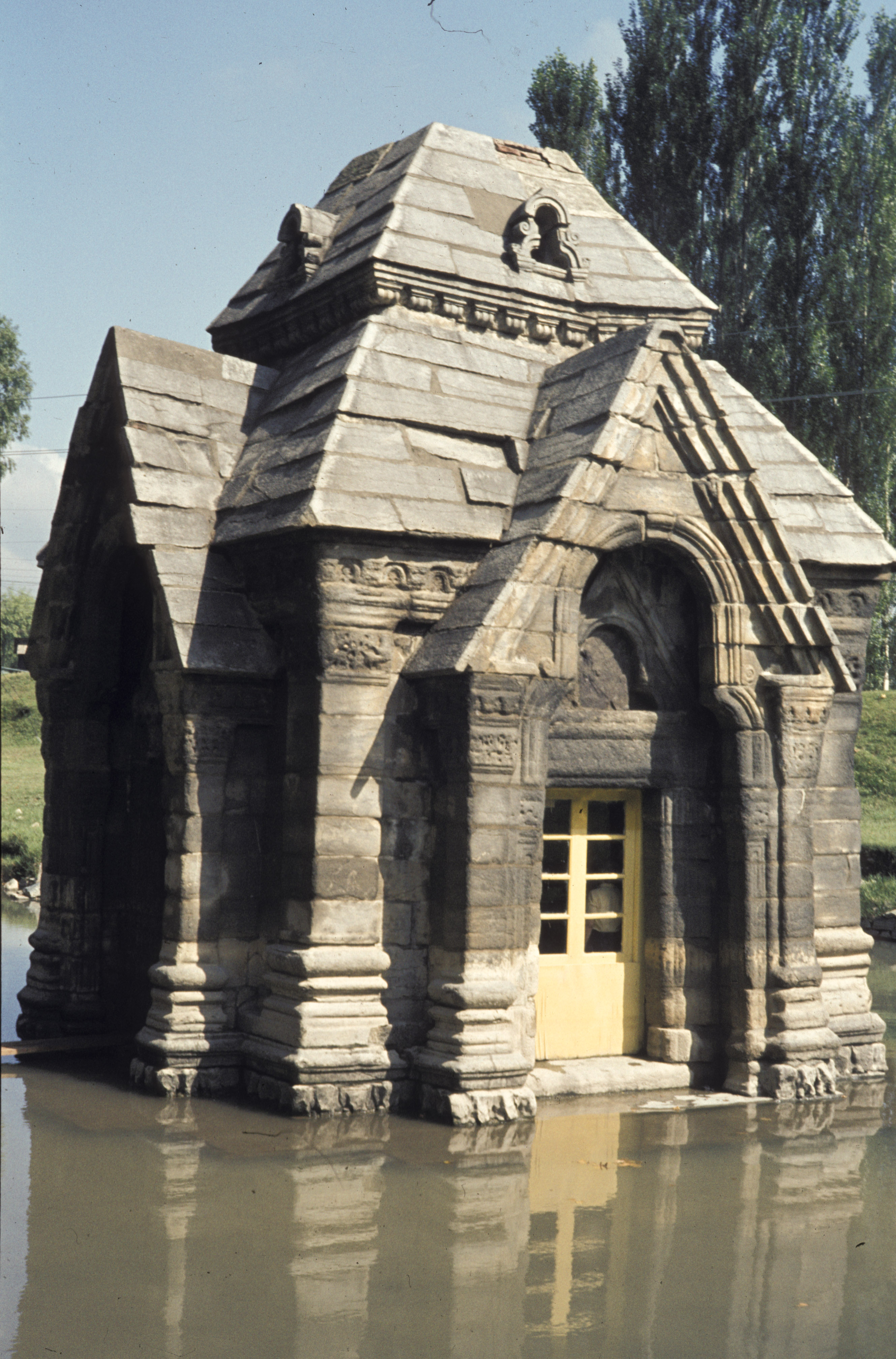
Shiva Temple at Pandrethan, near Srinagar, built c. 8th–9th century CE

According to the Rajatarangini of Kalhana, a capital city by the name of Srinagari was built in the Kashmir valley by Ashoka, identified by historians with the Mauryan emperor Ashoka. (Note: Historians Muhammad Wani and Aman Wani say that the foundation of this city was part of the wider second urbanisation in India during NBPW culture, and suggest that it was a result of economic growth in Kashmir during Mauryan rule.) Kalhana calls this capital puranadhisthana, Sanskrit for 'old capital', identified as present-day Pandrethan, 3.5 kilometres south-east of Srinagar. A 'new capital' called Parvarapura was built by king Pravarasena of the Gonanda dynasty, in 6th century CE. Srinagari continued to be used as a name for this capital. This new capital was located at the base of the Hari Parbat hill on the right bank of the Jhelum, corresponding to the location of modern-day Srinagar. Kalhana describes the capital having several markets, mansions, wooden houses, grand temples and canals, and also refers to the Dal lake and Jhelum river. Pravarasena built several Vishnu temples in Pravarapura (present-day Srinagar). A long embankment was also constructed on the Jhelum by Pravarasena to protect the city from floods, parts of which have survived to the present day. The two capitals are also mentioned in the chronicle of Chinese traveller Huein Tsang who visited the city in 631 CE and stayed at a vihara built by Pravarasena’s uncle in Srinagar. Several shaiva, vaishnava and bauddha temples were built in and around Srinagar by later Gonanda rulers.

Although several other capitals of Kashmir were constructed by other rulers over the next few centuries, Pravarasena's Srinagar survived as the primary capital. (Note: Historian Mohammad Ishaq Khan states that this is due Srinagar's central location within the valley and the larger neighbourhood, and due to the presence of various water bodies around the city which provided protection.) The city was divided into several parts, each with its own guardian deity, which continue to be worshipped by Hindu Kashmiris. Durlabhavardhana (625–662), founder of the Karkota dynasty, built a temple in Srinagar to celebrate his imperial campaigns in the regions neighbouring Kashmir. The 8th century scholar Adi Shankara visited the city and founded the Shankaracharya Temple here, at the site of the earlier Jyeshteshwara Temple. Kings of principalities neighbouring Kashmir visited Srinagar in the late 11th century to pay homage to king Kalasha of the Lohara dynasty. The city gradually extended to the left bank of the Jhelum river, and in the early 12th century the royal palace was shifted to this side. During later Lohara rule, some Muslims began settling in Srinagar.

=== Sultanate period ===
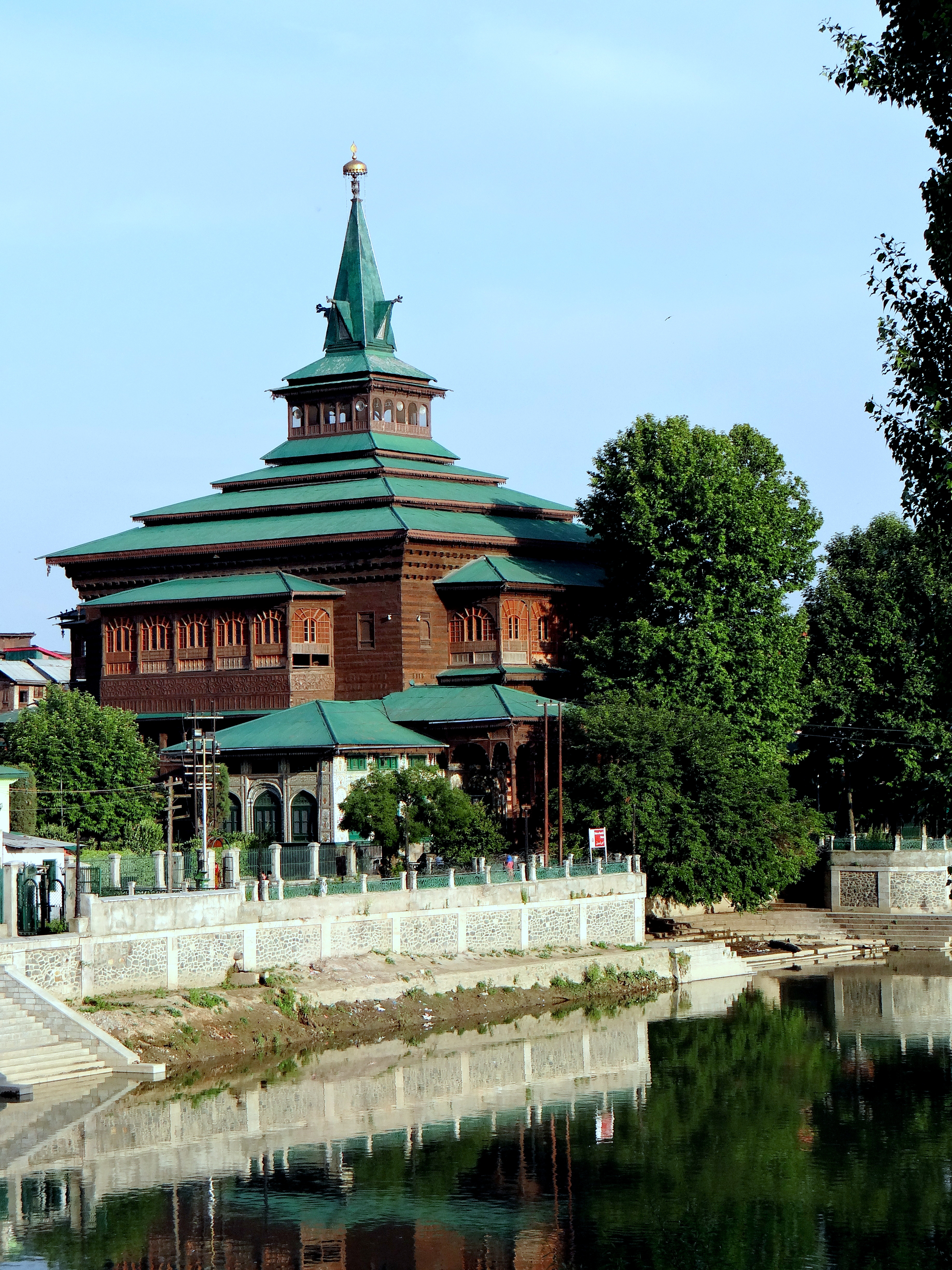
Khanqah-e-Moula, originally built in the late 14th century, and later rebuilt after being destroyed in fires in the 15th and 18th centuries

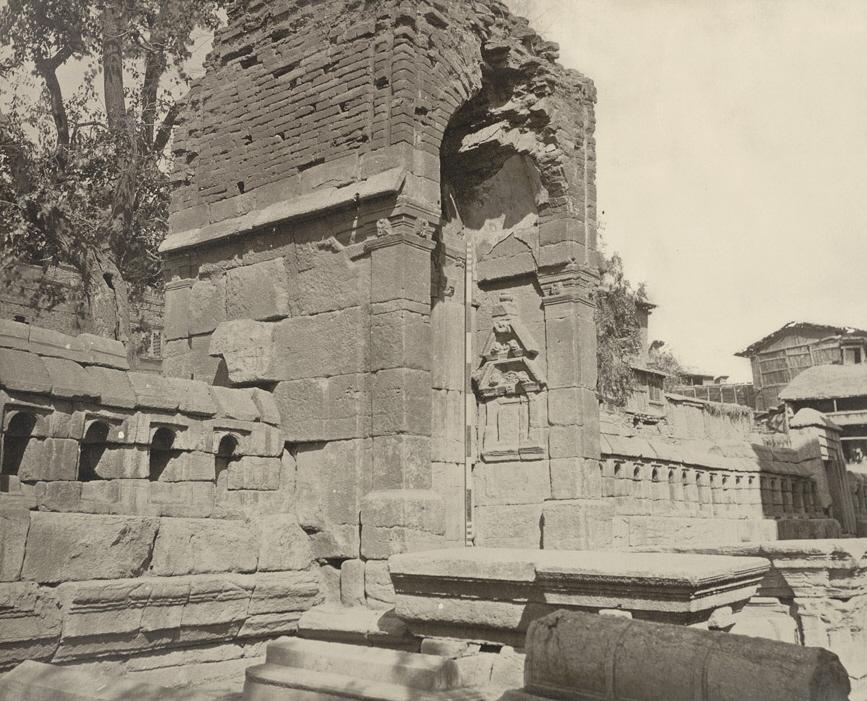
19th century photograph of the enclosure of the tomb of Zain-ul-Abidin's mother, showing remnants of an earlier Hindu stone temple used in its construction

Rinchana, a Buddhist convert to Islam who briefly ruled Kashmir in the early 14th century, built the first mosque in Kashmir on the site of a Buddhist temple in a colony of Srinagar built by him. The Muslim rulers that came after him established their capitals in areas of present-day old city Srinagar. During the rule of the Sultans, the city became synonymous with the Kashmir valley, and 'Srinagar' fell into disuse as a name for it. (Note: The name, however, did not become obsolete and finds mention in several contemporary sources.) During the rule of Qutbuddin, Persian Islamic preacher Mir Sayyid Ali Hamadani briefly visited the valley and stayed at a sarai in Srinagar, close to which a sufa (platform for prayer) was built sometime later. Sayyids, who accompanied Hamadani and his son Mir Muhammad, established khanaqahs, propagated Islam, and desecrated some Hindu temples in Srinagar, forcibly converting some into Muslim shrines, including the oldest surviving example of such conversion in Kashmir. Sultan Sikandar Shahmiri (1389–1413 CE) built the Khanqah-e-Moula in 1397 in Hamadani's memory for Mir Muhammad, either at the site of the sufa or over a temple of Kali called Kaleshwar apparently destroyed by Hamadani during his stay, and endowed it with the revenue of three villages for its maintenance. He also built the Jamia Mosque at Nowhatta in 1402, marking the first successful monumental construction during the sultanate period, built in the Iranian four-iwan plan using deodar wood abundant in the region and adapting local designs found in Hindu stone temples.

Sikandar's successor Zain-ul-Abidin undertook several constructions in and around Srinagar. He built the Zainakadal bridge connecting the two halves of the city on either side of the Jhelum river, the Mar canal and two islands inside Dal lake called Sona Lank and Rupa Lank. He also built a stone mosque complex for his Islamic teacher at Madin Sahib using remnants of a nearby defunct Hindu temple and incorporating local non-Muslim architectural features, and a brick mausoleum with Timurid architectural influences for his mother constructed using materials from a Hindu structure, where he was also buried after his death. He is also credited with establishing industries around the arts of shawl and carpet weaving, papier-maché, and wood carving in Srinagar. The Khanqah-i-Moula was rebuilt during Zain-ul-Abidin's reign and subsequently greatly expanded during the late 15th century by other sultans. By early 16th century, Srinagar had khanaqahs belonging to most major Persianate Sufi orders of the time.

=== Mughal rule ===
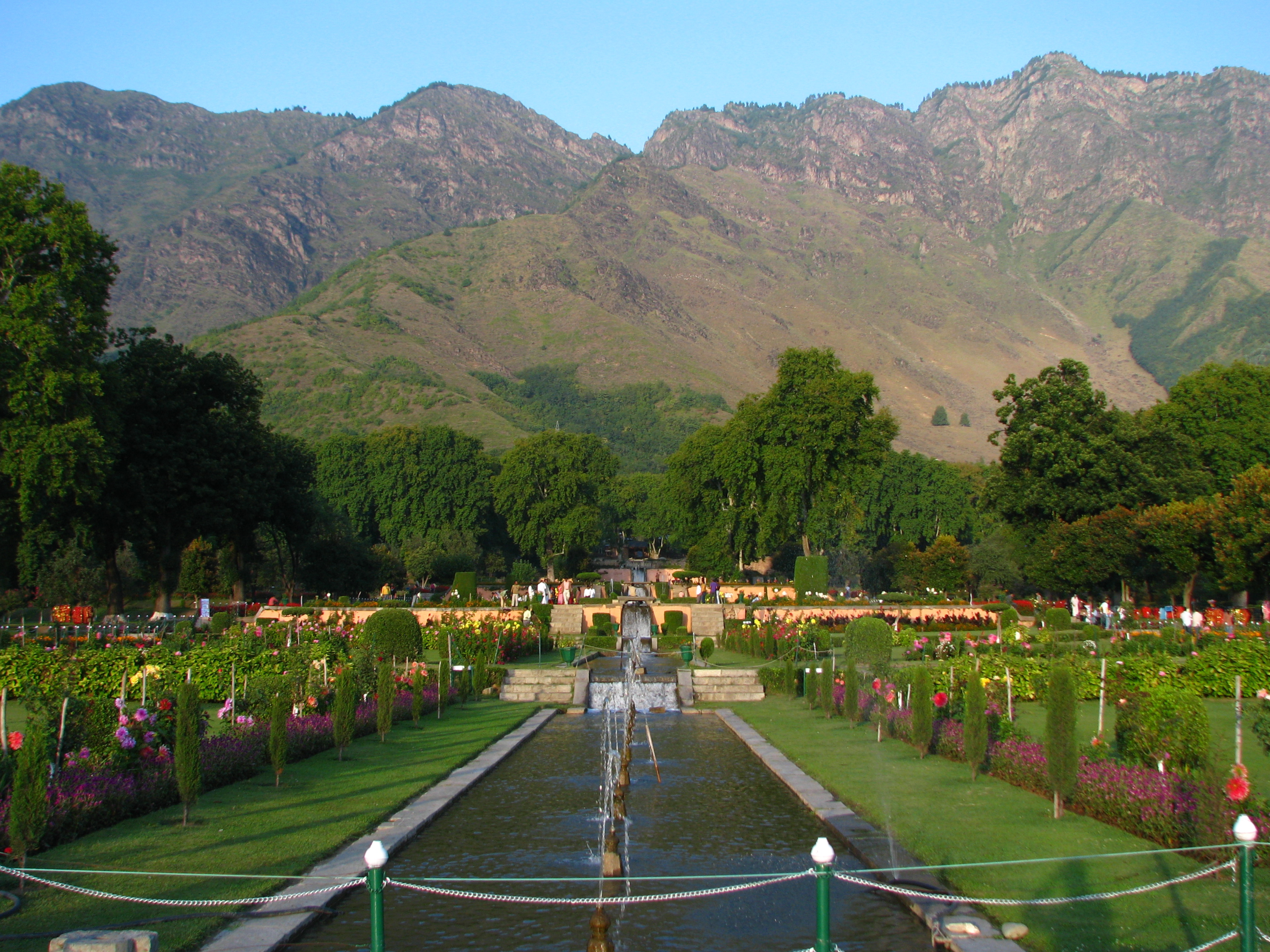
Nishat Bagh, a Mughal Garden built during the reign of Shah Jahan on the northern bank of the Dal lake, in the vicinity of Srinagar

The Mughals annexed Kashmir in 1586 after a period of internal instability in the valley, and added it to their Kabul province. Mughal emperor Akbar visited the valley three times. During his second visit in 1592, an elaborate Diwali celebration was held in Srinagar. On the final such visit, he was accompanied by the first recorded European visitors to the area. (Note: These were Jesuit priests Jerome Xavier and Bento de Góis.) Akbar built fortifications around the Hari Parbat hill, and established a township called Nagar Nagar there. He also built a shrine for Hamza Makhdoom, a Sufi mystic of Kashmir's Rishi order, on the southern slope of Hari Parbat which was later expanded several times. His successor Jahangir was particularly fond of the Kashmir valley and frequently visited it. His rule brought prosperity to Srinagar, and several Mughal gardens were built in the city and around the Dal lake during his and his successor Shah Jahan's reign, including the Shalimar and Nishat Bagh. Empress Nur Jahan built the Pathar Mosque on the left bank of Jhelum river opposite the Khānqāh-e-Moula in 1623, the mosque was however deemed unfit for worship soon after its construction and used instead for non-religious purposes.

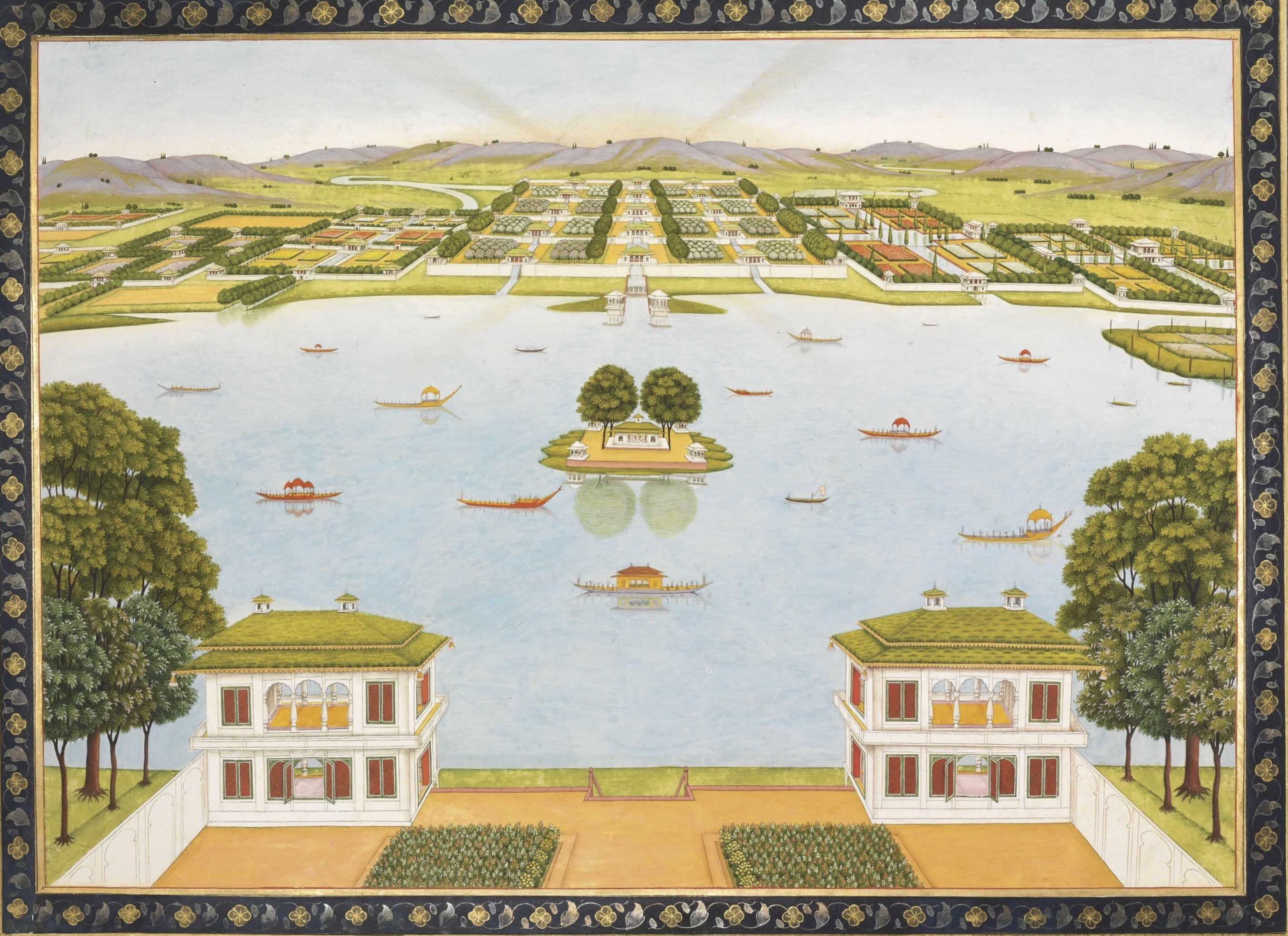
A c. 1780 CE painting depicting the Dal Lake and Shalimar Bagh from Hazratbal

Shah Jahan made Kashmir into a separate Subah (province) in 1638 with its administrative seat at Srinagar, which was designated a pargana. His heir apparent prince Dara Shikoh visited the Kashmir valley frequently, and built the Pari Mahal—a palace, pleasure garden and centre for intellectual discourse and astronomy on the site of a ruined Buddhist monastery—and a stone mosque for his spiritual master Mullah Shah, whom he had met during his first visit to Kashmir in 1640. Aurangzeb (1658–1707) did not share the fondness for Kashmir of his predecessors, and visited the valley only once during his reign. The Aali Masjid was expanded and the Safa kadal bridge was built over the Jhelum river during his reign. The moi muqaddas, a relic believed to be a hair strand from the beard of the Islamic prophet Muhammad, also arrived in Kashmir during this time, and was housed in a Mughal palace at Hazratbal, which became the Hazratbal Dargah. A number of Europeans visited the city during the later Mughal period. (Note: These include physician Francois Bernier and priests Ippolito Desideri and Manoel Freyre.)

=== Afghan and Sikh rule ===
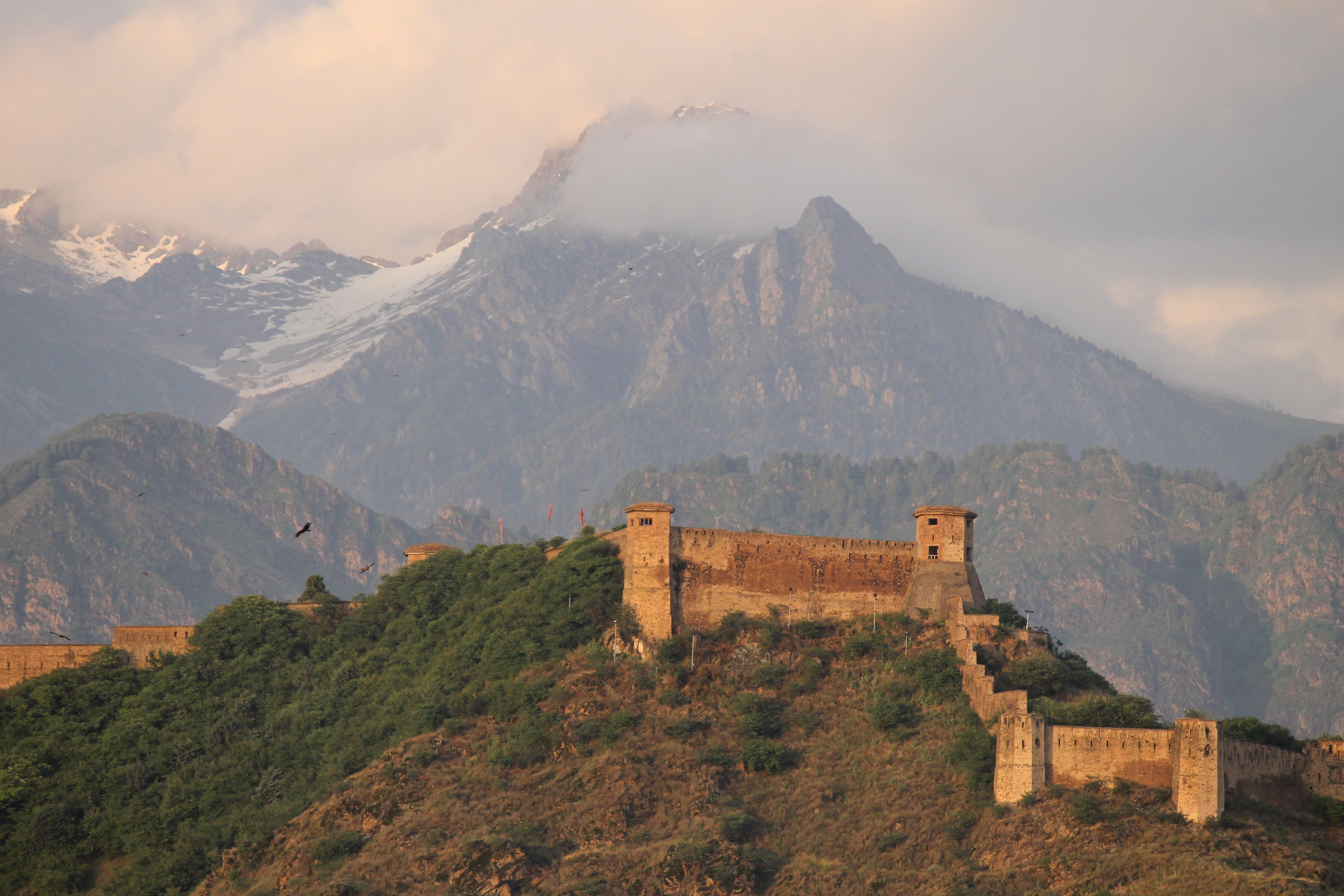
Fort atop Hari Parbat with the snow-capped Mount Mahadev in the background; the fort was built during Durrani rule on top of a Mughal fortification built by Akbar

In 1753, Kashmir passed into the hands of the Afghan Durrani Empire. The Afghans undertook reconstructions in Srinagar and built the palace at Shergarhi at the site of a pre-existing ancient palace, as well as the fort atop Hari Parbat. However, contemporary accounts describe the city as filthy and deteriorating, and it also saw worsening inter-community relations during Afghan rule, with repeated Hindu-Muslim and Shia-Sunni riots, and state persecution of Pandits. In 1819, the Sikh Empire assumed control of Kashmir. Under them, Srinagar, the old name of the city, was restored. The situation in the city did not improve much under Sikh rule, and the city remained in a state of decay. They also imposed several restrictions on Muslim religious expression, and closed the gates of the Jamia Mosque, which remained closed until 1843. A Shia-Sunni riot happened in the city in 1837. Shawls from Kashmir found their way to markets in Europe through British company rule in India and became popular there, such that, during the early 19th century European merchants procured shawls directly from Srinagar through their agents.

=== Dogra rule ===
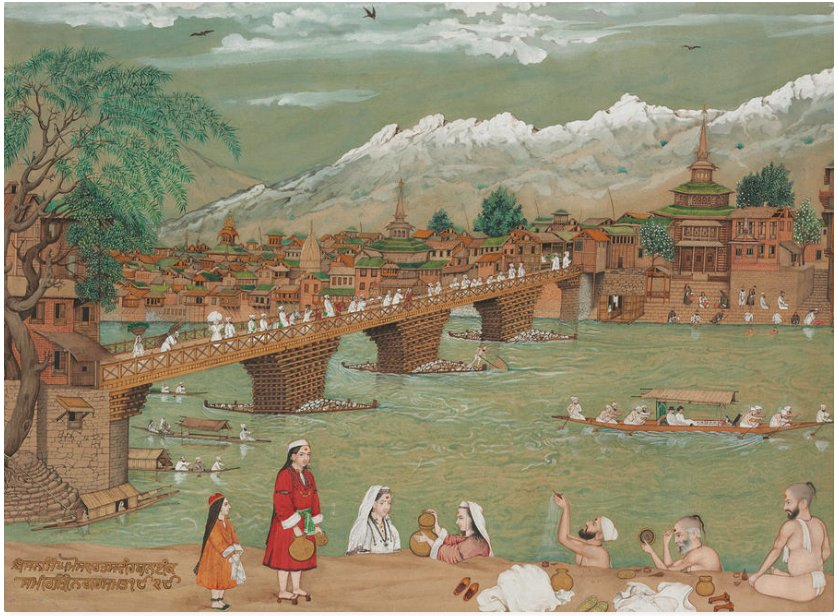
1872 painting depicting the city of Srinagar.

With the establishment of Dogra rule following the 1846 Treaty of Amritsar, Srinagar became the capital of the princely state of Jammu and Kashmir. The Jammu-based dynasty's founder Gulab Singh brought production and trade under state control, and laid the foundation of a state seeking to draw its legitimacy from the valley's Hindu past, alienating its majority Muslim population. The Dogras found Srinagar deteriorating, filthy and overcrowded. The Darbar Move was introduced in 1872 by Ranbir Singh, whereby the capital moved to Jammu for six months during the winter. The Dagh shawl department, established since Afghan rule and brought under firm state control by Dogras, benefited the city’s shawl merchants but distressed its weavers. (Note: The weavers agitated against the department in 1865. For a detailed account, see Zutshi 2003, ch. 2, section "City on a Shawl: The Srinagar Shawl Trade, 1846–1883.") The city used to see several break-outs of cholera, as well as earthquakes, floods, fires and famines. The famine of 1877–79 is said to have halved the city's population. Consequently, due to the famine as well as the forced labour (begar) in the villages, a considerable number of people migrated to Srinagar. The Raghunath Temple was completed during Ranbir Singh's rule. With a global decline in shawl trade during late 19th century due to a war in Europe, the shawl weaving industry of the city was upended and Dagh shawl department was abolished.

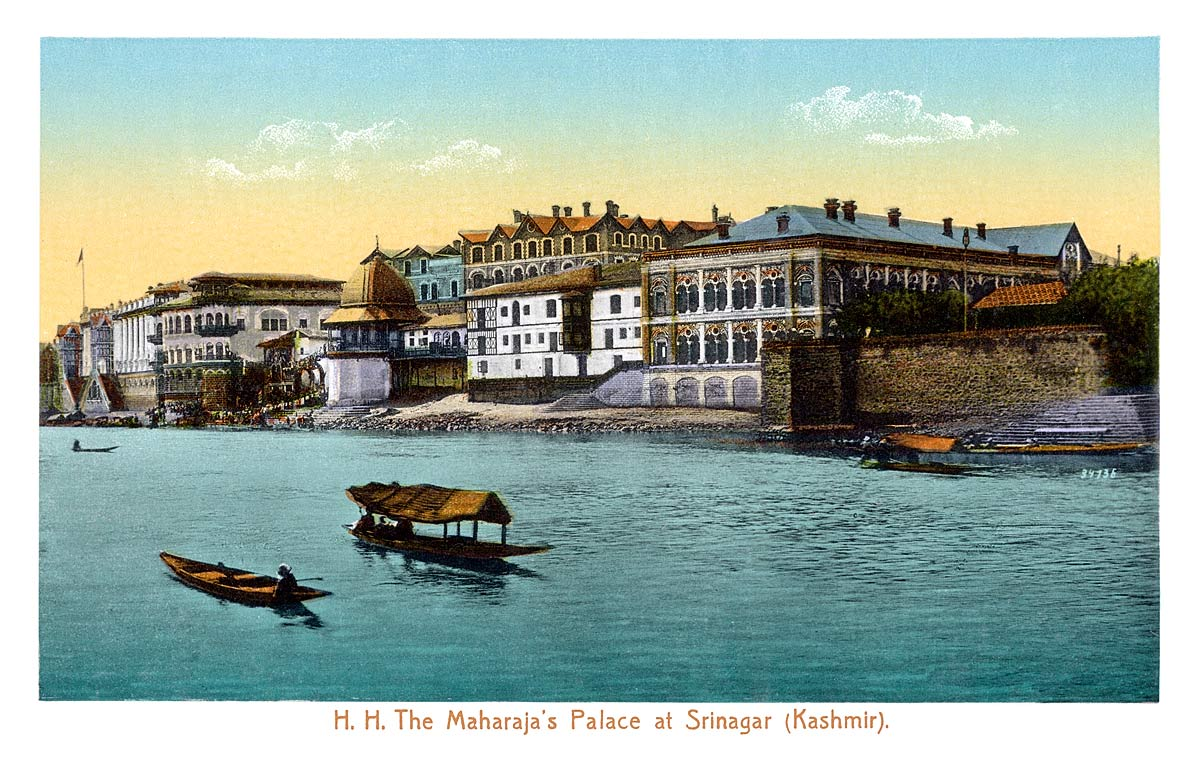
Early 20th century painting of Sher Garhi Palace, the official residence of the Dogra rulers in Srinagar

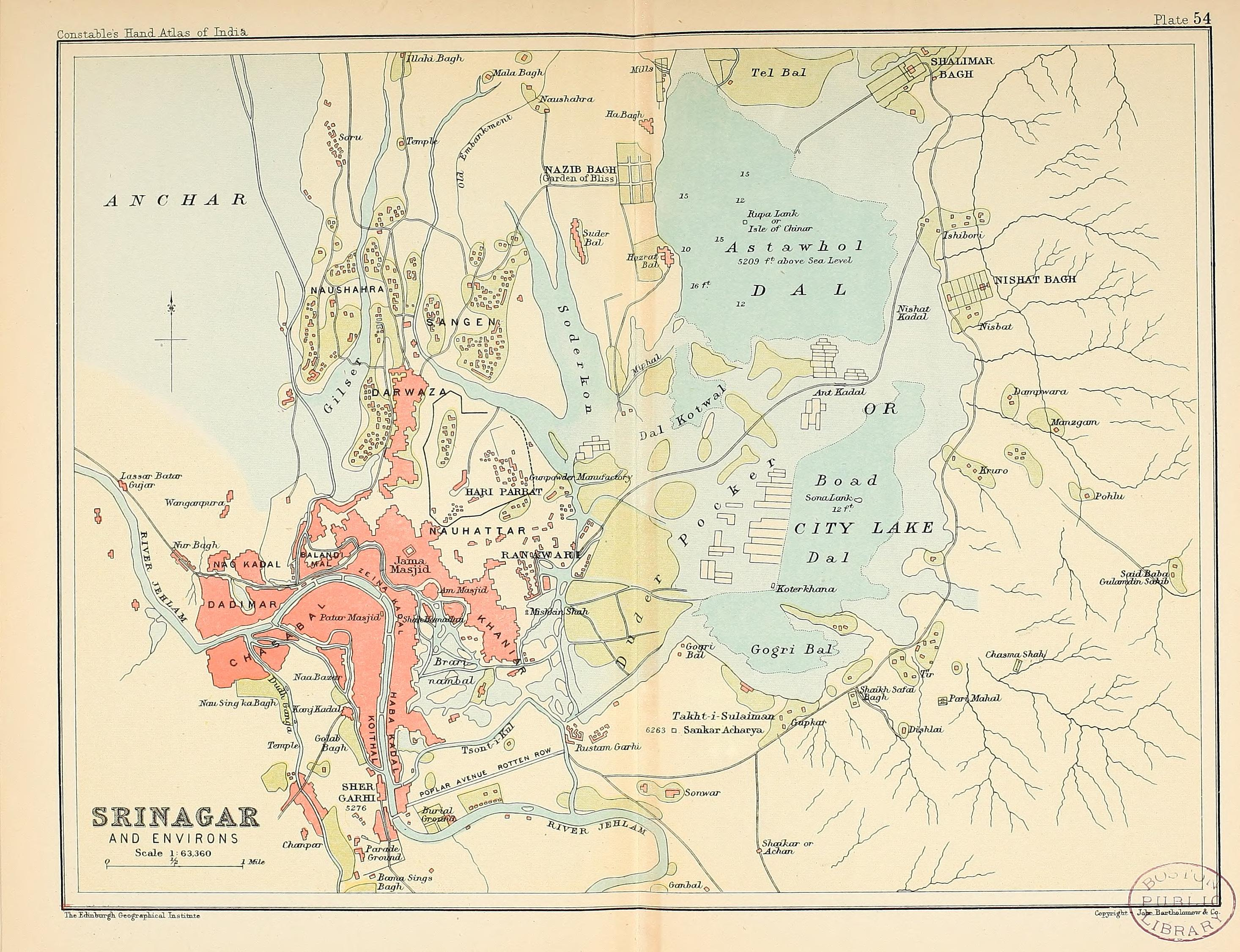
1893 map of Srinagar and its surroundings

Several changes were ushered in during the reign of Pratap Singh (1885–1925). A British Residency was established in Srinagar and direct British influence on the administration of the state grew. During this time, Srinagar, and in turn the Kashmir Valley, was connected to the rest of India via roads, which saw increased trade with Punjab. In 1886, a municipality was established for the city of Srinagar. Works for sanitation and urban development undertaken by the municipality were often met with stiff opposition by the residents, who were averse to changes. A fire in May 1892 and a flood in 1893 devastated the city. In the late 19th and early 20th century, modern tourism began to take hold in the city, especially on and around the Dal lake, with houseboats being built to accommodate British officers and their families who came in the summers seeking respite from the heat of the plains of northern India. The Shergarhi Palace was greatly modified by the Dogras, who used it as their official residence in the city. Pratap Singh and his successor Hari Singh also laid out several parks in the city. The city's silk industry saw growth, and silk became a major export of the region, replacing shawls. The city expanded rapidly between 1891 and 1941, partly due to increased migration from the countryside as a result of famines and due to improvements in sanitation and urban development as well as economic expansion, in particular the growth of the textile and tourism industries in the city. Many Punjabis also settled in Srinagar during this time for trade, commerce and administration. The region grew prosperous by the turn of the century.

By the 1910s, Srinagar began to suffer from unrestricted growth, over-crowding, sanitation problems, grain shortages and intense competition for jobs. Aggregation of people with disparate religious ideologies in the city exasperated conflict. Agitations in the city in 1924 (by silk factory workers) and in 1931 (against arrest of a Punjabi Muslim) were put down violently by Dogra forces; the latter subsequently set off riots targeting Hindus in the city and later Hindu-Muslim riots across the princely state. (Note: For more details, see Zutshi 2003, ch. 5, section "1931: Events, Meanings, and Outcomes") In the early twentieth century, the Mirwaizes of Jamia Masjid and Khanqah-e-Moula competed with each other for control over the city’s Muslim shrines and over leadership of Kashmiri Muslims, and debated the permissibility of shrine worship. Sheikh Abdullah, heading the Muslim Conference formed in 1932, used advocacy for shrine worship, public narrations of the Quran, and provocative critique of the Dogras to overcome the Mirwaiz in becoming the foremost Kashmiri Muslim leader. The efforts of Abdullah, Bakshi Ghulam Mohammad and Prem Nath Bazaz broadened this Srinagar-based Muslim movement to incorporate rural, working class, and Hindu minority groups into it, which, coupled with influence from the Indian National Congress, lead to the conversion of the Muslim Conference into a secular National Conference in 1939. In April 1946, Abdullah launched the Quit Kashmir movement against Dogra rulers from the Hazratbal shrine in the city.

=== Partition and Independence ===
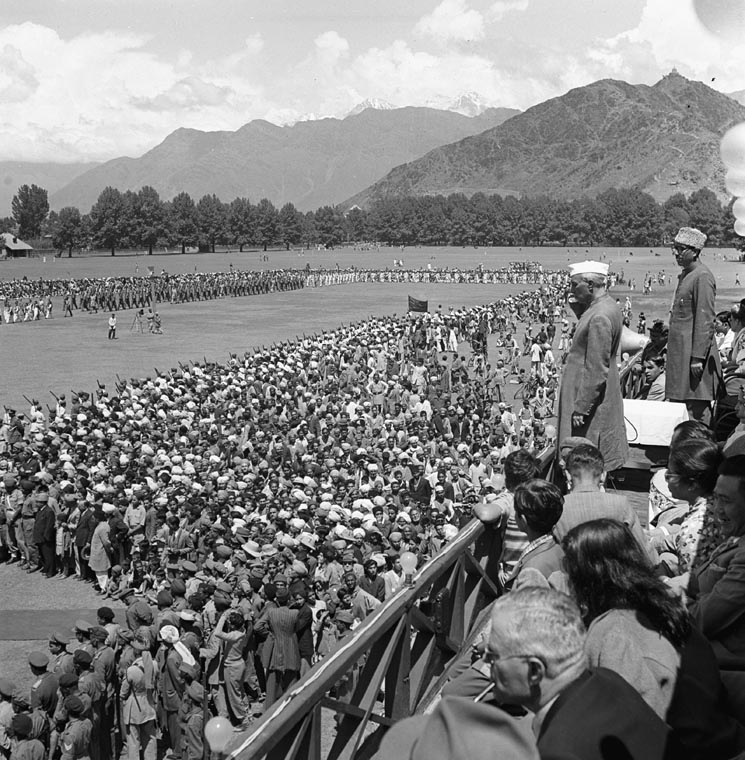
Indian Prime Miniter Jawaharlal Nehru attending a parade of NC's Kashmiri militias in Srinagar in 1948

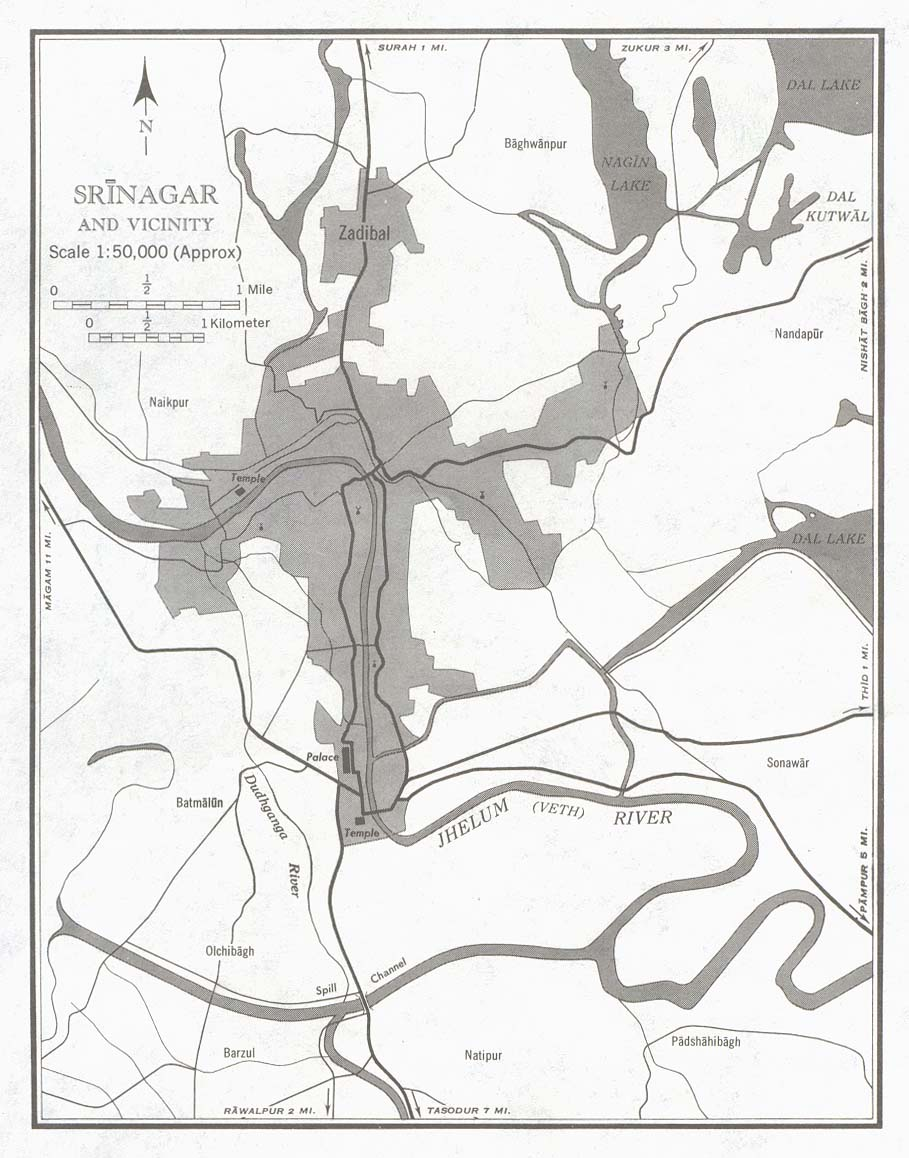
A 1959 map of Srinagar city and its vicinity

In 1947, after the princely state's accession to India following an invasion of the state by Pakistani irregulars in the aftermath of the partition of India, Indian forces were airlifted to Srinagar on 27 October to defend the city and the larger Kashmir valley. The National Conference (NC) also established a popular people's militia in the city to aid the Indian army in their defence of the territory. The invaders closed in on the city of Srinagar after days of looting, rapes and massacres, initially against Hindus and Sikhs and later also Muslims, on the way. The army, aided by Kashmiri militias, engaged the invaders on Srinagar’s outskirts, and pushed them out of the valley by early November. The main square of the city was named Lal Chowk (lit. 'red square', after the square in Moscow) by the communist-influenced NC government, which headed the emergency administration, in 1947. Srinagar became the summer capital of the Indian state of Jammu and Kashmir when it was established in 1952. In 1963–1964, the relic at the Hazratbal Shrine in Srinagar briefly disappeared, causing political turmoil, with large protests in the city against the government of Bakshi Ghulam Mohammad, and attacks on his family, who were perceived to be involved in the relic's disappearance; the turmoil was also used by some leaders to advance secessionist politics and lead to Sheikh Abdullah’s release from detention to much jubilation in the city. Following this, the shrine was reconstructed between 1968 and 1979 in a Mughal-inspired style. In January 1965, Abdullah condemned attempts at closer integration of the state into the country at a Plebiscite Front rally in Srinagar; crowds from the rally later perpetrated anti-Hindu rioting in the city.

In the late 1980s and early 1990s, Srinagar became the focus of much of the fighting between militants and security forces in the early phase of the armed insurgency in the region. Militants destroyed bridges, shops, schools and government buildings, often deliberately fought security forces in areas where civilian casualties would be highest, and carried out assassinations of civilians in the city. During this period, the city saw popular upsurge and large processions against Indian rule, prompting imposition of curfews. The local police became unable to control the situation, and armed forces used excessive force against protesters, killing hundreds in incidents like the Gawkadal massacre. Intimidation and violence from militants, meanwhile, also caused the displacement of Kashmiri Hindus. Militant threats asking the Hindus to leave Kashmir were carried by some newspapers based in the city. Srinagar was home to nearly half of the Kashmir Valley's total Hindu population prior to their displacement, and localities such as Rainawari, Habba Kadal and Karan Nagar were mainly inhabited by Hindus. A number of Islamist militant groups also began attacking the city's bars, cinema halls and beauty salons. Military presence became ubiquitous as bunkers and checkpoints dotted the city’s streets. Several older structures in the city were turned into detention centres notorious for torture, though most were later restored to their original purposes or assumed other roles.

The city remained largely free of violence in the later period of militancy in the region, and a sense of normalcy returned by mid-1990s as militancy shifted to the countryside. In 1999 and the early 2000s, a series of fidayeen attacks by jihadist militant groups targeting the city’s security and civilian infrastructure, including an attack on the state legislative assembly, killed hundreds of people. Protests against Indian rule still occur with large demonstrations happening in 2008, 2010, 2013, and 2016. Srinagar was devastated by floods in 2014 due to torrential monsoon rains. The floods submerged more than half of the city's area, affected most of its population, and severed road and communication links. Disaster response from the state government was inadequate, and relief efforts were largely carried out by local volunteers, Indian armed forces, NDRF, and various NGOs. After revocation of the state's special status and its conversion into union territory in 2019, the city, like the rest of the former state, was put under strict lockdown with communications restricted. Protests in the city were pre-empted, contained or swiftly dispersed. Since 2019, Srinagar has witnessed occasional incidents of targeted killings of minority Hindus and Sikhs and of migrant workers, as well as attacks on civilian areas and police, by new hybrid factions of existing jihadist militant groups.

== Geography ==
The city is located on both the sides of the Jhelum River, called Vyath in Kashmir. The river passes through the city and meanders through the valley, moving onward and deepening in the Wular Lake. The city is known for its nine old bridges, connecting the two parts of the city.

There are a number of lakes and swamps in and around the city. These include the Dal, the Nigeen, the Anchar, Khushal Sar, Gil Sar and Hokersar.

Hokersar is a wetland situated near Srinagar. Thousands of migratory birds come to Hokersar from Siberia and other regions in the winter season. Migratory birds from Siberia and Central Asia use wetlands in Kashmir as their transitory camps between September and October and again around spring. These wetlands play a vital role in sustaining a large population of wintering, staging and breeding birds.

Hokersar is 14 km (8.7 mi) north of Srinagar, and is a world class wetland spread over 13.75 km^{2} (5.31 sq mi) including lake and marshy area. It is the most accessible and well-known of Kashmir's wetlands which include Hygam, Shalibug and Mirgund. A record number of migratory birds have visited Hokersar in recent years.

Birds found in Hokersar are migratory ducks and geese which include brahminy duck, tufted duck, gadwall, garganey, greylag goose, mallard, common merganser, northern pintail, common pochard, ferruginous pochard, red-crested pochard, ruddy shelduck, northern shoveller, common teal, and Eurasian wigeon.

=== Climate ===
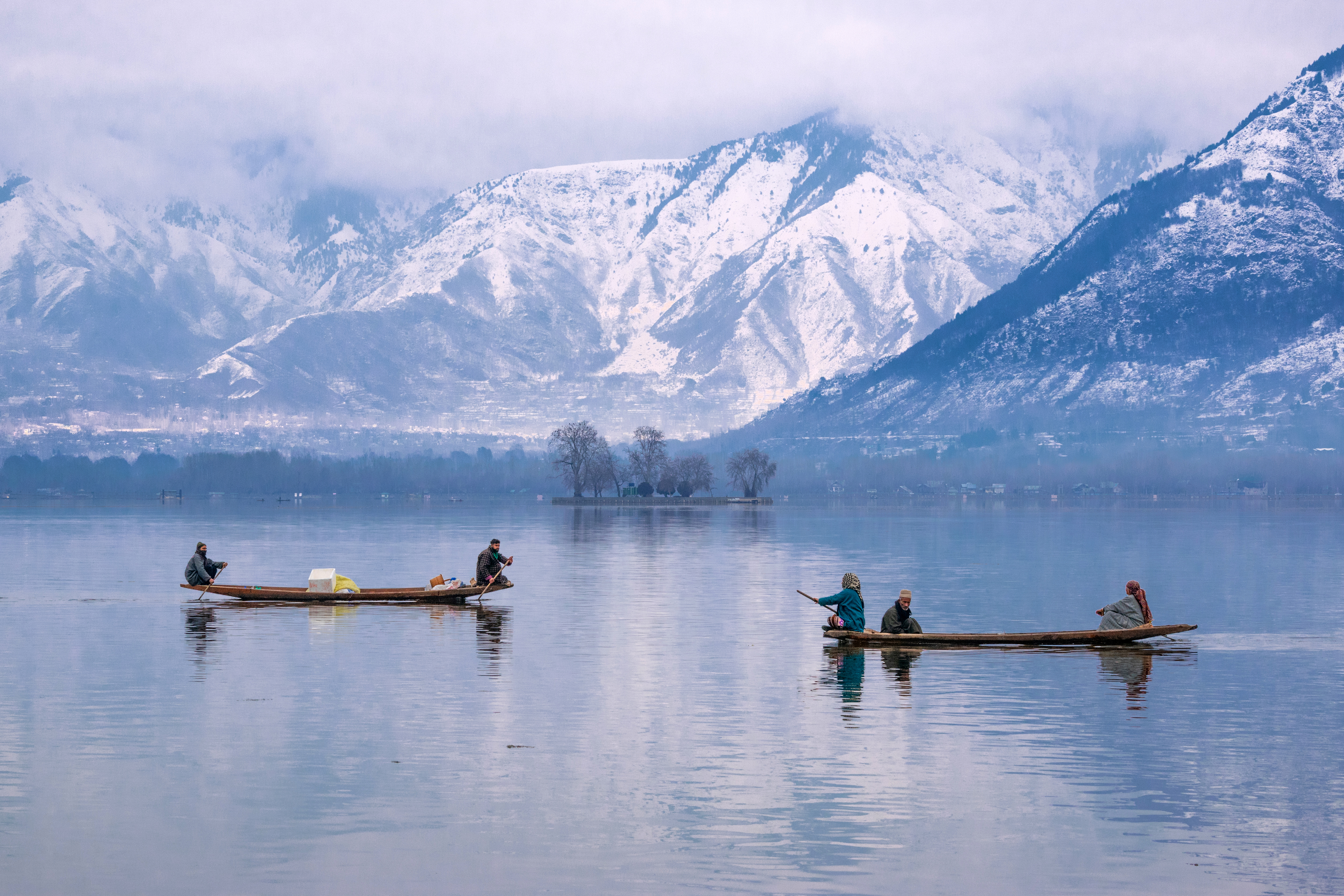
View of the Dal Lake in Srinagar after snowfall

Under the Köppen climate classification, Srinagar has a four-season humid subtropical climate (Cfa) with moderately hot summers and cool winters. The valley is surrounded by the Himalayas on all sides. Due to influence from Himalayan rain shadow and western disturbances, Srinagar has year-round precipitation; the spring season is the wettest while autumn is the driest. The region also has less rain from the southwest monsoon in the summer due to lying in the leeward side of the rain shadow which reduces these winds from the south. Winters are colder in the region than most areas with monsoon climates due to these influences and its elevation, resulting in higher temperature variations similar to continental climates.

Moderate to heavy snowfall occurs in winter and the highway connecting Srinagar with the rest of India faces frequent blockades due to icy roads, landslides and avalanches. Daily maximum temperatures average 7.1 °C (44.8 °F) in January and drop below freezing point at night. Summers are warm to hot, slightly moderated from its elevation, with a July daytime average of 30.0 °C (86.0 °F). The average annual rainfall is around 697.5 millimetres (27.46 in). The highest temperature reliably recorded is 38.3 °C (100.9 °F) recorded on 10 July 1946, and the lowest is −20.0 °C (−4.0 °F) recorded on 6 February 1895.

Climate data for Srinagar (1991–2020, extremes 1893–2020)
Month	Jan	Feb	Mar	Apr	May	Jun	Jul	Aug	Sep	Oct	Nov	Dec	Year
Record high °C (°F)	17.2 (63.0)	20.6 (69.1)	28.3 (82.9)	31.1 (88.0)	36.4 (97.5)	37.8 (100.0)	38.3 (100.9)	36.7 (98.1)	35.0 (95.0)	33.9 (93.0)	24.5 (76.1)	18.3 (64.9)	38.3 (100.9)
Mean daily maximum °C (°F)	7.1 (44.8)	10.5 (50.9)	15.5 (59.9)	20.6 (69.1)	24.7 (76.5)	28.5 (83.3)	30.0 (86.0)	29.7 (85.5)	27.6 (81.7)	23.0 (73.4)	15.9 (60.6)	9.9 (49.8)	20.2 (68.4)
Daily mean °C (°F)	2.5 (36.5)	5.5 (41.9)	10.0 (50.0)	14.3 (57.7)	18.0 (64.4)	21.6 (70.9)	24.2 (75.6)	23.7 (74.7)	20.0 (68.0)	14.4 (57.9)	8.3 (46.9)	4.0 (39.2)	13.9 (57.0)
Mean daily minimum °C (°F)	−1.9 (28.6)	0.7 (33.3)	4.3 (39.7)	7.9 (46.2)	11.2 (52.2)	15.0 (59.0)	18.4 (65.1)	17.8 (64.0)	13.1 (55.6)	6.2 (43.2)	1.2 (34.2)	−1.6 (29.1)	7.5 (45.5)
Record low °C (°F)	−14.4 (6.1)	−20.0 (−4.0)	−6.9 (19.6)	0.0 (32.0)	1.0 (33.8)	7.2 (45.0)	10.3 (50.5)	9.5 (49.1)	4.4 (39.9)	−1.7 (28.9)	−7.8 (18.0)	−12.8 (9.0)	−20.0 (−4.0)
Average precipitation mm (inches)	63.6 (2.50)	85.0 (3.35)	104.6 (4.12)	91.8 (3.61)	63.5 (2.50)	46.4 (1.83)	64.0 (2.52)	64.5 (2.54)	37.4 (1.47)	21.8 (0.86)	27.7 (1.09)	27.2 (1.07)	697.5 (27.46)
Average precipitation days (≥ 0.3 mm)	8.5	9.9	11	11.1	10.9	8.2	9.2	8.9	5.5	3.4	3.7	4.6	94.9
Average rainy days	5.4	6.0	7.2	7.0	5.9	4.1	5.0	5.4	3.1	2.0	2.2	2.6	55.9
Average relative humidity (%) (at 17:30 IST)	67	59	52	49	49	47	53	55	52	54	62	68	55
Average dew point °C (°F)	−2 (28)	1 (34)	3 (37)	7 (45)	11 (52)	14 (57)	17 (63)	17 (63)	13 (55)	8 (46)	3 (37)	0 (32)	8 (46)
Mean monthly sunshine hours	74.4	101.7	136.4	189.0	238.7	246.0	241.8	226.3	228.0	226.3	186.0	108.5	2,203.1
Mean daily sunshine hours	2.4	3.6	4.4	6.3	7.7	8.2	7.8	7.3	7.6	7.3	6.2	3.5	6.0
Average ultraviolet index	3	5	7	10	12	12	12	12	9	6	4	3	8
Source 1: India Meteorological Department NOAA(precipitation-extremes)Time and Date (dewpoints, 2005–2015)
Source 2: Deutscher Wetterdienst (sun 1945–1988), Tokyo Climate Center (mean temperatures 1991–2020) Weather Atlas, Ultraviolet

Srinagar has been ranked 43rd best “National Clean Air City” (under Category 1 >10L Population cities) in India.

== Economy ==
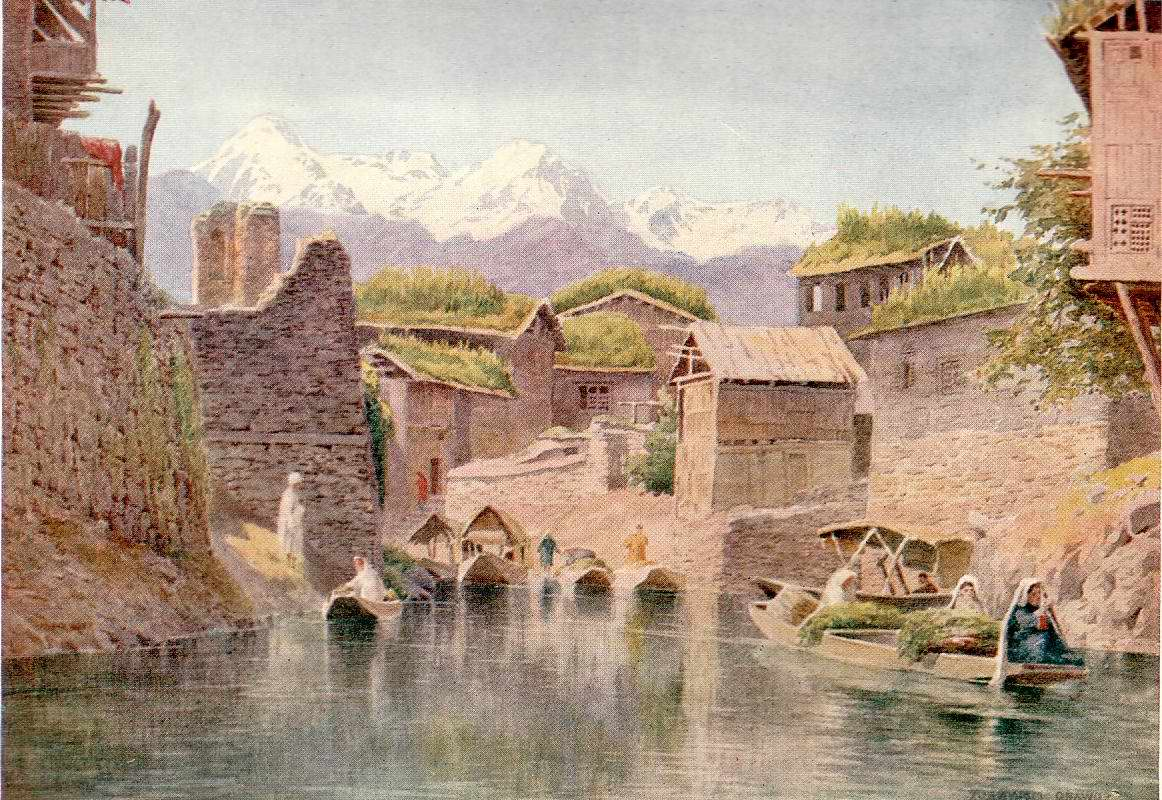
Market boats on Mar Canal in Srinagar

In November 2011, the City Mayors Foundation – an advocacy think tank – announced that Srinagar was the 92nd fastest growing urban areas in the world in terms of economic growth, based on actual data from 2006 onwards and projections to 2020.

=== Tourism ===
Srinagar is one of several places that have been called the "Venice of the East". Lakes around the city include Dal Lake – noted for its houseboats – and Nigeen Lake. Apart from Dal Lake and Nigeen Lake, Wular Lake and Manasbal Lake both lie to the north of Srinagar. Wular Lake is one of the largest fresh water lakes in Asia.

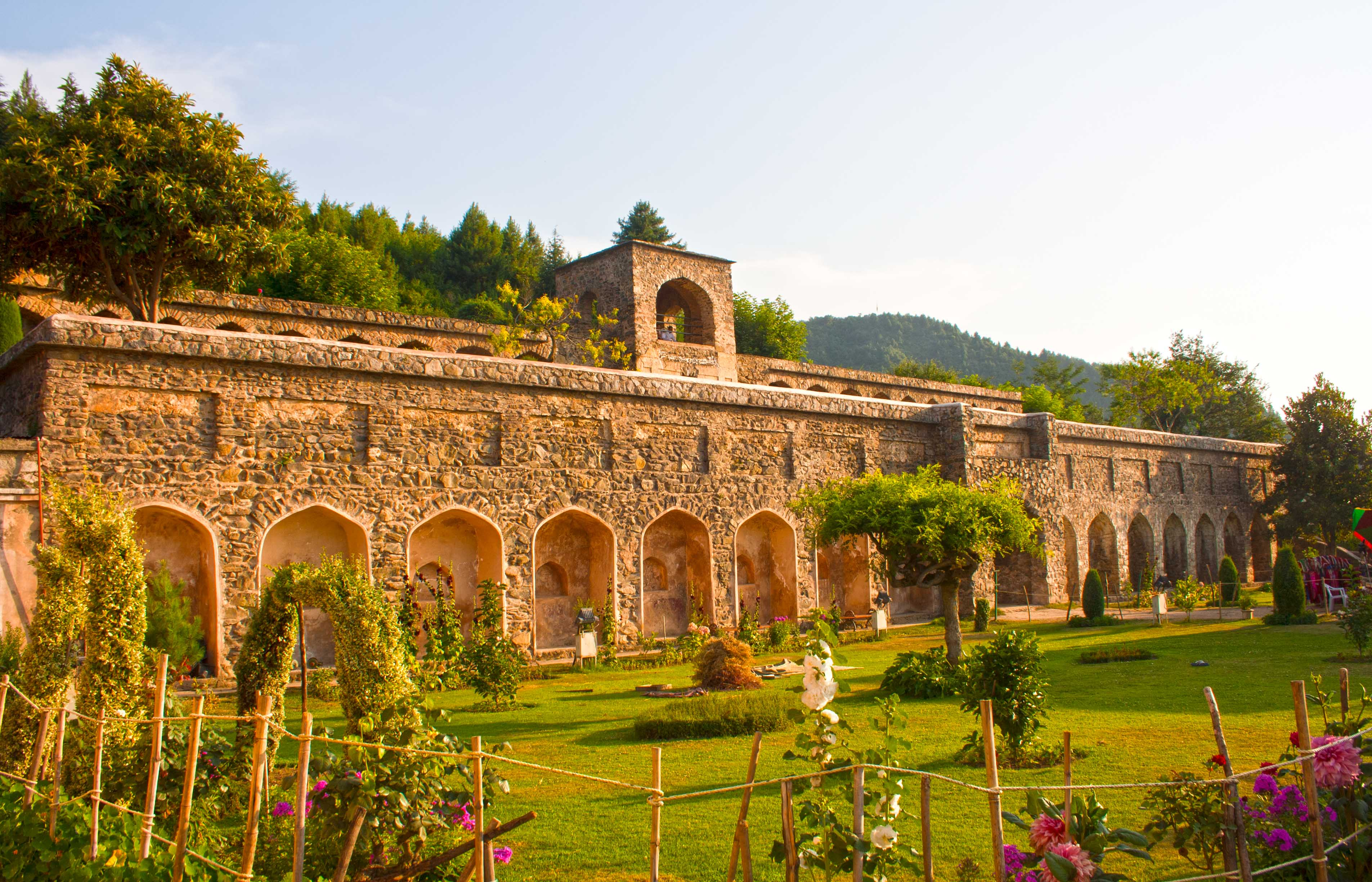
Pari Mahal

Srinagar has some Mughal gardens, forming a part of those laid by the Mughal emperors across the Indian subcontinent. Those of Srinagar and its close vicinity include Chashma Shahi (the royal fountains); Pari Mahal (the palace of the fairies); Nishat Bagh (the garden of spring); Shalimar Bagh; the Naseem Bagh. Jawaharlal Nehru Memorial Botanical Garden is a botanical garden in the city, set up in 1969. The Indian government has included these gardens under "Mughal Gardens of Jammu and Kashmir" in the tentative list for sites to be included in world Heritage sites.

The Sher Garhi Palace houses administrative buildings from the state government. Another palace of the Maharajas, the Gulab Bhavan, has now become the Lalit Grand Palace hotel.

The Shankaracharya Temple lies on a hill top in the middle of the city.

== Government and politics ==
The city is administered by the Srinagar Municipal Corporation (SMC) under the leadership of a Mayor. Established in 1886, the Srinagar Municipal Corporation comprises 74 wards and covers an area of 227.34 km^{2} (87.78 sq mi), with boundaries extending from Pandach-Nagbal in the north to Mujgund-Abdullahpora in the northwest. The SMC is organised into two wings: the deliberative wing (Mayor) and the executive wing (Commissioner). As of 2026, the Commissioner is Fazlul Haseeb, IAS. The last municipal elections were held in 2018.

The SMC is responsible for sanitation, town planning, revenue, birth and death registration, development, and grievance redressal. The corporation has achieved progress in e-governance, solid waste collection and disposal, beautification, creation of green spaces, and improvement of drainage networks. In April 2026, Commissioner Fazlul Haseeb assured full support to resolve drainage issues affecting Kargil hostels and colonies in Srinagar following a meeting with CEC Dr. Jaffer Akhoon.

=== Environmental compliance ===
In October 2024, on the direction of the National Green Tribunal (NGT), the Jammu and Kashmir Pollution Control Committee (JKPCC) imposed an environmental compensation penalty of over ₹41.67 crore (US$4.5 million) on the SMC for failing to prevent pollution in the Doodh Ganga river. In January 2026, the NGT imposed an additional penalty of ₹15,000 (US$160) on the SMC for failing to submit a required progress report regarding the management of 11 lakh metric tonnes (1.1 million tonnes) of legacy waste at the Achan landfill site. Regarding sewage treatment, as of July 2024, the NGT recorded that out of 163.546 million litres per day (MLD) of sewage generated daily in Srinagar, only approximately 60 MLD is treated, leaving a large quantity of untreated sewage flowing into local water bodies.

=== Stray dog management ===
Stray dogs remain a significant urban management concern in Srinagar. According to a 2023 survey, an estimated 64,416 stray dogs are present in the city, part of a total of 152,775 across major urban centres in Jammu and Kashmir. Between 2023 and September 2025, the SMC sterilised 15,266 stray dogs and vaccinated 15,725 against rabies through three Animal Birth Control (ABC) centres at Tengpora, Shuhama (SKUAST), and Ahal Chatterhama. The government reported 5,135 dog bite incidents in 2024–25 and 4,890 in 2025–26 (as of February 2026) in Srinagar district.

Chief Minister Omar Abdullah informed the Assembly in March 2026 that the ABC programme is monitored through a UT-level committee, real-time tracking via a mobile application, and CCTV surveillance, though no independent third-party evaluation has been conducted so far. Measures being implemented include expansion of ABC centres, designated feeding spots away from schools, deployment of mobile sterilisation units, and fencing of vulnerable public spaces.

=== Parliamentary representation ===
The Srinagar district, along with the adjoining Budgam and Ganderbal districts, forms the Srinagar Parliamentary seat. In the 2024 Indian Lok Sabha elections, Aga Syed Ruhullah Mehdi of the Jammu & Kashmir National Conference (JKNC) won the seat with 356,866 votes, defeating Waheed Ur Rehman Para of the Jammu & Kashmir Peoples Democratic Party (PDP), who received 168,450 votes. The voter turnout was 38.49%, a significant increase from 14.43% in 2019.

== Demographics ==
Historical population
Year	Pop.	±%
1901	122,618	—
1911	126,344	+3.0%
1921	141,735	+12.2%
1931	173,573	+22.5%
1941	207,787	+19.7%
1951	246,522	+18.6%
1961	285,257	+15.7%
1971	415,271	+45.6%
1981	594,775	+43.2%
1991		—
2001	935,764	—
2011	1,180,570	+26.2%

Religion in Srinagar (2011)
Islam	95.97%
Hinduism	2.75%
Sikhism	0.92%
Other or not stated	0.36%

As of 2011 census Srinagar urban agglomeration had a population of 1,264,202. Both the city and the urban agglomeration has average literacy rate of approximately 70%. The child population of both the city and the urban agglomeration is approximately 12% of the total population. Males constituted 53.0% and females 47% of the population. The sex ratio in the city area is 888 females per 1000 males, whereas in the urban agglomeration it is 880 per 1,000.

The predominant religion of Srinagar is Islam with 96% of the population being Muslim. Hindus constitute the second largest religious group representing 2.75% of the population, nearly all migrant workers from outside Kashmir as most local Kashmiri Hindus fled the city in the 1990s. The remaining population constitutes Sikhs, Buddhist and Jains. Kashmiri Hindus constituted 21.9% of Srinagar's population as per 1891 census and 2.75% as per 2011 census.

Languages of Srinagar district (2011)
1. Kashmiri (95.1%)
2. Hindi (1.49%)
3. Others (3.37%)

At the time of the 2011 census, 95.14% spoke Kashmiri and 1.49% Hindi as their first language.

== Transport ==
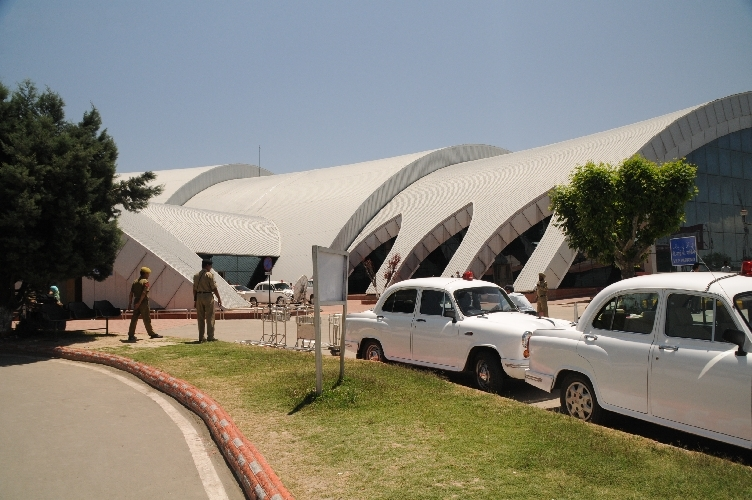
Srinagar International Airport

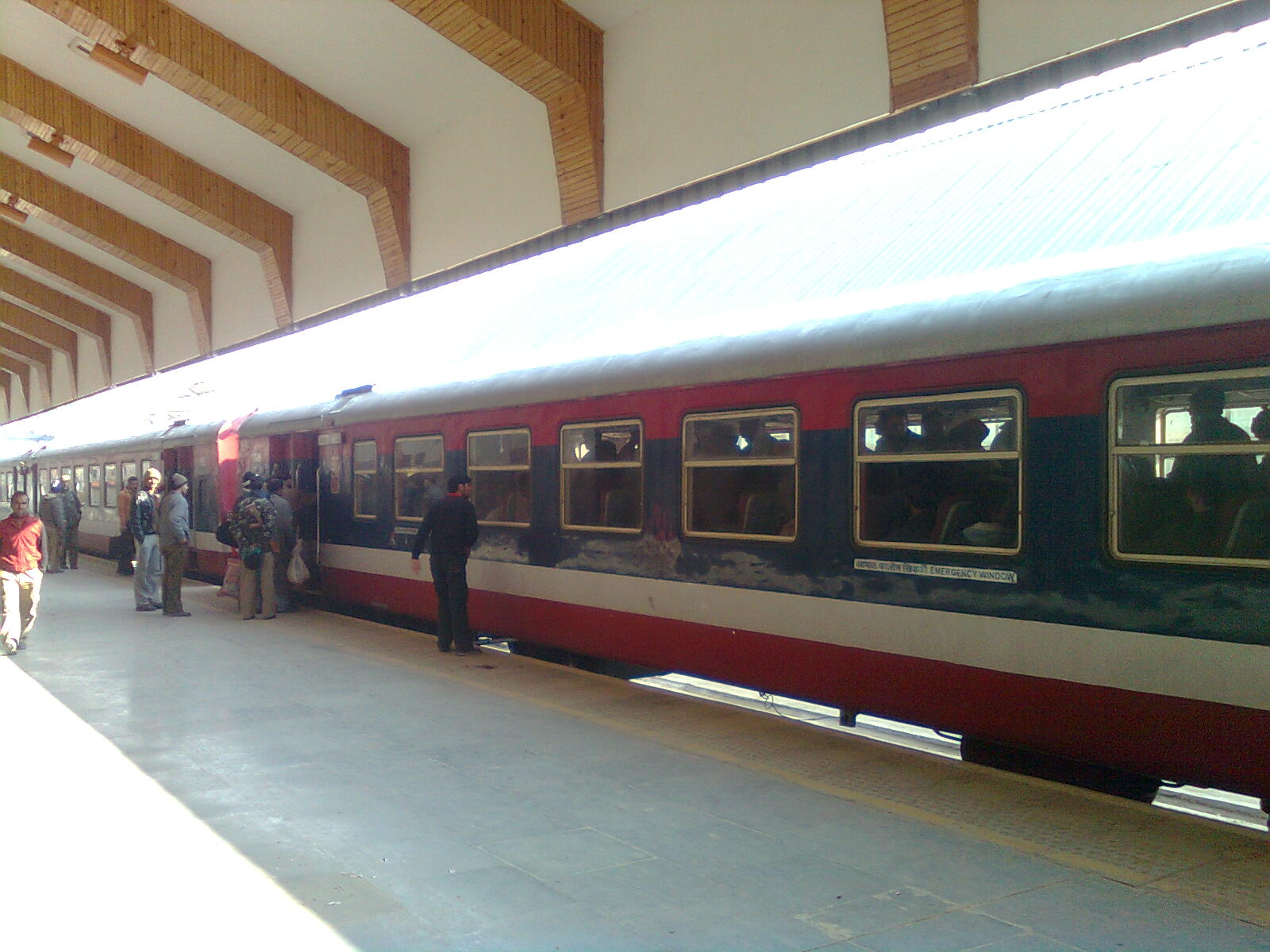
A passenger train at Srinagar Railway Station

=== Road ===
The city is served by many highways, including National Highway 1A and National Highway 1D.

=== Air ===
Srinagar International Airport has regular domestic flights to Leh, Jammu, Chandigarh, Delhi and Mumbai and occasional international flights. An expanded terminal capable of handling both domestic and international flights was inaugurated on 14 February 2009 with Air India Express flights to Dubai. Hajj flights also operate from this airport to Saudi Arabia.

=== Rail ===
Srinagar is a station on the 119 km (74 mi) long Banihal-Baramulla line that started in October 2009 and connects Baramulla to Srinagar, Anantnag and Qazigund. The railway track also connects to Banihal across the Pir Panjal mountains through a newly constructed 11 km long Banihal tunnel, and subsequently to the Indian railway network after a few years. It takes approximately 9 minutes and 30 seconds for a train to cross the tunnel. It is the longest rail tunnel in India. This railway system, proposed in 2001, is not expected to connect the Indian railway network until 2017 at the earliest, with a cost overrun of 55 billion INR. The train also runs during heavy snow.

There are proposals to develop a metro system in the city. The feasibility report for the Srinagar Metro is planned to be carried out by Delhi Metro Rail Corporation.

=== Cable car ===
In December 2013, the 594m cable car allowing people to travel to the Makhdoom Sahib Shrine on Hari Parbat was unveiled. The project is run by the Jammu and Kashmir Cable Car Corporation (JKCCC), and has been envisioned for 25 years. An investment of 300 million INR was made, and it is the second cable car in Kashmir after the Gulmarg Gondola.

=== Boat ===
While popular since the 7th century, water transport is now mainly confined to Dal Lake, where shikaras (wooden boats) are used for local transport and tourism. There are efforts to revive transportation on the River Jhelum.

== Culture ==
Like the territory of Jammu and Kashmir, Srinagar too has a distinctive blend of cultural heritage. Holy places in and around the city depict the historical cultural and religious diversity of the city as well as the Kashmir valley.

=== Places of worship ===
There are many religious holy places in Srinagar. They include:

- Hazratbal Mosque, only domed mosque in the city.
- Jama Masjid, Srinagar, one of the oldest mosques in Kashmir
- Khanqah-e-Moula Mosque, first Islamic centre in Kashmir
- Aali Mosque, in Eidgah Locality
- Hari Parbat hill hosts shrine of Sharika Mata temple
- Zeashta Devi Shrine a holy shrine for Kashmiri Hindus
- Shankaracharya temple
- Gurdwara Chatti Patshahi
- Pathar Masjid
- All Saints Church, Srinagar
- Holy Family Catholic Church (Srinagar)

Additional structures include the Dastgeer Sahib shrine, Mazar-e-Shuhada, Roza Bal shrine, Khanqah of Shah Hamadan, Pathar Masjid ("The Stone Mosque"), Hamza Makhdoom shrine, tomb of the mother of Zain-ul-abidin, tomb of Pir Haji Muhammad, Akhun Mulla Shah Mosque, cemetery of Baha-ud-din Sahib, tomb and Madin Sahib Mosque at Zadibal. Apart from these, dozens of smaller mosques are located all over the city. Several temples and temple ghats are located on the banks of river Jhelum in Srinagar, including Shurayar temple, Gadhadhar temple, Pratapishwar temple, Ganpatyar Ganesh temple, Purshyar temple, Sheshyar temple, Raghunath Mandir, Durga Patshala and Dhar temple. Gurdwaras are located in Rainawari, Amira Kadal, Jawahar Nagar, Mehjoor Nagar, Shaheed Gunj, Maharajpur and Indra Nagar areas of the city. There are three Christian churches in Srinagar.

The Sheikh Bagh Cemetery is a Christian cemetery located in Srinagar that dates from the British colonial era. The oldest grave in the cemetery is that of a British colonel from the 9th Lancers of 1850 and the cemetery is valued for the variety of persons buried there which provides an insight into the perils faced by British colonisers in India. It was damaged by floods in 2014. It contains a number of war graves. The notable interments here are Robert Thorpe and Jim Borst.

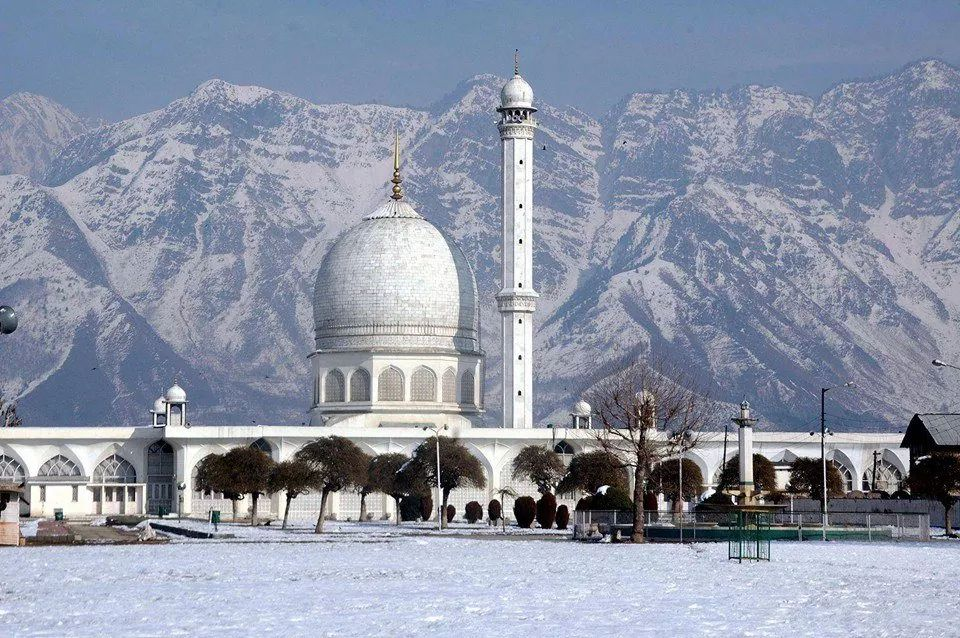
Hazratbal shrine

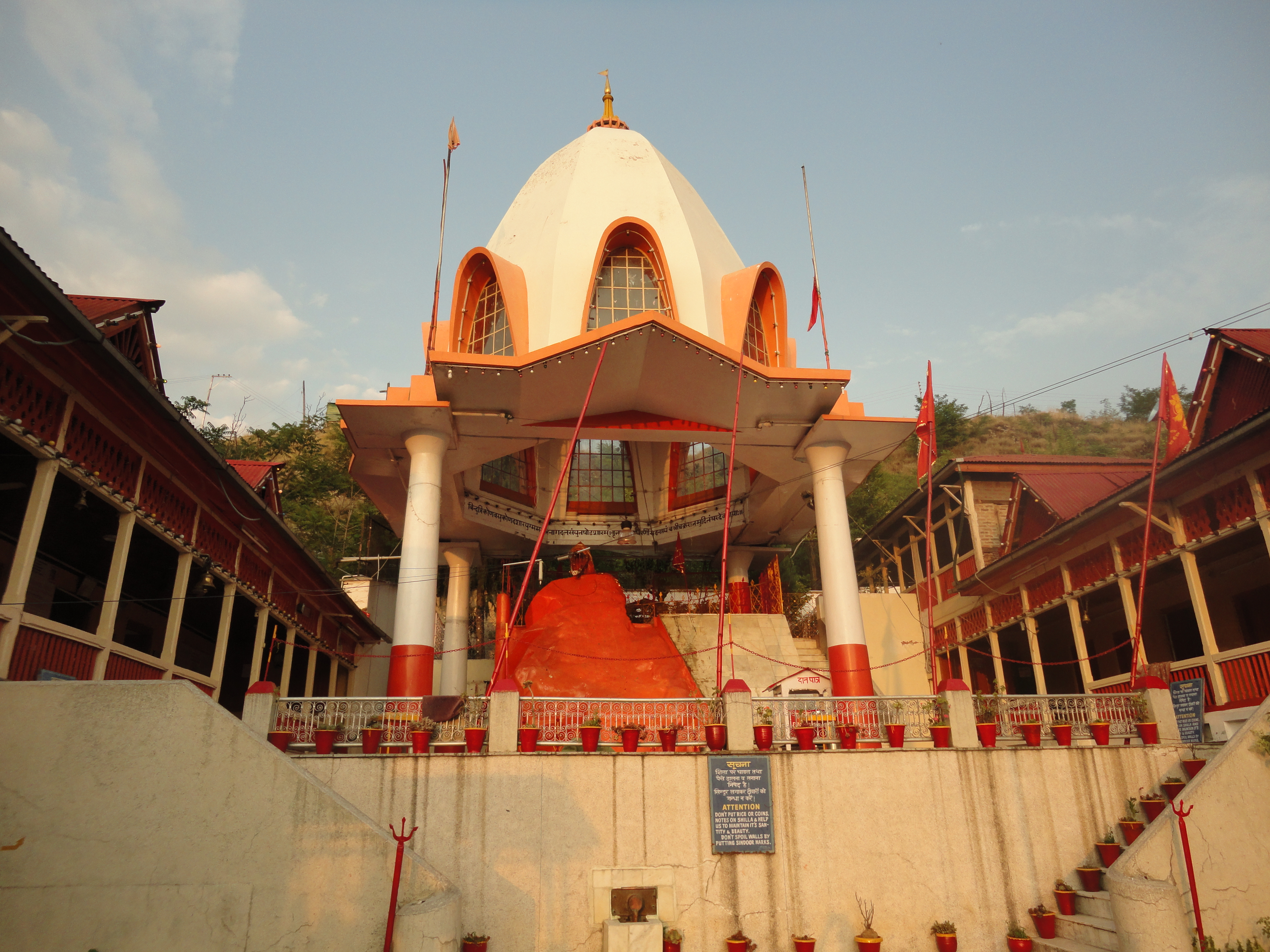
Sharika Mata Temple

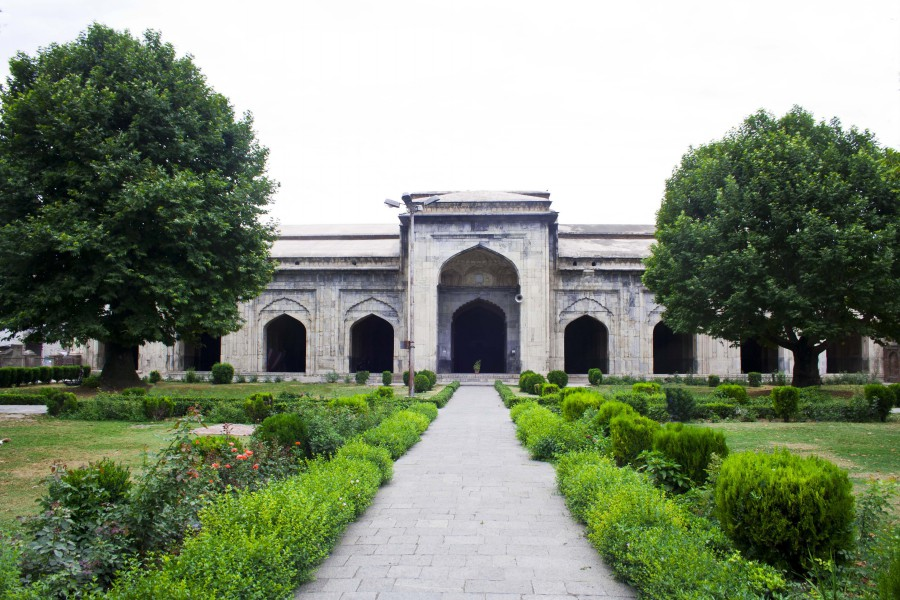
Pathar Mosque

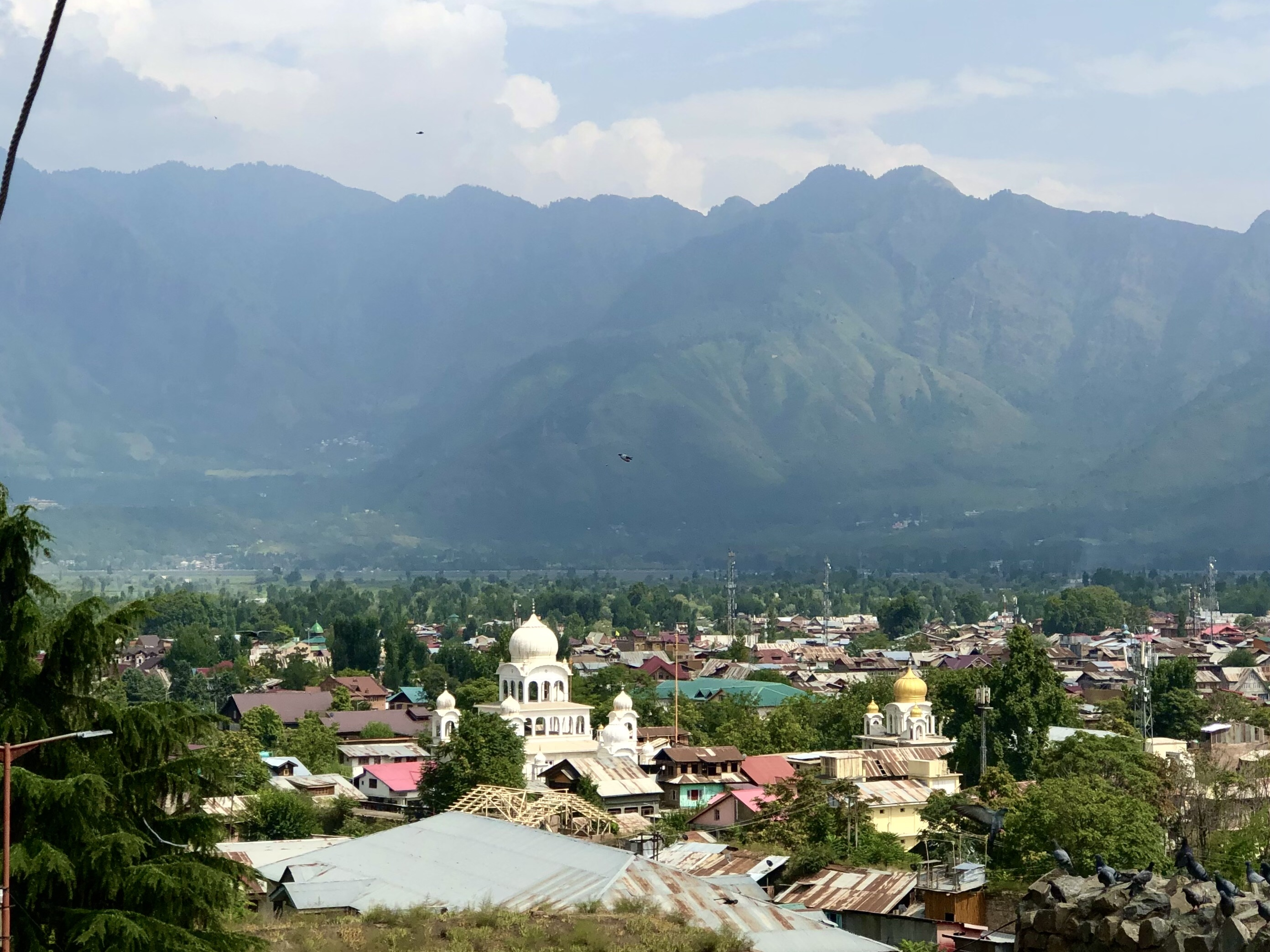
Gurdwara Chatti Patsahi

=== Performing arts ===
Kashmiri cuisine is an important part of Srinagar’s Culture. Here, both vegetarian and non-vegetarian dishes can be found. Wazwaan is a multi-course meal generally served at weddings. It is served on beautiful huge Copper plates called tream. Wazwaan is prepared by Male chefs.

Kahwa is a form of green tea and is made by boiling green tea leaves with local saffron, cinnamon, cardamom and Kashmiri roses.

Harissa is winter delicacy here generally eaten during chilai kalan ( a period of extreme cold; 40 days from 20 Dec ).Garnished with two wazwaan delicacies along and topped with hot smoking mustard oil, this is the spicy slow cooked meat usually served with Kashmiri bread Tchot. It is prepared for hours usually overnight and generally eaten in the early cold winter.

== Education ==
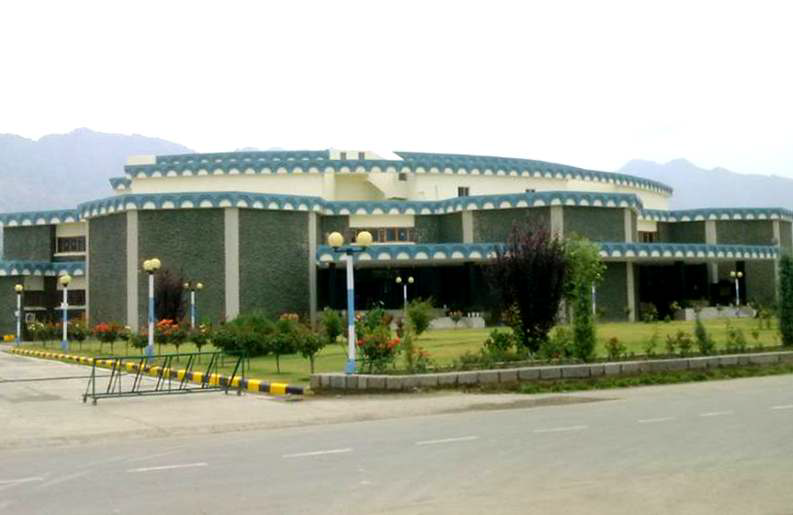
University of Kashmir

Srinagar is home to various premiere Higher Education Institutes including the University of Kashmir, the Cluster University of Srinagar, Central University of Kashmir besides the National Institute of Technology Srinagar formerly known as Regional Engineering College (REC Srinagar). Most of these are among the oldest and earliest Institutions of the country including the University of Kashmir dating back to 1948 while the National Institute of Technology Srinagar was established during the second Five year plan. The educational institutions in the City include:

=== Schools ===
- Tyndale Biscoe School
- Presentation Convent Higher Secondary School
- Burn Hall School
- Mallinson Girls School
- Delhi Public School, Srinagar
- Little Angels High School, Srinagar
- Green Valley Educational Institute

=== Medical colleges ===
- Government Medical College, Srinagar
- SMHS Hospital
- Sher-i-Kashmir Institute of Medical Sciences

=== Universities ===
- University of Kashmir
- Sher-e-Kashmir University of Agricultural Sciences and Technology of Kashmir
- Central University of Kashmir
- Cluster University of Srinagar

=== General degree colleges ===
- Amar Singh College
- Sri Pratap College
- Islamia College of Science and Commerce, Srinagar

== Broadcasting ==
Srinagar is broadcasting hub for radio channels in UT which are Radio Mirchi 98.3FM, Red FM 93.5 and AIR Srinagar. State television channel DD Kashir is also broadcast.

== Sports ==
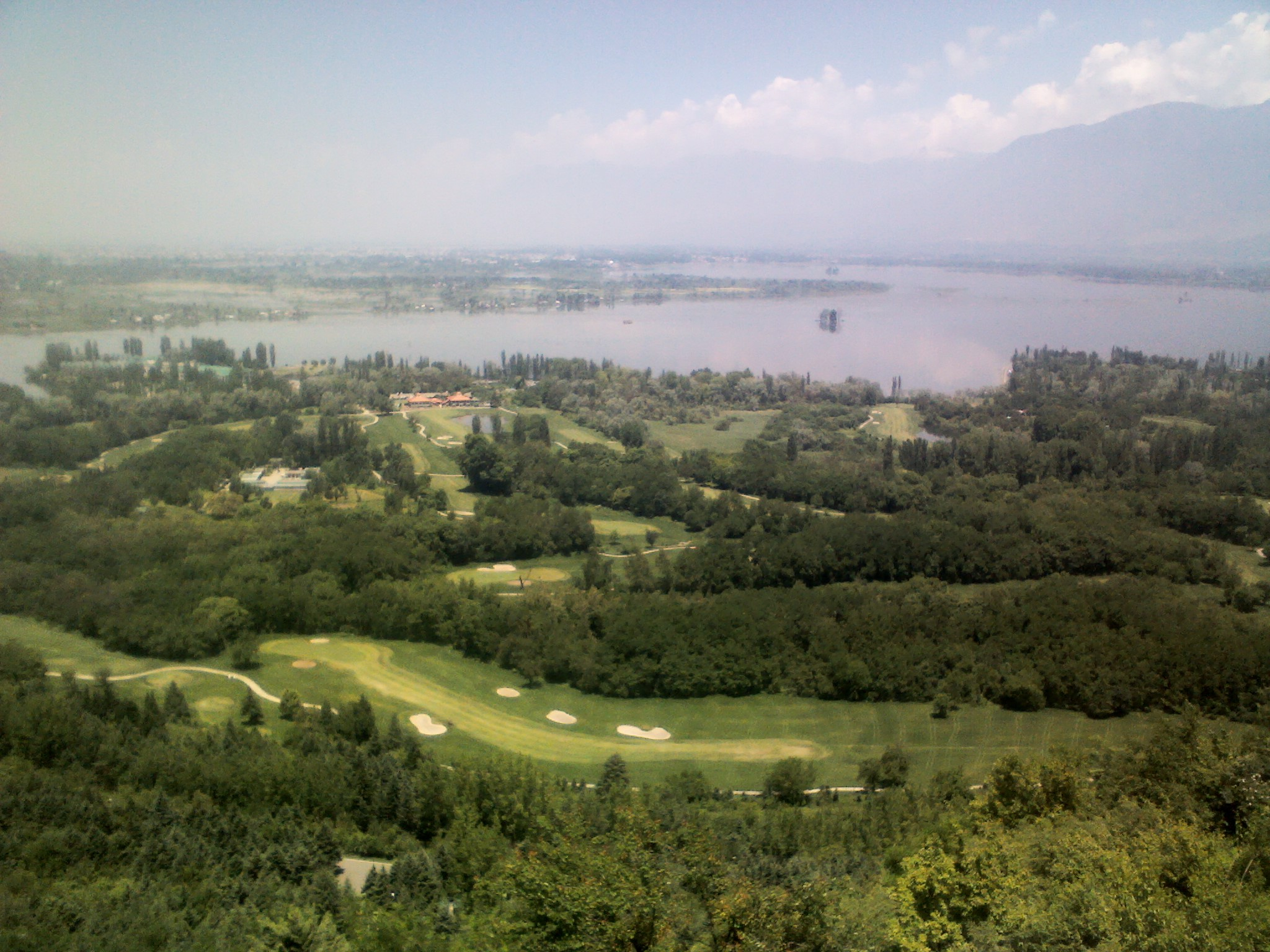
Royal Springs Golf Course, Srinagar

The city is home to the Sher-i-Kashmir Stadium, where international cricket matches have been played. The first international match was played in 1983 in which West Indies defeated India and the last international match was played in 1986 in which Australia defeated India by six wickets. Since then no international matches have been played in the stadium due to the security situation (although the situation has now improved quite considerably). Srinagar has an outdoor stadium namely Bakshi Stadium for hosting football matches. It is named after Bakshi Ghulam Mohammad. The city has a golf course named Royal Springs Golf Course, Srinagar located on the banks of Dal lake, which is considered one of the best golf courses of India. Football is followed by the youth of Srinagar and the TRC Turf Ground is redeveloped for the particular sport in 2015. Srinagar is home to professional football club of I-League, Real Kashmir FC and Downtown Heroes FC of I-League 2. There are certain other sports being played but those are away from the main city like in Pahalgam (Water rafting) and Gulmarg (skiing).

== Notable people ==
- Aabha Hanjura
- Abhay Sopori (1979–present)
- Ali Mohammad Jan (1914–1988)
- Amitabh Mattoo (1962–present)
- Agha Shahid Ali (1949–2001)
- Bakshi Abdur Rashid (1923–1977)
- Bakshi Ghulam Mohammad (1907–1972)
- Bhai Almast (1553–1643)
- Durga Prasad Dhar (1918–1975)
- Farah Pandith (1968–present)
- Farooq Abdullah (1937–present)
- Farooq Kathwari (1944–present)
- Gani Kashmiri (c. 1630–1669)
- Ghulam Rasool Santosh (1929–1997)
- Hina Khan (1987–present)
- Joanna Lumley (1946–present)
- Kunal Khemu (1983–present)
- Lakshman Joo (1907–1991)
- Lalleshwari (c. 1320–1392)
- Madan Mahatta (1932–2014)
- Manohar Kaul (1925–1999)
- Mehrajuddin Wadoo (1984–present)
- Mohammad Abbas Ansari (1936–2022)
- Mohammad Muneem (1983–present)
- Raj Zutshi (1961–present)
- Raj Begum (1927–2016)
- Ram Chandra Kak (1893–1983)
- Rehman Rahi (1925–2023)
- Reshma (1951/1952–2022)
- Rupa Bhawani (c. 1621–1721)
- Samsar Chand Kaul (1883–1977)
- Sandeepa Dhar
- Sanjay Suri (1971–present)
- Shamas Faqir (1843–1901)
- Shehla Rashid (1988–present)
- Tika Lal Taploo (1930–1989)
- Vibha Saraf (1986–present)
- Vidhu Vinod Chopra (1952–present)
- Vikram Misri (1964–present)
- Yasin Malik (1966–present)
- Zareef Ahmad Zareef (1943–present)
- Zinda Kaul (1884–1965)

== See also ==
- Kashmir conflict
- Downtown (Srinagar)
- Kashmir Shaivism
- List of State Protected Monuments in Jammu and Kashmir
- List of colleges in Srinagar
- Lal Chowk
- Karan Nagar

== Bibliography ==
- Bose, Sumantra (2021), Kashmir at the Crossroads: Inside a 21st-Century Conflict, Yale University Press
- Chowdhary, Rekha (2016), Jammu and Kashmir: Politics of Identity and Separatism, Routledge
- Hamdani, Hakim Sameer (2021), The Syncretic Traditions of Islamic Religious Architecture of Kashmir (Early 14th–18th Century), Routledge, ISBN 978-0-367-55009-7
- Hangloo, Rattan Lal (2022), The State in Medieval Kashmir (second ed.), Routledge
- Hewson, Eileen. (2008) Graveyards in Kashmir India. Wem, England: Kabristan Archives. ISBN 978-1906276072
- Kaul, Shonaleeka (2018), The Making of Early Kashmir: Landscape and Identity in the Rajatarangini, Oxford University Press, ISBN 978-0-19-948292-4
- Khan, Mohammad Ishaq (1978), History of Srinagar 1846–1947: A Study in Socio-Cultural Change, Srinagar: Aamir Publications
- Pal, Pratapaditya (2007), The arts of Kashmir, New York: Asia Society
- Rabbani, G. M. (1981), Ancient Kashmir: A Historical Perspective, Srinagar: Gulshan Publishers
- Wani, Muhammad Ashraf; Wani, Aman Ashraf (2023), The Making of Early Kashmir: Intercultural Networks and Identity Formation, Routledge, ISBN 978-1-032-15830-3
- Zutshi, Chitralekha (2003), Languages of Belonging: Islam, Regional Identity, and the Making of Kashmir, Permanent Black
- Zutshi, Chitralekha (2019), Kashmir, Oxford India Short Introductions, Oxford University Press, ISBN 978-0-19-012141-9
