= Raghunath Temple, Srinagar =

Hindu temple in Jammu and Kashmir, India

Coordinates: 34.08568°N 74.80545°E

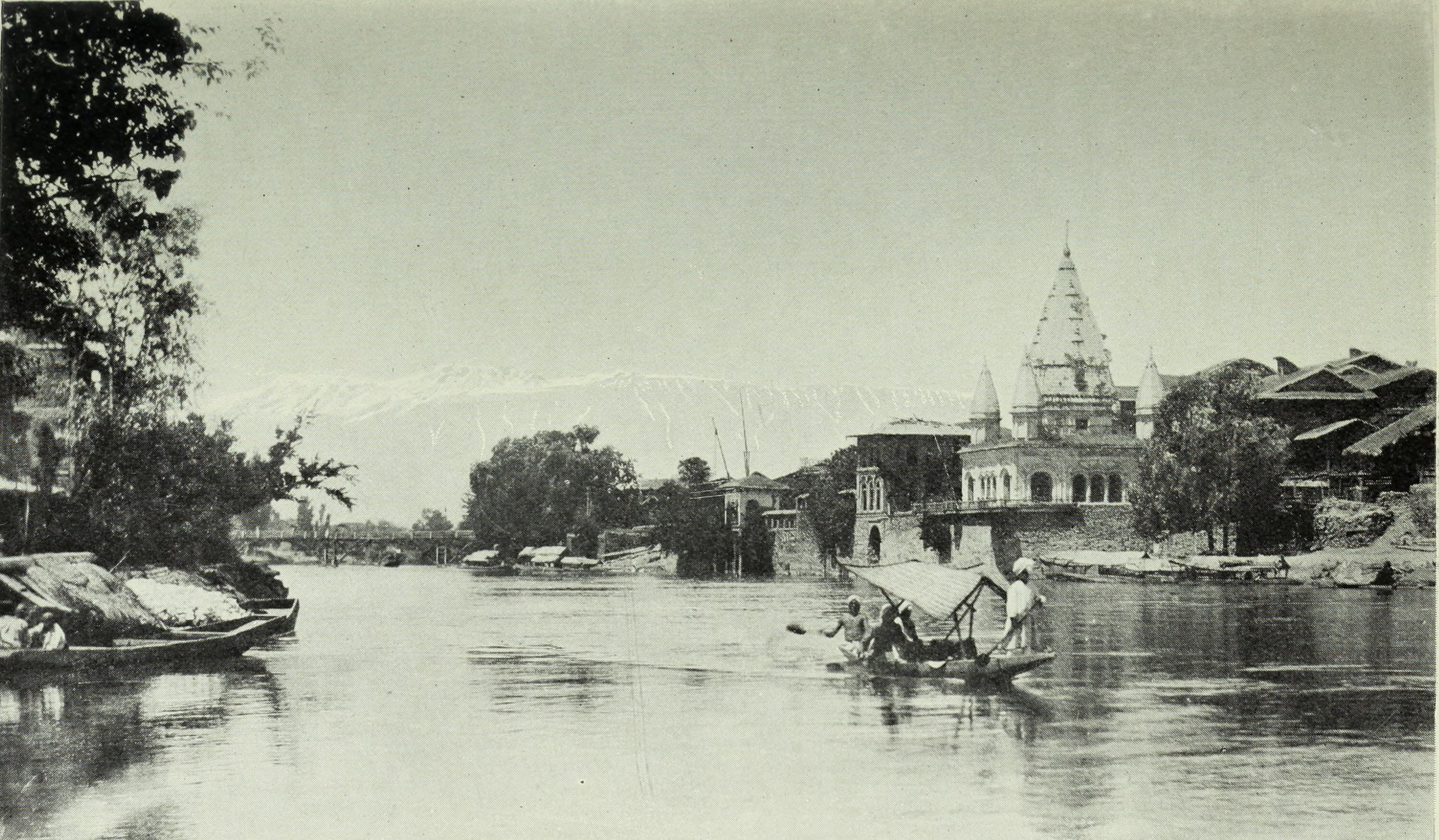
A 1912 photograph of Jhelum river and Raghunath temple in Srinagar.

Raghunath Temple, Srinagar (Urdu pronunciation: [rəɡʱuːnɑːt̪ʰ mənd̪ɪr] ; Kashmiri pronunciation: [rɔɡnaːt̪ʰ mand̪ar]) is a Hindu temple located in Srinagar in the union territory of Jammu and Kashmir. Construction started under Maharaja Gulab Singh in 1835 and was completed in 1860 by Maharaja Ranbir Singh. The temple was attacked and later abandoned following the exodus of Kashmiri Hindus from Kashmir valley. The abandoned temple is being restored.
