= Rattan Lal Hangloo =

Indian academician and historian

Professor Rattan Lal Hangloo
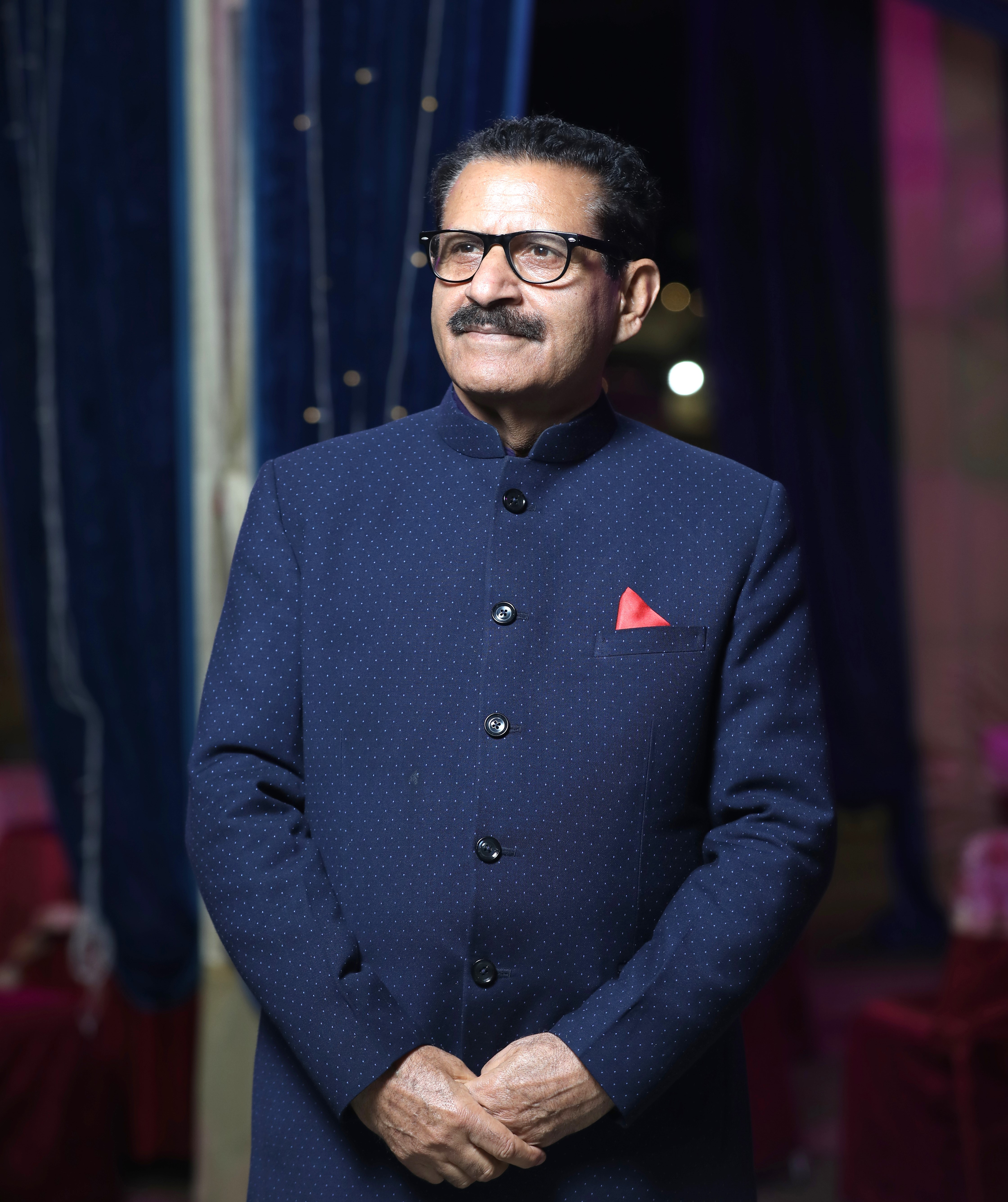
- Born: January 2, 1954 (age 72); Hangalgund, Anantnag District, Jammu and Kashmir, India
- Citizenship: Indian
- Occupation: Professor
- Years active: Vice Chancellor, University of Kalyani (2013 - 2015), Vice Chancellor, University of Allahabad (2015 - 2020) Honorary Vice Chancellor, Noble International University (2020 - till date)
- Spouse: Smt. Sharika Kaul Hangloo
- Children: Arkapratim (son) and Arkaprava (daughter)

Academic background
- Education: University of Kashmir, Jawaharlal Nehru University
- Doctoral advisor: Harbans Mukhia

Academic work
- Discipline: History
- Institutions: University of Hyderabad
- Website: https://rattanlalhangloo.wordpress.com/

Rattan Lal Hangloo (born January 2, 1954) is an Indian historian and academic. He is formerly a professor and the head of the history department at the University of Hyderabad. He served as vice-chancellor of the University of Allahabad and University of Kalyani. Born to a Kashmiri Pandit family in Kashmir, Hangloo completed his postgraduate studies at the University of Kashmir in Srinagar and the Jawaharlal Nehru University in New Delhi. After completing his post-doctoral studies, he worked at the University of Kashmir, the North Eastern Hill University, the University of Hyderabad, and the Central University of Punjab. He also served as a teaching faculty in several other universities outside India. Presently, he is an Honorary Vice Chancellor at Noble International University. He has written a number of books on history and provided his expertise on topics such as the nature of the state, agrarian economy, society and technology, political conflict, and the material culture of Kashmir and other Himalayan communities.

Hangloo is also an Urdu language poet who is additionally fluent in Persian, Sanskrit, Hindi, English, and Kashmiri. The Government of India has bestowed upon him the honorary rank of Colonel in recognition of his outstanding contributions as an academic and administrator.

== Early life and education ==
Rattan Lal Hangloo was born on January 2, 1954, to a Pandit family at Hangalgund village, Anantnag district in Kashmir Valley, India. His mother was Rupa Pandita Hangloo, and his father was Radha Krishna Hangloo. Both of his parents were farmers. He finished his early studies in the Kashmir Valley. He obtained his Bachelor of Arts from the Government Degree College, Anantnag and Master of Arts from the University of Kashmir. In 1978 he then joined the Master of Philosophy course at the Centre for Historical Studies, Jawaharlal Nehru University, New Delhi and completed it in 1979, the title of his thesis was 'History of Agrarian System of Kashmir -1846-1900.' In 1980 he was registered for the Doctor of Philosophy course at the Centre for Historical Studies, Jawaharlal Nehru University, New Delhi and completed it in 1982. His Doctor of Philosophy thesis title was ' History of Rural Economy of Kashmir - 1846-1900.' Following his doctorate in philosophy, he was awarded a Jawaharlal Nehru University post-doctoral fellow at the Centre for Historical Studies. He finished the post-doctoral course in 1982–1983 with a thesis titled 'Indo-Central Asians Relations 1800-1900.

== Career ==
=== Historian ===
After receiving his doctorate in history, Rattan Lal Hangloo worked as an assistant professor in the history department at the University of Kashmir from April 1980 until September 1982. After that, from September 1982 to August 1984, he worked as a visiting fellow at the Centre for Historical Studies, Jawaharlal Nehru University. He relocated to the Northeastern region of India in September 1984, where he served as an assistant professor in the history department at North Eastern Hill University in Shillong, Meghalaya, until December 1988. From January 1989 to July 1998, he was an associate professor in the Department of History, University of Hyderabad. He was appointed Professor in the Department of History at the University of Hyderabad in August 1998, and he retired in January 2019 upon reaching superannuation.

=== Administrative experience ===
Hangloo served as the University of Hyderabad's Dean of Students' Welfare from 2002 to 2005. From 2004 to 2006 and from 2010 to 2012, he was the head of the history department. From 2005 to 2007 he worked for the University of Hyderabad as the Chief Coordinator of the "UGC with Potential for Excellence Program." He then left India to serve in Trinidad and Tobago from 2007 to 2009 as the University of West Indies's Chair of Indian Studies. Following that, he returned to India, he served as Chief Proctor at the University of Hyderabad from 2009 to 2011. From January to June 2010, he was offered the chance to serve as Dean of the Central University of Punjab's School of Social Sciences and Languages while he was still Chief Proctor. He left India once more to work as the ICCR Chair of Contemporary Indian Studies at the Tbilisi State University in Georgia from 2011 to 2012. He returned to India and resumed his work as a professor at the Department of History, University of Hyderabad. From 2013 to 2015, he served as the Vice Chancellor of the University of Kalyani, West Bengal, India. The President of India appointed Hangloo as Vice Chancellor of the University of Allahabad, Uttar Pradesh, India from 2015 to 2020. From 2022 to the present, he has served as a Distinguished Visiting Professor (Social Sciences) at SRM University in Andhra Pradesh, India. Currently, he is working in the Noble International University as an Honorary Vice Chancellor.

== Invited lecture ==
- In September 1997, the President of the Turkmenistan invited Professor Rattan Lal Hangloo to give the First Bairam Khan Memorial Lecture at Maktum Quli University in Ashkabad, Turkmenistan.
- In August 1998, he accepted an invitation from the Gadhar Heritage Foundation of California, USA, to give the First Budh Singh Dillon (Founder of the Gadhar Party in the USA) Memorial Lecture at the famed Gadhar Memorial Hall in San Francisco, California.
- In 1998, he received an invitation to give a lecture on Kashmir in Pre-Modern and Modern Times from the Kashmiri Overseas Association in Washington, D.C.
- In July 1998, he received an invitation from Michigan University's Asian Studies Center to provide a talk on Kashmir and South Asia.
- He delivered a speech on Human Rights, Islam, and Kashmir at the College of William and Mary in Williamsburg, Virginia, in 1998 under invitation from the 14th International Congress of Ethnology and Anthropological Sciences.
- He was invited to give a speech on the study of the urbanization of the Ladakh region in July 2002 at the XIII International Congress of the Economic History Association in Buenos Aires, Argentina.
- He was invited to an international conference in Ashgabat, Turkmenistan, in October 2000 by the Russian Academy of Sciences and the Turkmen Foreign Ministry.
- He was invited to deliver K.P. Jayaswal memorial lecture on 'Periodizing Medieval India' at K.P.Jayaswal Research Institute Patna on 5 December 2010.
- He delivered a lecture on 'Reflections on Kashmir,' a lecture Series: Challenges before Indian Society organized by G.B Pant Social Science Institute, Jhunsi, Prayagraj on July 8, 2019.
- He delivered the first Zind Lal Jalla Memorial Lecture at Ibn-e-Khaldoon Auditorium of the University of Kashmir which was organized by the Department of History, University of Kashmir, in association with the Office Dean, Social Sciences of the varsity on March 30, 2022.

== Awards, Fellowships and honours ==
- Bioved Honorary Fellowship Award 2017 by Bioved Research Institute of Agriculture, Technology & Sciences, Allahabad on 18 February 2017.
- Mother Teresa International Award for Eminent Academician, presented by the Archbishop of Kolkata in 2016.
- Dewang Mehta National Foundation Award for outstanding contribution to Education as the best Vice-Chancellor of the Country, 28 November 2015.
- Chair of Contemporary Indian Studies at Tbilisi State University at Georgia by the Ministry of External Affairs, Government of India (Through Indian Council of Cultural Relations, New Delhi), 2011-2012.
- Visiting Fellowship by Foundation Maison de Sciences Del homme of Paris France, 2010.
- Visiting Chair of Indian Studies, at the University of West Indies, St Augustine campus, Trinidad and Tobago by Indian Council of Cultural Relations, Ministry of External Affairs, Government of India, 2007-2009.
- Fulbright Fellowship by the Fulbright American Studies Institute to participate in the Institute’s Modern South Asia program at the University of Delaware, USA, 2003.
- Visiting Fellowship by Maison de Sciences del Homme of Paris France in 1997.
- DAAD Fellowship by the Federal Republic of Germany to pursue research on the Economic History of India (With special reference to silk route trade) at the South Asian Institute of the Heidelberg University, Germany. in 1997.
- Research Scientist ship by University Grants Commission of India with affiliation to History Centre, Jawaharlal Nehru University, New Delhi, 1984.
- Senior Post-Doctoral Fellowship by the University Grants Commission of India to pursue Post-Doctoral Research on Indo-Central Asian History, 1982 at Centre for Historical Studies, Jawaharlal Nehru University, New Delhi.
- Research Fellowship by Indian Council of Historical Research in 1980 to pursue Ph.D. at Centre for Historical Studies, Jawaharlal Nehru University, New Delhi, India.
- Merit Scholarship by Kashmir University, Srinagar, India to pursue Post-Graduate Studies from 1975-1977.

== Personal life ==
Rattan Lal Hangloo is married to Smt. Sharika Kaul Hangloo and they have two children Arkapratim (son) and Arkaprava (daughter).

== Books ==
- Enquires in Medieval India: Religion, Society, Culture and Polity, Primus publishers, New Delhi, 2022 ISBN 978-93-5572-183-9
- The State in Medieval Kashmir (Second Edition), Routledge Publishers, London, 2021 ISBN 9781032292144
- Kashmir: Before the Accession and After, Primus publishers, New Delhi, 2021 ISBN 978-93-91144-70-8
- Indian Diaspora in the Caribbean: History, Culture and Identity, Primus publishers, New Delhi, 2012 ISBN 978-93-80607-38-2
- History of Science and Technology in India: Exploring new themes, Rawat Publishers, 2011 ISBN 9788131604267
- New Themes in Indian History, Politics, Gender Environment and Culture, Black & White publishers, New Delhi, 2007 ISBN 8189320157
- Approaching Islam, Black & White publishers, New Delhi, 2005 ISBN 8189320092, 9788189320096
- Agrarian System of Kashmir, Commonwealth Publishers, New Delhi, 1995 ISBN 8171693512, 9788171693511
- Situating Medieval Indian State, Commonwealth Publishers, New Delhi, 1995 ISBN 8171693229
