= Madan Mahatta =

Indian photographer

- Died: 6 March 2014

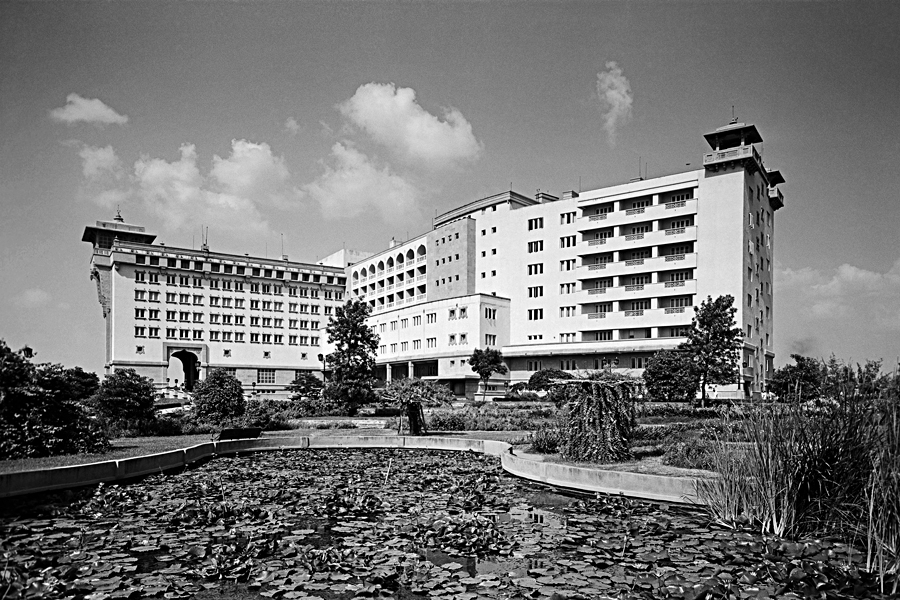
Ashoka Hotel by Madan Mahatta, c. 1957

Madan Mahatta (1932–2014) was an Indian photographer. He was mainly interested in architectural photography. He worked closely with architects including Raj Rewal, Charles Correa, Habib Rahman, and Achyut Kanvinde. Many of his works are in black-and-white. Mahatta died of cancer on 5 March 2014.
