= List of Monuments of National Importance in Jammu and Kashmir =

This is a list of Monuments of National Importance as officially recognized by and available through the website of the Archaeological Survey of India (ASI) in the Indian union territory of Jammu and Kashmir. The monument identifier is a combination of the abbreviation of the subdivision of the list (state, ASI circle) and the numbering as published on the website of the ASI. 56 Monuments of National Importance have been recognized by the ASI in Jammu and Kashmir.

== List of monuments of national importance ==
SL. No.	Description	Location	Address	District	Coordinates	Image
N-JK-1	Ancient site of Chakradhar / Semthan	Semthan		Anantnag	33°48′21″N 75°05′51″E	Ancient site of Chakradhar / Semthan More images
N-JK-2	Mughal Arcade and Spring at Verinag	Verinag		Anantnag	33°32′05″N 75°14′58″E	Mughal Arcade and Spring at Verinag More images
N-JK-3	Martand Sun Temple	Ranbirpura		Anantnag	33°44′43″N 75°13′12″E	Martand Sun Temple More images
N-JK-4	Bumzuva Cave and Temple	Bumzuva		Anantnag	33°46′19″N 75°12′49″E	Bumzuva Cave and Temple More images
N-JK-5	Dattah Mandir	Bandi		Baramulla	34°07′19″N 74°04′39″E	Dattah Mandir More images
N-JK-6	Ancient Temple	Buniyar		Baramulla	34°08′39″N 74°11′21″E	Ancient Temple More images
N-JK-7	Ancient Temple	Fatehgarh		Baramulla	34°10′29″N 74°19′20″E	Ancient Temple More images
N-JK-8	Ancient Stupa (Excavated Remains)	Ushkur		Baramulla	34°11′52″N 74°20′46″E	Ancient Stupa (Excavated Remains) More images
N-JK-9	Partapswami Temple	Tapparwaripor		Baramulla	34°12′10″N 74°30′27″E	Partapswami Temple More images
N-JK-10	Sankaragaurisvara Temple	Pattan		Baramulla	34°09′28″N 74°33′25″E	Sankaragaurisvara Temple More images
N-JK-11	Sugandhesa Temple	Pattan		Baramulla	34°09′11″N 74°33′45″E	Sugandhesa Temple More images
N-JK-12	Ancient Stupa, Chaitya & Monastery	Dever Yakhamanpjor / Parihaspora		Baramulla	34°09′34″N 74°39′10″E	Ancient Stupa, Chaitya & Monastery More images
N-JK-13	Ancient Site	Sumbal		Baramulla	34°13′29″N 74°38′01″E	Upload Photo
N-JK-14	Mosque and other ancient remains on the island	Wular Lake		Baramulla	34°22′06″N 74°37′16″E	Upload Photo
N-JK-15	Khanpur Sarai	Khanpur		Budgam	33°55′13″N 74°49′39″E	Upload Photo
N-JK-16	Fort at Akhnoor	Akhnoor		Jammu	32°53′47″N 74°44′26″E	Fort at Akhnoor More images
N-JK-17	Remains of Ancient sites (Pambaran)	Ambaran		Jammu	32°54′14″N 74°45′48″E	Upload Photo
N-JK-18	Ancient Temple Harihara	Billawar		Kathua	32°36′49″N 75°36′12″E	Upload Photo
N-JK-19	Rock carving of Devi riding a lion	Basohli		Kathua		Upload Photo
N-JK-20	Rock carving of Sitala, Narada, Brahma & Radha Krishna	Basohli		Kathua		Upload Photo
N-JK-21	Vishesvara and other cave Temple	Basohli		Kathua		Upload Photo
N-JK-22	Trilochannanath Temple	Mahadera Basohli		Kathua	32°29′47″N 75°47′58″E	Upload Photo
N-JK-23	Aliabad Sarai	Aliabad		Shopian	33°38′30″N 74°35′00″E	Aliabad Sarai More images
N-JK-24	Avantiswami Temple	Avantipura		Pulwama	33°55′24″N 75°00′46″E	Avantiswami Temple More images
N-JK-25	Avantisvara Temple	Avantipura		Pulwama	33°55′40″N 75°00′16″E	Avantisvara Temple More images
N-JK-26	Hirpur Sarai	Hirpur		Pulwama	33°40′31″N 74°43′22″E	Upload Photo
N-JK-27	Ancient Temple	Kakapora		Pulwama	33°56′49″N 74°55′47″E	Ancient Temple More images
N-JK-28	Monolithic Shrine	Khrew		Pulwama	34°01′12″N 75°00′01″E	Upload Photo
N-JK-29	Remains of Ancient Temple	Khrew		Pulwama	34°01′12″N 74°59′58″E	Upload Photo
N-JK-30	Ancient Temple, Ladhoo	Nagbal, Ladhoo	Ladhoo	Pulwama	33°59′32″N 74°59′37″E	Ancient Temple, Ladhoo More images
N-JK-31	Remains of Ancient Stupa	Malangpora		Pulwama	33°53′27″N 74°58′48″E	Upload Photo
N-JK-32	Remains of Ancient Temple	Pampore		Pulwama	34°01′13″N 74°55′12″E	Upload Photo
N-JK-33	Ancient Siva Temple	Payar		Pulwama	33°51′39″N 74°56′25″E	Ancient Siva Temple More images
N-JK-34	Pathar Masjid	Zaina Kadal		Srinagar	34°05′31″N 74°48′21″E	Pathar Masjid More images
N-JK-35	Ancient Temple	Bohri Kadal		Srinagar	34°05′48″N 74°48′29″E	Upload Photo
N-JK-36	Tomb of Zain-ul-Abudin's mother	Zaina Kadal		Srinagar	34°05′42″N 74°48′22″E	Tomb of Zain-ul-Abudin's mother More images
N-JK-37	Khanqah of Shah Hamadan	Shah Hamdan		Srinagar	34°05′28″N 74°48′28″E	Khanqah of Shah Hamadan More images
N-JK-38	Akhund Mulla Shah's Mosque	Kathi Darwaza		Srinagar	34°06′13″N 74°49′02″E	Akhund Mulla Shah's Mosque More images
N-JK-39	Gates in the Rampart of the fort a) Kathi Darwaza b) Sangeen Darwaza	Kathi Darwaza; Sangen Darwaza		Srinagar	34°06′13″N 74°49′17″E	Gates in the Rampart of the fort a) Kathi Darwaza b) Sangeen Darwaza More images
N-JK-40	Ancient Temple	Hari Parbat		Srinagar	34°06′21″N 74°48′58″E	Ancient Temple More images
N-JK-41	Group of Ancient Temples	Naranag		Ganderbal	34°21′12″N 74°58′38″E	Group of Ancient Temples More images
N-JK-42	Ancient sites & Remains	Burzahom		Srinagar	34°10′11″N 74°52′00″E	Upload Photo
N-JK-43	Ancient Monastery & Stupa	Harwan		Srinagar	34°09′16″N 74°53′51″E	Ancient Monastery & Stupa More images
N-JK-44	Group of arched terraces / structural complex	Pari Mahal		Srinagar	34°05′00″N 74°53′00″E	Group of arched terraces / structural complex More images
N-JK-45	Shankaracharya Temple	Kothi Bagh / Durganag		Srinagar	34°04′44″N 74°50′37″E	Shankaracharya Temple More images
N-JK-46	Ancient Site	Pandrethan		Srinagar	34°03′18″N 74°51′44″E	Upload Photo
N-JK-47	Excavated Remains	Badami Bagh, Pandrethan		Srinagar	34°03′24″N 74°51′41″E	Excavated Remains
N-JK-48	Pandrethan Temple	Pandrethan		Srinagar	34°03′23″N 74°51′39″E	Pandrethan Temple More images
N-JK-49	Ancient Site, Babour	Thalora		Udhampur	32°45′04″N 75°08′30″E	Ancient Site, Babour More images
N-JK-50	Devi Bhagwati Temple, Babour	Thalora		Udhampur	32°45′23″N 75°09′00″E	Devi Bhagwati Temple, Babour More images
N-JK-51	Ancient Temple Dera, Babour	Thalora		Udhampur	32°45′10″N 75°09′00″E	Ancient Temple Dera, Babour More images
N-JK-52	Ancient Temples Kala Dera I & II	Manwal		Udhampur	32°45′14″N 75°08′45″E	Ancient Temples Kala Dera I & II More images
N-JK-53	Ancient Temple, Babour	Manwal		Udhampur	32°45′13″N 75°08′43″E	Upload Photo
N-JK-54	Group of Temples	Kiramchi		Udhampur	32°57′54″N 75°07′10″E	Group of Temples More images
N-JK-55	Ancient Fort attributed to Raja Suchet Singh and Samadhi of Queen of Raja Suchet Singh	Ramnagar		Udhampur	32°48′26″N 75°18′53″E	Ancient Fort attributed to Raja Suchet Singh and Samadhi of Queen of Raja Suchet Singh More images
N-JK-56	Ancient Palaces attributed to Raja Suchet Singh	Ramnagar		Udhampur	32°48′19″N 75°19′06″E	Ancient Palaces attributed to Raja Suchet Singh More images

== See also ==
- List of Monuments of National Importance in India for other Monuments of National Importance in India
- List of State Protected Monuments in Jammu and Kashmir
