= List of cities in Jammu and Kashmir by population =

This is a list of urban agglomerations with a population above 100,000 as per 2011 census in the Indian union territory of Jammu and Kashmir:

== Urban Agglomeration ==
In the census of India 2011, an Urban Agglomeration has been defined as follows:

"An urban agglomeration is a continuous urban spread constituting a town and its adjoining outgrowths (OGs), or two or more physically contiguous towns together with or without outgrowths of such towns. An Urban Agglomeration must consist of at least a statutory town and its total population (i.e. all the constituents put together) should not be less than 20,000 as per the 2001 Census. In varying local conditions, there were similar other combinations which have been treated as urban agglomerations satisfying the basic condition of contiguity."

=== Constituents of Urban Agglomerations in Jammu and Kashmir ===
The constituents of Urban Agglomerations in Jammu and Kashmir, with a population of 1 lakh or above, are noted below:

- Srinagar Urban Agglomeration includes Srinagar (M Corp.), Bagh e Mehtab (OG), Shanker Pora (OG), Machwa(Nasratpora) (OG), Dharam Bagh (OG), Gopal Pora (OG), Wathora (OG), Badamibagh (CB), Pampora (MC) Narbal, Parihaspora and Kral Pora (CT),
- Jammu UA includes Jammu (MC), Kamini (OG), Khanpur (OG), Setani (OG), Narwal Bala (OG), Rakh Bahu (OG), Chhani Raaman (OG), Chhani Beja (OG), Chhani Kamala (OG), Chak Jalu (OG), Sunjawan (OG), Deeli (OG), Gangial (OG), Gadi Garh (OG), Raipur (OG), Rakh Raipur (OG), Chak Gulami (OG), Gujrai (OG), Hazuri Bagh (OG), Muthi (OG), Barnayi (OG), Dharmal (OG), Chanor (OG), Chwadi (OG), Keran (OG), Satwari (OG), Nagrota (CT), Chak Kalu (CT), Rakh Gadi Garh (CT), Bhore (CT), Chhatha (CT), Jammu (CB) and Bari Brahmana (MC).
- Anantnag UA includes Anantnag (M Cl), Rakh Chee (OG), Chee (OG), Mirgund (OG), Takai Bahram Shah (OG), Ghat Pushwari (OG), Bagh Nowgam (OG), Mong hall (OG), Haji Danter (OG), Bona Dialgam (OG), Uttersoo Naji gund (OG), Bug Nowgam (OG), Khirman Dooni pahoo (OG), Dooni Pahoo (OG), Brak Pora (OG), Fateh Garh (OG), Chiti pai Bugh (OG), Shamshi Pora (OG), Batengo (OG), Khandi Pahari (OG), Bagh-i- Sakloo (OG) and Mattan (MC).

Abbreviations: M Corp. = Municipal Corporation, M = Municipality, CT = Census Town, OG = Out Growth, NA = Notified Area, CB = Cantonment Board

== Urban Agglomeration constituents ==
Urban Agglomerations constituents with a population above 100,000 as per 2011 census are shown in the table below.

Urban Agglomeration	Name of Constituent	District	Type*	Population 2011	Male	Female	Population below 5 yrs	Literacy Rate
Srinagar	Srinagar	Srinagar	M Corp	1,192,792	631,916	560,876	148,176	70.98
Jammu	Jammu	Jammu	M C	503,690	265,346	238,344	42,655	89.66
Anantnag	Anantnag	Anantanag	M CL	108,505	56,030	52,475	18,056	78.95
