= Pathar Mosque =

Mosque in Srinagar, Kashmir

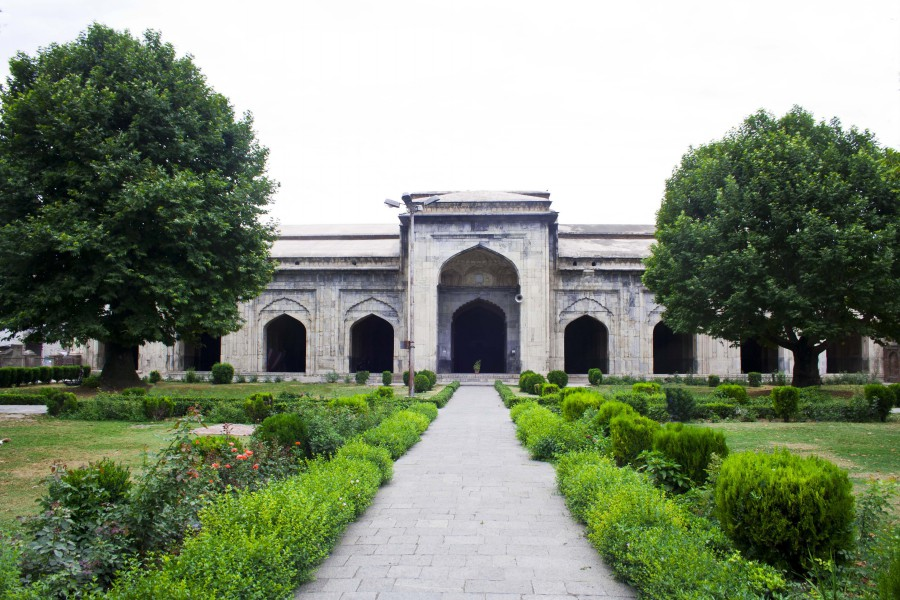
- The mosque façade in 2016

- Location of the mosque in Jammu and Kashmir

Religion
- Affiliation: Islam
- Ecclesiastical or organisational status: Mosque (1620s); Profane use (1630s–1930); Mosque (since 1931)
- Status: Active

Location
- Location: Old Srinagar, Srinagar District, Kashmir Valley, Jammu and Kashmir
- Country: India
- Coordinates: 34°05′31″N 74°48′21″E

Architecture
- Architect: Malik Hyde
- Type: Mosque architecture
- Style: Mughal
- Founder: Noor Jehan
- Completed: 1623

Specifications
- Length: 55 m (180 ft)
- Width: 16 m (51 ft)
- Materials: Stone

Monument of National Importance
- Official name: Pathar Masjid
- Reference no.: N-JK-34

The Pathar Mosque, known locally as Naev Masheed (Kashmiri: / ˈnəw ˌməʃiːd̪ /), is a Mughal era stone mosque located in the old city of Srinagar, in the union territory of Jammu and Kashmir, India. It is located on the left bank of the River Jhelum, just opposite the shrine of Khanqah-e-Mu'alla. The mosque structure is a Monument of National Importance.

== History ==
The mosque was built by Mughal Empress Noor Jehan, the wife of emperor Jehangir, in 1623. Soon after its construction, the mosque was declared unfit for prayers and was used instead for non-religious purposes. The structure was reconverted into a mosque in the early 1930s. (Note: The reconversion happened in the aftermath of communal riots in 1931, though earlier attempts were made in the 1910s.)

== Architecture ==
The mosque has some distinct features that separate it from the rest of the mosques in the Kashmir Valley. Unlike other mosques, it does not have the traditional pyramidal roof. Furthermore, the mosque has nine mehraabs (arches), with the central one being larger than the others.

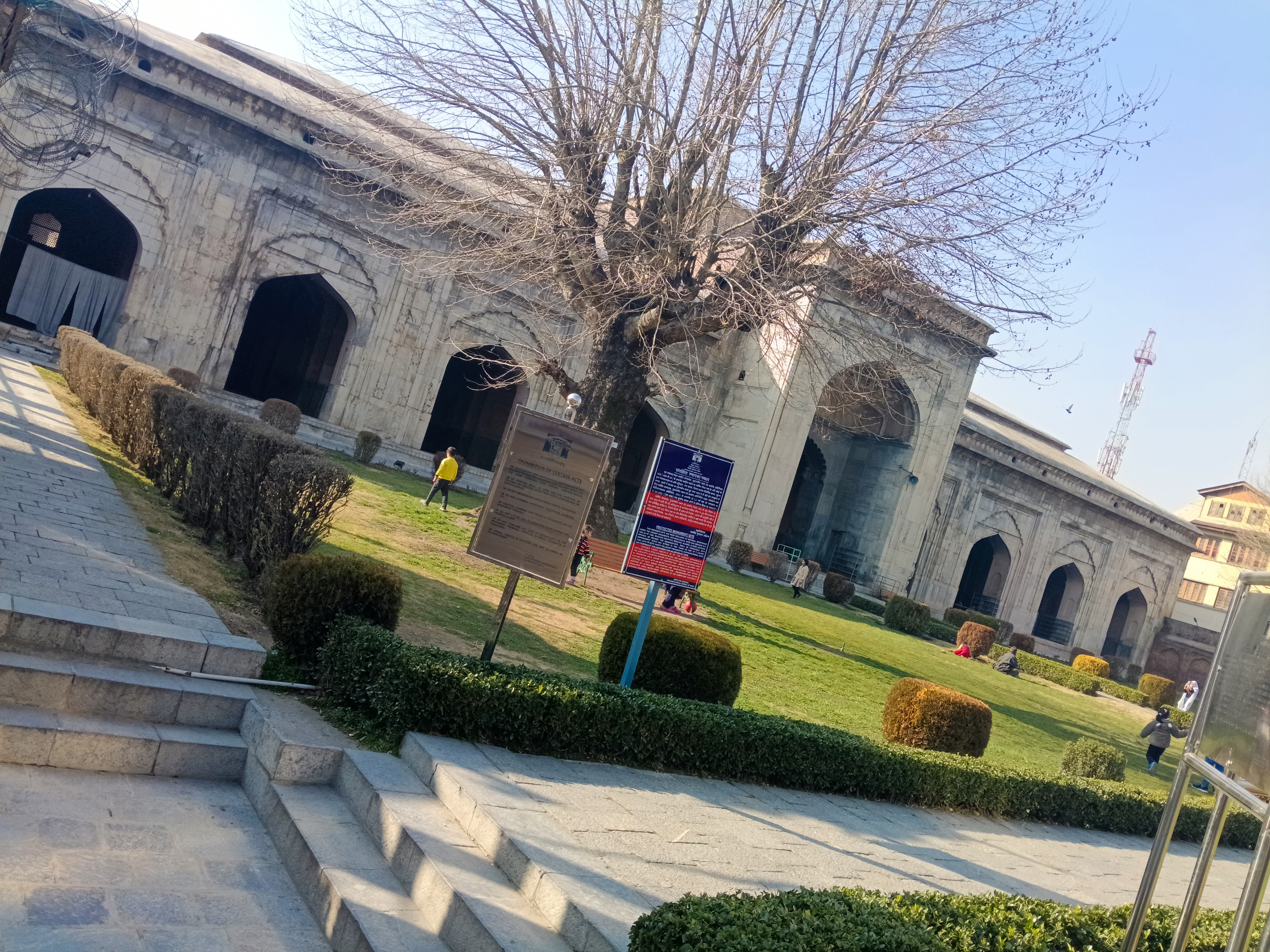
Pathar Masjid Srinagar 🍁

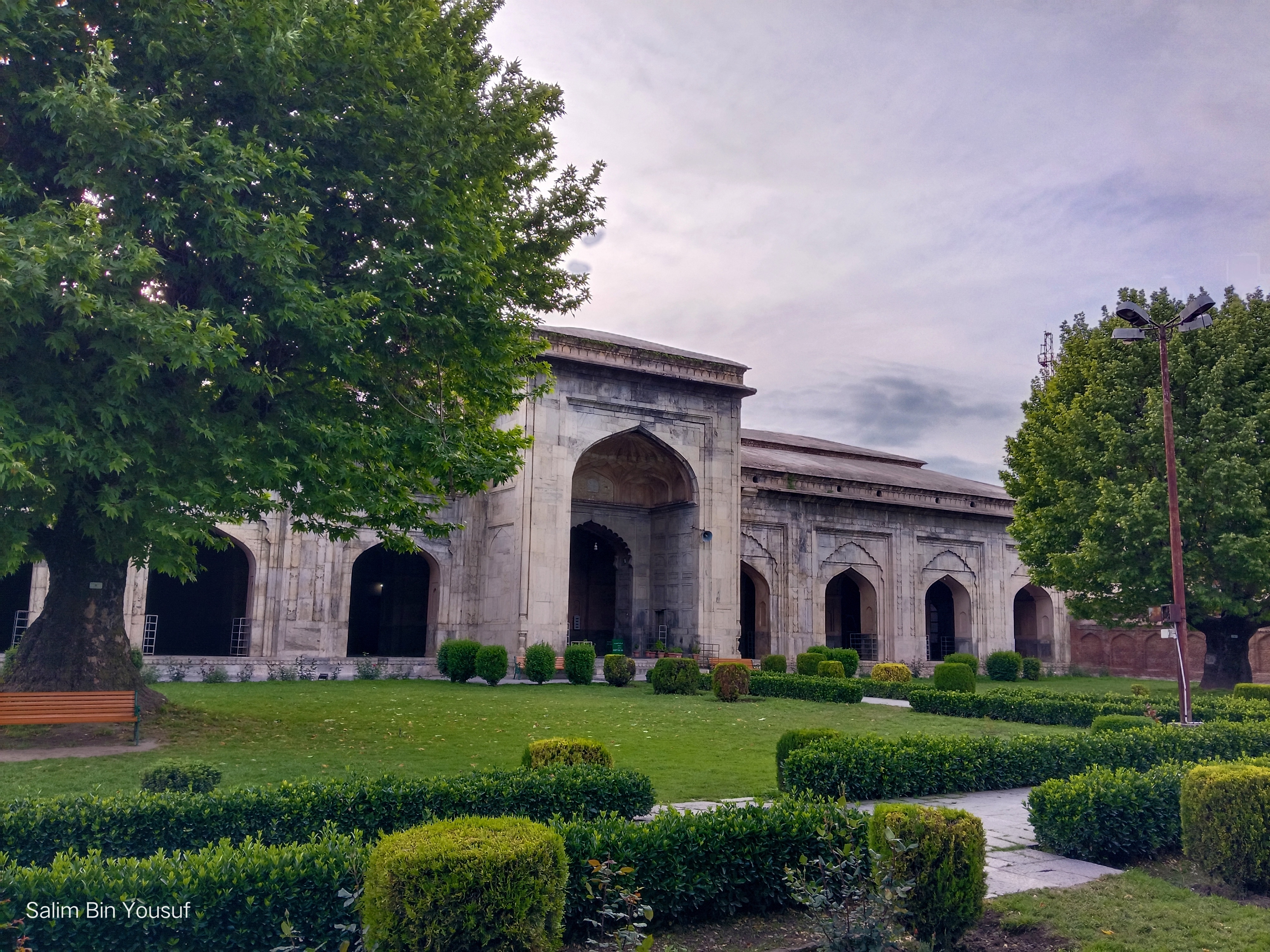
Pathar Masjid Srinagar 🌱

== See also ==
- Islam in India
- List of mosques in India
- List of Monuments of National Importance in Jammu and Kashmir
