= Downtown, Srinagar =

- Location in Jammu and Kashmir Location in India
- Coordinates: 34°5′N 74°47′E
- Country: India
- Union territory: Jammu and Kashmir
- District: Srinagar district
- Settled: Ancient
- Elevation: 1,585 m (5,200 ft)

Languages
  - Official: Kashmiri, Dogri, Urdu, Hindi, English
- Time zone: UTC+5:30 (IST)
- Distance from Delhi: 837.4 kilometres (520.3 mi)
- Distance from Mumbai: 2,192.6 kilometres (1,362.4 mi)

Downtown, popularly known as Shahar-e-Khaas, is the largest and the most densely populated area of the city of Srinagar in the union territory of Jammu and Kashmir, India. The area is mostly located on the banks of Jhelum River about five km (3.1 mi) from city center. The area is considered as the core point in the city as the first inhabitants of the Srinagar lived there. In general, the whole area to the north of city centre Lal Chowk is considered a part of downtown although some areas hold high significance. The Jamia Masjid, Srinagar and many other shrines are located here, which makes it the central spiritual, religious, political and moral center of whole Kashmir.

The historical buildings and monuments found in the area reflect the design of old times. The residential homes are depicted to be constructed from late-19th century to early-20th century. Many key monuments like Jamia Masjid, Khanqah-e-Mu'alla, Maharaj Gunj, Aali Masjid, and shrines have been built by famous rulers of Kashmir.

== History ==
The area was settled more than 2000 years ago in 3rd century BC by Raja Pravarsena. The area is the hub of the historical monuments made by the famous rulers of Kashmir. The historical monuments include Jamia Masjid in Nowhatta, Khanqah-e- Mu'alla in Zana Kadal, Aali Masjid in Eidgah, Maharaj Ganj tomb in Maharaj Ganj, Pathar Masjid in Nawabazar, and Dastgeer Sahib shrine in Khanyar. Moreover, the Roza Bal shrine is also situated in the area.

== Climate ==
Climate data for Downtown, Srinagar
| Month | Jan | Feb | Mar | Apr | May | Jun | Jul | Aug | Sep | Oct | Nov | Dec | Year |
|---|---|---|---|---|---|---|---|---|---|---|---|---|---|
| Mean daily maximum °C (°F) | 8.2 (46.8) | 11.5 (52.7) | 16.3 (61.3) | 21.4 (70.5) | 25.7 (78.3) | 29.6 (85.3) | 31.7 (89.1) | 31.4 (88.5) | 29.1 (84.4) | 24.3 (75.7) | 17.4 (63.3) | 11.3 (52.3) | 21.5 (70.7) |
| Mean daily minimum °C (°F) | −1.2 (29.8) | 1.3 (34.3) | 5.2 (41.4) | 8.7 (47.7) | 12.8 (55.0) | 16.5 (61.7) | 20.1 (68.2) | 19.7 (67.5) | 15.6 (60.1) | 7.5 (45.5) | 2.8 (37.0) | −1.0 (30.2) | 9.0 (48.2) |
Source: India Meteorological Department

=== 2014 flood ===
In September 2014 the Indian union territory of Jammu and Kashmir was hit by floods caused by torrential rainfall. The area of Downtown was least affected as compared to the rest of Srinagar, though close to the river, the people from other parts of Srinagar shifted to downtown for safety. Commercial buildings and residential homes and Government offices were shattered to nothing in the adjoining areas. People lost their lives and properties and the whole area was set on the economic back-foot. Schools, hospitals and other places of significant importance were damaged by the floods.

== Geography ==
The area is located at 34.0833°N 74.7833°E at an elevation of 1585 meters above mean sea level in Srinagar.

== Demographics ==
Kashmiri is the mother tongue of the people in the area. People also use Urdu, Arabic, Hindi and English as secondary languages. It is estimated that the downtown has the population of half a million which is about 47% of the total population of Srinagar district.

== Education ==
There are a number of school and colleges in downtown Srinagar, including Islamia College of Science and Commerce, Women's College and Gandhi Memorial College.

== Sub divisions ==
The areas which comprising Downtown Srinagar include:

| S.No | Name |
|---|---|
| 1 | Navyut |
| 2 | Raze Kadal |
| 3 | Göjwör |
| 4 | Kawdör |
| 5 | Saraf Kadal |
| 6 | Buhri Kadal |
| 7 | Nov Kadal |
| 8 | Naid Kadal |
| 9 | Safa Kadal |
| 10 | Khanyar |
| 11 | Seki Dafar |
| 12 | Ael Kadal |
| 13 | Habba Kadal |
| 14 | Fateh Kadal |
| 15 | Kani Kadal |
| 16 | Kaed Kadal |
| 17 | Dumb Kadal |
| 18 | Watal Kadal |
| 19 | Nawab Bazaar |
| 20 | Maharaj Gunj |
| 21 | Zaena Kadal |
| 22 | Khanqah-e-Mohalla |
| 23 | Gratabal |
| 24 | Tarabal |
| 25 | Braripoor |
| 26 | Bul bul lankar |
| 27 | Narparistan |
| 28 | Khoji Baazar |
| 29 | Roonwor |
| 30 | Bab Demb |
| 31 | Zaldagar |
| 32 | Malarath |
| 33 | Lal Bazaar |
| 34 | Narwor |
| 35 | Hawal |
| 36 | Eidgah |
| 37 | Noor bagh |
| 38 | Hazratbal |
| 39 | Zadibal |

== See also ==
- Soura
- Buchpora
- Shalimar
