= Amarnath land transfer controversy =

On 26 May 2008, the government of India and the state Government of Jammu and Kashmir reached an agreement to transfer 99 acres (0.40 km^{2}) of forest land to the Shri Amarnathji Shrine Board (SASB) in the main Kashmir Valley to set up temporary shelters and facilities for Hindu pilgrims to Amarnath Temple. This caused a controversy, with demonstrations from the Kashmir valley against the land transfer and protests from the Jammu region supporting it. The largest demonstration saw more than 500,000 protesters at a single rally, among the largest in Kashmir's history.

== Kashmir protests ==
Six people were killed and 100 injured when police fired into a crowd in Srinagar protesting the transfer of forest land. Separatist JKLF (R) headed by Farooq Siddiqi ( Farooq Papa) organised a march to the controversial land in Baltal. Senior separatist leaders Shabir Ahmad Shah, Syed Ali Shah Geelani and Mirwaiz Omar Farooq, leaders of the All Parties Hurriyat Conference (APHC), which planned the protests, were placed under house arrest. Throughout the Srinagar area, most public buildings, including schools and government offices, and many businesses, have remained closed.

=== Environmental concerns ===
Initial opposition to the land transfer was based on environmental concerns. Some environmentalists argued that the land transfer would hamper the region's delicate ecological balance.

Reports that the SASB was planning to construct dams across the river Indus to generate electricity for the shrine were unconfirmed.

=== Government response ===
The state government accepted the demands of the protesters from the Kashmir valley region by revoking the land transfer decision on 1 July 2008. Hindu groups in the Jammu division reacted by mounting their own counter-protests against the revocation and called for the cancellation of the revocation decision.

=== Political turmoil ===
As the Kashmiri protests grew wider and more violent, the People's Democratic Party (PDP) said that it would withdraw support to the Indian National Congress (INC)-led state government if it did not revoke the land transfer agreement. Though the land transfer was revoked (after the PDP withdrew its support), the crisis deepened further when the PDP did not lend support to the state government even after the revocation. Meanwhile, the Gulam Nabi Azad's minority government decided to step-down on 7 July 2008.

The protests, however, took a more political tone as state elections were scheduled to be held later in 2008. With elections already due in the state, Omar Abdullah played down the incident and said that PDP's decision to withdraw was not a major constitutional crisis.

== Jammu protests ==
In Jammu, mass protests erupted against the government's decision to revoke the land transfer. The Hindus of the Jammu division generally supported the land transfer, and threatened to shut down the Division on 26 June 2008. 20 kilometres away, in Nagrota, Bharatiya Janata Party (BJP) supporters blocked a highway It has been joined by 35 other organisations, under the banner of Amarnath Shrine Sangharsh Samiti, that have two main demands: that of recalling Governor NN Vohra and the restoration of land to the Shrine Board. Hindu groups such as the Bajrang Dal and the Vishwa Hindu Parishad (VHP) protested in front of Kashmir House in Delhi in support of the land transfer. The situation in Jammu suddenly deteriorated after Kuldeep Raj committed suicide on 23 July and his body was mishandled and dishonoured by the police. Slowly, protests spread to other parts of Jammu. A curfew was imposed in many districts. Protesters claimed that an economic blockade of the Kashmir Valley was being imposed by stopping traffic on the Jammu–Srinagar National Highway. The "economic blockade" theory was however fiercely contested, with the Government of India, the Army, the District Administration, SASB maintaining that there was no blockade. BJP called the blockade "a lie perpetuated by the ISI", of which there was no compelling evidence, and maintained the people of the Valley were being misled with a false propaganda, aiding the designs of separatists. One person was killed and another injured on 6 August 2008 when the Army fired to disperse a violent mob, which blocked the Jammu-Pathankot Highway in Kathua district. Two protesters were killed and eight injured as police opened fire to quell a mob in Samba district on 1 August 2008 Conversely there were also Muslims who, backed by the local Muslim federation and the Muslim Gujjar community, who supported the demands of the Hindus of Jammu.

Shri Amarnath Yatra Sangharsh Samiti convener Leela Karan Sharma said on 6 August 2008 that nothing short of revocation of the land transfer to Amarnath Shrine Board would be acceptable. He opined that the state government was responsible for flaring religious sentiments by allowing construction of the Muslim Jama Masjid at Baltal, yet not allowing a temporary structure for the benefit of Hindu yatris.

=== Government response ===
Despite the protests, the state government has not annulled the revocation decision. Central Government moved hundreds of security forces into the region. Indian authorities restored the Amarnath pilgrimage route after a brief disruption. Opposition party BJP spokesperson Prakash Javadekar said on 2 August 2008 that "It seems the Centre only understands the voices of the valley and not of the Jammu region. It is trying to find a solution through force and is not initiating a dialogue". The prime minister Manmohan Singh spoke to BJP president Rajnath Singh and sought his party's help in finding a solution to the issue.

== Fruit growers' protests ==
Kashmir Fruit Growers Association gave a 24-hour ultimatum to the government failing which they would start agitation for the opening of Muzaffarabad Road for export. "We will export our products to various Indian states via Muzaffarabad and Wagah border", said president of the association. The Indian government alleges that the claims of an economic blockade were fabricated by the Hurriyat and the Inter-Services Intelligence to provoke locals into joining the pro-independence protests. The Ex-Indian Home Minister Shivraj Patil, appealed to the fruit growers to call off their protests. He offered to buy all their fruit and also to pay compensation to those whose fruit has perished.

=== Party wise stand ===
Congress Working Committee spokesperson, Veerappa Moily, said "Providing makeshift and temporary accommodation for yatris and pilgrims all over the country is not a new phenomenon... the authorities spend a lot of money in providing temporary facilities during Kumbh Mela, Puri rath yatra festival" and said that it was absurd to suggest all such temporary shelters could be made permanent. Moily said that the Hurriyat factions and other separatist groups had exploited the mood during the turmoil to revive their "diabolic agenda". He said that playing mischief, Hurriyat had spread rumours that the highways from the Valley to the plains had been blocked stopping movement of goods and essential commodities. Making use of this false propaganda, they organised the march to Muzaffarabad to seek market for the fruit, Moily said.

Ignoring the Indian government's curfew orders, People's Democratic Party and Kashmiri separatist leaders backed the local fruit growers.

=== Government position ===
Claiming that there is no blockade along the Srinagar-Jammu highway, the ministry said as many as 236 trucks and tankers carrying oil, gas, sheep, medicines and poultry products crossed the Jawahar Tunnel from the Jammu side early on Wednesday morning. Of these, 82 trucks and tankers had reached Srinagar by afternoon, it said. Referring to the stranded trucks in the Valley, an official said a fleet of them actually belonged to one individual close to the Hurriyat. The transporter refused to move his vehicles towards Jammu despite the promise of full security cover along the route. The Kashmiri media, however, reported shortages of food, drugs, and other essential supplies in the Kashmir Valley as a result of the alleged blockade and consequently prices of essential commodities increased substantially in the Valley.

=== March to the LOC ===
On 11 August 2008, 50,000 to 2,50,000 Kashmiri protesters attempted to cross the LoC to Muzaffarabad, in violation of march ban orders. Despite intelligence warnings that the LoC march would gather tens of thousands of supporters, the State government and top police officials failed to act immediately and refused to impose a curfew. In the event, small groups of police personnel were left to hold back the marchers.

=== 11 August violence ===
Fifteen people were killed and hundreds more injured when police and paramilitary forces opened fire on protesters attempting to cross the LoC. All Parties Hurriyat Conference (APHC) leader Sheikh Abdul Aziz, a moderate separatist, was among those killed on 11 August. Police say several of their personnel were injured from stones thrown by the protesters.

=== 12 August violence ===
Following the death of the APHC separatist leader Sheikh Abdul Aziz and others during the police firing on 11 August, the separatists in Kashmir region organized protests. Fifteen Kashmiri civilians were killed in the firing by Kashmir police and paramilitary forces. More than 100 people were also injured in a twelve separate incidents of police firing across the Kashmir valley region. Six protesters were killed in Srinagar police firing. In Lasjan, on the outskirts of Srinagar, four were killed after police forces opened fire on a protest led by former government minister Javed Mustafa Mir. Police sources claim that the service weapon of one of Mir's personal security guards "accidentally" went off, injuring seven Central Reserve Police Force (CRPF) troopers, and provoking the retaliatory firing that left four protesters dead. However, local villagers claimed that the CRPF forces opened fire on the protesters first, killing two, then opening once more when others went to help the injured, killing two women in the process. Three protesters, including a woman, were killed in firing at Paribal by the Indian Army. The army spokesperson for the 15 Corps said that the protesters were throwing stones at a military picket, and refused to disperse despite repeated appeals. Another protester was reportedly killed in Anantnag. In Kishtwar, communal clashes broke out after Kashmiri Muslims began protesting the death of Sheikh Abdul Aziz. Muslim and Hindu owned homes and businesses were torched, and two protesters, including a 12-year-old boy, were killed in the rioting. The burial of Sheikh Aziz, held in the Martyrs Graveyard in Srinagar, passed without incident.

=== 14 August Jammu death ===
In Jammu, a man named Balwant Raj Sharma poisoned himself. He donated all his property to Shree Amarnath Sangharsh Samiti.

=== 20 August protests in Jammu and Kashmir ===
The peaceful demonstrations in this otherwise bustling Jammu city was in stark contrast to the high decibel protests in Srinagar. While in Jammu, women walked silently with candles in their hands demanding restoration of forestland to Shri Amarnath Shrine Board (SASB), in Srinagar, they joined their protesting men against years of perceived injustices. Shri Aamarnath Yatra Sangarsh Samiti spearheading the agitation in Jammu, called for civil disobedience On the third and final day of the "Jail Bharo Andolan" of Shri Amarnath Yatra Sangharsh Samiti (SAYSS), over 2,00,000 protesters, including thousands of children, courted arrest in the Jammu region on 20 August 2008 .In the violent protests and clashes between the protesters and security forces, which continued till late evening, one person was killed while over 60 people, including six police personnel, sustained injuries.

Meanwhile, National Security Adviser M.K. Narayanan reviewed the security and political situation in Jammu and Kashmir at a meeting with Governor N.N. Vohra. The government has also pushed Track-II activists into a dialogue process with the separatists even as a four-member panel was scheduled to talk with the Shri Amarnath Sangarsh Samiti.

== End to SASB agitation ==
On 31 August 2008, the 61-day-old agitation in the Jammu region over the Amarnath land row ended following the signing of an agreement between the group leading the agitation and the Jammu and Kashmir Governor-appointed panel. Under the terms of the agreement the shrine board would be making temporary use of 40-hectares of land during the relevant yatra period. The SASB convenor Leela Karan Sharma said, "We have suspended the agitation for the time being, though not called it off, as some of our demands are yet to be met."

== Reactions ==
=== Domestic ===
- Analysts have said that the environmental and political furore in the region is baseless as the government has not allotted land to SASB, nor has land been demarcated for this purpose.
- Government agencies also claimed that the land being considered for the transfer to SASB was barren and inhospitable and the political agenda of the groups opposing the land transfer was obvious.
- News agencies such as Times of India claimed that PDP's stance on the land transfer issue is a "political gimmick" as the current Forest Minister of Jammu and Kashmir, Qazi Afzal, and his predecessor are both from PDP and the proposal to transfer the land to SASB was examined by the state's forest department, law ministry and Supreme Court of India before being approved.
- Awami National Conference, alleged that political parties in Jammu and Kashmir were using the issue to divide the state on communal lines so as to gain political mileage.
- Jammu and Kashmir Chief Minister remarked that "things were blown out of proportion" and "the parties are playing politics over the Amarnath land row".
- Omar Abdullah, Jammu and Kashmir National Conference leader, accused the PDP of hypocrisy over the issue as PDP's minister was a part of the government that took the decision to transfer land to SASB. He also described the protests in the Kashmir region as "Kashmiri nationalism" and added that "[Kashmiri] people aren't against the Amarnath Yatra – they are only protesting against the land transfer which is pure nationalism" he also added "India calls itself the world's largest functioning democracy. But if we are really a democracy, can't we let people express their dissent?" .

=== Party To dispute ===
On Wednesday 6 August 2008 the Pakistani Senate unanimously passed a resolution on the matter. The resolution expressed concerns over attacks on Muslims and their properties by Hindus.

- In response the Indian Foreign Ministry said, "We have seen reports in the Pakistani media that the Senate of Pakistan has passed a resolution about the situation in J & K. Such a resolution amounts to gross interference in our internal affairs. The Senate should attend to issues where it has a locus standi."
