= Akhund Mullah Shah Mosque =

Mosque in Srinagar, Jammu and Kashmir, India

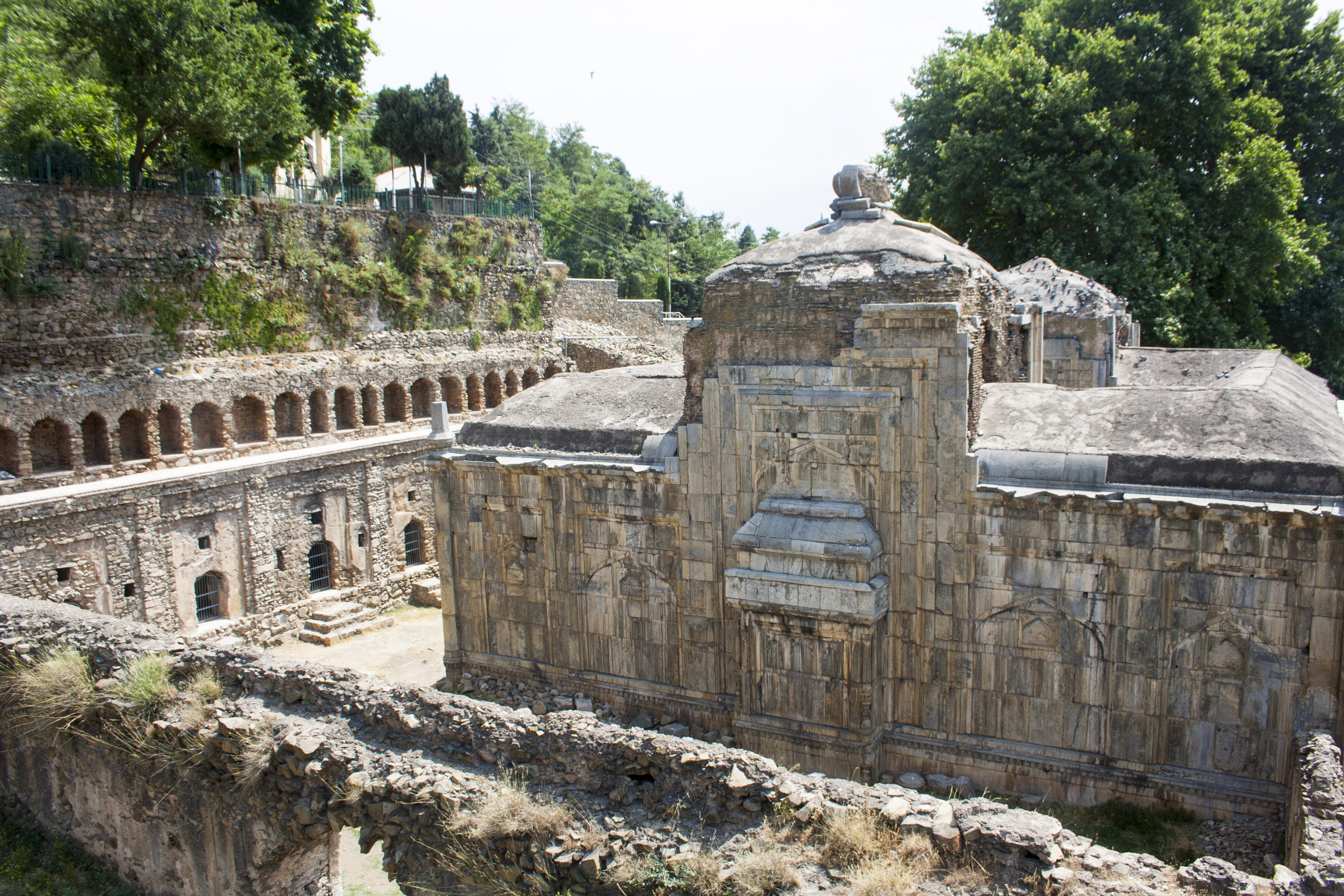
- Ruins of the former mosque in 2016

- Location of the former mosque in Jammu and Kashmir

Religion
- Affiliation: Islam (former)
- Ecclesiastical or organizational status: Mosque (former)
- Status: Inactive; (partial ruinous state)

Location
- Location: Srinagar, Srinagar District, Kashmir Valley, Jammu and Kashmir
- Country: India
- Interactive map of Akhund Mullah Shah Mosque
- Coordinates: 34°06′13″N 74°49′02″E

Architecture
- Type: Mosque architecture
- Style: Mughal
- Founder: Dara Shikoh
- Completed: 1649; 377 years ago

Specifications
- Dome: Three (maybe more)
- Materials: Grey limestone

Monument of National Importance
- Official name: Akhund Mulla Shah's Mosque
- Reference no.: N-JK-38

The Akhund Mullah Shah Masjid, also known as the Akhoon Mullah Masjid, the Dara Shikoh Masjid, and the Mala Shah Mashid, is a former mosque, now in partial ruins, located in Kashmiri, Srinagar, in the Srinagar District, Kashmir Valley, in the union territory of Jammu and Kashmir, India. The former mosque structure is a Monument of National Importance.

The mosque was built by Dara Shikoh in 1649 for his spiritual mentor and is a mosque inside a mosque. The prime sanctuary is entirely separated from the main building through a courtyard that surrounds it. There is a stone lotus that crowns the podium of the mosque.

== Gallery ==
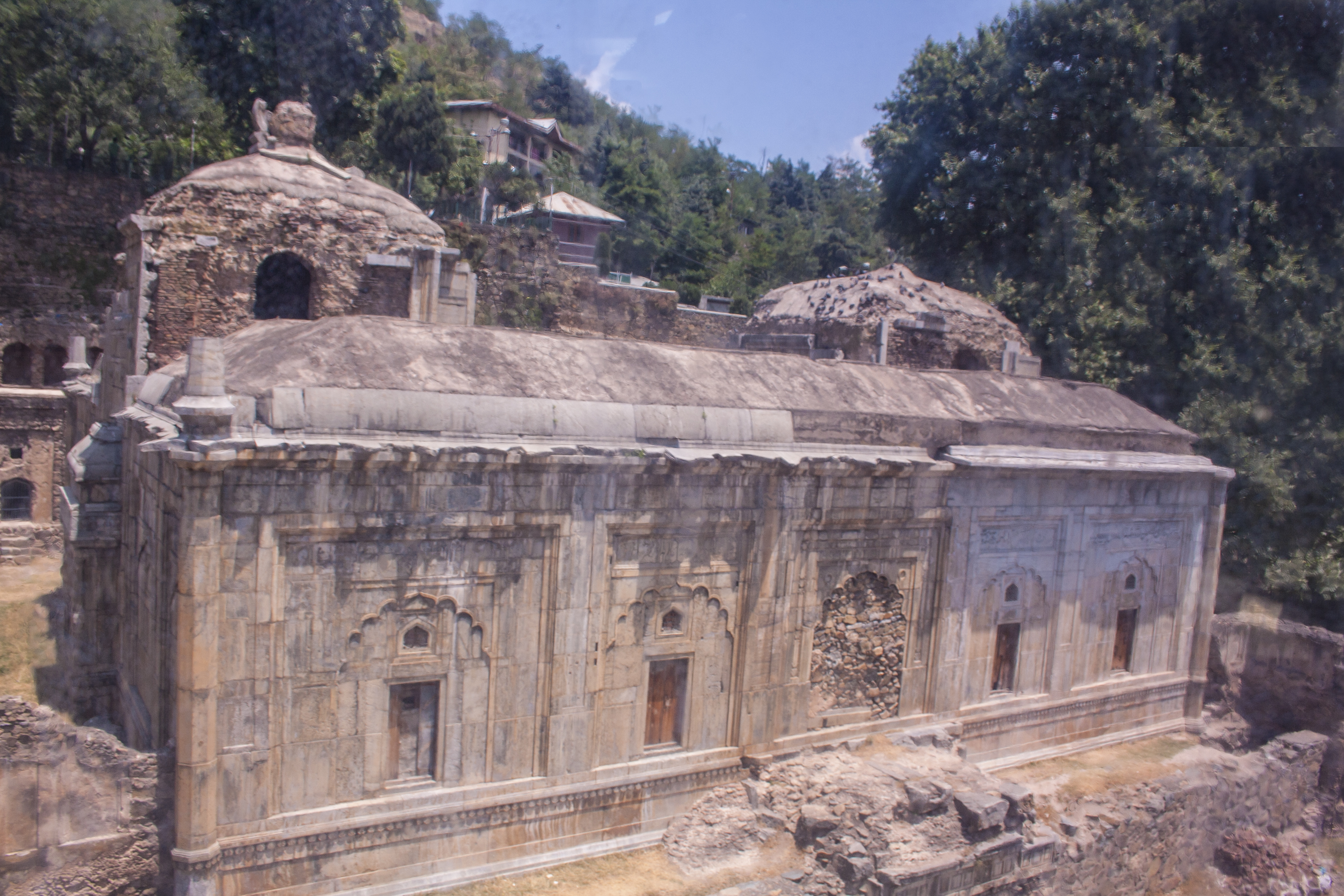
Mosque remnants in 2016

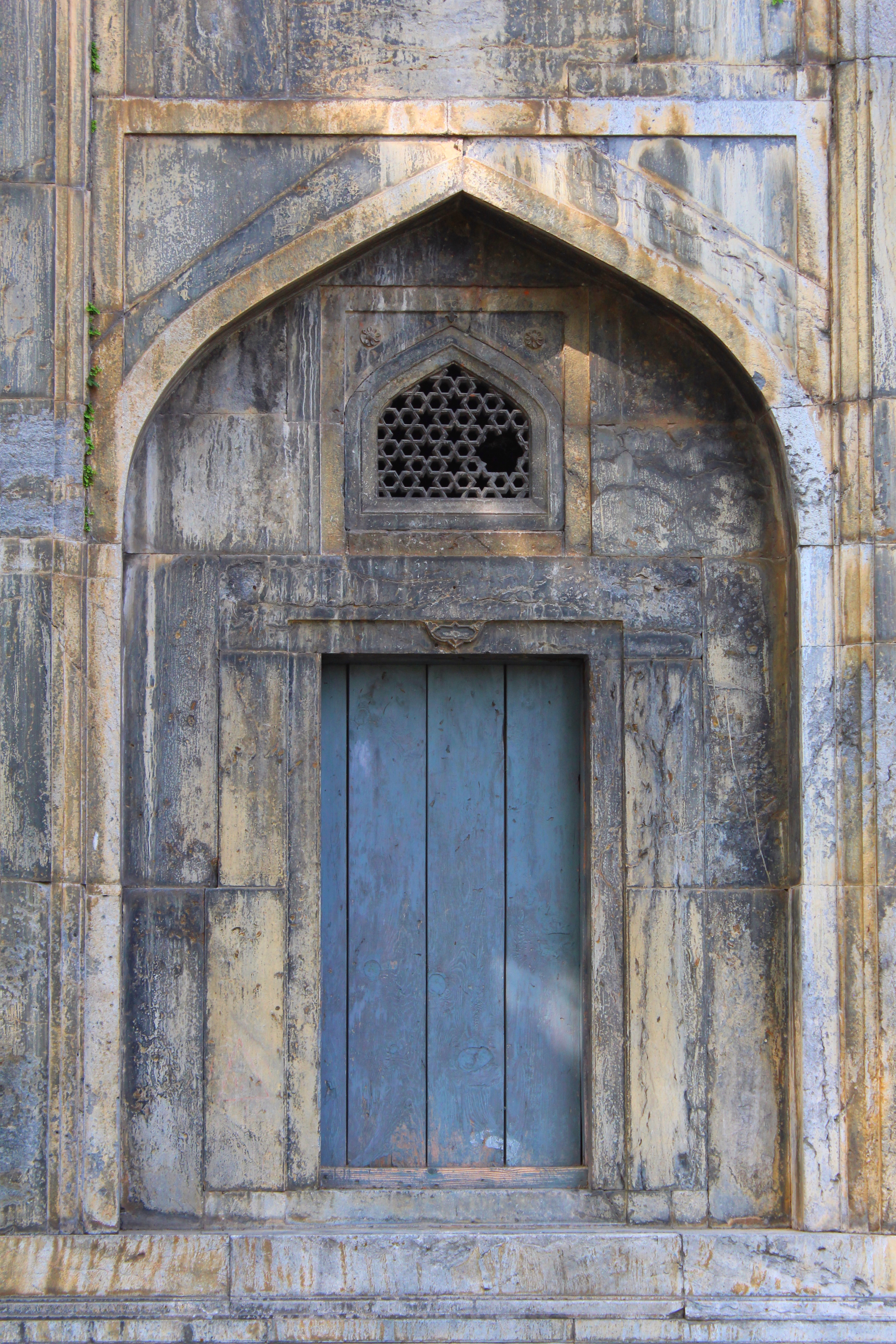
Window with Jaali work and floral motifs

== See also ==
- Islam in India
- List of mosques in India
- List of Monuments of National Importance in Jammu and Kashmir
