= Lasjan =

City In Srinagar, India

Coordinates: 34°03′N 74°52′E

Lasjan is developing area situated in Srinagar (south) tehsil and 07.23 kilometres (4.49 mi) located in Srinagar district of Jammu and Kashmir, India. It is one of 6 cities in Srinagar (south) block along with mohallas like Nowgam and Bagh e Mehtab. Nearby cities include Lasjan Padshai Bagh, 06.10 kilometres (3.79 mi) and Jawahar nagar 05.11 kilometres (3.18 mi) from Lal Chowk Srinagar. It is an industrial area as there are many hot mix plants, stone crusher and brick kiln.

== Economy ==
Most of the local population work as employees, craftsmen and labourers for Indian army in the adjacent Badami Bagh cantonment. Other sources of income include extraction of sand from river Jehlum, rice cultivation and growing timber of various types.

== Floods ==
Due to very low elevation of Lasjan compared to the rest of valley, it is frequently affected by floods of river Jehlum, mostly in autumn (August to September). In 2014, the area was submerged up to two floors causing collapse of some houses (especially old ones made from mud) and walls as well as loss of property in the village.

== Landmarks ==
Lasjan is house to a large number of meadows, brick kilns and stone crushers. However, the latter have caused an increase of SPM in the air of this area. The meadow areas are also shrinking due to nearby landlords occupying them initially as farms and gradually as construction sites for houses and shops. The tombs of Baba Syed Farid and Syed Ishaq Mantaqi al-Hamadani are also located here and Muslims of the Barelvi sect celebrate their urs in the last week of December.
