= Akhnoor Fort =

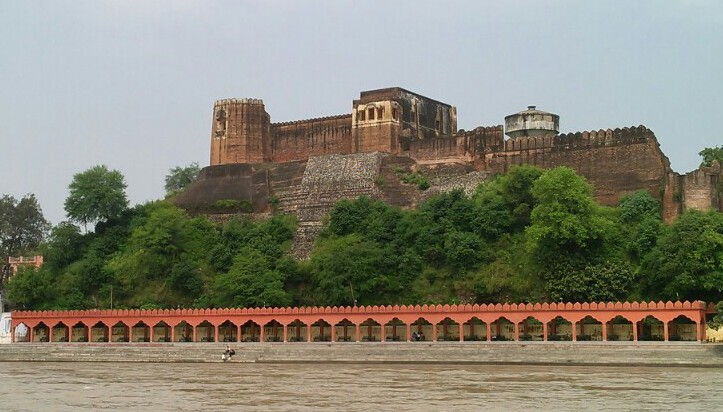

- Location in Jammu and Kashmir, India Akhnoor Fort (India)
- 32.8963°N 74.7407°E
- Location: Akhnoor, Jammu district, Jammu and Kashmir, India

History
- Built: 1762–1802

Site notes
- Architectural style: Indian fort architecture

Akhnoor Fort is a fort on the right bank of the Chenab River (ancient name Asikni), 28 km from Jammu City.

Construction of the fort was started by Raja Tej Singh in 1762 CE and completed by his successor Raja Dhian Singh in 1802. On 17 June 1822, Maharaja Ranjit Singh crowned Maharaja Gulab Singh at the fort's Jia Pota ghat on Chenab's riverbank.

The fort has high fortification walls with bastions at regular intervals and is crowned with battlements. There are two-storeyed watch-towers at the corners, which are crowned by battlements and merlons. The fort has two parts which are bifurcated by a wall with a gate leading to the palace on the southern side. The palace is two-storeyed, and the walls facing the courtyard have decorated arches, some of which contain mural paintings.

Access to Akhnoor Fort is obtained through both the riversides and the northern side. Formerly, a large part of the fort was in ruins; conservation work is in progress.

The fort was declared a National Monument in 1982 under the Ancient Monuments and Archaeological Sites and Remains Act, 1958 and is under the Archaeological Survey of India’s jurisdiction.

== History ==
The Akhnoor Fort has a history of over 5000 years, and was perched upon an ancient site, locally known as Manda, which has been subjected to a limited excavation, which in turn has exposed a threefold sequence of culture.

- Period I is represented by Harappan red and grey pottery consisting of jars, dish-on-stand beakers and goblets, along with other objects, including copper pins, bone arrowheads, terracotta cakes and sherds with Harappan graffiti.
- Period II is marked by the presence of early historic pottery.
- Period III is represented by Kushana objects and impressive walls of rubble diaper masonry flanked on both sides by a 3-metre-wide street.
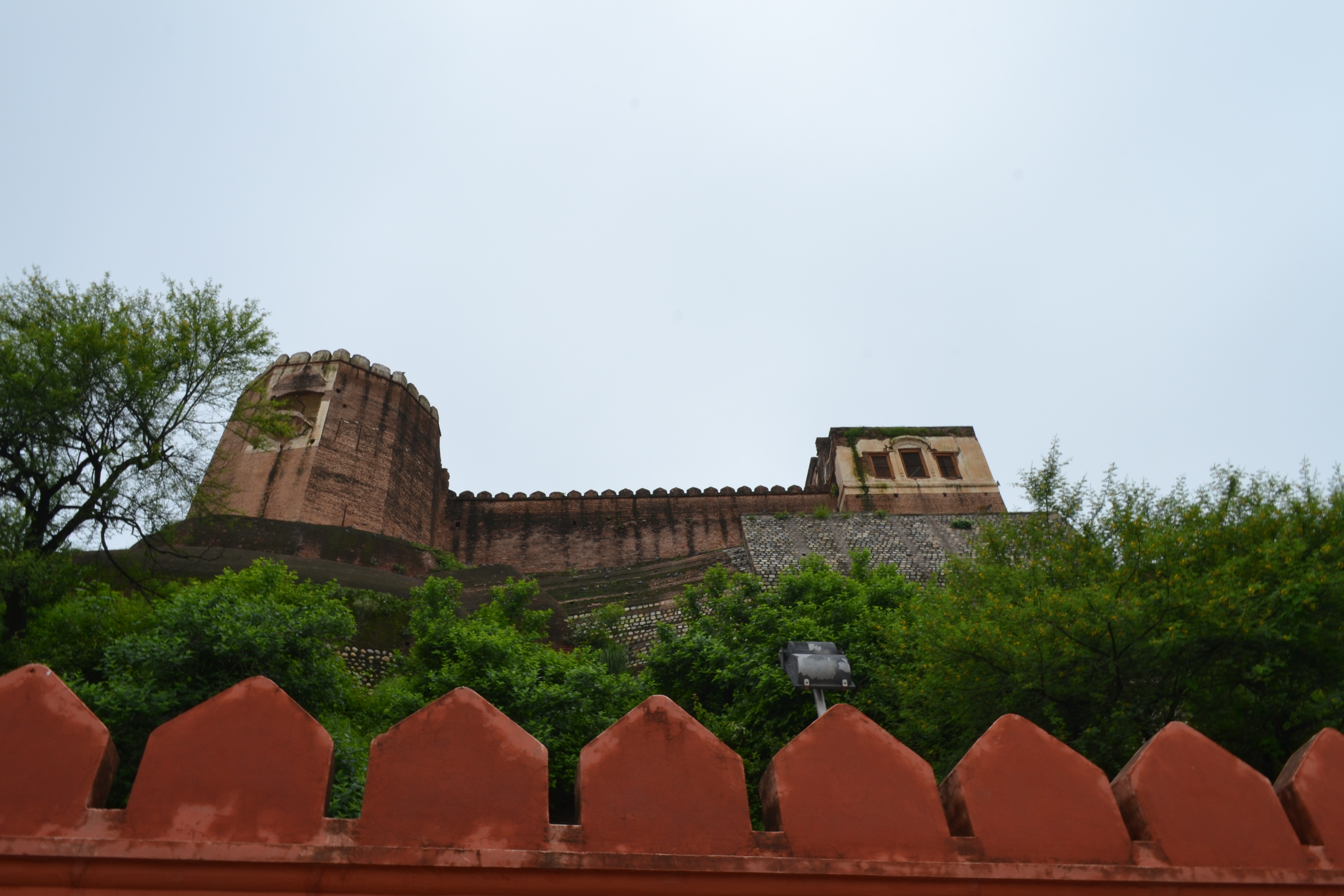
Maharaja Ranjit Singh (Sikh monarch) hunting garrison at Akhnoor as viewed from Ghat on Chenab River near “Jio-pota” embankment

== See also ==
- List of Monuments of National Importance in Jammu and Kashmir
