= Semthan =

Coordinates: 33.805833°N 75.097500°E

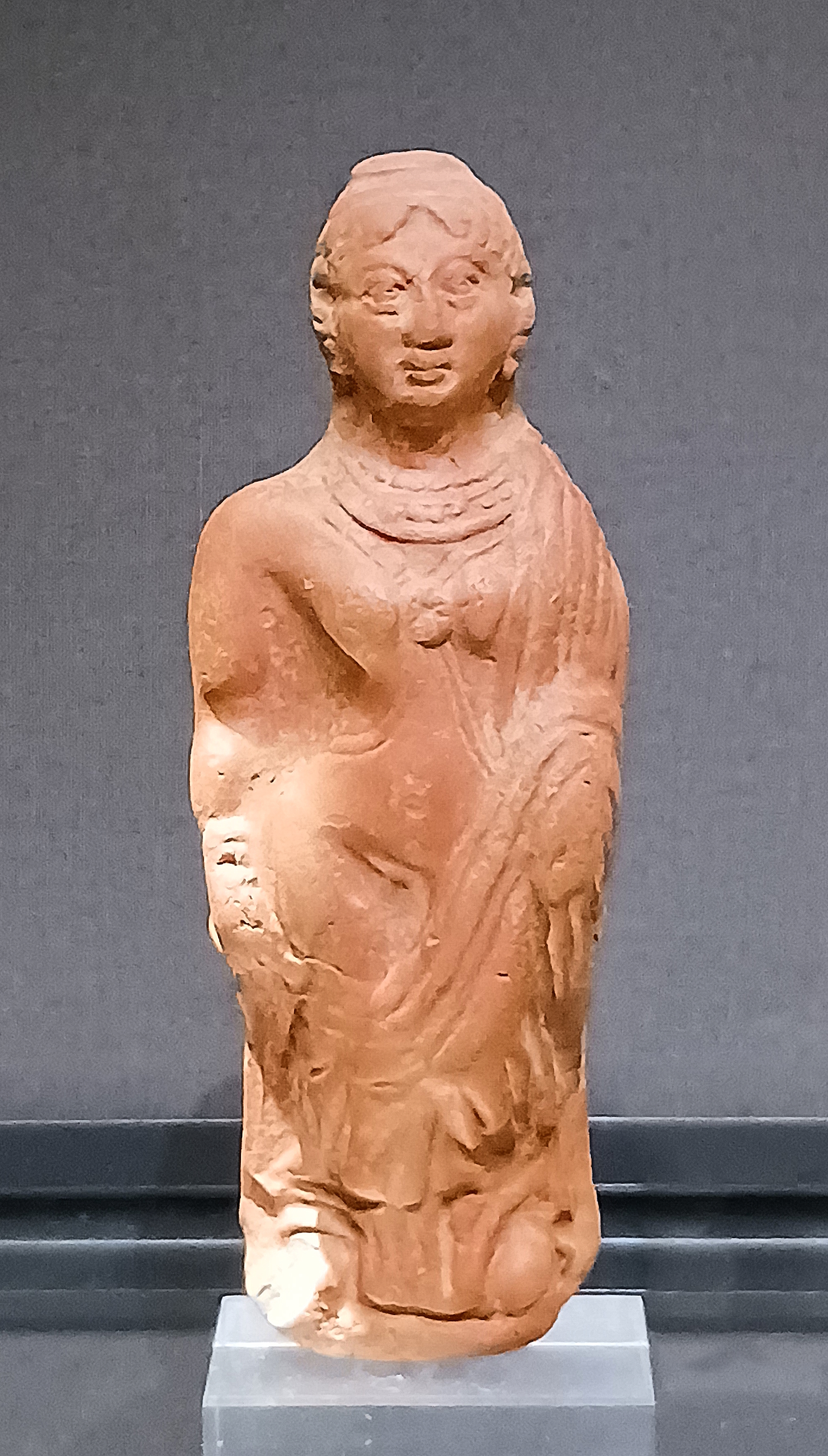
Statuette from Semthan, ancient Chakradhara. Kashmir, 100 BCE-100 CE. Terracotta plaque. Semi-draped figure with Hellenistic influence. Ashmolean Museum.

Location of Sentham in J&K, India

Semthan, also Semithan is a village 1 km north of Bijbehara in the Anantnag district of the Kashmir Valley in Jammu and Kashmir, India. It has an archaeological site, the ancient site of Chakradhar where cultural sequences were stratified, from the Neolithic to the Indo-Greek and Kushan periods.

== Excavations ==
The site was excavated during several seasons from 1977 to 1981. Upon excavation, the site revealed several occupation layers:

Period 1: pre-NBPW (700-500 BCE)
Period 2: NBPW (500-200 BCE)
Period 3: Indo-Greek (200-0 BCE)
Period 4: Kushan Empire, Huna Kingdom (1st-5th century CE)
Period 5: Hindu (5th-13th century CE)
Period 6: Late Medieval, post 13th century

Pottery wares were found in Level 3, as well as a seal with an Indo-Greek deity, and Indo-Greek coins. A large number of terracotta figurines were also found in Level 4.

== Artefacts ==
Semthan was at one point a Greek settlement. Many figurines in the Hellenistic style were found during the excavations. The female figurines are fully dressed, with the left leg slightly bent, and wear the Greek chiton and himation, and the Hellenistic styles of Bactria are probably the ultimate source of these designs. It is thought that the Indo-Greeks introduced their artistic styles into the area as they moved eastward from the area of Gandhara into South Kashmir. The stratigraphy does not permit a precise dating of these statuettes, and the date has been broadly defined as probably pertaining to the period from the 2nd half of the 1st century BCE to the 1st or 2nd century CE, in effect covering the end of the Indo-Greek period to the early Kushan period.

Such Hellenistic draped figurines have not been found at Taxila or Charsadda, although they are known to have been Indo-Greek cities, but probably this is mainly because excavations to Greek levels have been very limited: in Sirkap, only one eight of the excavations were made down to the Indo-Greek and early Saka levels, and only in an area far removed from the center of the ancient city, where few finds could be expected.

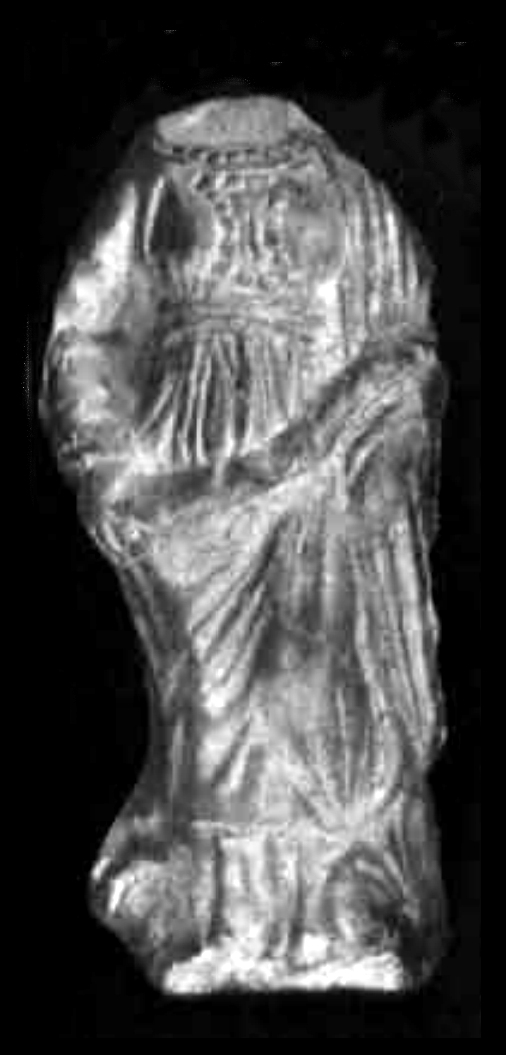
Terracotta statuette in Chiton and Himation, Semthan

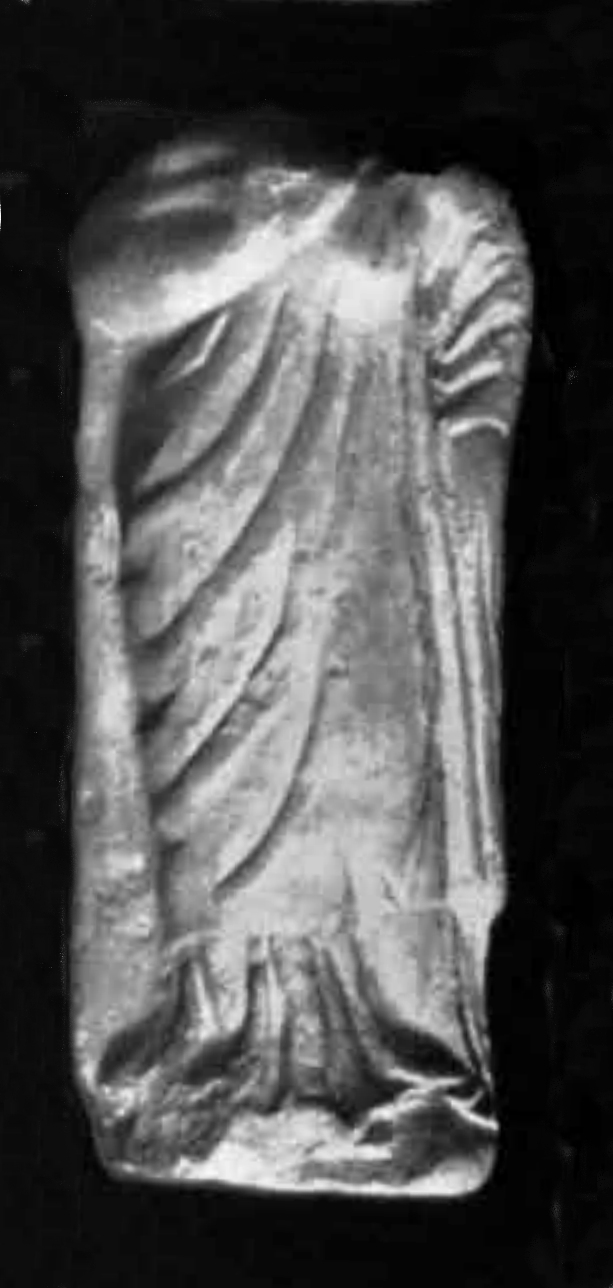
Male Hellenistic dress, Semthan

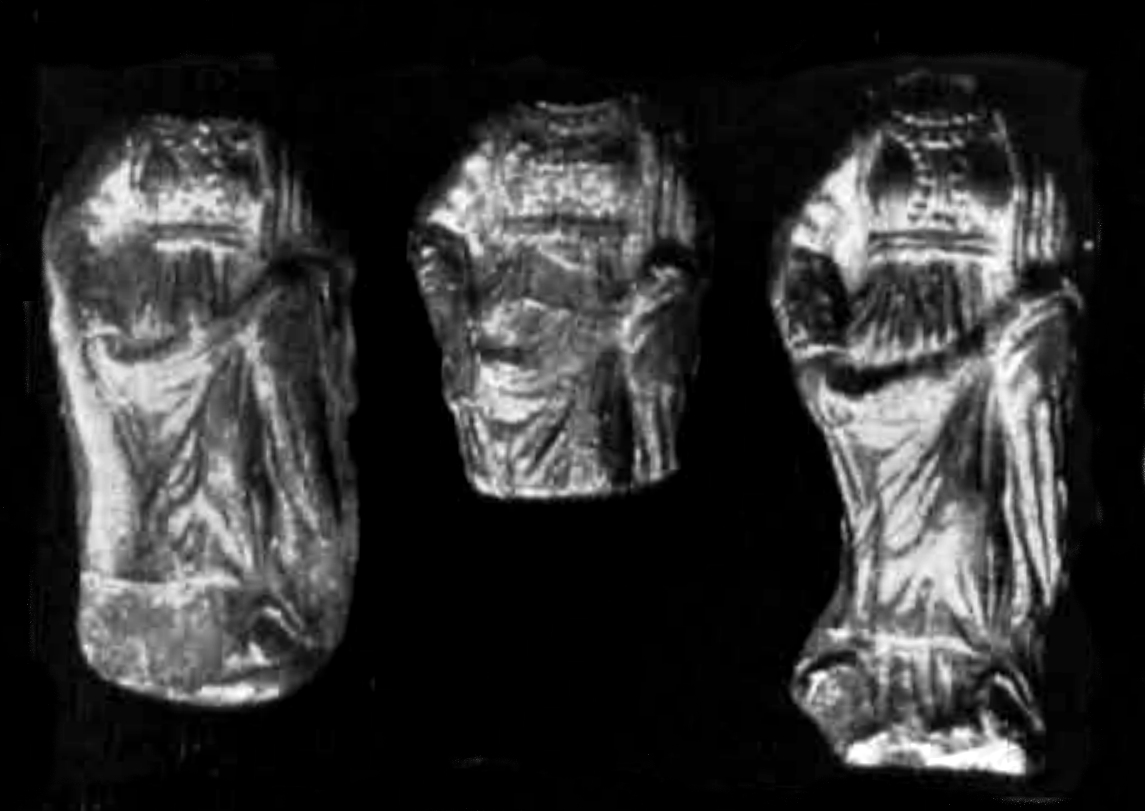
Semthan, female Hellenistic dresses

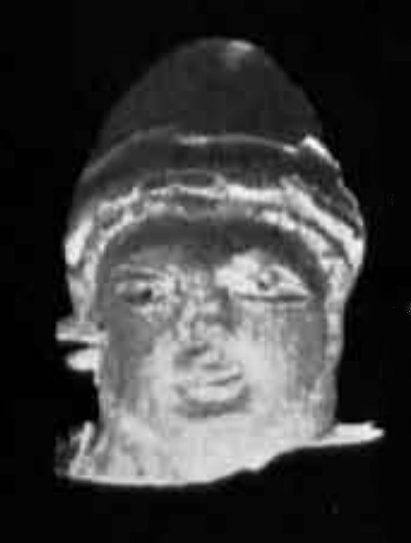
Figure with helmet, Semthan

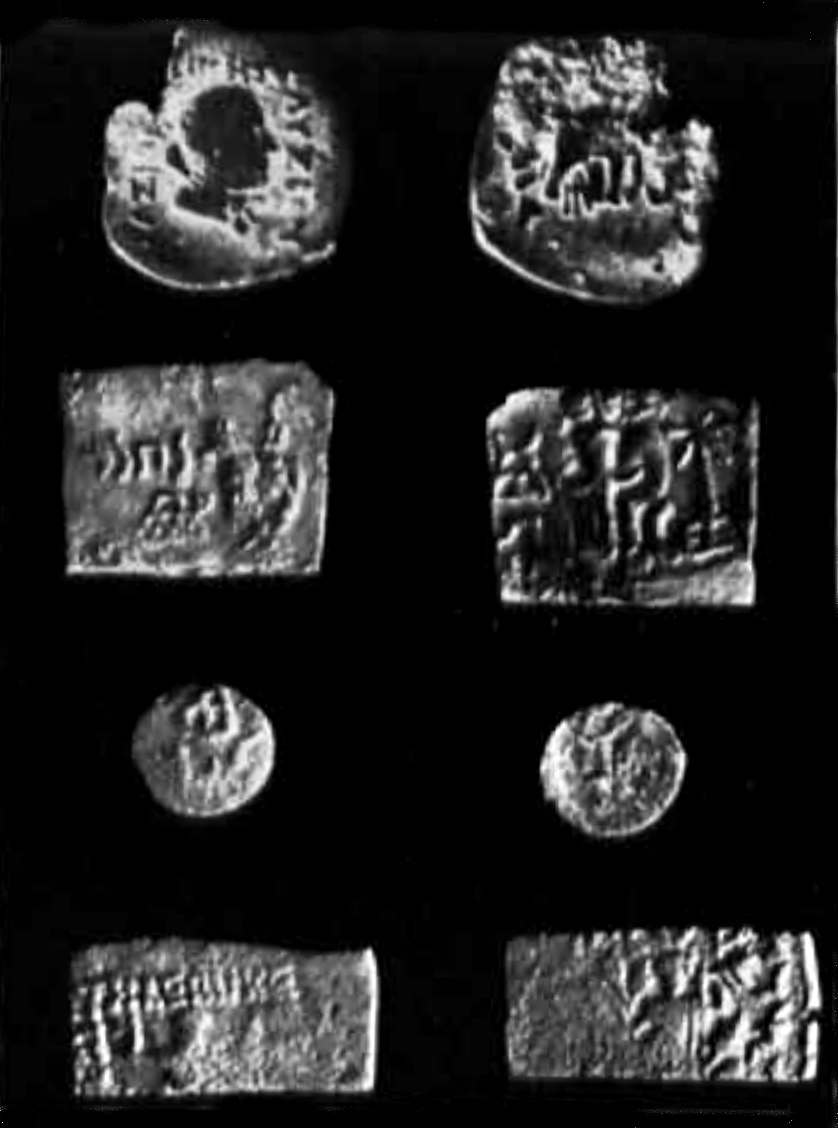
Indo-Greek coin of Lysias and other coinage, Semthan

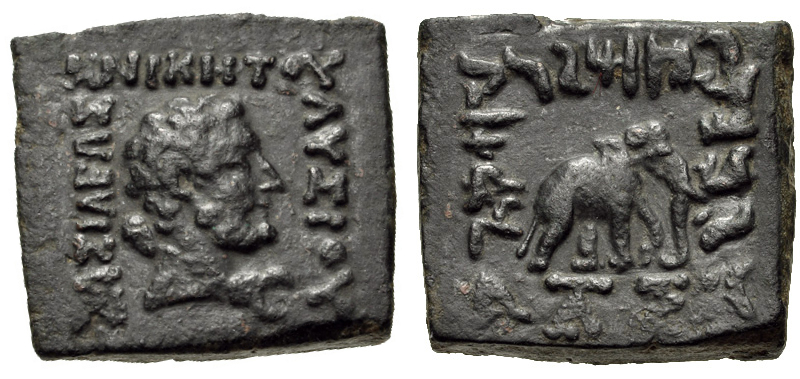
Indo-Greek coin of Lysias (130–120 BCE), Indian square standard, of the type found at Semthan

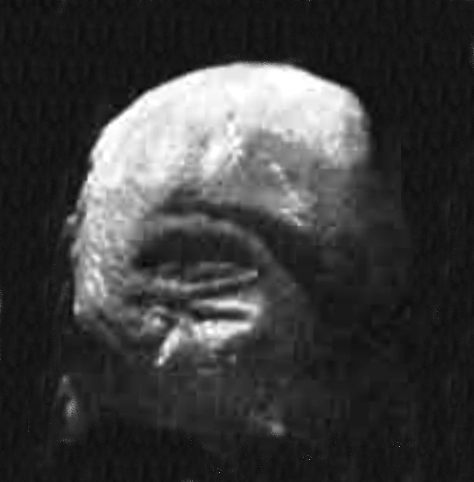
Semthan, sealing with Indo-Greek deity.
