= Krimchi temples =

8th-century temple complex in India

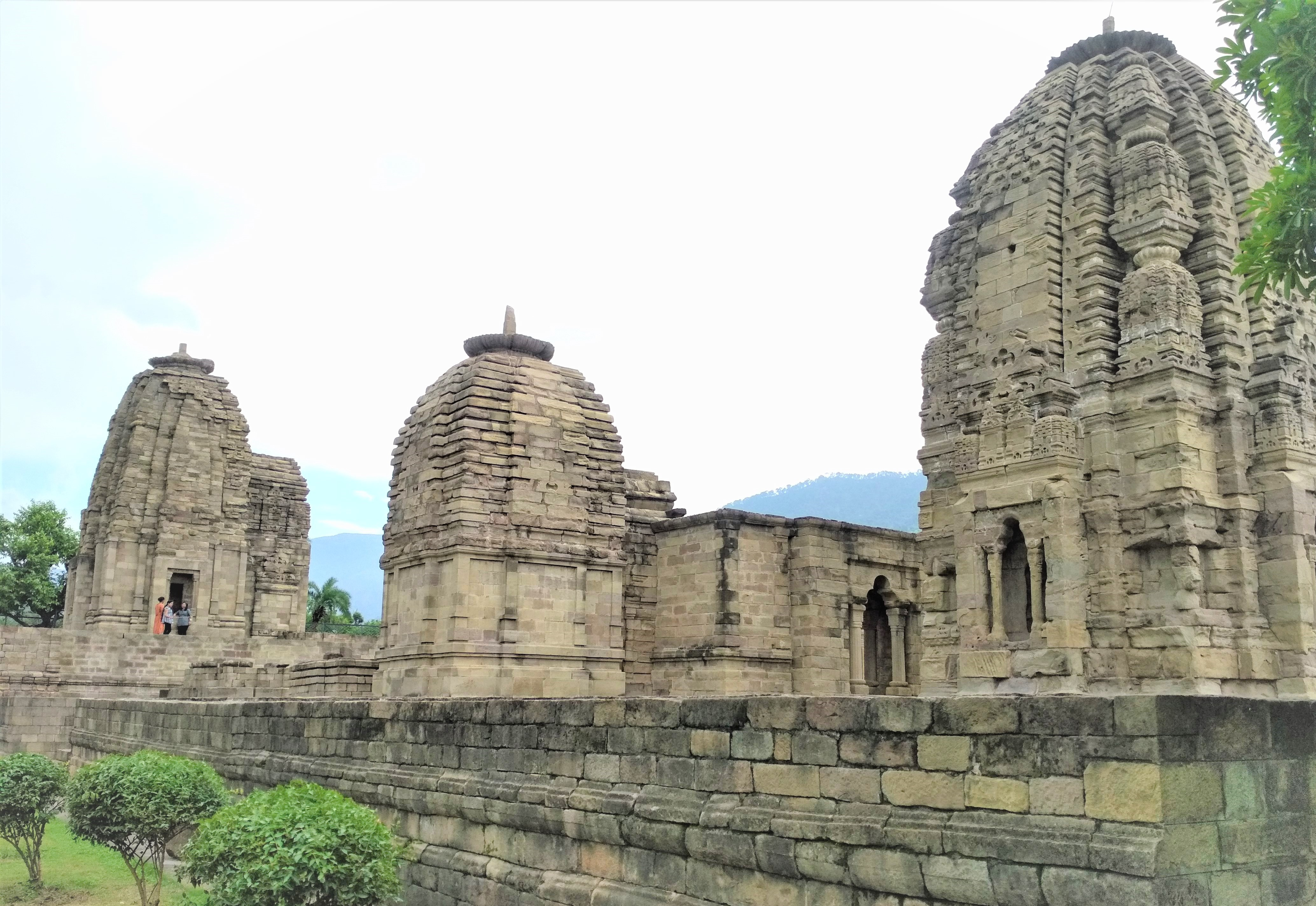
Krimachi Group of Temples in Udhampur, Jammu, J&K, India

Krimchi temples is a complex of seven ancient Hindu temples in the Udhampur District of the Jammu Division in Jammu and Kashmir, India. It is located on bank of a stream Birunala in village Krimachi, 12 km from Udhampur. This group of temples is locally known as the Pandava Temples.

== History ==
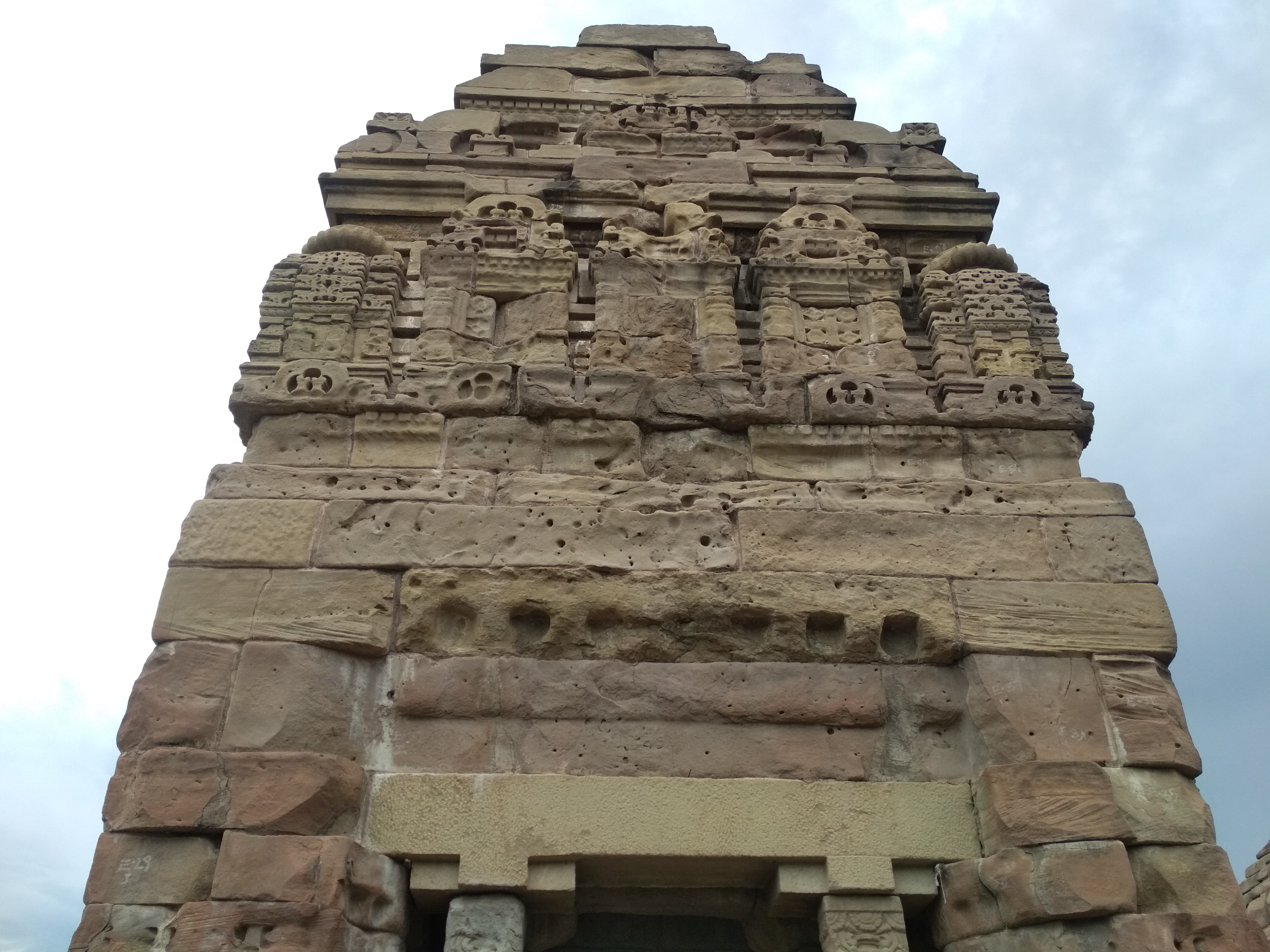
Architecture of a Krimchi Temple's spire

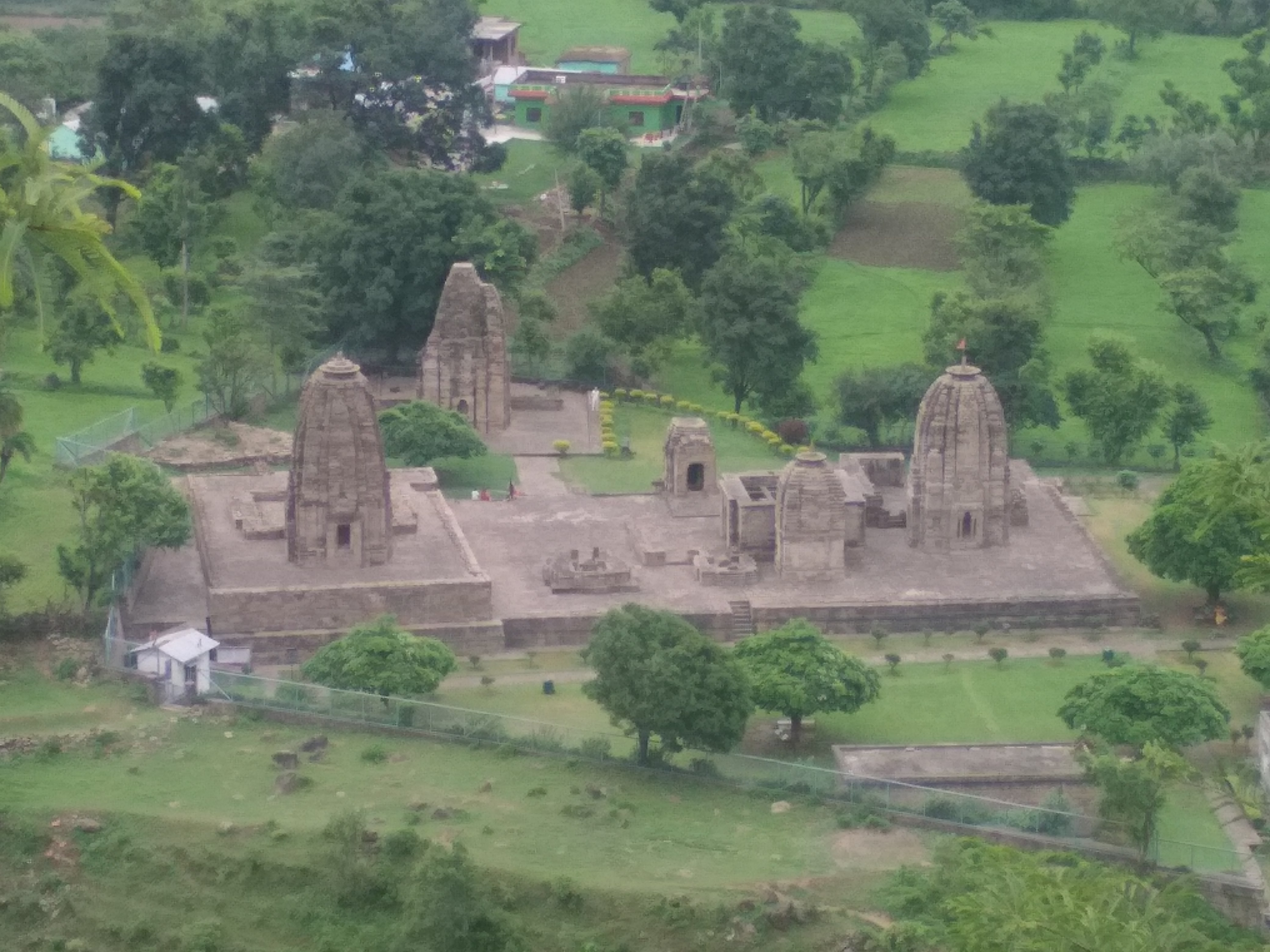
Krimchi Temples as seen from the Krimchi Fort

According to the Archaeological Survey of India these temples were constructed during 8 to 9 century AD. The temples were constructed in stages. It appears that temples No. 6 and 7 were damaged several centuries ago.

The Krimchi Temple Complex is one of the earliest surviving medieval Hindu temple groups in the western Himalayas and was built in the Nagara style under Gurjara-Pratihara architectural tradition . Its defining features include rekha (latina) shikharas, panchratha ground plans, gavaksha (chaitya-window) ornamentation, urushringas (miniature shikharas), raised jagati, articulated jangha, and pillared mandapas, all characteristic of the Gurjara-Pratihara tradition of Rajasthan and central India.This arrangement represents the mature Nagara temple plan developed during the Gurjara–Pratihara period.While incorporating regional adaptations such as restrained sculpture, heavy sandstone masonry, and simplified mouldings suited to the Himalayan environment, the temples clearly represent a regional expression of the Gurjara-Pratihara architectural idiom.

Local belief holds that they go back to the protagonists of the Mahabharata War, or a late Pandava dynasty that ruled in Jammu and Kashmir (speculated by Alexander Cunningham). According to legendary accounts, Raja Kichak was said to be creator of the town Krimchi and the kingdom. It is also said pandavas in exile remained there for a long period. As the temples were built in 8th century, these temple complex reflect the profoundness of Indo-Greek architecture.

== Complex ==
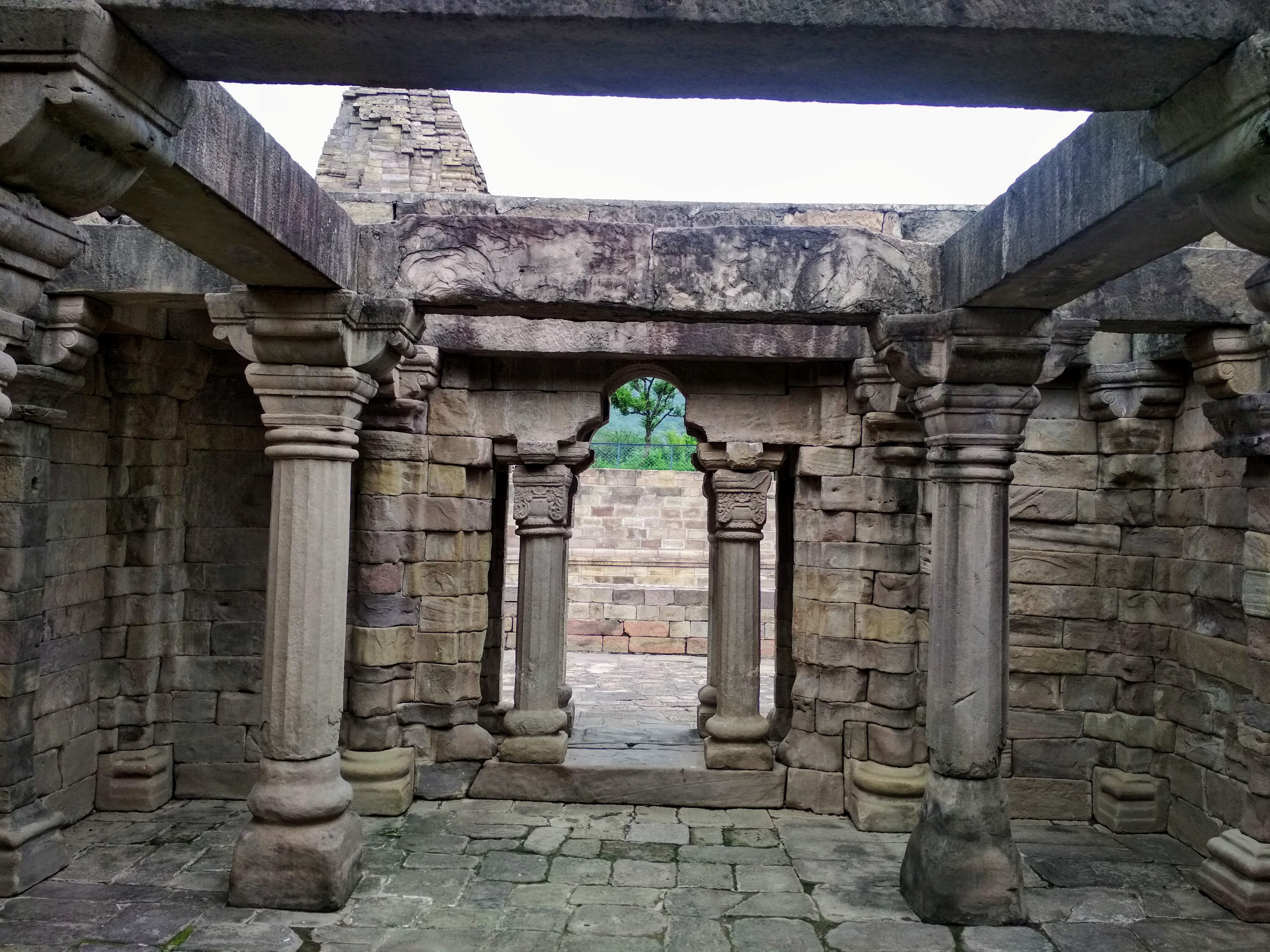
Pillared Mandapa in Krimchi temples

The temple complex comprises four large temples and three smaller shrines. The principal temple, standing approximately 50 feet (15 m) tall, is dedicated to several Hindu deities, including Shiva, Ganesha, Vishnu, and Parvati. The architectural style of the complex closely resembles that of the classical temples of Kashmir.
