= Bumzuva Cave and Temple =

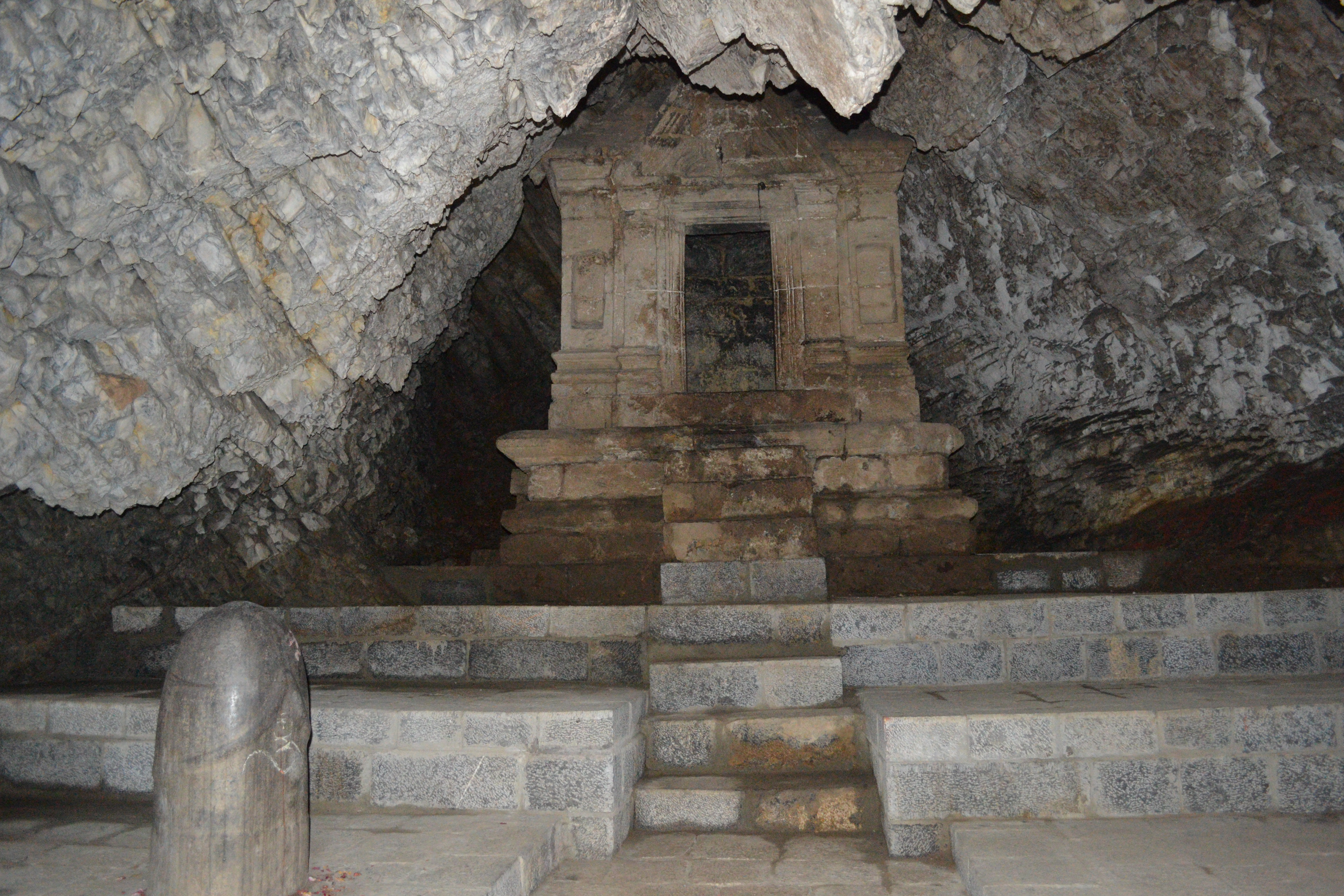
- Bumzuva_Cave

- Location in Jammu & Kashmir, India Bumzuva Cave and Temple (India)

Religion
- Affiliation: Hinduism
- District: Anantnag
- Deity: Shiva

Location
- Location: Village of Bumazuv
- State: Jammu and Kashmir
- Country: India
- Interactive map of Bumzuva Cave and Temple
- Coordinates: 33°46′19″N 75°12′47″E

Architecture
- Completed: 12th Century

Bumzuva cave and temple are a group of Hindu temples and man-made caves in the village of Bumazuv in the Lidder Valley of Anantnag district in Jammu and Kashmir, India.

== Description ==
Located a mile to the north of Bavan sacred springs, the cave is carved out of limestone cliff. Overlooking the beautiful Lidar valley carved out of large masses of limestone cliffs, the Bumzuva caves blanket the small village of Bumzuva, located only a mile north of the sacred springs of Bavan, the caves attract many for their delicate architectural work. Believed to have been built in the 12th century, the caves encompass a Shiva Temple, where lord Shiva is enshrined as Shivalinga. The Facade of the gateway to the temple is a work of stone masonry, consisting of a single trifold arched doorway, covered by side walls. The caves are full of floral scrolls of precise handiwork with rows of rosettes and figures of dancing dwarfs adorning the walls.

At the foot of the caves, are two temples which have been converted into Muslim Ziarats. The larger of the two is named as the Ziarat of Baba Bandin Sahib, a disciple of the famous Muslim saint of Kashmir, Shaikh Nuruddin. Overlapping stones cover the ceiling with a full bloomed lotus to his adorning the uppermost stone. Maintained by the Archaeological survey of India, the caves have been part of the rich heritage of both Hinduism & Islam, where the people of both religions have peacefully preached their faith.

One of the caves has a Shiva temple enshrined. This temple has a trefoil arched doorway. The temple is believed to have been built in the twelfth century A.D. The length of the cave is approximately 5 by 10 meters. It is maintained by the Archaeological Survey of India.
