= Bagh e Mehtab =

Baghi e Mehtab
- Suburb of Srinagar
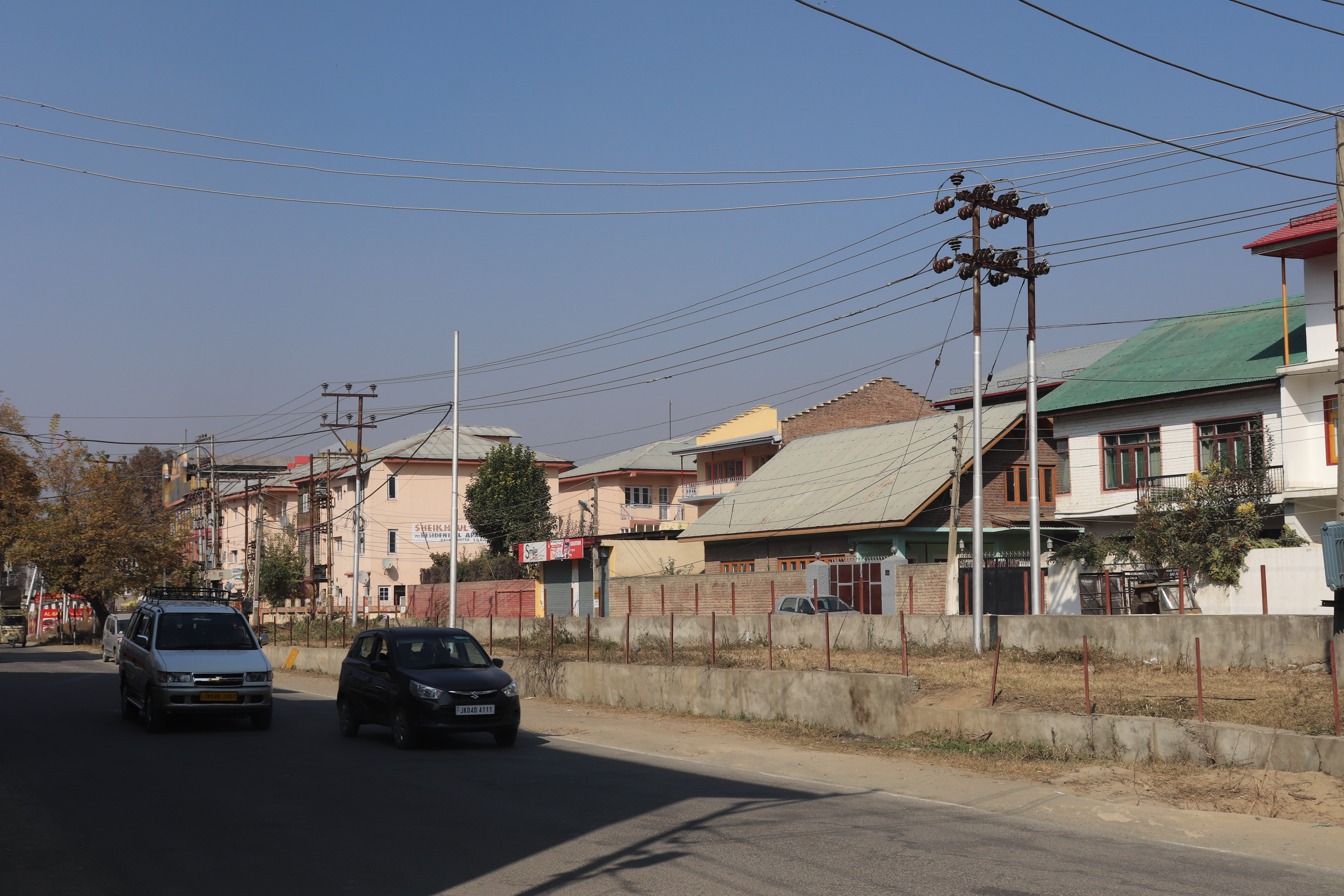

- Location in Jammu and Kashmir, India Baghi e Mehtab (India)
- Coordinates: 34°00′53″N 74°48′46″E
- Country: India
- Union territory: Jammu and Kashmir
- District: Srinagar
- Founder: Mehtab Begum

Government
  - Type: Government of Jammu and Kashmir
  - Body: Srinagar Municipal Corporation
- Elevation: 1,593 m (5,226 ft)

Languages
  - Official: Kashmiri, Dogri, Urdu, Hindi, English
- Time zone: UTC+5:30 (IST)
- Postal Code: 190019
- Vehicle registration: JK
- Website: http://srinagar.nic.in

Bagh I Mehtab (literally: Garden of Mehtab) is located in Srinagar, Jammu and Kashmir, India, about 7 km from the city centre, Lal Chowk.

The area is primarily residential, with a government housing colony and several private colonies.

The settled population is predominantly Sunni Muslim, with residents having migrated from different parts of the Kashmir Valley.

== Location ==
The area is located on the banks of the river Doodganga (literally: the Ganges of Milk), which has its source in the upper reaches of Yusmarg.

The locality lies on the Chadoora – Charari Sharief – Yusmarg highway.

The Banihal–Baramula DEMU railway line passes over a railway bridge near the periphery of Bagh e Mehtab. The small bridge adjacent to it serves as a link for commuters travelling to Rawalpora and Gulzarpora, saving them five to six kilometres of distance.

== Nearby localities ==
- Nowgam
- Chanapora
- Rawalpora
- Astanpora
- Checki Methan alias Beighpora
- Kralapora
- Machowa
- Dooniwari
- Shankarpora
- Gopalpora
- Chadoora

== History ==
It was named after Mehtab Begum, who migrated to Pakistan after the partition of India in 1947. After the migration, the land was taken by the custodian department of the State.

The whole area was initially an orchard of around 600 kanals, with plum and apple trees planted across the whole area, before its allotment as a residential settlement.

An area in the neighbourhood was used as an interrogation centre by the local police before 1980s. The location now has been converted into a public park, which is nicknamed as 'Jail Park'.

Office of Yusmarg Development Authority is situated in Bagh e Mehtab.

In 2021, a public library containing over 45,000 books was opened in the locality.
