= Ramnagar Fort, Udhampur =

Fort in India

Ramnagar Fort
- Part of Forts in India
- Ramnagar, Udhampur district, India
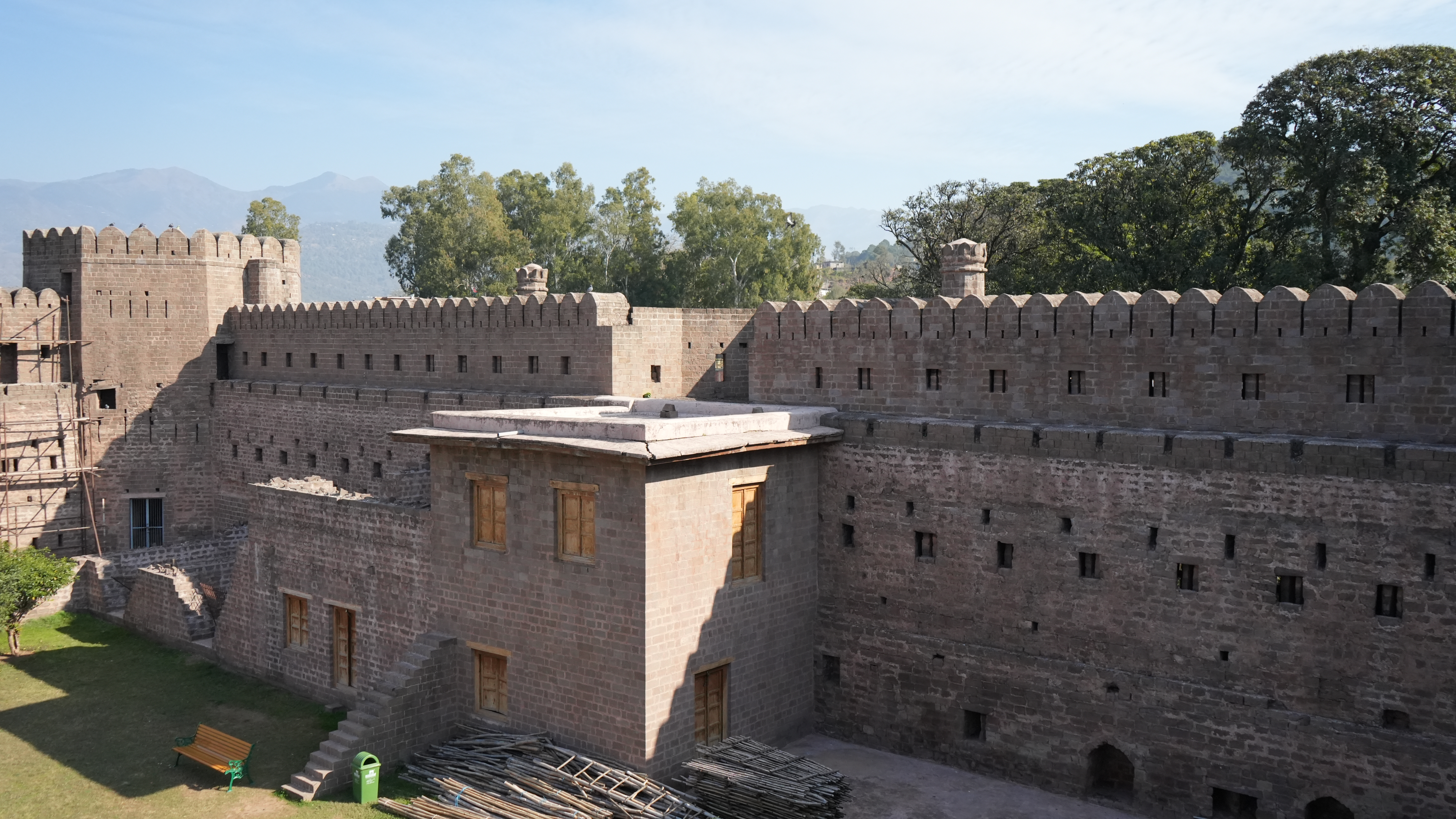
- Ancient fort attributed to Raja Suchet Singh

Site information
- Type: Fort
- Open to the public: Yes

Location
- Ramnagar, Udhampur district, India Ramnagar Fort (India)
- Coordinates: 32.8051°N 75.3181°E

Site history
- Built by: Raja Suchet Singh

Ramnagar Fort is a fort at the town of Ramnagar in the Udhampur district of Indian-administered Jammu and Kashmir. It is believed to have been built by Rajput Raja Suchet Singh, who died in 1844. His wife performed sati nearby. There is a Samadhi of Maharani at the site where the sati was performed. The fort was renovated and undertaken by the Archaeological Survey of India in 1972. It is a protected monument of the Archaeological department.

== Architectural design ==
The ancient fort is square with polygonal bastions to support its four corners. The fortifications wall and the bastions rise to three storeys and are crowned with battlements and merinos. Around the central courtyard inside Ramnagar Fort, there are cells and vaulted chambers where cannonballs are stored. There are images of Ganesa, Durga, and Hanuman in the gateway. The fort is surrounded by a moat and access to it is gained through a narrow bridge on the southeastern side.

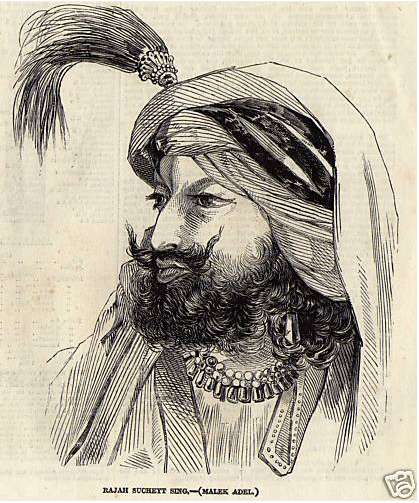
Raja Suchet Singh
