= Khanqah-e-Mu'alla =

Mosque in Srinagar, Jammu and Kashmir, India

- خانقاہِ مُعلّیٰ
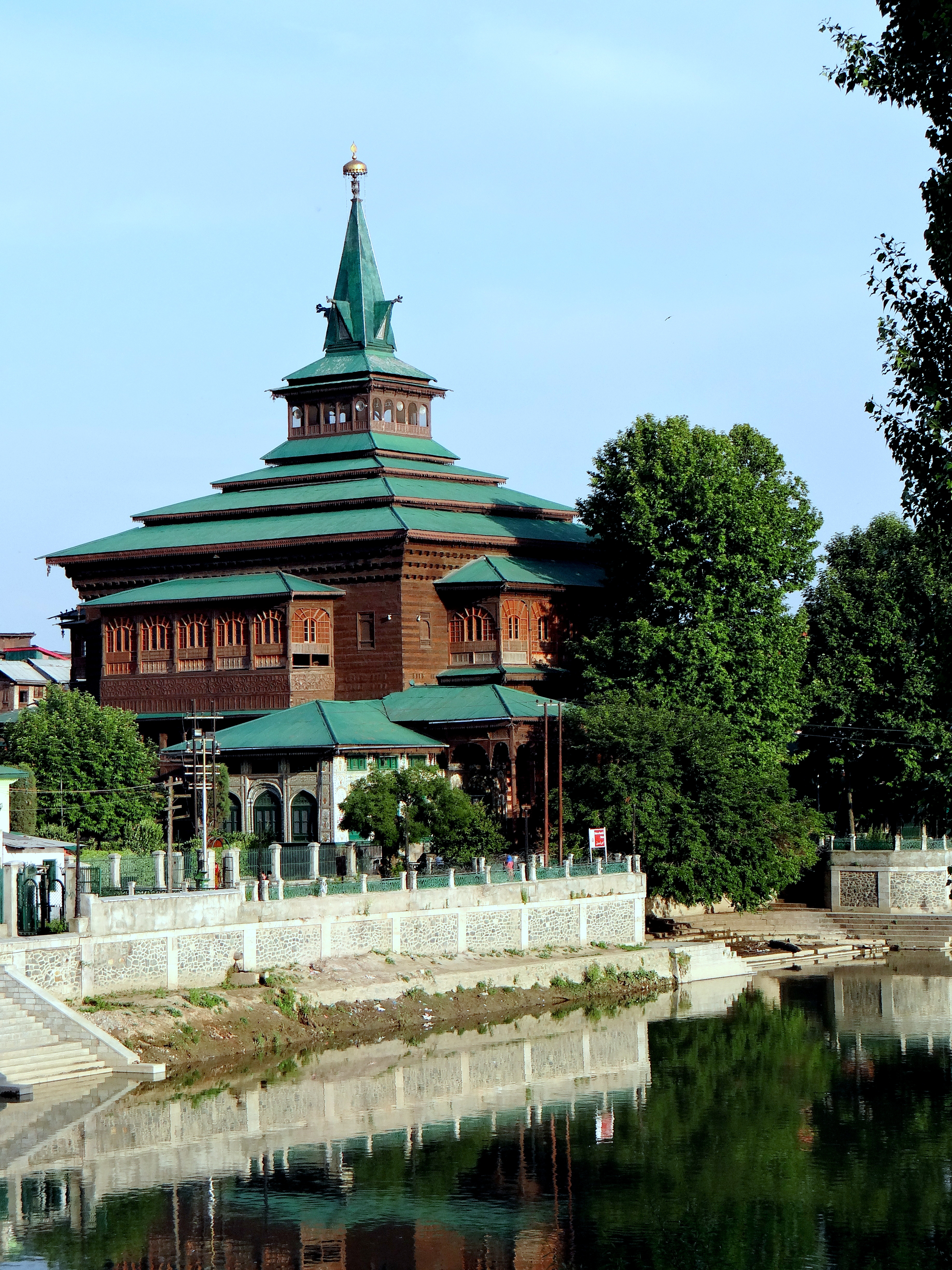
- The Khanqah on the banks of Jhelum River, in 2012

- Location of the mosque in Jammu and Kashmir

Religion
- Affiliation: Sunni Islam
- District: Srinagar district
- Region: Kashmir Valley
- Ecclesiastical or organisational status: Mosque
- Status: Active

Location
- Location: Srinagar
- Country: India
- Interactive map of Khanqah-e-Mu'alla
- Territory: Jammu and Kashmir
- Coordinates: 34°05′28″N 74°48′28″E

Architecture
- Type: Mosque architecture
- Style: Kashmiri
- Founder: Sultan Sikandar
- Completed: 1395 CE (first structure); 1732 CE (rebuilt)

Specifications
- Height (max): 38 m (125 ft)
- Spire: 1 (turret)

Monument of National Importance
- Official name: Khanqah of Shah Hamadan
- Reference no.: N-JK-37

The Khanqah-e-Mu'alla, (Note: Urdu: خانقاہِ مُعلّیٰ (lit. 'The Exalted Monastery')) (commonly spelled as Khanqah-e-Moula and also known as Shah-e-Hamadan Mosque) (Note: Urdu: مسجد شاہِ ھمدان), is a khanqah (Sufi lodge) and mosque, located in the Old City of Srinagar, in the Indian-administered union territory of Jammu and Kashmir. Situated on the right bank of the river Jhelum between the Fateh Kadal and Zaina Kadal bridges, it was built in 1395, and was commissioned by Sultan Sikandar in memory of Mir Sayyid Ali Hamadani. It is held to be the first khanqah in the Kashmir Valley. It is one of the best examples of Kashmiri wooden architecture, and is decorated with papier-mâché. The mosque structure is a Monument of National Importance.

== History ==
The mosque was commissioned by Sultan Sikandar Butshikan in 1395 CE in memory of the Islamic preacher Mir Sayyid Ali Hamadani, the central figure involved in the widespread conversion to Islam in Kashmir. Also known as Shah-e-Hamadan (the King of Hamadan), the preacher came to Kashmir from the city of Hamadan, Persia in the 14th century. He is credited for the spread of Islam in Kashmir.

In 1480, the shrine was destroyed in a fire. The then-ruler, Sultan Hassan Shah, expanded its premises and rebuilt it. In 1731 CE, the khanqah was again destroyed by fire and then rebuilt by Abdul Barkat Khan, the Mughal governor. On 15 November 2017, another fire broke out in the shrine which damaged the spire of the building. Fire tenders were brought on the scene and they managed to arrest the spread of the fire which prevented any further damage to the building. Restoration work was immediately started, and on 30 March 2018, a refurbished crown was successfully installed on the spire of the shrine.

In recent centuries, it has been claimed that this structure was built replacing a Hindu Kali temple based on word-of-mouth claims made in the 20th century. However, such claims have been thoroughly investigated and refuted via archeological and historical evidence.

== Gallery ==
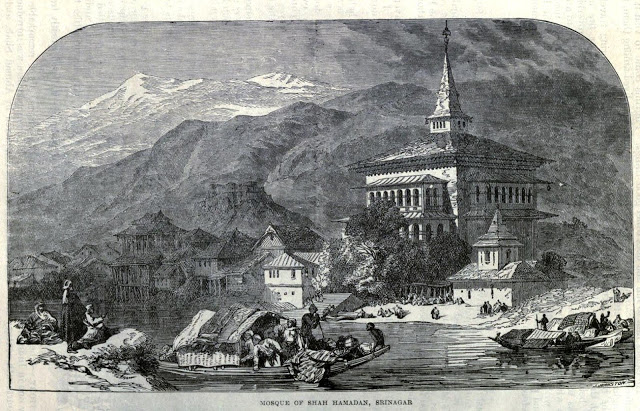
Sketch of the mosque, 1906

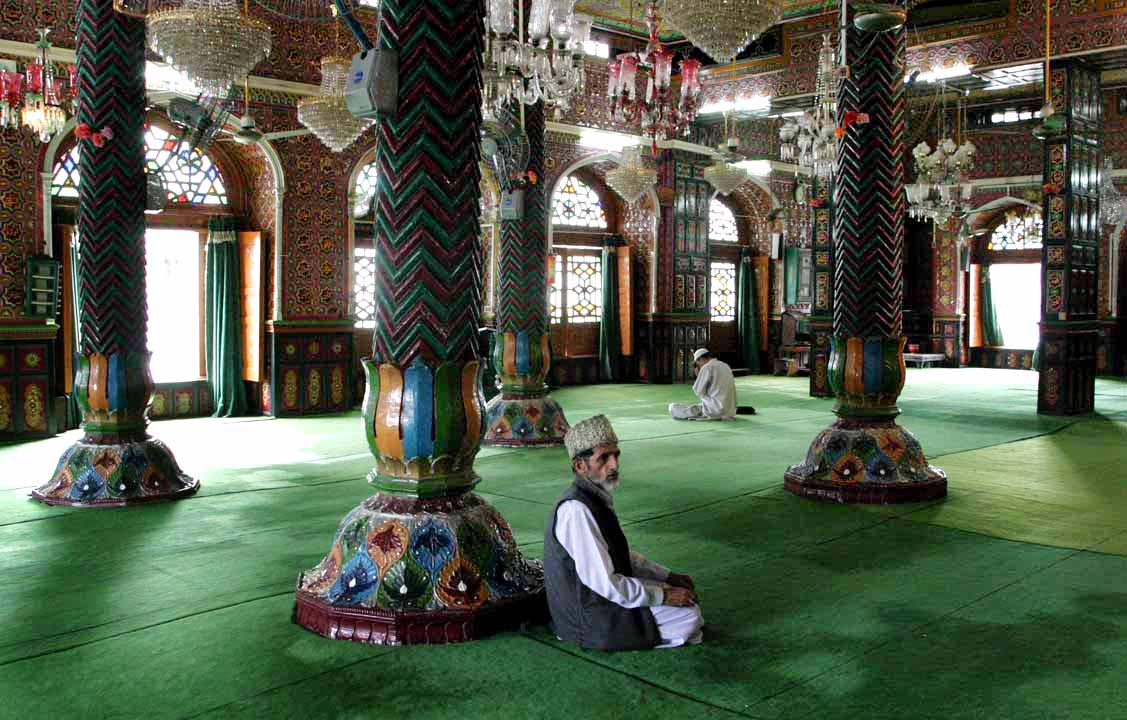
The mosque's interior has intricate woodwork and is richly decorated with papier-maché, seen above in 2007; the wooden structure makes it prone to fires, the latest such incident occurring in 2017

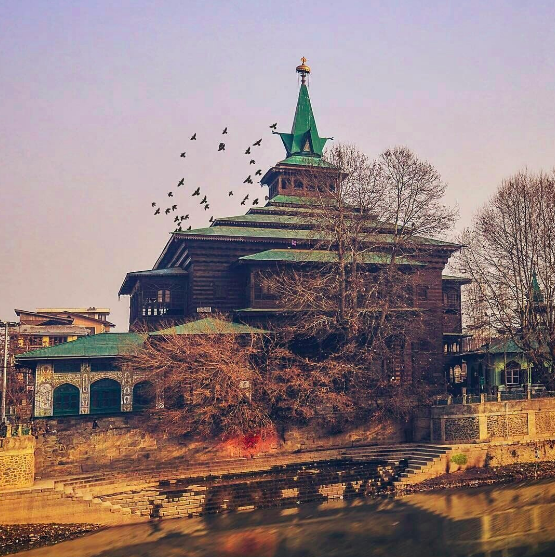
View of the Khanqah from the Jhelum river. On the bank saffron marks indicate the supposed existence of a Kali temple, although no conclusive evidence exists of the latter.

== See also ==
- Islam in India
- List of mosques in India
- List of Monuments of National Importance in Jammu and Kashmir

== Sources ==
- Teng, Muhammad Yusuf, ed. (1986). Kashir Encyclopedia کٲشر انسائیکلوپیڈیا (in Kashmiri). Vol. 1. Srinagar: Jammu and Kashmir Academy of Art, Culture and Language. pp. 160–164.
