= Srinagar district =

District of Jammu and Kashmir, India

- District of Jammu and Kashmir administered by India
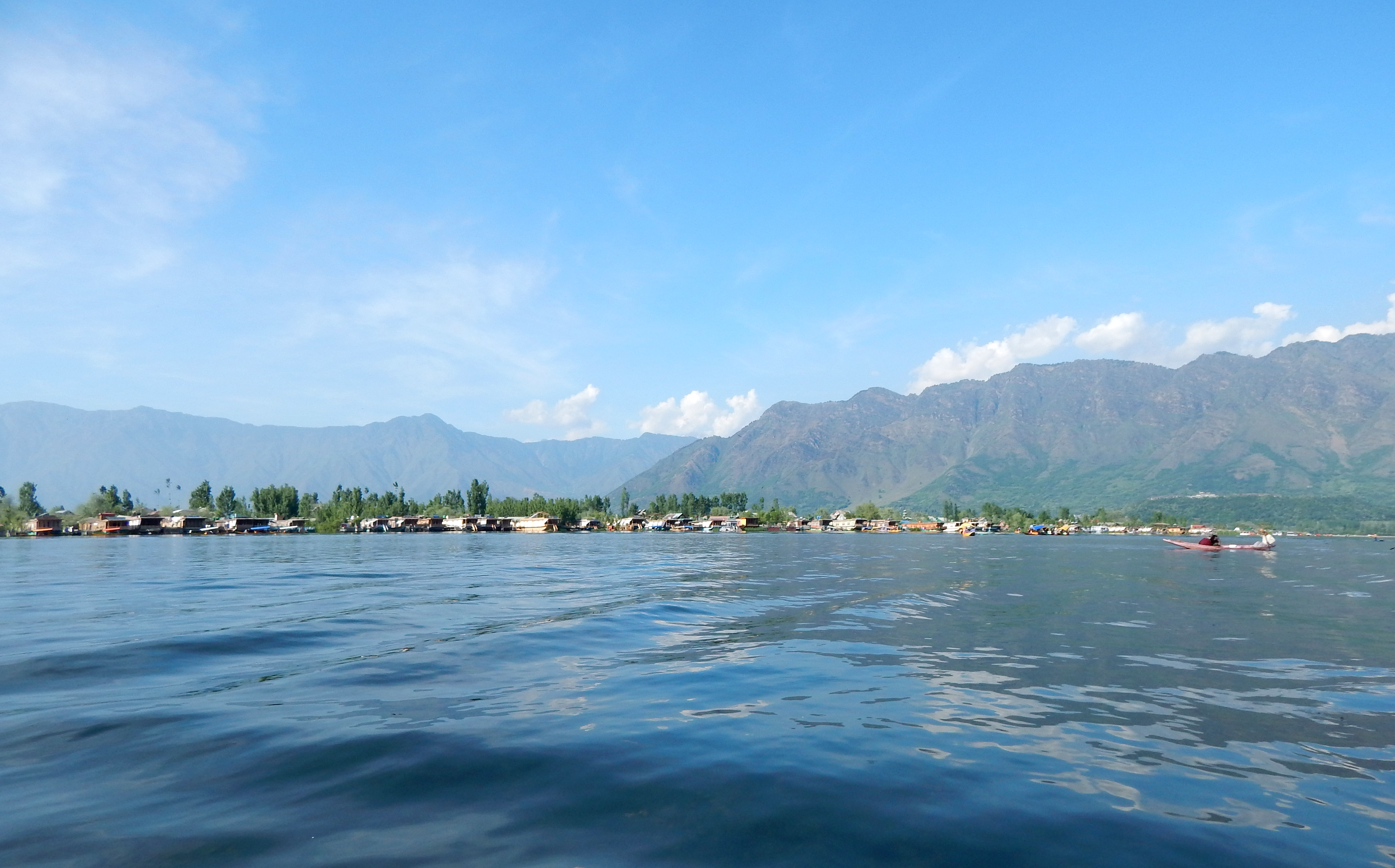
- Dal Lake, Srinagar, Jammu and Kashmir, India.
- Interactive map of Srinagar district
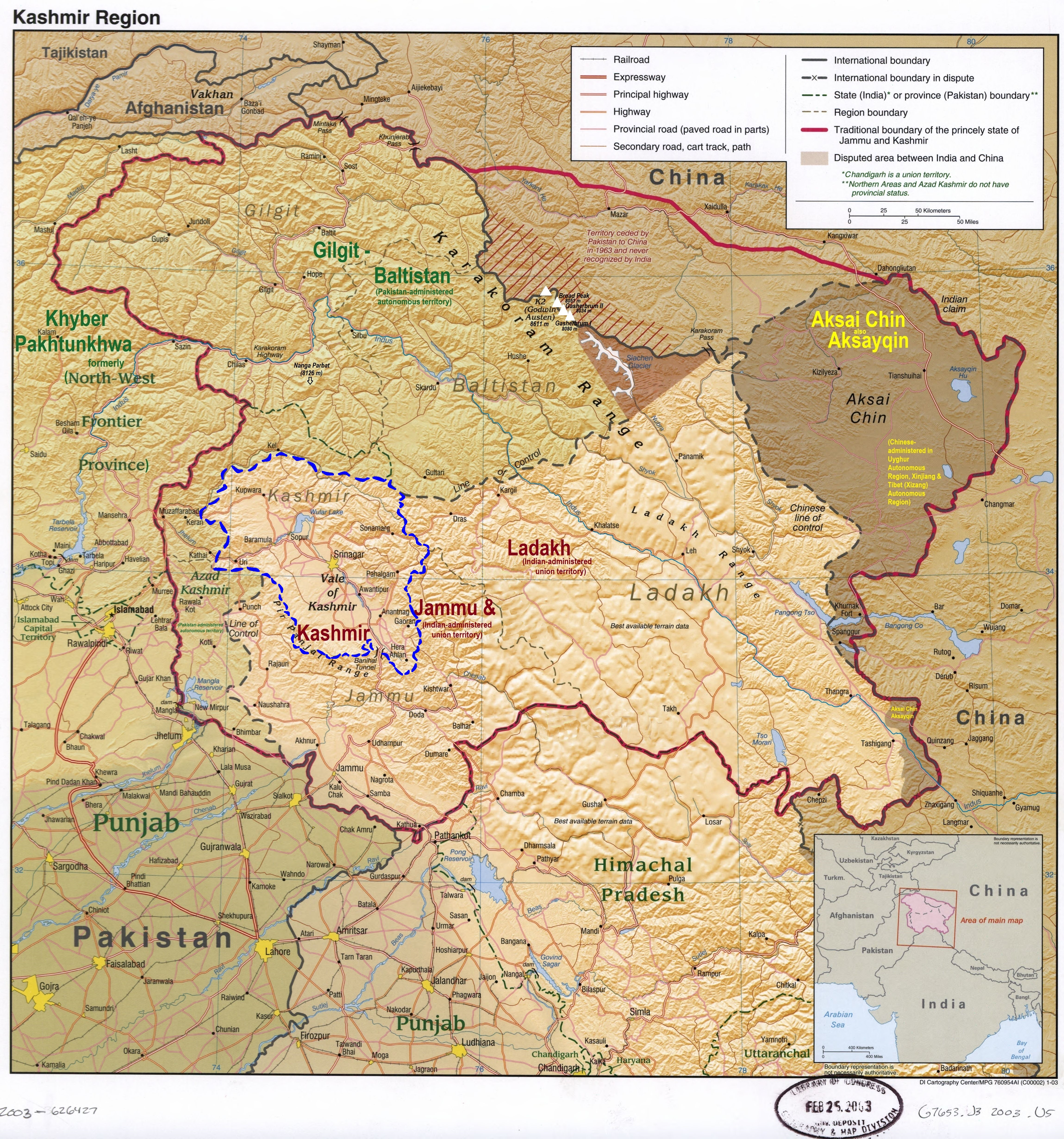
- Srinagar district is in Indian-administered Jammu and Kashmir in the disputed Kashmir region It is in the Kashmir division (bordered in neon blue).
- Coordinates (Srinagar): 34°05′N 74°50′E
- Administering country: India
- Union territory: Jammu and Kashmir
- Headquarters: Srinagar
- Tehsils: 1. Central Shalteng; 2. Chanapora/Natipora; 3. Eidgah; 4. Khanyar; 5. Pantha Chowk; 6. Srinagar North; 7. Srinagar South

Government
  - District Magistrate: Akshay Labroo(IAS)

Area
  - Total: 1,979 km^{2} (764 sq mi)

Population (2011)
  - Total: 1,250,173
  - Density: 631.7/km^{2} (1,636/sq mi)

Languages
  - Official: Kashmiri, Urdu, Hindi, Dogri, English
- Time zone: UTC+05:30 (IST)
- Literacy: 69.41%
- Website: https://srinagar.nic.in/

The Srinagar district is an administrative district of Indian-administered Jammu and Kashmir in the disputed Kashmir region. It is one of the 20 districts of Jammu and Kashmir. Situated in the centre of the Kashmir Valley, it is the second-most populous district of the union territory after Jammu district as per the 2011 national census, and is home to the summer capital city of Srinagar (with the city of Jammu serving as the territory's winter capital). Likewise, the city of Srinagar also serves as the Srinagar district's headquarters.

== Administration ==
Srinagar district has 2 Sub-Divisions i.e. Srinagar West and Srinagar East.

7 Tehsils are:

- Central Shalteng
- Chanapora/ Natipora
- Eidgah
- Khanyar
- Pantha chowk
- Srinagar North
- Srinagar South.

This district has 4 Blocks

- Harwan
- Qammerwari
- Khonmoh
- Srinagar

These blocks consist of a number of panchayats and villages.

== Politics ==
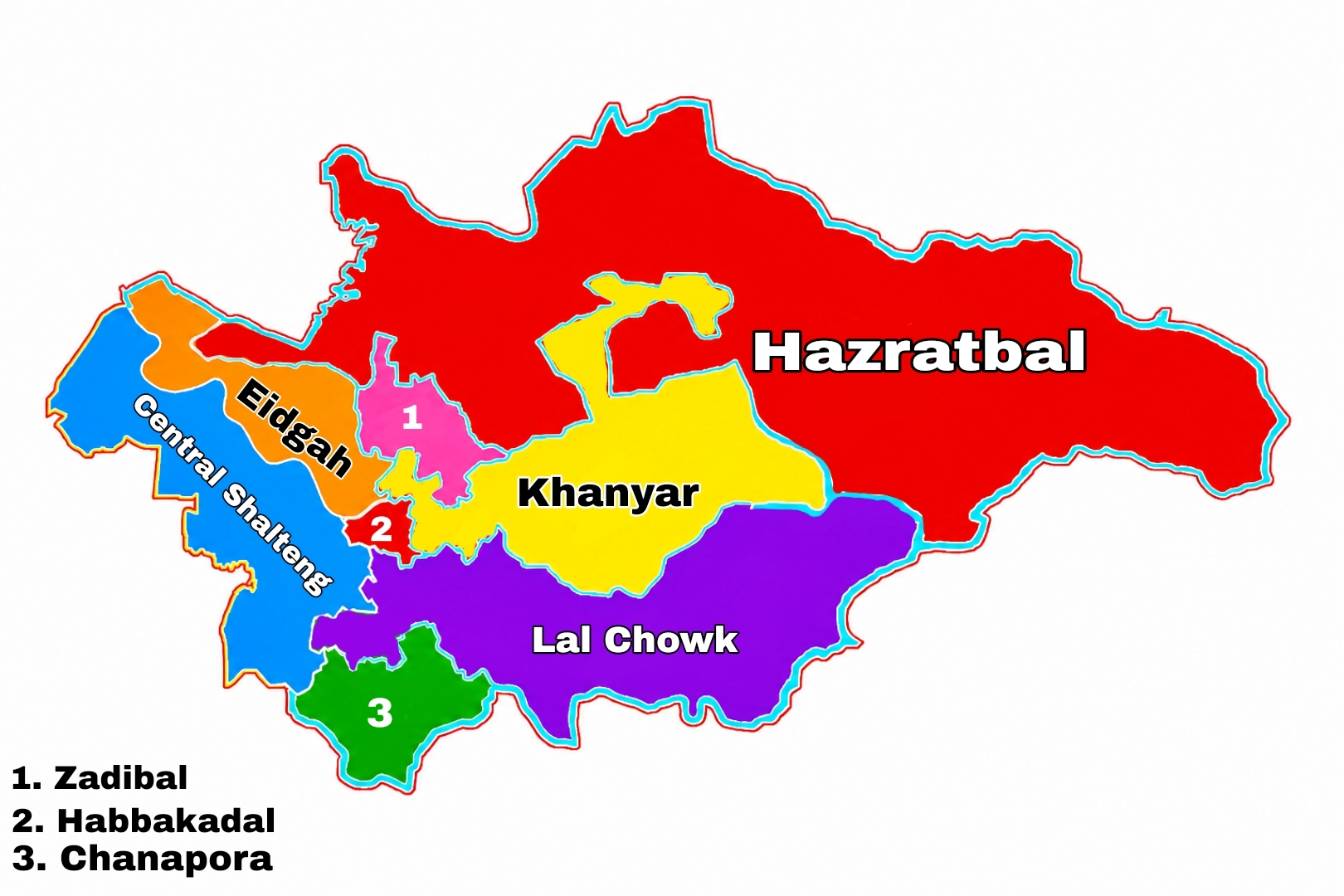
Constituency map of Srinagar

Srinagar district has 1 parliamentary constituency i.e. Srinagar and 8 assembly constituencies:

- Hazratbal
- Zadibal
- Eidgah
- Khanyar
- Habba Kadal
- Lal Chowk
- Channapora
- Central Shalteng

== Demographics ==
Historical population
Year	Pop.	±%
1901	184,676	—
1911	204,583	+10.8%
1921	223,223	+9.1%
1931	255,778	+14.6%
1941	291,522	+14.0%
1951	333,554	+14.4%
1961	375,587	+12.6%
1971	489,042	+30.2%
1981	608,244	+24.4%
1991	789,450	+29.8%
2001	1,027,670	+30.2%
2011	1,236,829	+20.4%
† 1951 and 1991 populations are estimated Source:

Religion in Srinagar district (2011)
Islam	95.19%
Hinduism	3.44%
Sikhism	0.99%
Other or not stated	0.31%

According to the 2011 census Srinagar district has a population of 1,236,829, roughly equal to the nation of Estonia or the US state of New Hampshire. This gives it a ranking of 381st in India (out of a total of 640). The district has a population density of 703 inhabitants per square kilometre (1,820/sq mi). Its population growth rate over the decade 2001–2011 was 20.35%. Srinagar has a sex ratio of 900 females for every 1,000 males (this varies with religion), and a literacy rate of 69.41%. Scheduled Castes and Scheduled Tribes make up 0.09% and 0.72% of the population. 98.60% of the population lives in urban areas.

Sex Ratio in Srinagar district in 2011 Census. (no. females per 1,000 males)
Religion (and population)	Sex Ratio
Muslim (pop 1,177,342)	945
Hindu (pop 42,540)	184
Sikh (pop 12,187)	747
Christian (pop 2,746)	551
Other (pop 2,014)	666
Total (pop 1,236,829)	900

Srinagar district: Religion, gender ratio, and % urban of population, according to the 2011 Census.
	Muslim	Hindu	Christian	Sikh	Buddhist	Jain	Other	Not stated	Total
Total	1,177,342	42,540	2,746	12,187	285	74	2	1,653	1,236,829
Total	95.19%	3.44%	0.22%	0.99%	0.02%	0.01%	0.00%	0.13%	100.00%
Male	605,244	35,952	1,771	6,975	171	39	1	998	651,124
Female	572,098	6,515	975	5,212	114	35	1	655	585,705
Gender ratio (% female)	48.6%	15.6%	35.5%	42.8%	40.0%	47.3%	50.0%	39.6%	47.4%
Sex ratio (no. of females per 1,000 males)	945	184	551	747	–	–	–	656	900
Urban	1,160,071	42,513	2,743	12,185	285	74	2	1,643	1,219,516
Rural	17,271	27	3	2	0	0	0	10	17,313
% Urban	98.5%	99.9%	99.9%	100.0%	100.0%	100.0%	100.0%	99.4%	98.6%

Languages of Srinagar district (2011)
1. Kashmiri (94.1%)
2. Hindi (1.88%)
3. Others (3.99%)

At the time of the 2011 census, 94.13% of the population spoke Kashmiri and 1.88% Hindi as their first language. Most of the Kashmiris can speak Urdu.

== Weather ==
Climate data for Srinagar (1900–Present)
Month	Jan	Feb	Mar	Apr	May	Jun	Jul	Aug	Sep	Oct	Nov	Dec	Year
Record high °C (°F)	17.2 (63.0)	21.0 (69.8)	28.3 (82.9)	31.1 (88.0)	36.4 (97.5)	37.8 (100.0)	39.5 (103.1)	36.7 (98.1)	35.0 (95.0)	33.9 (93.0)	24.5 (76.1)	18.3 (64.9)	39.5 (103.1)
Mean daily maximum °C (°F)	9.0 (48.2)	11.0 (51.8)	16.0 (60.8)	21.0 (69.8)	25.0 (77.0)	29.0 (84.2)	31.0 (87.8)	31.0 (87.8)	28.0 (82.4)	23.0 (73.4)	16.0 (60.8)	10.0 (50.0)	20.8 (69.5)
Mean daily minimum °C (°F)	−1.9 (28.6)	1.0 (33.8)	4.3 (39.7)	7.8 (46.0)	11.3 (52.3)	15.2 (59.4)	19.0 (66.2)	18.0 (64.4)	14.0 (57.2)	6.2 (43.2)	1.5 (34.7)	−1.6 (29.1)	7.9 (46.2)
Record low °C (°F)	−14.4 (6.1)	−13.8 (7.2)	−6.7 (19.9)	0.0 (32.0)	1.0 (33.8)	7.3 (45.1)	10.0 (50.0)	9.5 (49.1)	4.4 (39.9)	−1.7 (28.9)	−7.8 (18.0)	−12.8 (9.0)	−14.4 (6.1)
Average precipitation mm (inches)	48 (1.9)	68 (2.7)	121 (4.8)	85 (3.3)	68 (2.7)	39 (1.5)	62 (2.4)	76 (3.0)	28 (1.1)	33 (1.3)	28 (1.1)	54 (2.1)	710 (27.9)
Average precipitation days (≥ 1.0 mm)	6.6	7.3	10.2	8.8	8.1	5.7	7.9	6.8	3.5	2.8	2.8	5.1	75.6
Source: HKO

== Places of worship ==
- Jamia Ahlehadees Markazi Masjid Madina Chowk Gow Kadal
- Hazratbal Shrine
- Jamia Masjid, Srinagar, one of the oldest mosques in Kashmir
- Shah-i-Hamadan Mosque
- Shrine of Makhdoom Sahib
- Shankaracharya temple, possibly the oldest shrine in Kashmir
- Khanqah-e-Moula
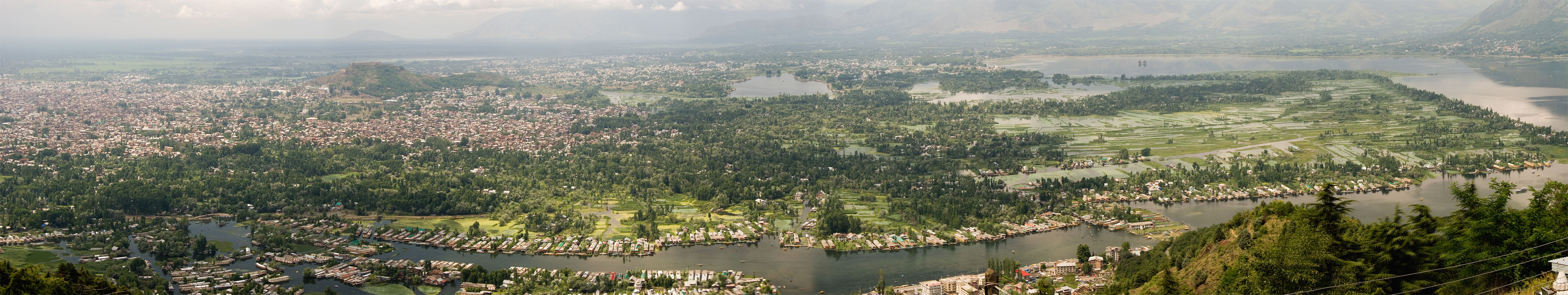
Panoramic view of Dal Lake and the city of Srinagar in Srinagar district.

== See also ==
- List of colleges in Srinagar
- List of schools in Srinagar
