= List of mosques in Jammu and Kashmir =

This is a list of notable Mosques in Jammu and Kashmir:

| Image | Name | Location | Year built (CE) | Notes |
|---|---|---|---|---|
| | Jamia Masjid, Srinagar | Nowhatta, Srinagar | 1402 | Largest Mosque in Jammu and Kashmir, commissioned by Sultan Sikandar at the behest of Mir Mohammad Hamadani, son of Mir Sayyid Ali Hamadani. |
| | Aali Mosque | Eidgah, Srinagar | 1417 | Situated at the premises of Eidgah Shah-i-Hamdan |
| | Hazratbal Shrine | Hazratbal, Srinagar | 1600s | Situated on the northern bank of Dal Lake. The first building of the shrine was constructed in 17th century by Mughal subedar Sadiq Khan during the emperor Shah Jahan's reign. |
| | Khanqah-e-Mu'alla | Zaina kadal, Srinagar | 1395 | Also known as Shah-e-Hamdan Masjid. Situated on the right bank of the river Jhelum, commissioned by Sultan Sikendar in memory of Mir Sayyid Ali Hamadani. |
| | Makhdoom Sahib Shrine | Koh-i-Maran, Srinagar | 1597 | Also known as Ziyarat Makhdoom Sahib, is a mausoleum complex associated with Hamza Makhdoom. Situated on the south-western slope of Koh-i-Maran (Hari Parbat) hill in Srinagar. |
| | Dastgeer Sahib | Khanyar, Srinagar | 1845 | 200-year-old shrine situated in Khanyar. It is associated with Abdul Qadir Gilani. |
| | Ziyarat Naqshband Sahab | Khwaja Bazar, Nowhatta, Srinagar | 1633 | Mosque and Sufi mausoleum of 17th-century Sufi saint Moinuddin Hadi Naqshband. |
| | Charar-e-Sharief shrine | Charari Sharief, Budgam | 1460 | Sufi Muslim shrine and mosque situated in the town of Charari Sharief in Budgam district. It was built to pay homage to Nund Rish. |
| | Jamia Masjid, Shopian | Shopian | 1944 (reconst.) Mughal Period (First est.) | Historic mosque located in the district of Shopian. |
| | Akhund Mullah Shah | Koh-i-Maran, Srinagar | 1649 | Also known as Dara Shikoh Mosque. Built by Dara Shikoh for his spiritual mentor. |
| | Pathar Mosque | Zaina Kadal, Srinagar | 1623 | Mughal era stone mosque, located on the left bank of the River Jhelum, opposite the shrine of Khanqah-e-Moula, built by Mughal Empress Noor Jahan, the wife of Jehangir. |
| | Madin Sahib | Zadibal, Srinagar | 1448 | built by Sultan Zain-ul-Abideen (Budshah). He named it after his teacher Syed Mohammad Madani, who is also buried to the left of the Masjid. |
| | Jamia Masjid Sopore | Sopore | 17th-century | Historic mosque located on the banks of the River Jhelum. Built during the reign of Mughal Emperor Aurangzeb. |
| | Markazi Jamia Masjid Kupwara | Kupwara | 16th Century | Historic mosque whose construction dates back to the 16th century, and which is situated on the banks of the Talri River. |
| | Masjid-e-Murshideen | Kupwara | November 1988 | Founded by Pir Mohammed Shams-ud-Din as a centre for both worship and learning, the mosque’s foundation stone was laid on 19 November 1998 and completed over several years through community contributions. |
| | Jamia Masjid Trehgam | Trehgam | 20th-century (reconst.) 15th-century (est.) | Notable for sharing a common courtyard with a centuries-old Hindu temple and the shrine of Sufi saint Syed Ibrahim Bukhari. |

== See also ==
- Islam in Kashmir
- Imambara Zadibal
