= Makhdoom Sahib Shrine =

Mausoleum complex of Sufi saint Hamza Makhdoom in Srinagar, Jammu and Kashmir.

- زِیارت مخدوٗم صٲب
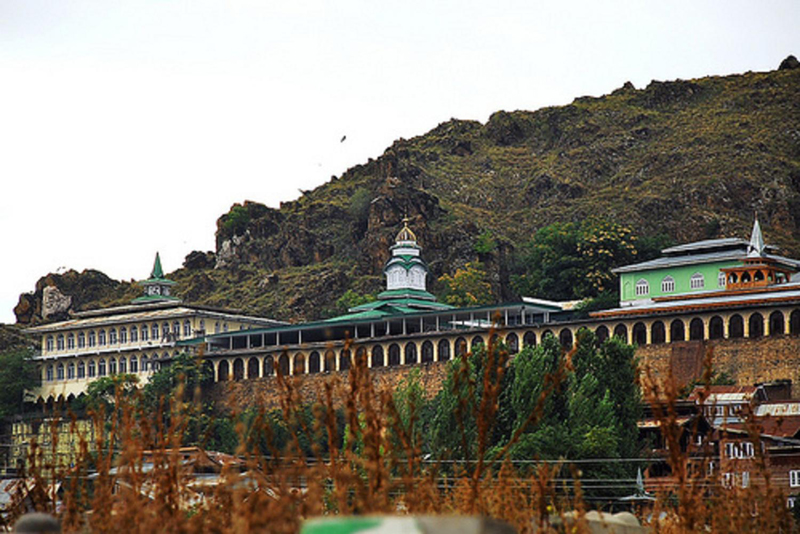
- View of the shrine complex from southern slope

Religion
- Affiliation: Islam
- District: Srinagar district
- Rite: Sufism
- Festival: urs of Hamza Makhdoom (24 Safar)
- Patron: Hamza Makhdoom
- Status: Mausoleum and mosque complex

Location
- Location: Koh-i-Maran, Srinagar
- Country: India
- Interactive map of Makhdoom Sahib Shrine
- Territory: Jammu and Kashmir
- Administration: Jammu and Kashmir Waqf Board
- Coordinates: 34°06′13″N 74°48′55″E

Architecture
- Type: Mausoleum, mosques
- Style: Kashmiri rishi, Mughal
- Founder: Hamza Makhdoom (site of meditation); tomb commissioned by Akbar
- Established: Zakir Mosque: 1347; tomb: 1598

The Makhdoom Sahib Shrine (also known as Ziyarat Makhdoom Sahib) (Note: Kashmiri: زِیارت مخدوٗم صٲب) is a mausoleum complex on the south-western slope of Koh-i-Maran (Hari Parbat) in Srinagar, in the Indian administered union territory of Jammu and Kashmir. It contains the tombs of the 16th-century Sufi figure Hamza Makhdoom (1494–1576) and his disciple Baba Dawood Khaki (d. 1585), and several mosques and other structures. The shrine is regarded as one of the six principal shrines of Srinagar.

The site was used for worship and meditation by Hamza Makhdoom, and Zakir Mosque was built there at his direction. Following his death in 1576, he was buried there, and a tomb was later built over his grave on the orders of the Mughal emperor Akbar. The complex was expanded and restored under successive Mughal, Afghan and Sikh administrations, as well as through local patronage.

The shrine is accessible by stairways from the Bachi Darwaza and Kathi Darwaza gates. Its annual urs on 24 Safar, marking the death anniversary of Hamza Makhdoom, attracts large numbers of pilgrims.

== Location ==
People ascending the south-western slope of Koh-i-Maran from Bachi Darwaza towards the Shrine, with Hari Parbat Fort above, July 1899

The shrine stands on the south-western slope of Koh-i-Maran, below the Hari Parbat fort, at an elevation from which it is visible from many parts of Srinagar. It can be reached through two gates of the Nāgar Nagar rampart: Bachi Darwaza on the south-west and the Kathi Darwaza on the south-east. Both gates are connected to the shrine by long stairways. The Akhund Mullah Shah Mosque, built by Dara Shikoh, is located below the shrine complex.

== History ==
=== Origins ===
In 1347 (748 AH), Sayyid Jalal ud-Din Bukhari is said to have levelled a small area on the south-western slope of Koh-i-Maran for meditation and worship. Hamza Makhdoom, who was born in 1494 (900 AH), later settled in Srinagar after leaving Tujjar and chose the same spot for spiritual retreat, where he was reportedly used to spend periods of seclusion (chilla).

Hamza instructed his disciple Sayyid Mir Khan, who had an interest in masonry, to build a small place of worship. This structure became known as the Zakir Mosque. Another account states that Mir Khan had initially chosen the site for his own burial place but later resumed construction to provide burial space for his teacher as well. The same source credits him with building the shrine's compound wall, 45 feet high.

Hamza Makhdoom died on 23 May 1576 AD (24 Safar 984 AH) and was buried to the south (left) side of the Zakir Mosque.

=== Mughal Period ===
Sources differ on the date of the first tomb. According to Kashir Encyclopedia, the Mughal emperor Akbar ordered a tomb to be built over Hamza Makhdoom's grave in 1597, during the construction of the Nāgar Nagar rampart Alternate sources date its construction to 1590, approximately 14 years after his death.

In 1606, Salar Beigh, a noble in the court of Jahangir, built the Salar Beigh Mosque. Prince Dara Shikoh is said to have built a water reservoir near the Kathi Darwaza approach.

In 1713, further additions were made under Inayatullah Kashmiri, a Mughal governor (subahdar). He built a mosque bearing his name and added porticoes on the western, southern and the eastern sides of the compound wall.

=== Afghan and Sikh periods ===
In 1821, the Afghan governor Atta Muhammad Khan funded renovation work and expanded the shrine complex. He is also reported to have issued coins in the names of Hamza Makhdoom and Nund Rishi.

During Sikh rule, the governor Shaikh Ghulam Muhy-ud-Din (d. 1846) enlarged the complex, repaired its mosques and built a paved staircase leading from Bachi Darwaza. He was later buried within the shrine enclosure.

=== 19th and 20th centuries ===
The shrine viewed from the southeast in 1909.

In 1871–72, Khwaja Ghulam Mohi-ud-Din Gandroo, a local benefactor, funded construction work at the shrine, including the building of a hamam (bath or heating house). Another benefactor, Khwaja Muhammad Sakhi Drabu, installed a silver-plated finial on the pinnacle.

A managing committee (Intizamia Committee) was formed in 1943 and undertook several renovation projects. The eastern stairway was replaced with carved stone steps, and tin sheets were installed over the roofs of the mosques and the main shrine. In 1946, papier-mâché ceiling of the tomb was executed under the master craftsmen Ustad Abdul Ghani, and a walnut-wood latticework (zali pinjrakari) work was fitted to the doors and windows. The Haft Sadat Mosque was reconstructed by 1949.

From 1955, the committee rebuilt the Salar Beigh Mosque, a wooden strcuture that had deteriorated. The project lasted more than two decades and involved levelling part of the hillside, laying concrete slabs and constructing retaining walls. Further additions included the Maryam Mahal, a large corridor and hall for women, and stone paving inlaid with marble and marked to indicate prayer rows. A gateway was constructed from the south-west, named Bab-ul-Sultan. Carved stone paving and lamp posts were installed along the route from the shrine to Kastoor Pend, a viewpoint to its east. A broad staircase was also constructed from Kathi Darwaza.

The complex is managed by the Jammu and Kashmir Waqf Board.

=== Ropeway and income ===
In 2013, a ropeway, approximately 550 meter long, was constructed by the Jammu and Kashmir Cable Car Corporation (JKCCC), connecting the Malkha Cemetery with the shrine complex. The project cost ₹6.5 crore.

According to figures presented in the Jammu and Kashmir Legislative Council, the shrine generated an income of ₹2,57,33,022 during the 2015–2016 financial year.

== Architecture and structures ==
=== Mausoleum ===
The mausoleum contains the graves of Hamza Makhdoom and his disciple Baba Dawood Khaki, whose grave lies to the right of Hamza Makhdoom's. Each grave has an epitaphs on its northern side and is enclosed by a latticework frame. The graves are covered with brocade (zarbaft) and velvet cloth.

The inner walls are panelled with carved walnut wood, while the ceiling features khatamband woodwork and papier-mâché decoration. A glass viewing window allows visitors to view the graves. The corridor surrounding the burial chamber (gulam gardish) is paved with marble. The exterior walls and windows feature wooden latticework (pinjrakari). The roof is four-tiered with a gilded finial.

Ayat al-Kursi embroidered on cloth inside the shrine.

Qasida Wird al-Muridīn inscribed on a wall of the Shrine.

A wall featuring traditional pinjrakari latticework windows and papier-mâché decoration at the Shrine.

=== Mosques and other structures ===
Structure	Description
Zakir Mosque	Oldest mosque in the complex. An inscription dates the mosque to 1564 (972 AH), and expanded in 1547 (954 AH). It has a dome or vaulted roof and four small rooms used for Iʿtikāf.
Salar Beigh Mosque	Built 1606; rebuilt from 1955. Its southern porch features latticework compared with that of the Chashme Shahi pavilion, which overlooks Srinagar
Inayat Khan Mosque	Built in 1712 by Inayatullah Khan; enlarged under Afghan governor Atta Muhammad Khan.
Haft Sadat Mosque (Seven Sayyids' Mosque)	Associated with the graves of seven sayyids and was reconstructed by 1949.
Maryam Mahal (or Masjid Aisha)	Section for women worshippers, rebuilt during the 20th century.
Masjid Jahangir and Masjid Atta Mohammad Khan	Listed among the mosques of the complex.
Courtyard and pond	An open-air courtyard, and a pond in the premises of the shrine
Kastoor pend	An elevated viewpoint and park east of the shrine.

A further mosque associated with Dawood Khaki formerly stood near the Bachi Darwaza entrance. It was taken over and dismantled by the managing committee in 1970, and no remains of the structure survive.

== Burials ==
In addition to Hamza Makhdoom and Baba Dawood Khaki, the shrine complex contains the graves of several other individuals, including Sayyid Mir Khan, Sayyid Nanak Shah, Shaikh Ghulam Muhy-ud-Din (d. 1846), Sheikh Hasan Lalo, the Haft Sadat, or the seven sayyids, identified as Jalal, Baqir, Husayn, Ahmad, Jafar, Ibrahim and Muhammad.

== Urs and observances ==
The annual urs, commemorating the death anniversary of Hamza Makhdoom, is observed during Safar, the second month of the Islamic calendar. The 13-day observances begin on 11 Safar and concludes on 24 Safar. Special prayers are held during the day throughout the period.

The main observance takes place during the night between 23 and 24 Safar and includes prayers that continue throughout the night. It marks the conclusion of the annual urs. The programme includes recitations from the Quran, salawat (blessings upon the Islamic Prophet Muhammad), naʽat (devotional poetry in praise of Muhammad), munajat (supplications) and manqabat (poetry praising Ahl al-Bayt and religious figures), as well as sermons. A gathering for the recitation of Awraad-ul-Fatehah is held after the Isha prayer.

The first day of the observance is designated for men and the second day for women, although both attend on both days. Published accounts estimate that the annual gathering attracts tens of thousands of devotees.

== Cultural significance ==
The shrine holds a prominent place in the religious and social life of many Kashmiri Muslims. According to published accounts, it is also visited throughout the year by people of other faiths. Practices recorded include climbing the stairways on Mondays and Thursdays as part of the fulfilment of vows.

Historically, during natural calamities, special prayer processions were organised in Kashmir. These processions took place at the Eidgah and at the shrines of various Sufi figures, including Hamza Makhdoom. Participants from different parts of the Kashmir Valley reportedly carried earthen pitchers and pails filled with water and poured it into the pond near the shrine.

Visits to the shrine were also traditionally associated with excursions to view the blossoming almond trees below Koh-i-Maran in Badamwari Park.

Studies of religious practices among Kashmiri women have documented visits to prominent shrines, including Makhdoom Sahib, to seek blessings of God through the intercession of the saints buried there.

== Conservation ==
According to the Kashir Encyclopedia, renovation and modernisation projects undertaken during the 20th century altered parts of the shrine's original architectural features. These works reportedly led to removal of traditional woodwork, including lattice windows and balcony carving described as combining Mughal and Afghan influences, and replaced it with modern construction materials, iron grills and railings.

== See also ==
- Hazratbal Shrine
- Khanqah-e-Moula
- Dastgeer Sahib
- Ziyarat Naqshband Sahab
- Bulbul Shah

== Sources ==
- Teng, Muhammad Yusuf (1986). Kạ̄šur Ensāyiklōpīḍiyā: Ās̱ār-e Qadīmah tɨ Fan-e Taʿmīr کٲشر انسائیکلوپیڈیا: آثارِ قدیٖمَہ تٕہ فنِ تعمیر [Kashmiri Encyclopedia: Ancient Remains and Architecture] (in Kashmiri). Vol. 1 (new ed.). Jammu and Kashmir Academy of Art, Culture and Languages. pp. 212–220.
- Sheikh, Bashir Ahmad (2012). The Impact of Sufism on Socio-economic and Cultural Conditions of the Jammu and Kashmir (16th–18th C.). Under the supervision of Dr. S. Liyaqat Hussain Moini. Aligarh U.P.: Centre of Advanced Study Department of History Aligarh Muslim University.
- Smirna Si. The Suhrawardi Shrines: Shaikh Hamza Makhdum and Baba Nasibuddin Ghazi. pp. 44–60.
