= Muharram in Kashmir =

Religious period of mourning for Shia Muslims in Kashmir

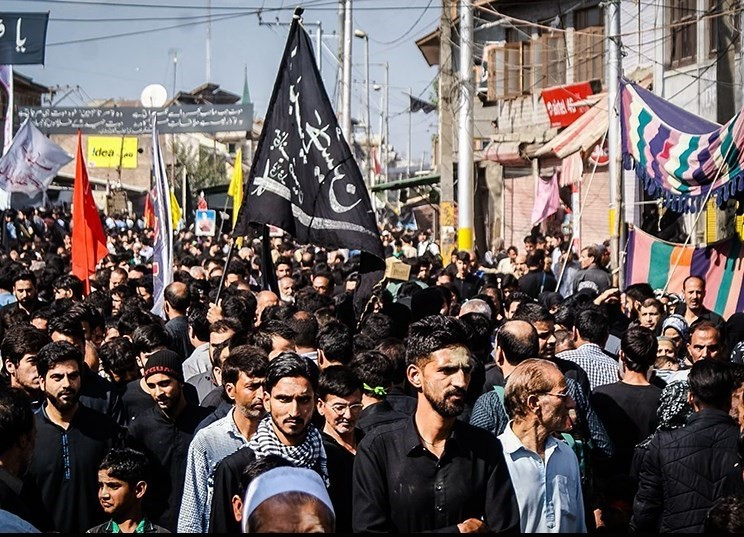
Ashura procession in Kashmir Valley

In Kashmir, the Islamic month of Muharram is observed with deep reverence, particularly by the Shia Muslim community, who commemorate the martyrdom of Husayn ibn Ali at the Battle of Karbala. The observance, called Azadari-i-Muharram, (Note: Urdu: عزاداریِ محرم) is marked by processions, rituals, and expressions of grief and solidarity. However, the practice has faced historical challenges, including restrictions and bans, which have influenced its manifestation in the region.

== Observance and rituals ==
Muharram in Kashmir is marked by solemn mourning rituals observed by the Shia community. The practices include:

- Alam Processions: Processions carrying alams (standards or flags) symbolizing the martyrs of Karbala, especially on 5th of Muharram.
- Zuljanah Procession: A ceremonial procession featuring a decorated replica of Husayn’s horse (Zuljanah), representing the martyr’s journey to Karbala. Usually two main zuljanah processions are observed on Ashura in Kashmir. One in the capital city of Srinagar, and one another in Budgam district. The procession of capital city is authorised to All Jammu and Kashmir Shia Association and Anjuman-e-Sharie Shia Jammu and Kashmir alternately, while procession of budgam is undertaken by Anjuman-e-Sharie Shia, Jammu and Kashmir, alone.
- Nowheh Khawani: Recitation of Kashmiri Nowheh in Kashmiri, and urdu that narrate the suffering of Husayn ibn Ali and his followers, that follows a chest beating ritual like Latmiya.
- Majlis (Religious gathering): Sermons and recitations are held in Imambaras, where scholars recount the events of Karbala and deliver discourses on themes of sacrifice, justice.
- Niyaz and Sabeel: Food and water are distributed as acts of charity, symbolizing the thirst of Husayn ibn Ali and his companions at Karbala.
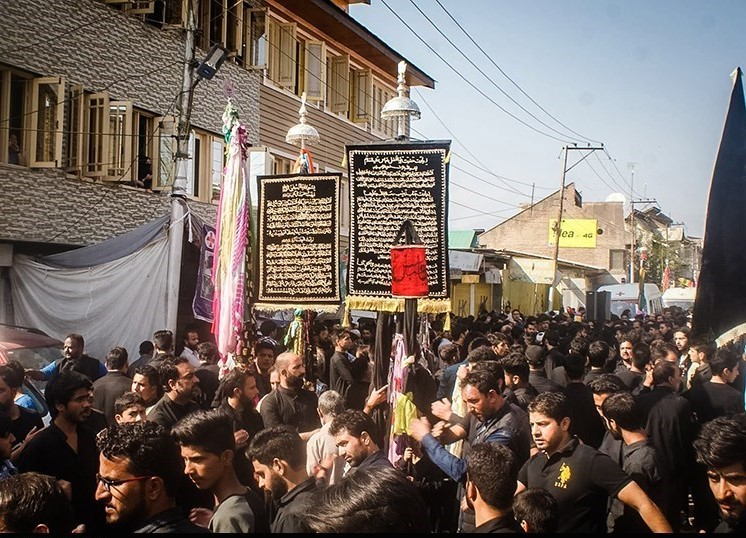
Alam procession in kashmir

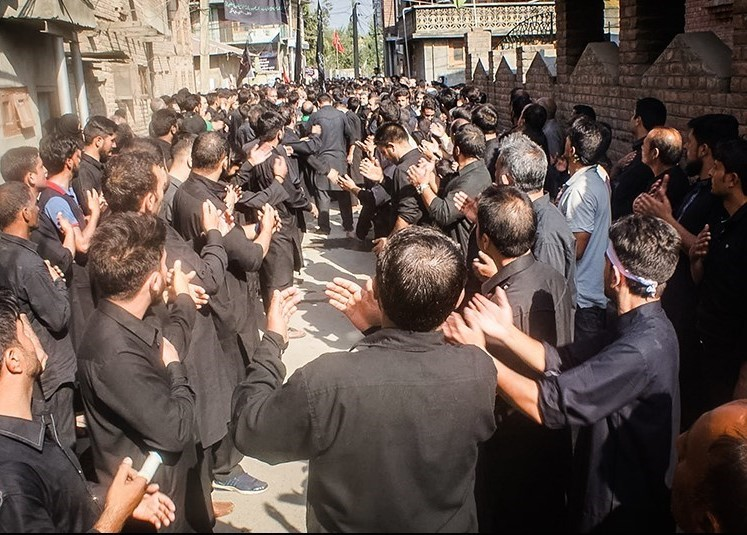
Latmiya (ritual chest beating) in Srinagar

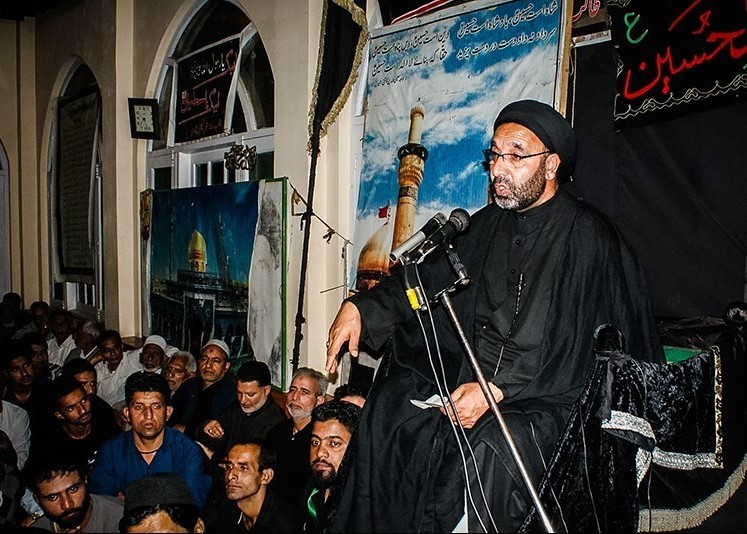
Shia Muslims attending a Majlis in Kashmir, with a cleric delivering a sermon.

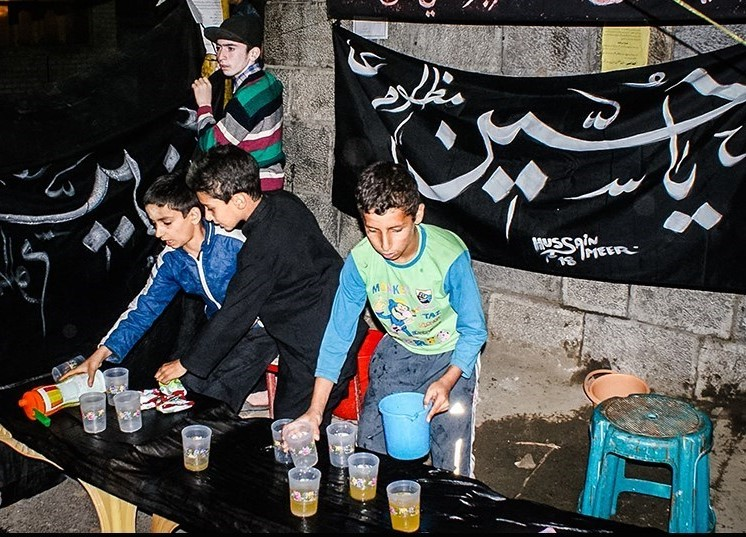
Children serving refreshments at sabeel stalls

Major public processions in Srinagar traditionally began at Abi Guzar, passed through Maisuma, and ended at Zadibal. These processions are the central feature of Muharram observance in Kashmir, usually taking place on the 8th and 10th days of the month and lasting several hours. In addition, smaller processions are held in other districts, including Baramulla, Kulgam, Leh, and Kargil, reflecting the widespread regional participation.

== History ==
The tradition of Muharram processions in Kashmir dates back several centuries. Under the rule of the Dogra kings in the early 20th century, the Shia community faced restrictions on their religious practices. In the 1920s, the Dogra administration mandated that Muharram processions conclude before sunrise, citing concerns over Shia–Sunni tensions. Despite these restrictions, the community continued to observe the month with devotion, often defying the imposed limitations.

For decades, the Government of Jammu and Kashmir had maintained a ban on major mourning processions, a restriction put in place since the rise of insurgency in the region in the 1990s. While smaller gatherings were permitted in predominantly Shia areas like Baramulla, Kulgam, Leh, and Kargil, the traditional route in Srinagar, running from Abi Guzar, through Maisuma, and ending at Imambara in Zadibal, was closed to mourners, often leading to clashes with police forces.

=== Recent developments ===
In 2023, after a hiatus of 34 years, the Jammu and Kashmir administration permitted the 8th Muharram procession along its traditional route in Srinagar. This decision was met with a mix of relief and scepticism within the community. While some viewed it as a restoration of religious rights, others perceived it as a political move to project normalcy in the region.

== Communal harmony and participation ==
In recent years, Muharram observances in Kashmir have often been marked by displays of communal harmony and inter-sect unity. Both Shia and Sunni Muslims have participated jointly in mourning processions, with volunteers from different sects organizing sabeels to distribute refreshments to mourners. The resumption of major processions in Srinagar, including those on the 8th and 10th of Muharram, has also seen the participation and support of Hindu, Sikh, and Kashmiri Pandit residents, reflecting broader social solidarity. Religious leaders and community representatives, through coordination committees and public appeals, have emphasized restraint, mutual respect, and the preservation of Muharram’s sanctity. The events have come to symbolize inter-communal cooperation, peace, and renewed normalcy in the Valley following decades of restrictions.

== See also ==
- Persecution of Kashmiri Shias
- Azadari in Lucknow
