= Sangeen Darwaza =

Historic Gate in Kashmir

- Interactive map of Sangeen Darwaza
- 34.1093442°N 74.8119495°E
- Location: Old city of Srinagar

History
- Built: 16th Century

Sangeen Darwaza (Note: Urdu pronunciation: [səŋɡiːn d̪əɾʋɑːzɑː] ; Kashmiri pronunciation: [sə̃ɡiːn d̪arʋaːzɨ]) is a historic gateway in the old city of Srinagar, in the Indian-administered union territory of Jammu and Kashmir. It is situated on the western side of historic Nāgar Nagar, a fortified settlement established by Mughal emperor Akbar in 16th century at the foothills of Koh-e-Maran. The settlement was enclosed by a defensive rampart known as Kalai, of which Sangeen Darwaza was one of the gateways, alongside Kathi Darwaza, and Bachi Darwaza.

Sangeen Darwaza and Kathi Darwaza are designated as monuments of national importance and are centrally protected monuments.

== History ==
=== Nāgar Nagar Fortification (Kalai) ===
Mughal emperor Akbar, following the Mughal conquest of Kashmir from the Chak dynasty, established Nāgar Nagar (c. 1597) as a fortified settlement at the foothills of Koh-e-Maran. Its defensive rampart, known as Kalai or Faseel-i-Akbari, extended around the hill, with Sangeen darwaza on its western side and Kathi Darwaza on its southern side.

The rampart was described in Kashir Encyclopedia (1989) as approximately 5 km in circumference, 28 feet high and 13 feet thick, with circular bastions at regular intervals, and small openings for defensive purposes. Sangeen Darwaza stands on the western side as part of this fortification, while Kathi Darwaza on the southern side served as principal entrance, and Bachi Darwaza provided another entrance towards the south-west.

The Kalai rampart is distinct from Hari Parbat Fort, which stands on the hilltop and was constructed later under Afghan governor Atta Mohammad Khan.

== Structure ==
Sangeen Darwaza is an arched gateway incoporated into the defensive rampart. It has carved stonework and a structure broadly similar to that of Kathi Darwaza, but is noted for its elaborate carved stonework.
