= Eidgah Shah-i-Hamdan =

Ground for Eid prayers in Srinagar

- عیدگاہ شاہ ہمدان

Religion
- Affiliation: Islam
- Ecclesiastical or organisational status: Eidgah, Musalla
- Governing body: Jammu and Kashmir Waqf Board
- Dedication: Mir Sayyid Ali Hamadani

Location
- Location: Eidgah, Srinagar, Jammu and Kashmir
- Municipality: Srinagar
- Country: India
- Interactive map of Eidgah Shah-i-Hamdan
- Coordinates: 34°06′02″N 74°47′33″E

Eidgah Shah-i-Hamdan (Kashmiri: عیدگاہ شاہ ہمدان) is a historic eidgah (musalla; open-air prayer ground) in Srinagar, Jammu and Kashmir, India. Named in honour of the Persian Sufi mystic and preacher Mir Sayyid Ali Hamadani, it is one of the oldest and largest congregational prayer grounds in the Kashmir Valley. Traditionally, it has been used for congregational prayers on the Islamic festivals of Eid al-Fitr and Eid al-Adha, as well as for other social and communal activities. The Eidgah complex includes Aali Mosque, Eidgah park, and Mazar-e-Shuhada within its premises.

== History ==
According to local historical accounts and, approximately over 400 kanals of land at Eidgah were donated by Mir Mohammad Hamadani, son of Mir Sayyid Ali Hamadani, as a waqf (religious endowment) for public Eid prayers during the 15th century. Local traditional accounts hold that the land was among the jagirs (lang grant) which Hamadani had acquired from Sikandar Shah, in exchange for Laal-e-Badakhshan, a legendary ruby associated with the Badakhshan region. The grounds subsequently served as an important religious and social gathering place.

Over time, parts of the land were reportedly encroached upon. Historian and poet Zareef Ahmad Zareef has stated that Aali Mosque was traditionally believed to have stood near the centre of the original Eidgah ground, but now stands towards one of its corners. In 1975, the government appointed a team led by Munshi Ahmad Ali to identify and document the land belonging to Islamic endowments (Awqaf), including Eidgah.

In 2023, the Jammu and Kashmir Waqf Board officially named the site Eidgah Shah-i-Hamdan in honour of Mir Sayyid Ali Hamadani. During the ceremony, the board laid the foundation stone for a new pulpit (Minbar) at the prayer ground.

== Religious and social use ==
=== Eid prayers and restrictions ===
Eidgah Shah-i-Hamdan has traditionally served as a venue for large congregational prayers on Eid al-Fitr and Eid al-Adha. The gatherings have attracted worshippers from Srinagar and surrounding areas. However, in recent decades, authorities have repeatedly restricted or prohibited Eid congregations at the site, citing security considerations. As of 2026, congregational Eid prayers had not been permitted at the Eidgah for eight consecutive years.

=== Livestock market ===
In the weeks before Eid al-Adha, the Eidgah grounds become one of the largest livestock markets in Kashmir. Traders from different parts of the region bring sheep and goats for sale, while people from Srinagar and nearby areas visit to buy animals for the festival. The market is an important part of Eid preparations and has been a long-standing local tradition.

== Features ==
The Eidgah prayer ground is covers approximately 650 Kanals, Several notables features are located adjacent to the prayer ground within the Eidgah complex:

- Aali Mosque: situated within the premises of Eidgah Shah-i-Hamdan, towards the northern end.
- Pulpit (minbar) and Niche (mihrab): the structure constructed towards the qibla, for khutbah during the Eid prayers. The structure was named after Mir Sayyid Ali Hamadani.
- Mazar-e-Shuhada (Martyr's Graveyard): also known as Shaheed Malguzar is a burial ground established during the Insurgency in Jammu and Kashmir. The Mazar-e-Shuhada is situated towards the western end of the Eidgah prayer ground and contains approximately 1,000 graves of individuals.
- Eidgah Park: located at the southern end of the prayer ground, contains a central pond and serves as a recreational area for the local residents.
- Playground.

== Development and maintenance ==
In 2004, the government proposed a beautification project worth ₹1.72 crore for Eidgah under the integrated Circuit Development Scheme. the proposed works included fencing, park development, footpaths, public amenities, waste-disposal facilities and lighting. In 2006, the grounds were divided into three sections designated for a park, a playground, and a prayer ground.

Despite there initiatives, parts of the complex have continued to face maintenance and infrastructure problems. Reported issues include inadequate waste disposal, waterlogging and blocked drainage channels, which have contributed to the accumulation of rainwater in the playground and other areas.

In 2026, the Waqf Board launched a plantation drive at Eidgah Shah-i-Hamdan as part of a broader environmental programme across waqf-managed properties. The initiative involved the planting of trees within the Eidgah grounds and was intended to promote environmental conservation and landscape improvement.

== Proposed cancer hospital ==
In 2022, the Jammu and Kashmir Waqf Board proposed building a cancer hospital on a part of the Eidgah grounds. The proposal led to debate among local residents, community groups, and political parties., suggesting other waqf owned lands at other locations for the proposal.

== See also ==
- Malkha Cemetery
- Makhdoom Sahib Shrine
- Madin Sahib
- Imambara Zadibal
