= Kathi Darwaza =

Historic Gate in Kashmir

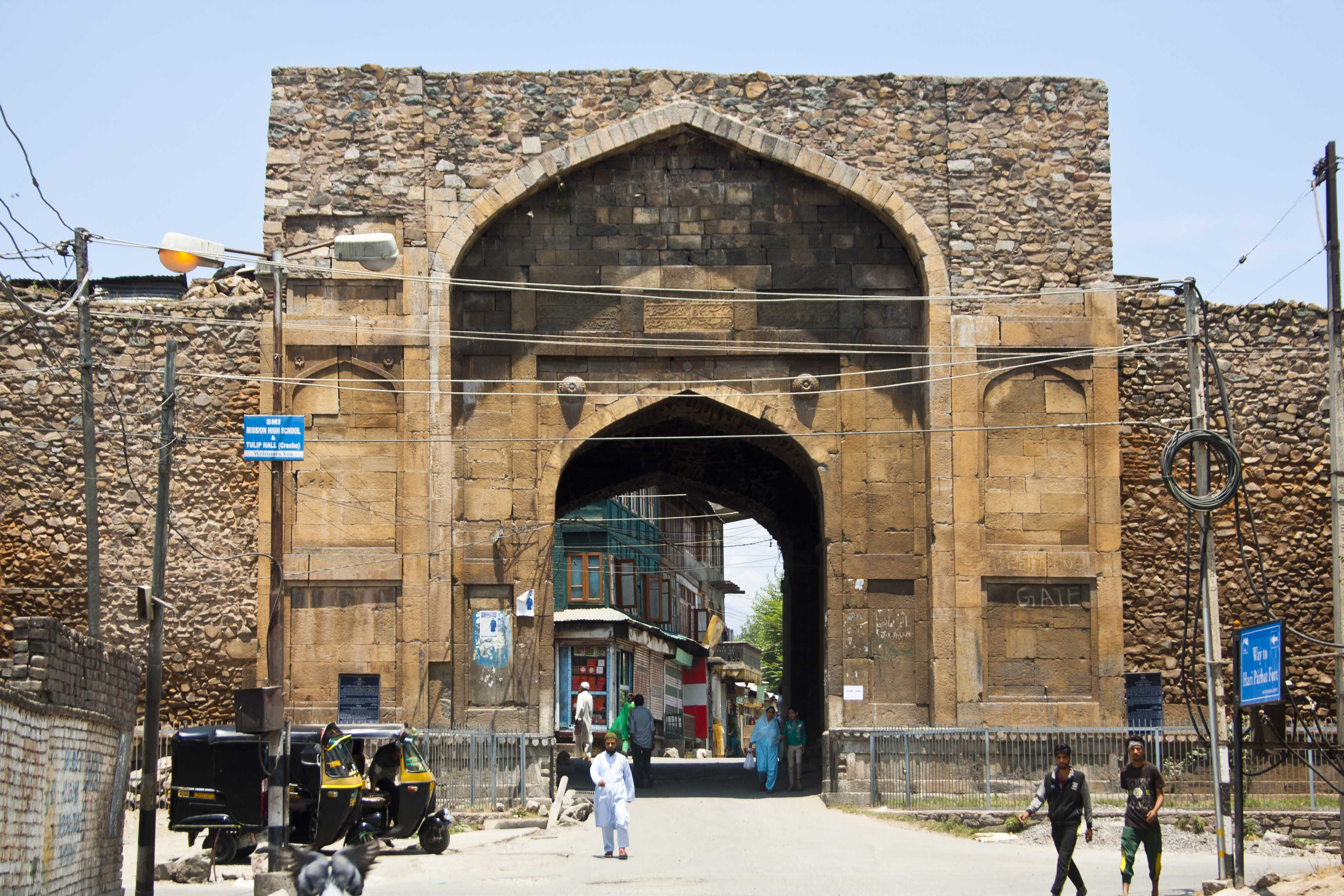
- Interactive map of Kathi Darwaza
- 34.103748°N 74.8215052°E
- Location: Badamwari, Srinagar, Jammu and Kashmir

History
- Built: 16th Century

Site notes
- Height: 12 metres (39 ft)
- Architectural style: Persian Architecture

Kathi Darwaza (Note: Kashmiri: کٲٹھؠ دروازٕ (Kashmiri pronunciation: [kəːʈʰʲ d̪arʋaːzɨ]), Urdu pronunciation: [kɑːʈʰiː d̪əɾʋɑːzɑː]) is a historic gateway in the old city of Srinagar, in the Indian-administered union territory of Jammu and Kashmir. It is the southern entrance to historic Nāgar nagar, a fortified settlement established by Mughal emperor Akbar in 16th century at the foothills of Koh-e-Maran. The settlement was enclosed by a defensive rampart known as Kalai, with Kathi Darwaza, Sangeen Darwaza, and Bachi Darwaza serving as its entrances.

Kathi Darwaza and Sangeen Darwaza are designated as monuments of national importance and are centrally protected monuments.

== History ==
=== Nāgar Nagar Fortification (Kalai) ===
Mughal emperor Akbar, following the Mughal conquest of Kashmir from the Chak dynasty, established Nāgar Nagar (c. 1597) as a fortified settlement at the foothills of Koh-e-Maran. Its defensive rampart, known as Kalai or Faseel-i-Akbari, extended around the hill, with Kathi darwaza on its southern side and Sangeen Darwaza on its western side.

According to the Kashir Encyclopedia (1989), the rampart measured approximately 5 km in circumference. It extended from the graveyard of Bahauddin Ganj Bakhsh in Malkha, south-east towards Saida Kadal and then northwards to Amda Kadal. From there, it continued westwards through Hawal and Badamwari before returning towards the Ganj Bakhsh graveyard.

The rampart was described as approximately 28 feet high and 13 feet thick, with circular bastions at regular intervals. Small openings in the wall served defensive purposes. Kathi Darwaza stands on the southern side as principal entrance, while Sangeen Darwaza on the western side and Bachi darwaza provided another entrance towards the south-west.

The Kalai rampart is distinct from Hari Parbat Fort, which stands on the hilltop. Although fortification of the area began during Akbar's reign, the hilltop fort was constructed under Afghan governor Atta Mohammad Khan.

== Structure ==
Façade of Kathi Darwaza featuring Persian inscriptions and a projecting lotus medallions.

Kathi Darwaza is an arched gateway integrated into the defensive wall, with bastions on either side and raised platforms for watchmen. Its facade features carved stonework, rectangular arched panels and two projecting lotus medallions. Persian inscriptions arranged across three panels in the upper part of the structure record details associated with its construction during Akbar's reign.

According to the Kashir Encyclopedia, the gateway's arch measures approximately 35 feet in height and 30 feet in width. The anterior passage features vaulted ceiling supported by recessed side walls. The side facing the hill is comparatively plain, with staircases on either side leading to a domed chamber above.

Sangeen Darwaza, the other prominent gateway of the rampart, has a similar general structure but is noted for its elaborate carved stonework.

== Sources ==
- Teng, Muhammad Yusuf (1986). Kạ̄šur Ensāyiklōpīḍiyā: Ās̱ār-e Qadīmah tɨ Fan-e Taʿmīr کٲشر انسائیکلوپیڈیا: آثارِ قدیٖمَہ تٕہ فنِ تعمیر [Kashmiri Encyclopedia: Ancient Remains and Architecture] (in Kashmiri). Vol. 1 (new ed.). Jammu and Kashmir Academy of Art, Culture and Languages. pp. 375–378.
