= Jamia Masjid Trehgam =

Mosque in Kupwara, Jammu and Kashmir

- جامع مسجد ترٕٛہ گام
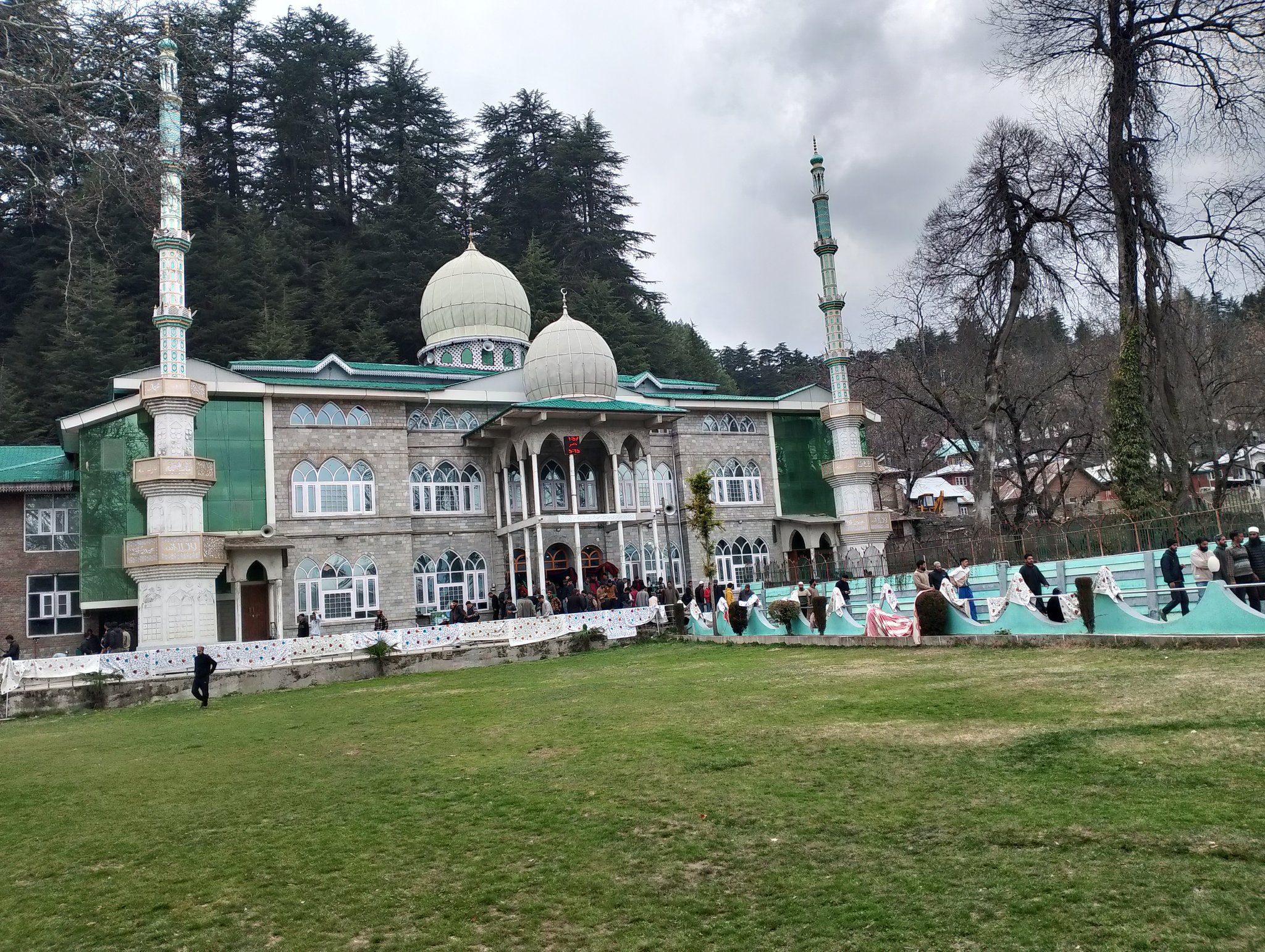

Religion
- Affiliation: Islam
- District: Kupwara

Location
- Location: Trehgam, Kupwara, Jammu and Kashmir
- Interactive map of Jamia Masjid Trehgam
- Coordinates: 34°30′42″N 74°10′17″E

Architecture
- Founder: Syed Ibrahim Bukhari
- Established: 15th-century (first); 20th-century (reconst.)

Specifications
- Dome: 2
- Minaret: 2

Jamia Masjid Trehgam (Kashmiri: جامع مسجد ترٕٛہ گام, lit. 'Grand Mosque of Trehgam') is a congregational mosque located in the village of Trehgam in Kupwara district, in the union territory of Jammu and Kashmir. Traditionally attributed to Syed Ibrahim Bukhari and believed to have been first established in the 15th century (with later reconstruction in the 20th century), the mosque serves as an important religious and community centre for the local Muslim population .

== History and Cultural Significance ==
The mosque is situated in a common courtyard alongside a Hindu temple and a Sufi shrine, thereby symbolizing communal harmony and shared heritage in the region. The available public record does not provide a precise date of construction for Jamia Masjid Trehgam. The adjoining temple is reported by local residents to be several centuries old, with some accounts suggesting a history of around 400 years. The co-existence of the mosque, temple, and shrine within a single compound is described in multiple reports as a long-standing feature of the village.

Local oral traditions suggest that the shared courtyard was maintained intentionally by successive generations to preserve interfaith harmony in the area. The arrangement has continued through various social and political changes in the region.

Local oral traditions attribute the establishment of the mosque to Syed Abdullah Bukhari, whose shrine stands beside the mosque.

== Religious and social role ==
The mosque functions as a Friday congregational mosque (Jamia masjid) for the local Muslim population. Media sources report that it remains active in conducting daily prayers, Friday sermons, and religious activities. The shared compound and visible proximity with a temple is also sometimes leveraged in local narratives to advance communal unity and religious coexistence. Community leaders and clerics from both faiths have been quoted in media sources emphasizing the location’s symbolic value as a representation of peace and mutual respect.

== See also ==
- Jamia Masjid, Srinagar
- Jamia Masjid, Shopian
