= Zadibal =

Locality in Jammu and Kashmir, India

- Interactive map of Zadibal
- Coordinates: 34.112778°N 74.804167°E
- Country: India
- Union Territory: Jammu & Kashmir
- Division: Kashmir
- District: Srinagar

Government
  - Type: Government of Jammu and Kashmir
  - Body: Srinagar Municipal Corporation

Languages
  - Spoken: Kashmiri, Urdu
- Time zone: UTC+5:30 (IST)
- Postal code: 190011
- Area code: 0194
- Vehicle registration: JK 01

Zadibal (Note: Urdu pronunciation: [zəɖiːbəl] ; Kashmiri pronunciation: [zəɖʲbal]) is a locality and notified area in Srinagar, Jammu and Kashmir, India. Located on the eastern banks of the Khushal Sar lake, Zadibal is one of the historic residential areas of the city and forms part of the Zadibal Assembly constituency. The locality is mostly inhabited by the Shia muslims and is noted for its religious and cultural heritage, particularly the Imambara Zadibal, one of the oldest and most significant Husayniyya in Kashmir.

== Geography ==
Zadibal is located in the northern part of Srinagar at approximately 34.112778°N 74.804167°E. It lies 6 km (3.7 mi) towards North from district headquarters in Srinagar. The area is bounded by Nowshera towards North, Hawal and Nowhatta towards South, Lal Bazar and Badamwari towards East and Khushal Sar Lake towards West.

== History ==
Zadibal has historically been an important locality in Srinagar and forms part of the city's older urban landscape. The area developed in proximity to historic routes, settlements, and water bodies that shaped the growth of Srinagar from the medieval period onward. Its location near Khushal Sar and other historic neighbourhoods contributed to its importance as a residential and cultural centre. The locality is traditionally linked to Mir Shams-ud-Din Araqi (d. 1526), a mystic associated with Noorbakhshia order, whose activities in the Kashmir Valley are documented in historical sources from late 15th and early 16th centuries. His shrine in Zadibal remains a notable religious and historical landmark, although his remains were later exhumed and reinterred at Chadoora in Budgam district.

Like other historic neighbourhoods of Srinagar, Zadibal experienced political, social, and cultural changes under Mughal, Afghan, Sikh, and Dogra rule. Throughout these periods, its religious institutions and community networks contributed to the locality's development and to the broader cultural landscape of the Kashmir Valley.

== Demographics ==
Zadibal has historically been associated with Srinagar's Muslim population and remains one of the principal centres of Shia religious and cultural life in Kashmir. The locality is also home to residents from diverse social and occupational backgrounds. Historically residents of the area were engaged in a variety of occupations, including shawl weaving, Papier-mâché craftmanship, trade, and traditional medicine.

== Landmarks ==
- Imambara Zadibal: built in 1518 CE, it is the principal landmark of the locality and is regarded as one of the oldest imambara in Kashmir. It serves as a major centre for religious gatherings, particularly during Muharram and other occasions observed by the Shia Muslim community.
- Mausoleum of Mir Shams-ud-Din Araqi
- Tomb and Mosque of Madin Sahib
- Khushal Sar lake

== See also ==
- Nowshera, Srinagar
- Soura
- Lal Bazar
