= Aali Mosque =

Historic congregational mosque in Srinagar, kashmir

- عٲلِ مٔشِـیٖـد
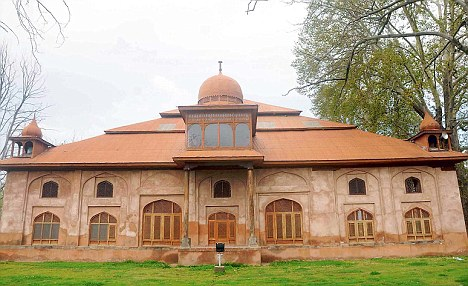
- The mosque exterior, in 2014

- Location in Jammu and Kashmir

Religion
- Affiliation: Islam
- District: Srinagar district
- Ecclesiastical or organisational status: Mosque
- Year consecrated: 1395
- Status: Active

Location
- Location: Eidgah, Srinagar
- Country: India
- Interactive map of Aali Mosque
- Territory: Jammu and Kashmir
- Administration: Aawami Action Committee
- Coordinates: 34°06′18″N 74°47′39″E

Architecture
- Type: Mosque architecture
- Style: Kashmiri architecture, Central Asian influences
- Founder: Ali Shah Miri
- Completed: c. 1395 CE; or; c. 1471

Specifications
- Capacity: 2,500 worshippers
- Length: 67 m (220 ft)
- Width: 41 m (135 ft)
- Interior area: 1,844 m^{2} (19,850 sq ft)
- Dome: 1
- Spire: 4

Aali Mosque (Kashmiri: عٲلِ مٔشِـیٖـد, Urdu: عالی مسجد) (Note: Urdu pronunciation: [ɑːliː məsd͡ʒɪd̪] ; Kashmiri pronunciation: [əːlʲ məʃiːd̪]) is a historic congregational mosque located within the Eidgah Shah-i-Hamadan complex in Srinagar, Jammu and Kashmir, India. It is one of the largest mosques in the Kashmir Valley and is generally regarded as the second-largest mosque in Srinagar after the Jamia Masjid of Srinagar. The mosque is noted for its traditional Kashmiri wooden architecture, large hypostyle prayer hall, and historical association with the Shah Mir dynasty of the Kashmir Sultanate.

== History ==
The origins of Aali Masjid are subject to differing historical traditions. According to traditional Kashmiri chronicles, the mosque was built in 1395 CE by Sultan Ali Shah Miri, the elder brother of Sultan Zayn al-Abidin (Budshah), and was named after the ruler. Another tradition attributes its construction, or a major phase of rebuilding, to 1471 CE during the reign of Sultan Hasan Shah Miri, associating the mosque with the Persian Sufi saint Mir Sayyid Ali Hamadani, after whom the Eidgah complex is also named.

Over the centuries, the mosque underwent several episodes of destruction, reconstruction, and renovation. Architectural additions from later periods, including the Mughal and Afghan eras, altered aspects of the original structure. Historical accounts indicate that extensive repairs were carried out during the Mughal period and that subsequent rebuilding took place during Afghan rule in Kashmir.

The mosque, along with the adjoining Eidgah grounds, has repeatedly remained restricted for several years during the twentieth century following political upheavals and changes in administration. As of 2026, the mosque is undergoing restoration work with support from government agencies and heritage organisations.

== Architecture ==
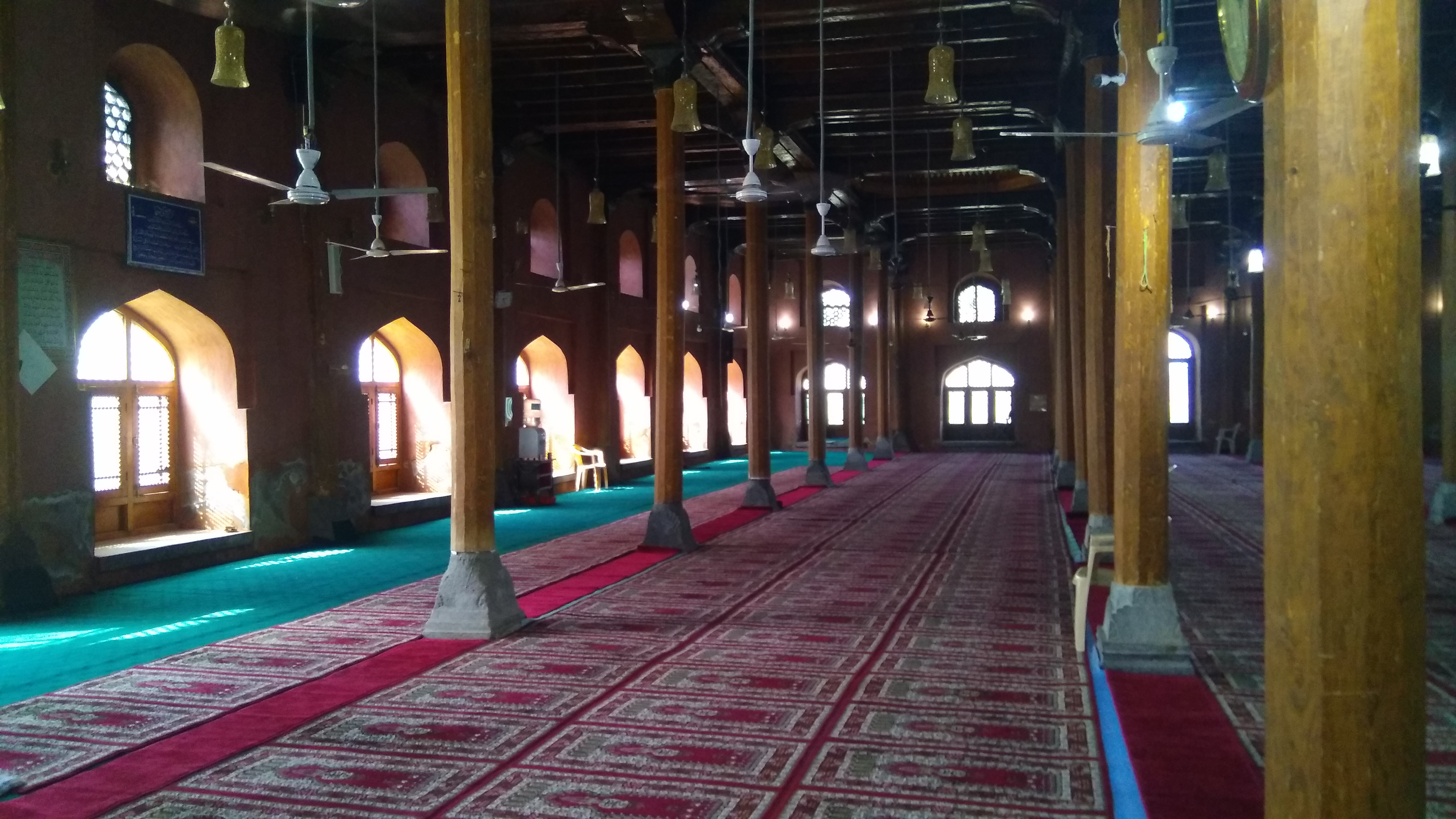
Aali Mosque prayer hall

Aali Mosque is considered one of the finest surviving examples of Kashmiri wooden vernacular architecture, displaying a synthesis of indigenous building traditions and influences from Central Asia and Iran.

The mosque is constructed on a modular grid plan and is supported by approximately 151 deodar wooden columns, each resting on carved stone pedestals. The columns measure about 5 metres (16 ft) in height and approximately 0.95 metres (3 ft 1 in) in diameter. The main prayer hall measures roughly 61.2 metres (201 ft) by 20.5 metres (67 ft) and is arranged as a hypostyle hall. The mosque occupies an area of approximately 1,844 square metres (19,850 sq ft).

Its architectural features include pinjrakari (wooden latticework), a six-stepped pulpit made of Devri stone, traditional Kashmiri roofing elements, and intricately crafted interior woodwork. Historical descriptions also refer to a central dome and corner spires that were added during later phases of construction. The interior ceiling historically featured a vas-talav design, a coffered wooden ceiling formed by parallel rows of timber. The structure could accommodate approximately 2,500 worshippers.

== Architectural evolution ==
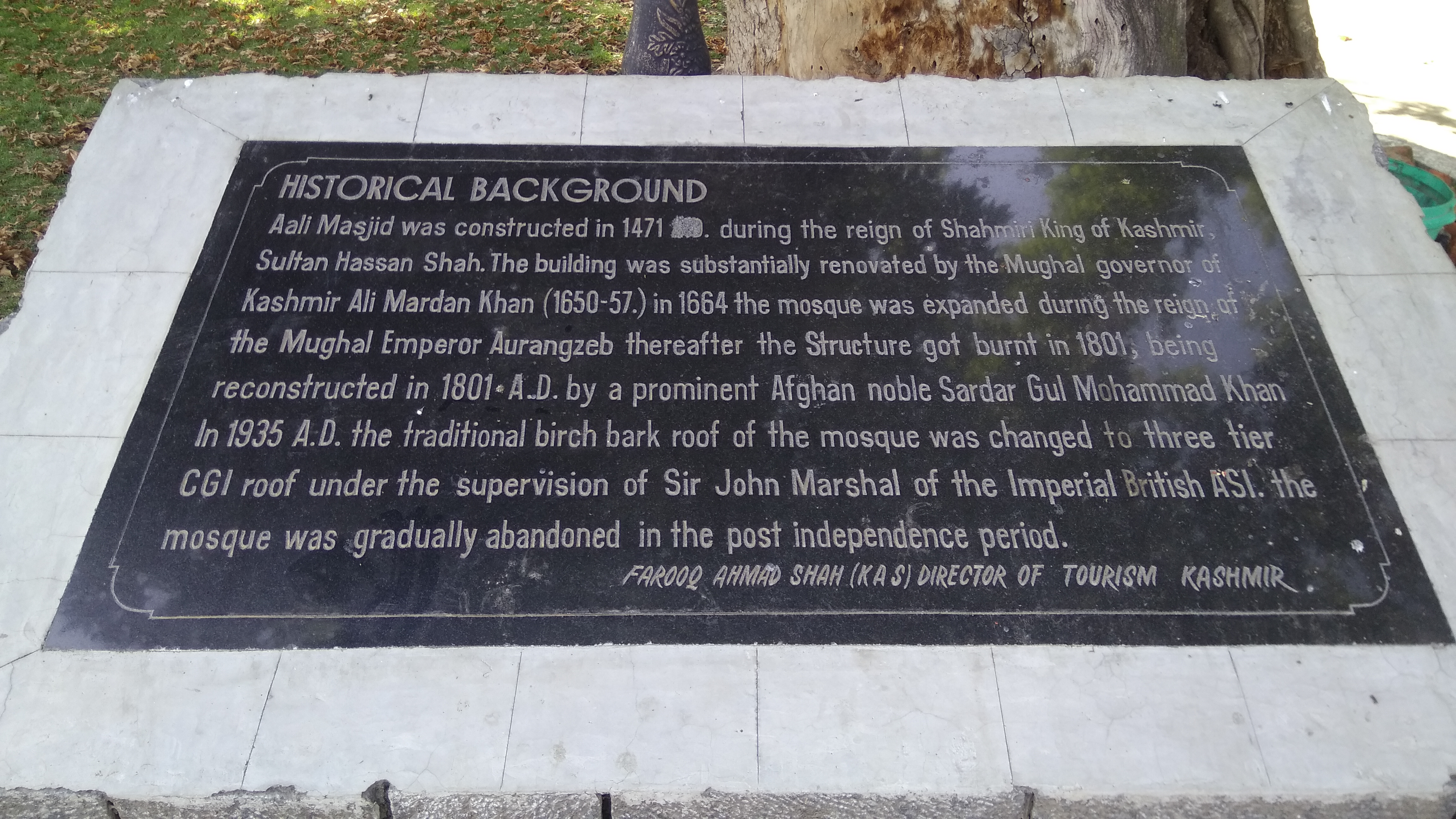
Foundation Stone at Aali Masjid describing the historical background

The architectural appearance of Aali Mosque shows successive periods of modification over centuries under different eras. During the Mughal era, ornamental stone bases with palmette mottifs were added to the wooden columns, while portions of the exterior were enhanced with stucco decoration and recessed arches.

In 2020s, additional repairs and alterations introduced new roofing elements and roof pavilions. Some of these changes were carried out under the supervision of the Archaeological Survey of India and other conservation authorities. As a result of these interventions, the mosque today exhibits architectural features from multiple historical periods, rather than representing a intact fifteenth-century structure.

== Recent conservation ==
In 2020s, the Government of Jammu and Kashmir approved a conservation and development project for Aali Mosque as part of a broader project for preserving heritage sites across Jammu and Kashmir. The project, implemented through the Directorate of Archives, Archaeology and Museums, included structural repairs, roofing work, and floor treatment.

=== Conservation concerns and controversy ===
The Indian National Trust for Art and Cultural Heritage (INTACH) has expressed concerns regarding the recent restoration works, including the use of cement concrete, modifications to the roof, and installation of khatamband ceiling panels, may effect the mosque's historical and architectural authenticity. Concerns have also been raised regarding altering the historic roof style and the covering of the traditional vas-talav ceiling.

Government officials involved in the project have said that the restoration measures were undertaken to address structural deterioration, moisture-related damage, and the long-term conservation needs of the mosque.

== See also ==
- Islam in India
- List of mosques in Jammu and Kashmir
