= Imambara Zadibal =

Historic Husayniyya in Zadibal, Kashmir, India

Imambara Qadeem Zadibal
- امام بارگاہ زڈی بل

Religion
- Affiliation: Shia Islam
- Region: Kashmir
- Rite: Mourning of Muharram
- Ecclesiastical or organisational status: Husayniyya

Location
- Location: Zadibal, Srinagar, Jammu and Kashmir
- Country: India
- Interactive map showing Imambara Zadibal in Srinagar
- Coordinates: 34°06′39″N 74°48′10″E

Architecture
- Style: Persian architecture
- Founder: Kaji Chak
- Established: 1518

Specifications
- Dome: 1
- Minaret: 2

Imambara Zadibal (Note: Urdu: امام باڑہ زڈی بل; pronounced [ɪmaːm ˈbaːɽə zɔːdɪbaːl], locally known as ماتم سرائے, Matam Sarai, 'Place of mourning' (in Kashmiri)) also known as Imambara Qadeem (Note: Also spelled 'Imam Bargah Qadeem') or M'ārak-i-Zadibal, is one of the oldest and most prominent Husayniyya (Note: Kashmiri: Maraak, Matam Sarai or Aza Khane; lit.: Place of mourning) in the Kashmir Valley. It was originally constructed in 1518 CE by Kaji Chak, a minister during the reign of Sultan Muhammad Shah. The Imambara holds a central place in the observance of Muharram in Kashmir, serving as the focal point for mourning processions and majalis. It is located in the Zadibal area of Srinagar, to the west side of Hari Parbat fort.

== History ==
Local and secondary sources date the original foundation of the Imambara to the early 16th century. According to several accounts the structure was founded in 1518, by Kaji (Qazi) Chak, a minister in the court of Sultan Muhammad Shah. However, other sources state the construction date was 1527.

=== Destruction and reconstruction ===
The Imambara has been subjected to multiple incidents of arson and destruction throughout its history, with some sources stating eleven instances, the last major burning occurring in 1872 CE during the Dogra period. Among the older Shia religious structures of Srinagar, Imambara Zadibal is the only one that has been fully rebuilt, whereas others have been redesigned or modified at different times.

== Architecture ==
The Imambara Zadibal is a two-storey structure that reflects a combination of Persian architectural influence and traditional Kashmiri construction techniques. The building features a central dome flanked by two slender minarets, forming a symmetrical design consistent with Persian-style religious architecture.

The central prayer hall has a high ceiling supported by wooden pillars, with walls decorated with calligraphic inscriptions and floral motifs. Surrounding the hall on all sides are smaller rooms, which serve functional purposes for ritual and administrative activities. The main entrance consists of a large carved gateway featuring traditional ornamental designs.

A staircase provides access to the second floor, which includes additional rooms and a balcony overlooking the hall, allowing extra space for congregants during gatherings. The interior also features papier-mâché panels and khatamband (geometric woodwork) ceilings, representative of local craftsmanship.

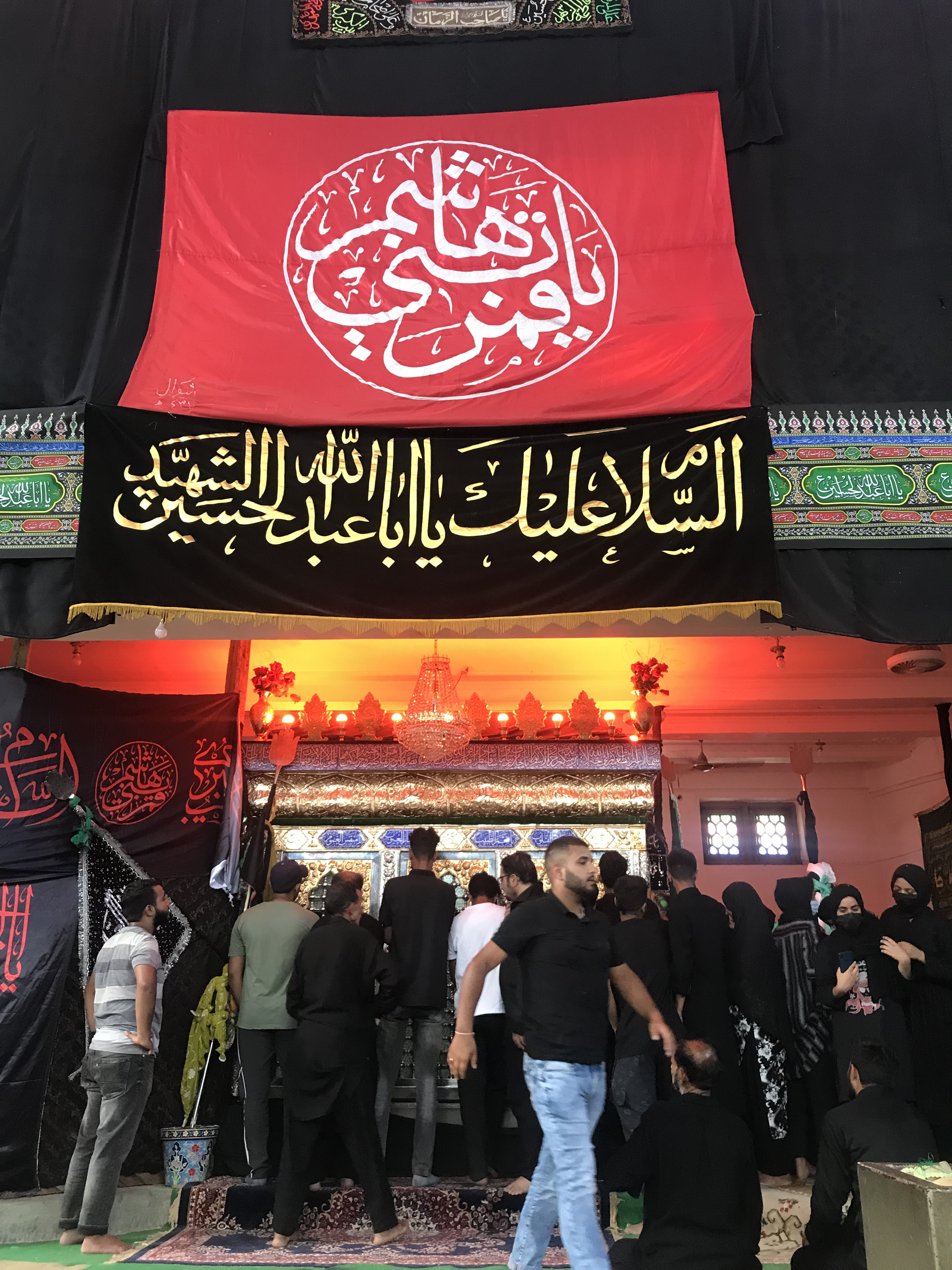
Shia Muslims visiting Zarih, housed within the Imambara Zadibal

The Imambara houses a Zarih, installed in 2018, designed in a modern Persian style to enclose and protect the holy relics. The building is designed to accommodate over 32,000 visitors at a time, particularly during major religious events such as mourning of Muharram.

== Observances ==
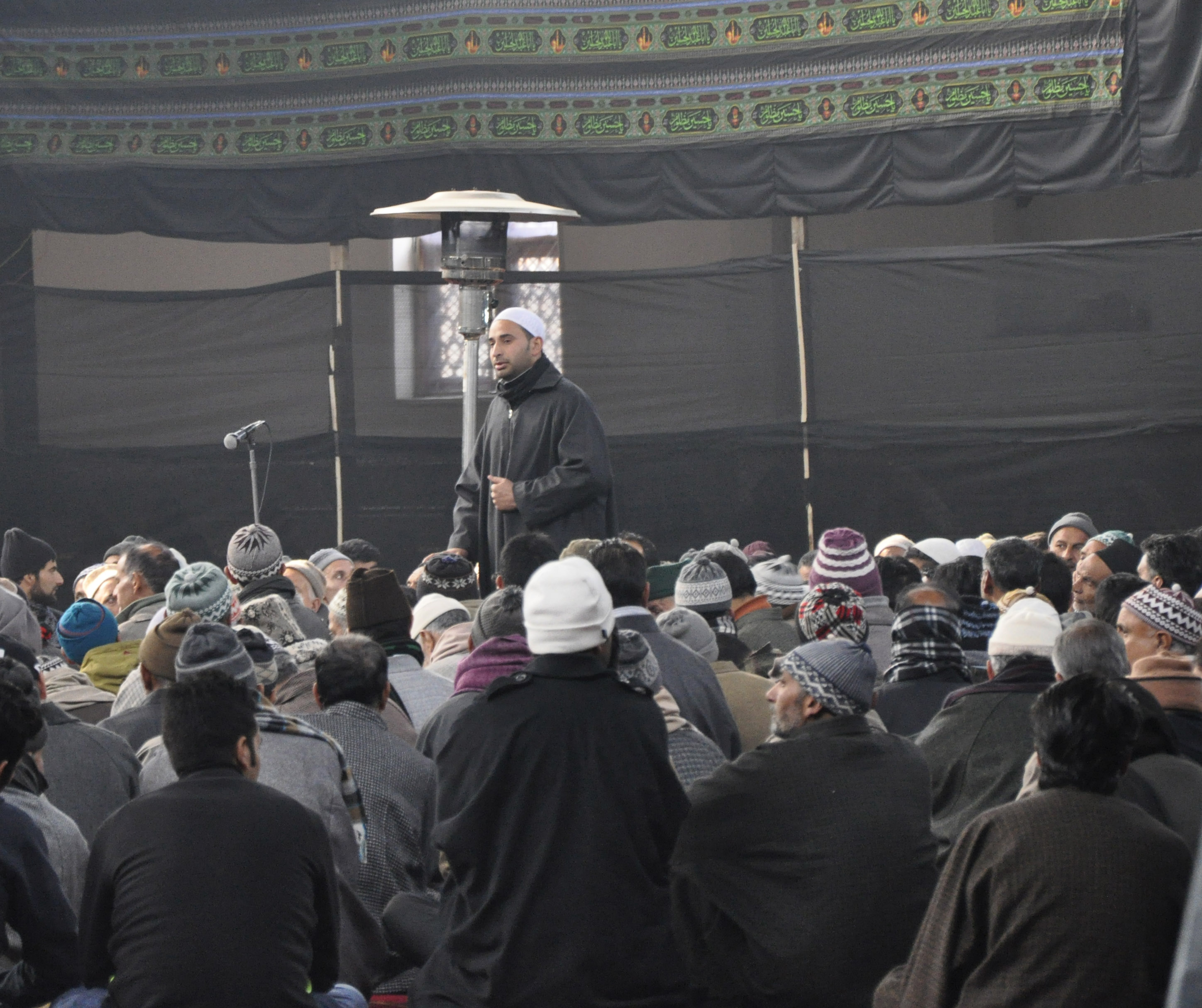
Religious gathering (Majlis) in Imambara Zadibal, in 2014

Shia Muslims are a minority in Kashmir. During the first 10 days of Muharram, Imambara Zadibal functions as a centre for mourning and religious gatherings (Majlis) in Zadibal. Mourners (Azadars) participate in the observances, typically joining processions from areas such as Bota Kadal, Lalbazar and finishing on the day of Ashura with the Zuljanah procession and parades through the streets of Zadibal ending at the Imambara.

The mourning period extends from first day of Muharram to Rabi al Awwal, after which Eid e Shuja, is celebrated. This marks the end of the two-month mourning period.

== Administration and Recent Developments ==
The Imambara Zadibal is maintained by the Jammu and Kashmir Shia Association under the supervision of the Waqf Board. In 2023, the government allowed the resumption of traditional mourning processions through the old city for the first time in three decades. Government officials have periodically visited Imambara Zadibal to review facilities and oversee arrangements for Muharram observances.
