= Maisuma =

- Neighbourhood
- Location in Jammu and Kashmir, India Maisuma (India)
- Coordinates: 34.07°N 74.80°E
- Country: India
- Union territory: Jammu and Kashmir
- District: Srinagar

Languages
  - Official: Kashmiri, Urdu, Hindi, Dogri, English
  - Local: Kashmiri
- Time zone: UTC+5:30 (IST)
- PIN: 190001
- Vehicle registration: JK01

Maisuma (Urdu pronunciation: [mɑːiːsʊmɑː] ; Kashmiri pronunciation: [maːjsum]) is a densely populated neighborhood of Srinagar in the Indian union territory of Jammu and Kashmir which is bordered on the north by Gawkadal bridge and on the South by Lal Chowk. River Jhelum forms it western border.

== Origin of name ==
The name Maisuma comes for its Sanskrit name Makshika Swamin.

== History ==
Historically, Maisuma actually is the name of the entire area that is more or less an island that forms the center of present-day city of Srinagar.
In other words, historical Maisuma includes Srinagar Golf Course, Polo Ground, S.P and Women's college, Bar Bar Shah, entire neighborhood of Amira Kadal including old Court Complexes, Tyndale Biscoe School, Abi Guzar and entire Residency Road all the way up to Door Darshan centre.
It is actually an island that is enclosed by Jhelum River and Tsoont Kol (Kashmiri apple orchard canal) river. Tsoont Kol normally drains excess flow from Dal Lake near Dalgate and it carries that water into Jhelum near Zero Bridge in South but it also goes north and then bends west around the Srinagar Golf Course and empties into Jhelum near Gaw Kadal opposite the Sher Garhi Palace. Tsoont Kol's old name is Mahasarit and at the confluence of this river and Wyeth near Gaw Kadal bridge.
According to Stein there was an important Tirath in ancient times. Kalhana mentions a cremation ground (Shamshan Bhomi) in this area where Uccala was cremated in 1111 AD after he had been assassinated. According to M.A Stein, this cremation ground was still functional up until Dogra times. Prior and during the Dogra rule Maisuma was a designated prostitution area where licensed prostitutes were allowed to work and was a known area for prostitution and popular among visitors
