= Hari Parbat Fort =

Fort on Hari Parbat hill in Srinagar, India

- Hari Parbat, Srinagar, Jammu and Kashmir in India
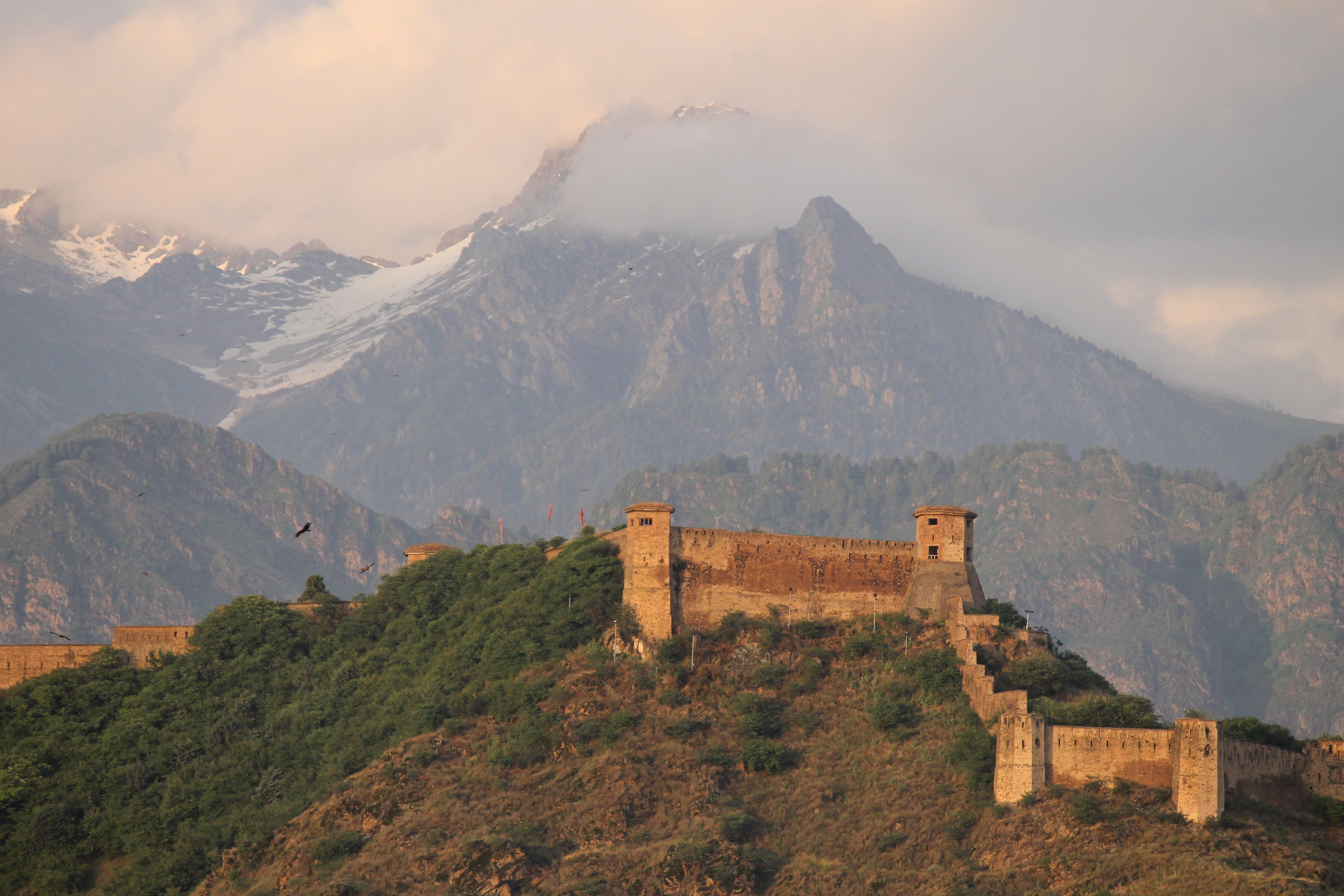
- Hari Parbat Fort with the snow-covered Mount Mahadev in the background

Site information
- Website: https://srinagar.nic.in/tourist-place/hari-parbat-fort/

Location
- Coordinates: 34°6′21″N 74°48′58″E

Site history
- Built by: Akbar, Atta Mohammad Khan

Hari Parbat Fort is a historical fortification atop the Hari Parbat hill in Srinagar, Jammu and Kashmir, India. The fort was built during the late 18th/early 19th century by Atta Mohammad Khan, governor of Kashmir under Durrani rule. The fort's rampart dates earlier to the late 16th century, from a non-extant fortification built by Mughal emperor Akbar.

== History ==
Following the Mughal conquest of Kashmir, Akbar carried out his first architectural project in Srinagar of creating a fortress atop Hari Parbat. This was a walled city called Nāgar Nagar (c. 1597), which acted as the centre of Mughal administration in Kashmir. Akbar employed 200 stonemasons from outside Kashmir to build the fort, since stonemasonry was a foreign practice to the region (the indigenous building tradition was woodworking). This fortification was built with gray limestones. Akbar is known to have laid a garden in this fort; it is the only palace-garden mentioned in the Tuzuk-i-Jahangiri (memoirs of his son and successor Jahangir). Jahangir ordered the completion of certain unfinished portions of the fort, as well as renovations to Akbar's garden and some of the fort's palace buildings, on a visit to Srinagar in 1620. He named the renovated garden Nur Afza (light-increasing). These works were carried out by Mutamad Khan. The garden also earned the admiration of Jahangir's successor Shah Jahan, during a visit in 1640.

Of the walled city, only the rampart and two gateways survive; the Sangeen Darwaza and the Kathi Darwaza. The rampart encloses a more recent fortification, built by Atta Mohammad Khan, the longest-serving governor of Kashmir under the Afghan Durrani Empire. Atta Mohammad Khan built the fort during his tenure between 1795 and 1806 CE, as part of a bid for independent rule. The Durrani fort structure utilizes the same construction method as the Akbar-era ramparts of Nāgar Nagar (stone rubble masonry). Hamdani notes that the Durrani fort displays less strength and durability than the Mughal structures, opining that this may have been due to the turbulent and ephemeral nature of Afghan rule in Kashmir.

The fort later passed into the hands of the Sikh Empire. The defeat of the Sikhs by the British resulted in the 1846 Treaty of Lahore; one of its terms was that several Sikh holdings, including the Hari Parbat fort, would be ceded to Gulab Singh, who had aided the British victory. Gulab Singh's forces occupied the fort, but the Sikh governor of Kashmir Sheikh Imamuddin, put up a resistance and besieged the fort. By 23 October 1846, Imamuddin lifted the siege and surrendered, allowing Gulab Singh to fully take possession of the fort and province.

In 2021, the Indian flag was hoisted at the fort to celebrate India's 75th anniversary of Independence Day.

As of 2021, the fort was occupied by the CRPF. The fort is maintained by the Archaeological Survey of India.

== Bibliography ==
- Hamdani, Hakim Sameer (2021), The syncretic traditions of Islamic religious architecture of Kashmir (early 14th-18th century), London, New York: Routledge, ISBN 978-1-003-09652-8
