= Trehgam =

- Town
- Location in Jammu and Kashmir, India Trehgam (India)
- Coordinates: 34.62°N 74.03°E
- Country: India
- Union Territory: Jammu and Kashmir
- District: Kupwara

Population (2011)
  - Total: 15,587

Languages
  - Official: Kashmiri, Urdu, Hindi, Dogri, English
- Time zone: UTC+5:30 (IST)
- PIN: 193224

Trehgam is a town in Kupwara district of the Indian union territory of Jammu and Kashmir. The village is located at a distance of 7 km (4.3 mi) from district headquarters Kupwara town. Trehgam has recently been carved out as the sixth constituency of District Kupwara.

Trehgam hamlet shares a common yard with a Hindu temple and nearby there is a shrine of a Sufi saint Syed Ibrahim Bukhari (RA). The three religious entities—Shiv temple, Grand Mosque and the Shrine—are in a row and in front of them there's a famous pond which is the main source of water for almost half a dozen nearby villages.

Trehgam, popularly known as the mother of Kashmir's resistance movement, is the birthplace of Muhammad Maqbool Bhat, who was hanged in 1984 in Delhi's Tihar Jail. His family still lives in the village.

The pond is believed to be thousand year old and is currently the main source of water for almost half a dozen nearby villages.

== Demographics ==
According to the 2011 census of India, Trehgam has 1258 households. The literacy rate of Trehgam was 75.54% compared to 67.16% of Jammu and Kashmir. In Trehgam, Male literacy stands at 82.6% while the female literacy rate was 66.09%.

Demographics (2011 Census)
	Total	Male	Female
Population	15587	8705	6882
Children aged below 6 years	3622	1860	1762
Scheduled caste	4	4	0
Scheduled tribe	11	5	6
Literacy	75.54%	82.6%	66.09%
Workers (all)	3538	2940	598
Main workers (all)	2419	2175	244
Marginal workers (total)	6528	5223	1305

Religion in Trehgam (2011)
1. Islam (91.3%)
2. Hinduism (6.86%)
3. Sikhism (1.39%)
4. Christianity (0.18%)
5. Buddhism (0.01%)
6. Jainism (0.02%)
7. Not Stated (0.30%)

== Transport ==
=== Rail ===
The nearest railway stations to Trehgam are Sopore railway station and Baramulla railway station both located at a distance of 47 km (29 mi) from Trehgam.

=== Air ===
The nearest airport is Srinagar International Airport located at a distance of 90 km (56 mi).

== See also ==
- Lolab Valley
- Gurez
- Tulail Valley
