= Hari Parbat =

Prominent hill in Srinagar, India

Coordinates: 34°6′19″N 74°48′58″E

- Koh-i-Maran
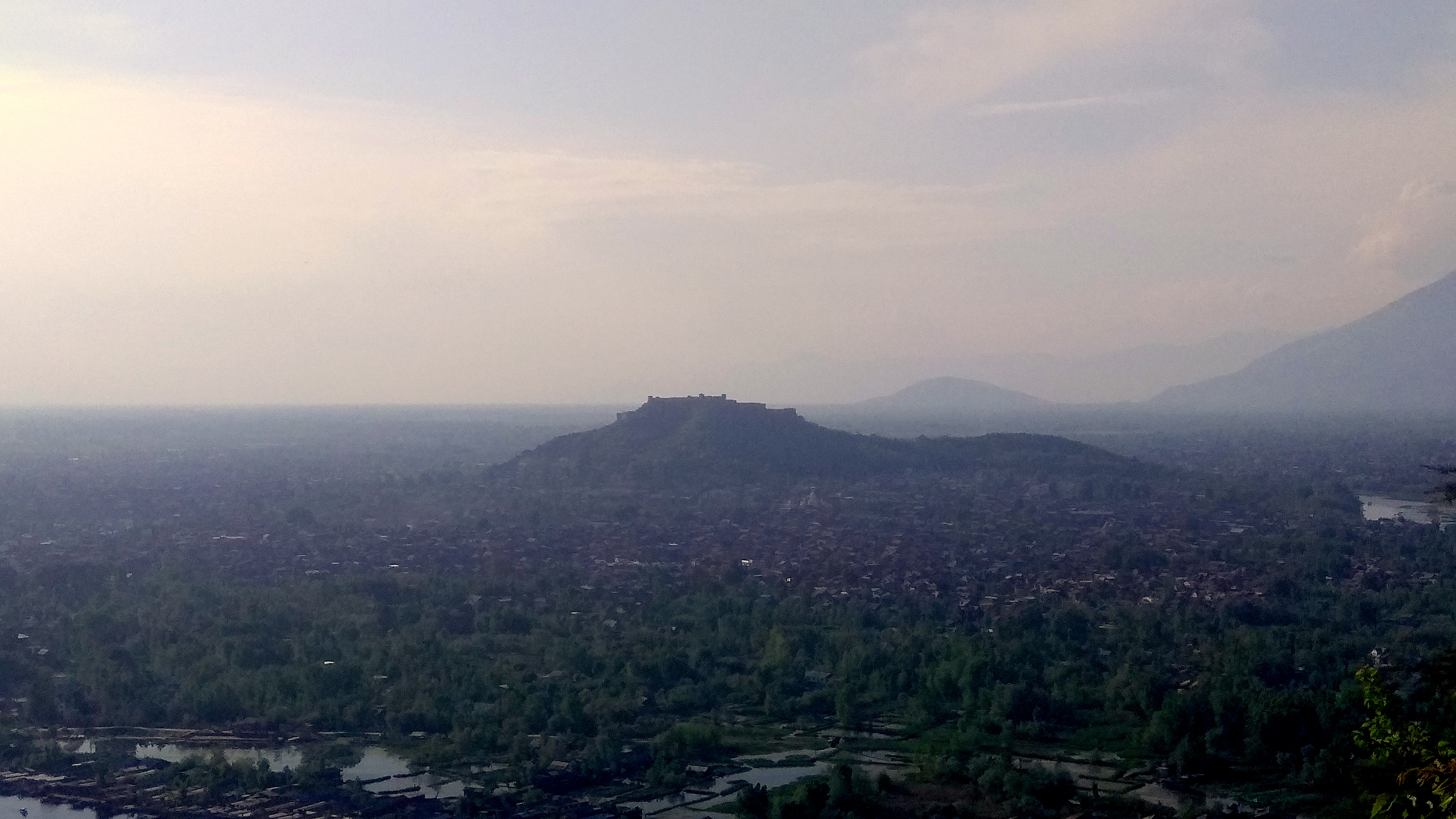
- View of Hari Parbat

Highest point

Geography
- Location within Jammu and Kashmir Location within India
- Location: Srinagar, J&K, India
- Parent range: Zabarwan

Hari Parbat (Kashmiri pronunciation: [haːri parbatʰ]), also called Koh-i-Maran (Kashmiri pronunciation: [koːhi maːraːn]), is a hill overlooking Srinagar, the largest city and the capital of Jammu and Kashmir, India. It is the site of the Hari Parbat fort, built by the Durrani Empire, and of a Hindu temple, mosques, and gurdwara.

== Hari Parbat Fort ==
The first fortifications on the site were constructed by the Mughal emperor Akbar in 1590 who built an outer wall for the fort as part of his plans for a new capital at the site of modern-day Srinagar city in Kashmir. The project, however, was never completed. The present fort was built in 1808 under the reign of the Governor of Kashmir Province of the Durrani Empire, Atta Mohammed Khan.

The fort can be reached via two sides of the city, (a) via Rainawari through Kathi Darwaza Gate and (b) via Hawal through the Sangin Darwaza Gate. The fort was closed for almost 2 decades and thrown open to the public in 2007.

The Indian government on 15 August 2021 (the 75th independence day) hoisted a 100-foot-tall Indian flag on the top of the fort.

== Shrines ==
=== Hindu temple ===
Hari Parbat is considered sacred by Kashmiri Pandits. According to Hindu Mythology, the area of Hari Parbat was inhabited by an asura named Jalodbhava. People went on to pray to goddess Parvati for help. She took the form of a bird and dropped a pebble on the asura's head. The pebble grew larger and larger until it crushed the asura. Hari Parbat is revered as that pebble, and Parvati is worshipped under the name Sharika, its temple occupying the middle part of the western slope of the hill. She is depicted as having 18 arms and sitting in Shri Chakra.

=== Muslim shrines ===
The southern side of Hari Parbat features Makhdoom Sahib, the shrine of Hamza Makhdoom, a 16th-century Kashmiri Sufi saint.

Built below the fort is Akhund Mullah Shah Mosque, dedicated to Shah Badakhshi, a 17th-century Qadiri Sufi saint. The mosque was built by Mughal princess Jahanara Begum.

At the foot of the hill lies Malkha Cemetery, one of the oldest and largest cemeteries in Srinagar.

=== Gurdwaras ===
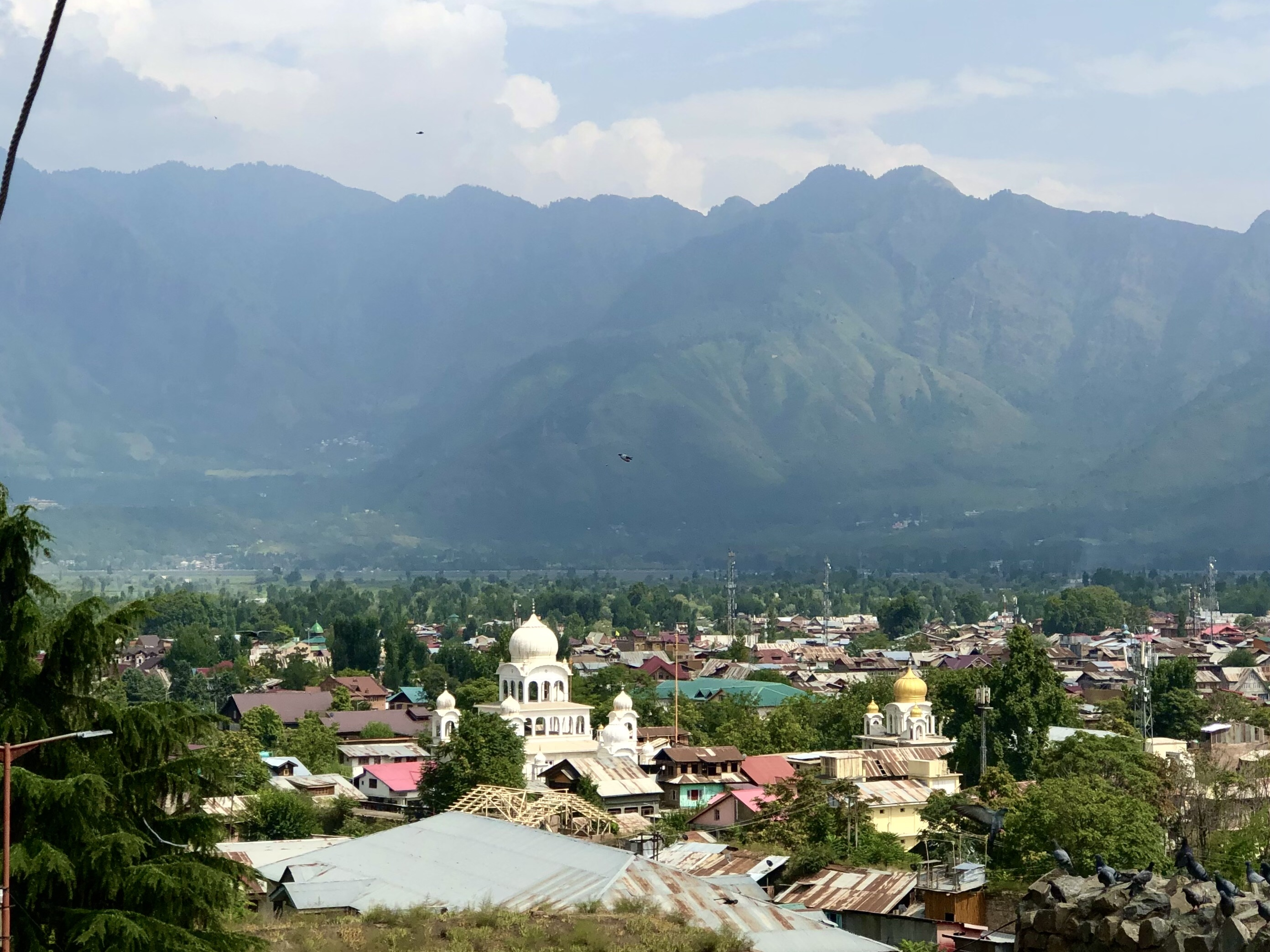
Gurdwara as seen from Hari Parbat

Gurdwara Chatti Patshahi at Kathi Darwaza, Rainawari, is believed to be the place where Guru Har Gobind, the sixth Sikh guru, stayed for few days while travelling through Kashmir.

Gurdwara Guru Nanak Dev is a place where Guru Nanak sat and had discourse with people in early sixteenth century. It was earmarked with a pedestal by Mohammad Ata Khan, a general of Akbar who built the Durrani Fort. A small Gurdwara was later built at the place by Guru Har Gobind.

== Gallery ==
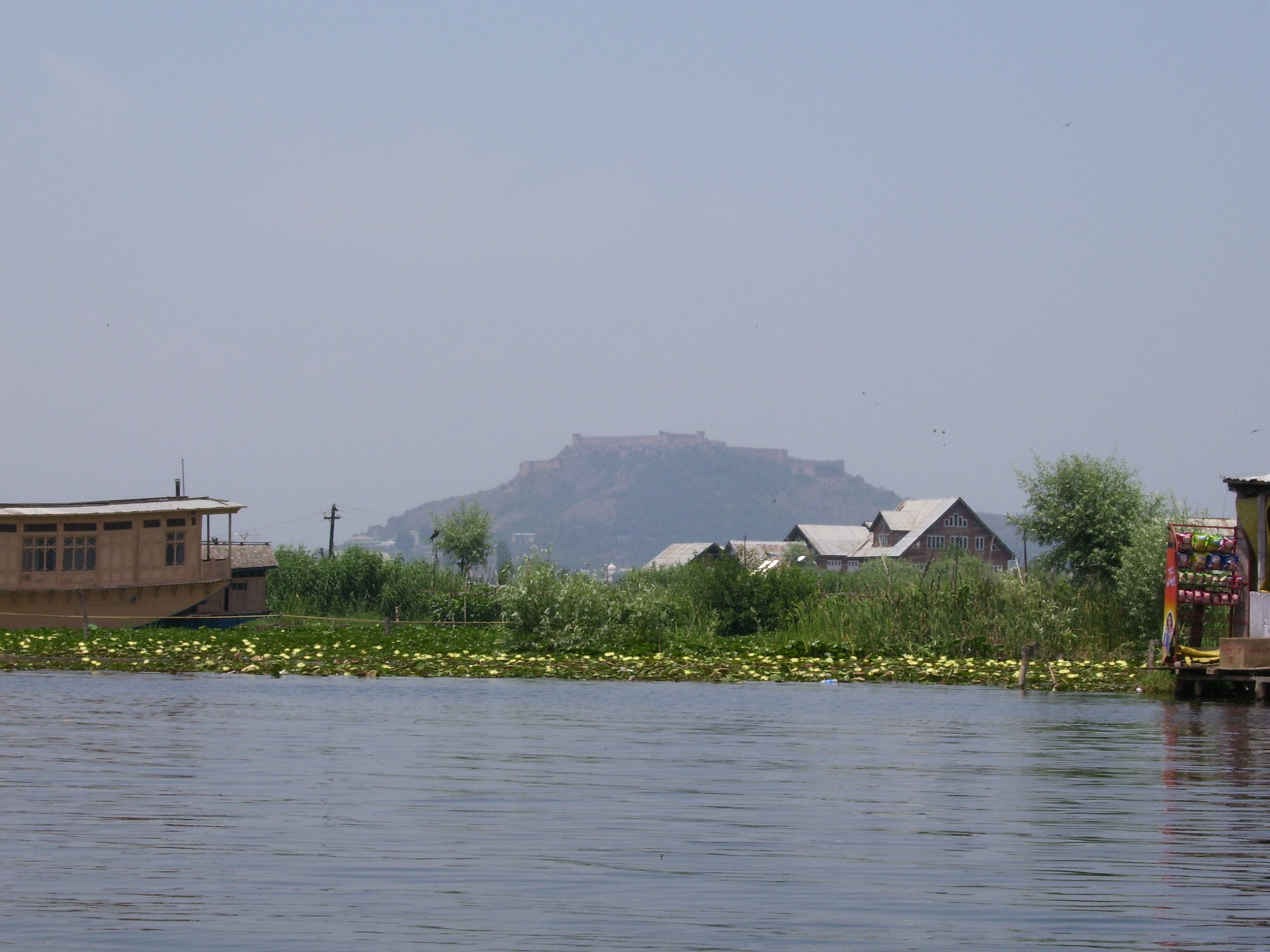
Hari Parbat from Dal Lake, Srinagar.

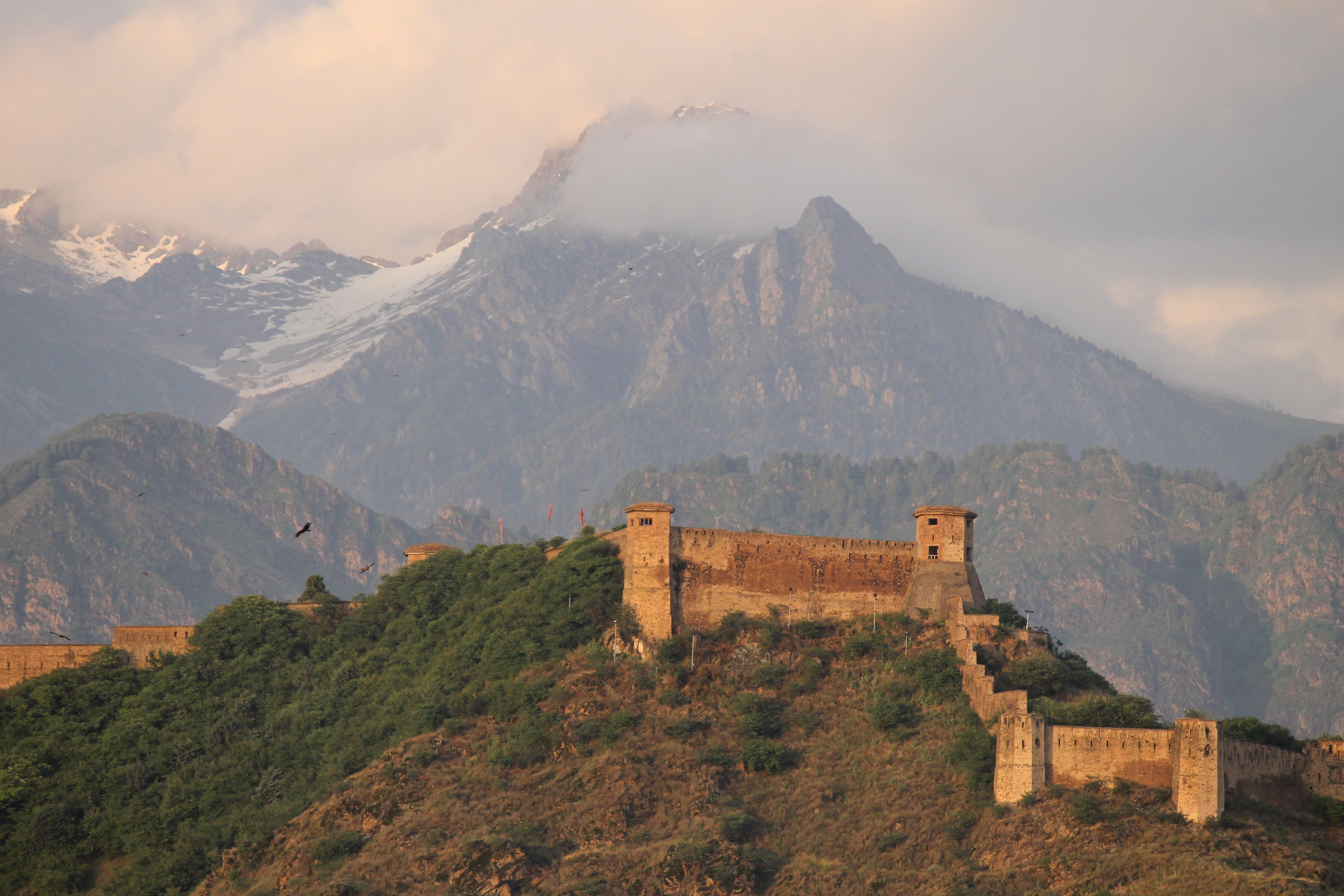
Hari Parbat as seen from downtown Srinagar, with Mount Mahadev in the background.

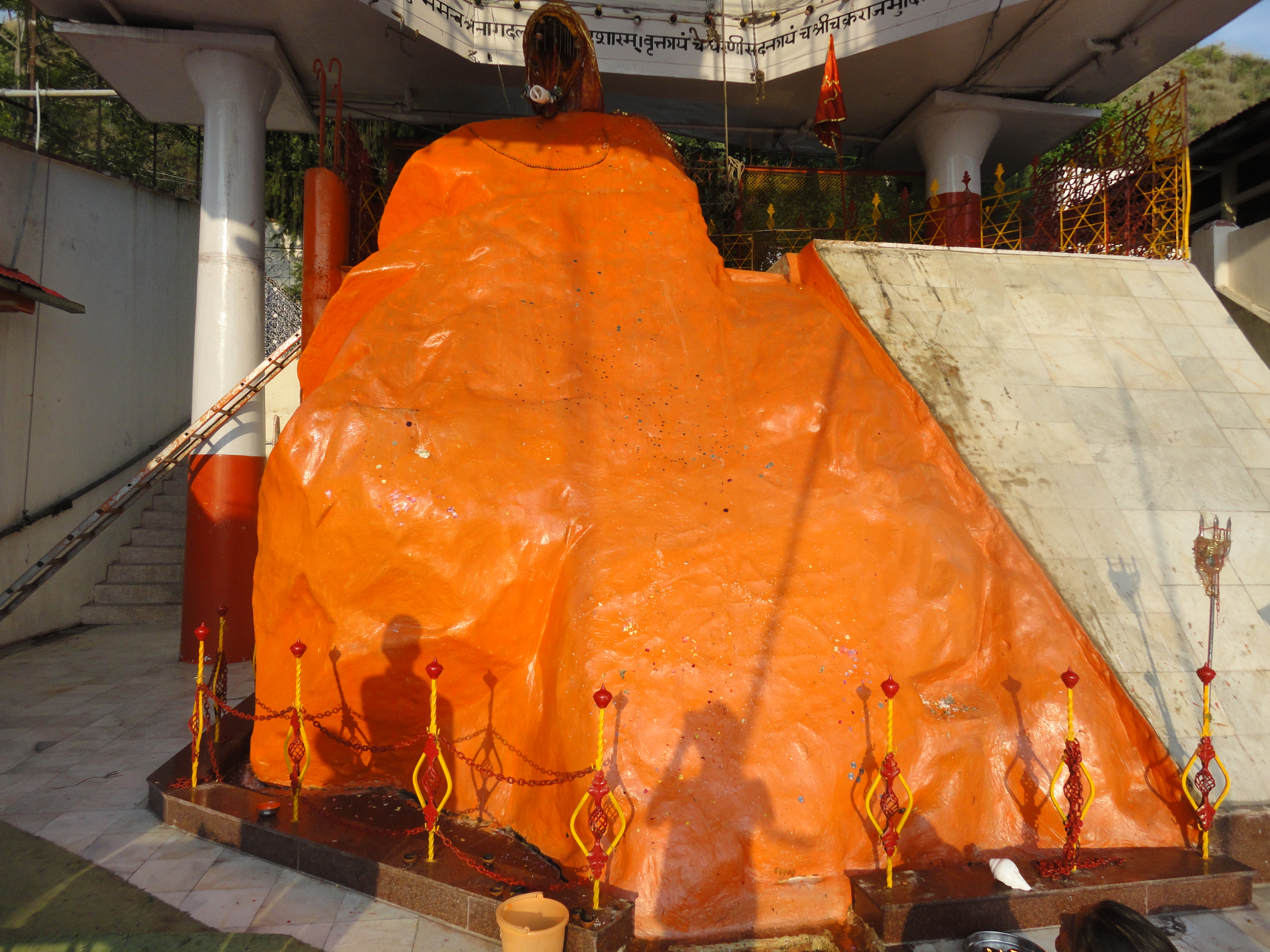
Sharika Temple

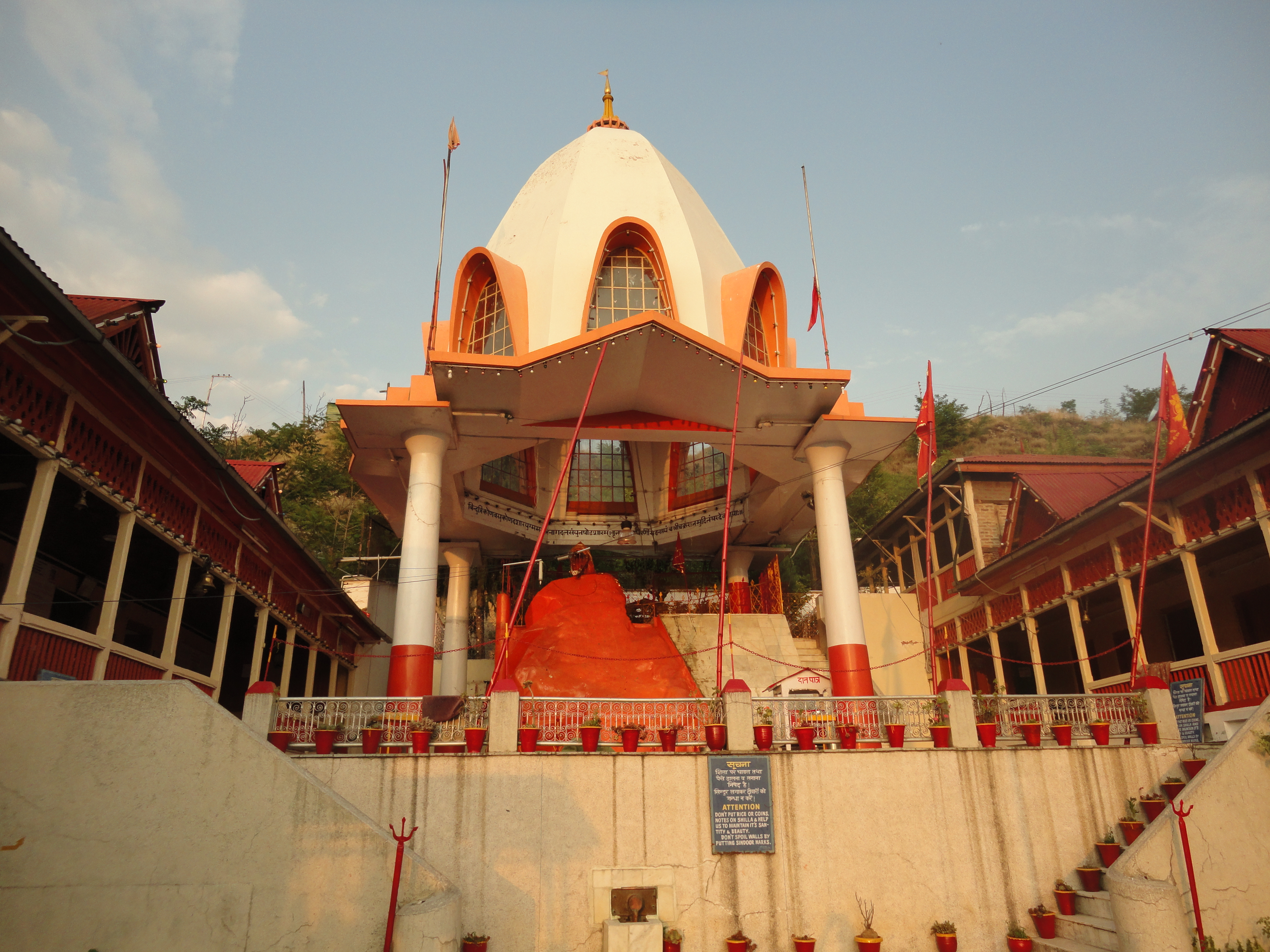
Sharika Temple

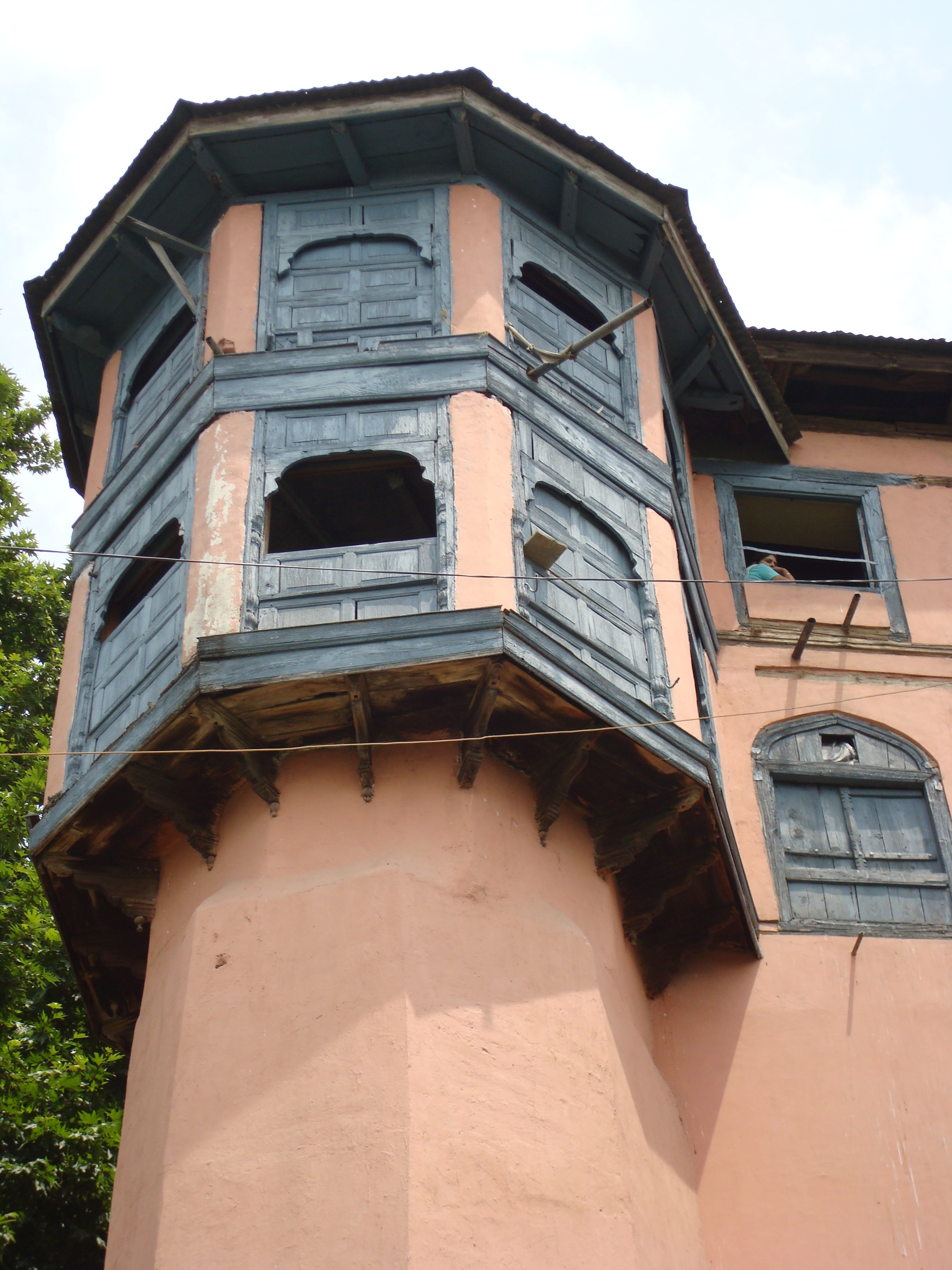
Wooden windows of Hari Parbat Temple

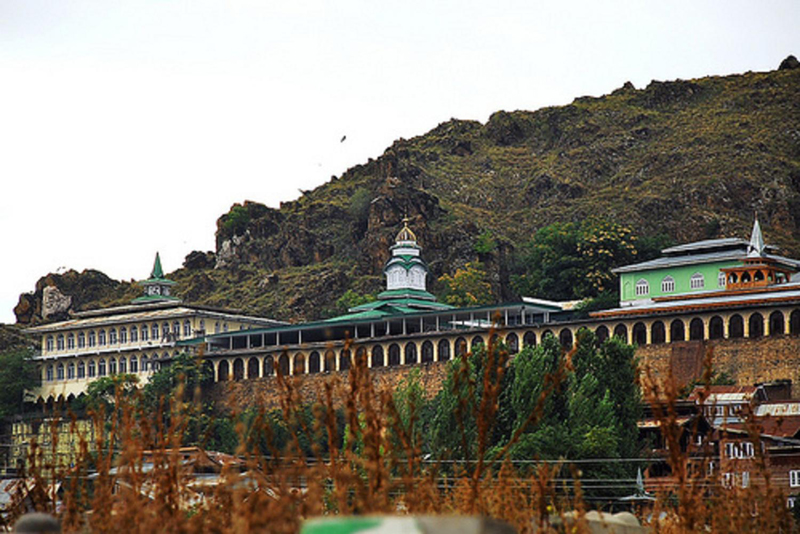
Shrine of Hamza Makhdoom, Srinagar.

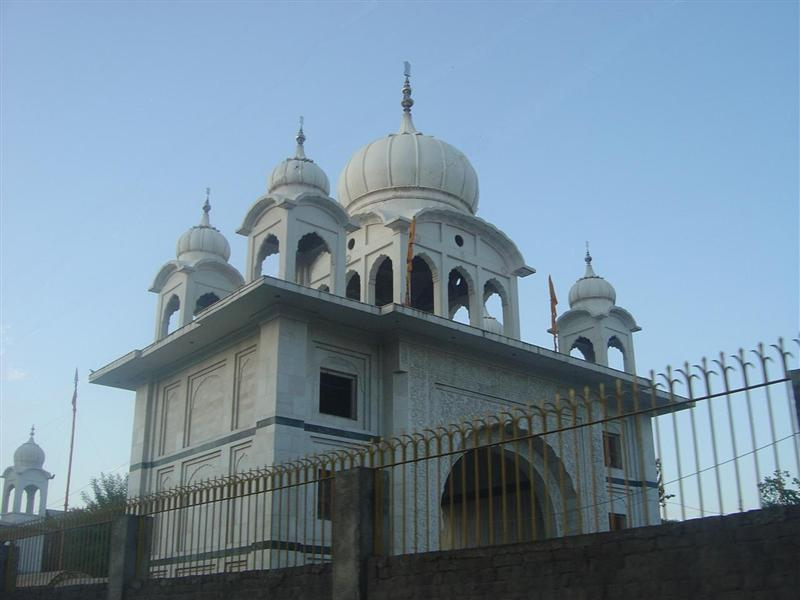
Gurdwara Chatti Patshahi, Rainawari

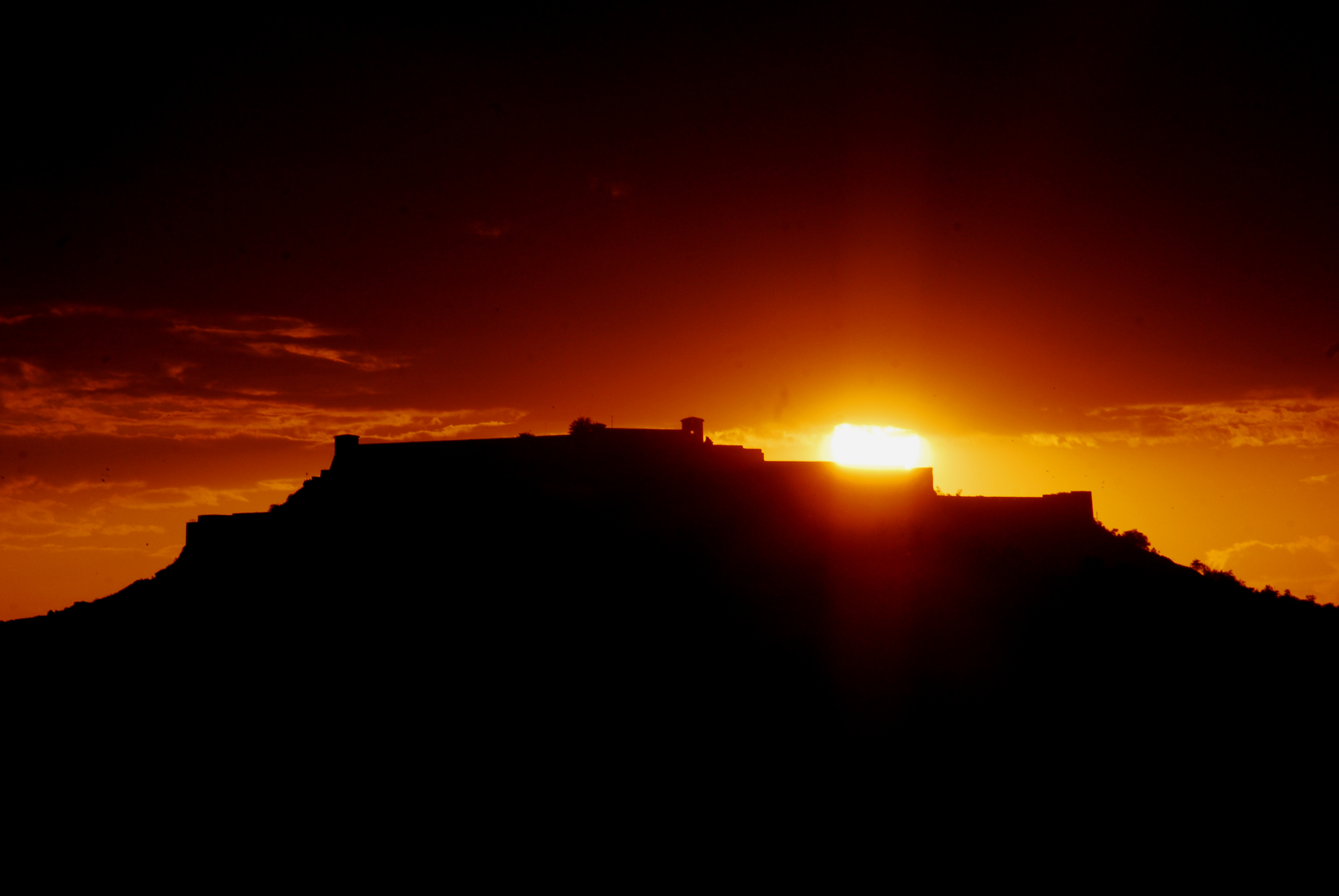
Hari Parvat

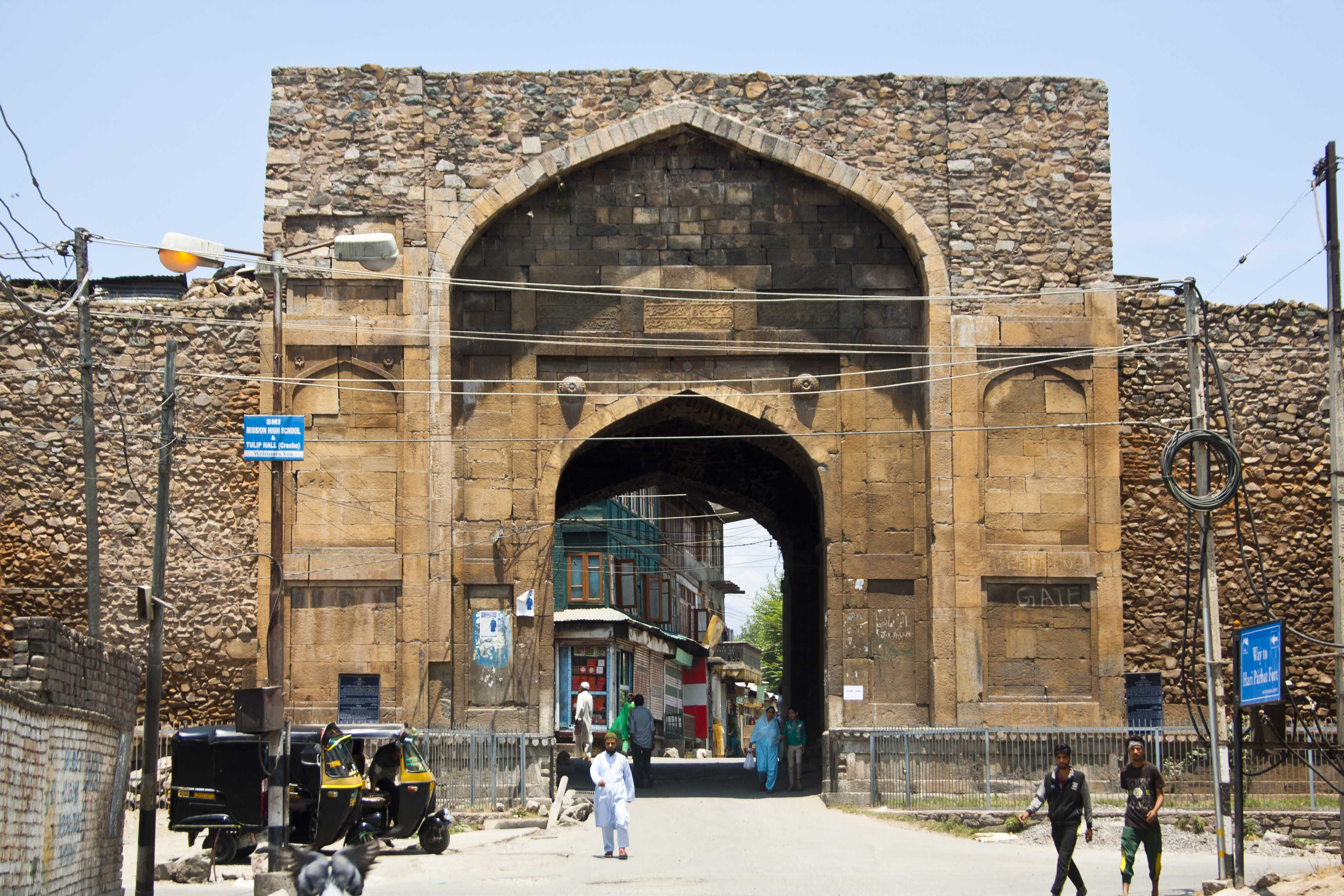
Kathi Darwaza

== See also ==
- Badamwari Park, situated at the foothills of Hari Parbat
