= Zuljanah =

Zuljhanah; A ride less horse during the morning of 10 muharram

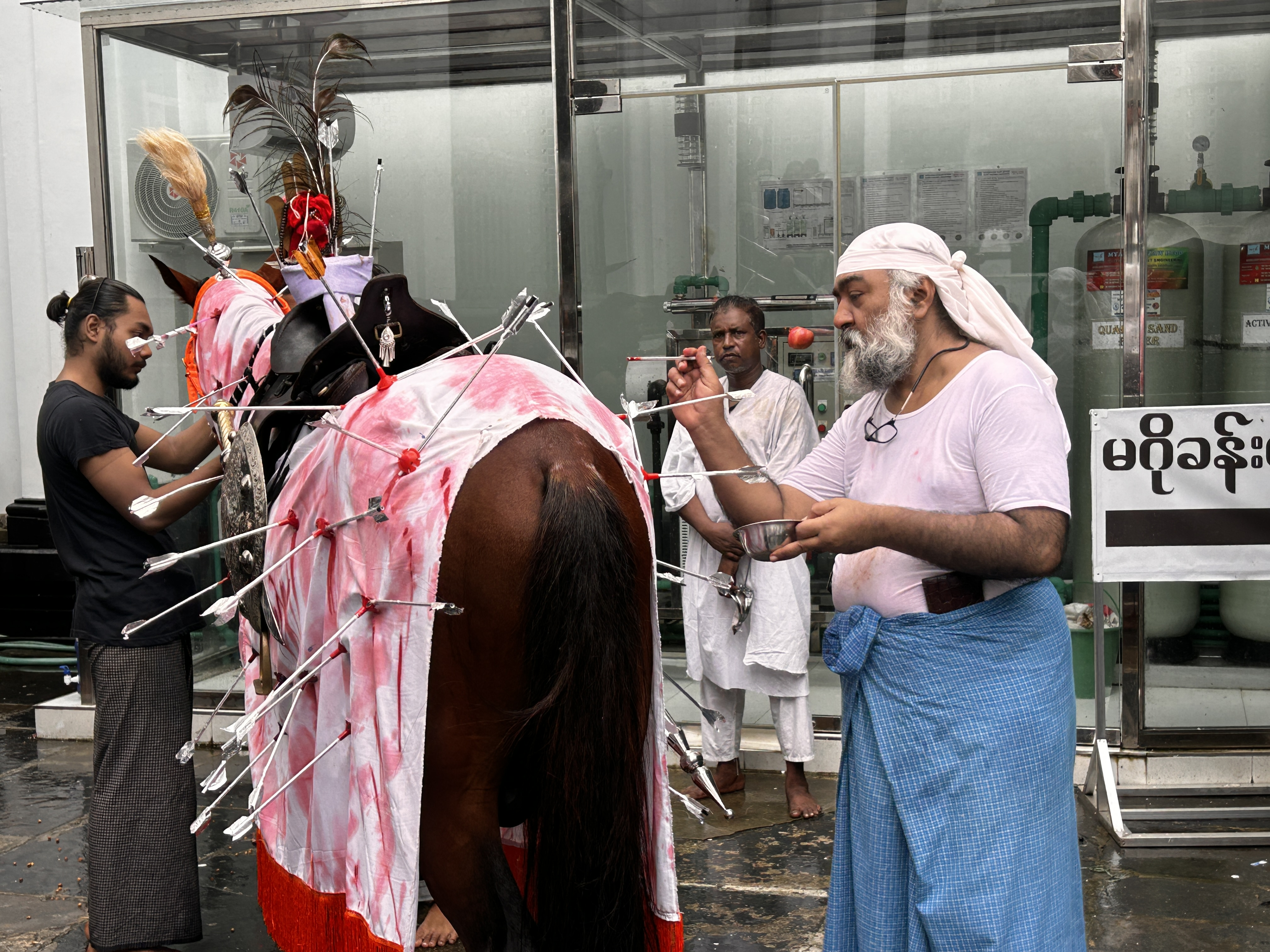
The Yangon Shia community decorating a Zuljanah horse for Ashura

Zuljanah (Arabic: ذو الجناح) was a grey Arabian Stallion that belonged to Husayn ibn Ali. He was bred and raised by Muhammad. Zuljanah was known to be very loyal and was famous for his strength, endurance and devotion. It is said that he shielded Husayn ibn Ali with his body and was injured taking an arrow meant for his master during the Battle of Karbala. When Husayn ibn Ali succumbed to his injuries, Zuljanah returned bloodied to his family, alerting them to the ambush and died after discharging his final duty. During the Muharram procession, a decorated riderless horse representing the historic sacrifice is honoured by the devotees.

== See also ==
- List of historical horses
