= Dastgeer Sahib =

Muslim shrine in Srinagar, Jammu and Kashmir, India

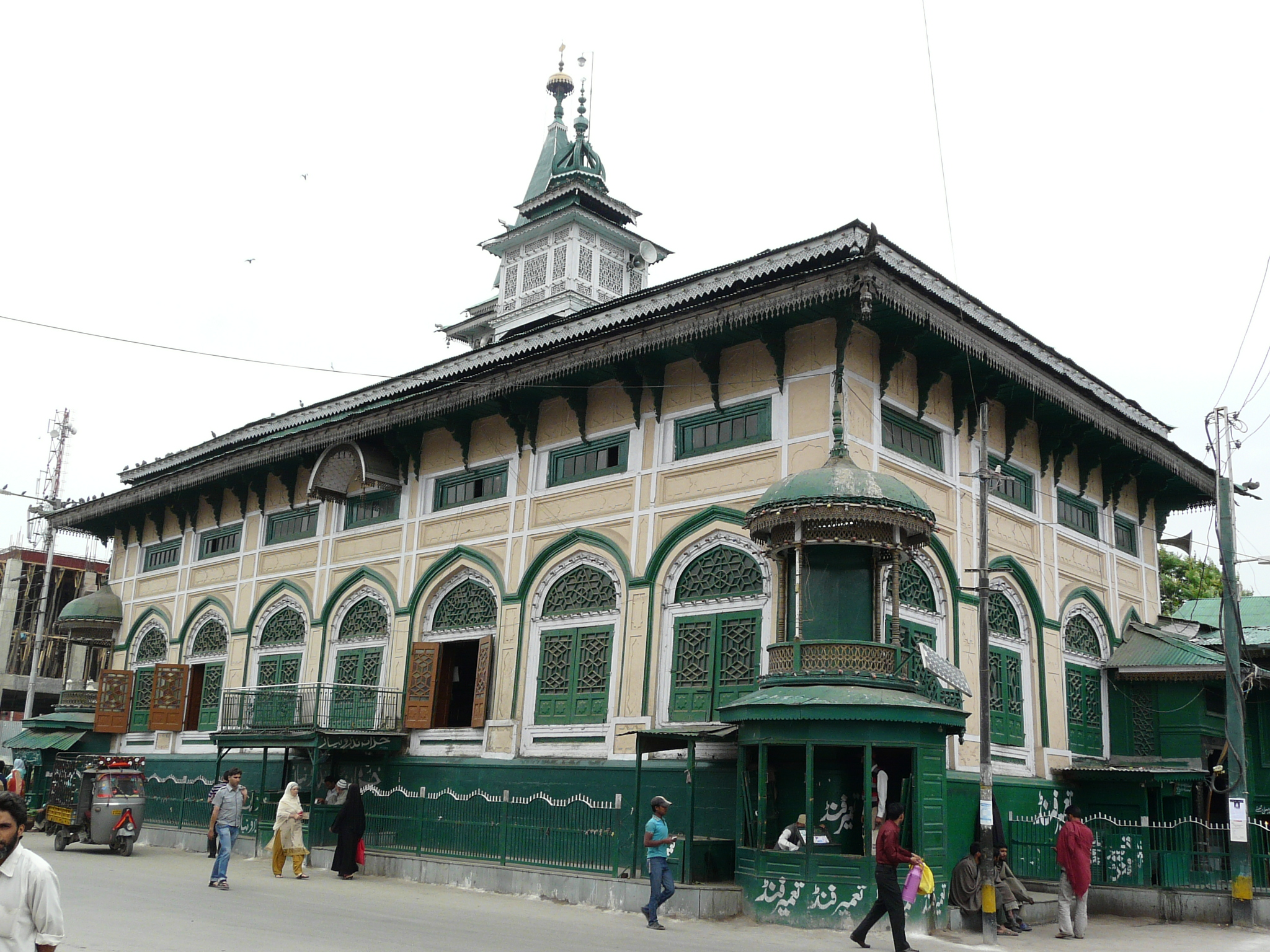
- The shrine and mosque in 2011

- Location of the shrine in Jammu and Kashmir

Religion
- Affiliation: Sunni Islam
- Rite: Sufism
- Ecclesiastical or organizational status: Sufi shrine; Mosque
- Status: Active

Location
- Location: Khanyar, Srinagar, Jammu and Kashmir
- Country: India
- Interactive map of Dastgeer Sahib
- Administration: Central Waqf Council
- Coordinates: 34°5′34.7″N 74°49′3″E

Architecture
- Style: Khatamband
- Completed: c. 1767

Specifications
- Interior area: 740 m^{2} (8,000 sq ft)
- Spire: Two

The Dastgeer Sahib is a Sufi shrine and mosque located in the Khanyar area of Srinagar, in the union territory of Jammu and Kashmir, India. The shrine houses the relics of Abdul Qadir Jeelani (1077-1166), a Sufi saint of Mohammed's progeny who earned deep reverence across the subcontinent, despite never having set foot in the region.

The shrine has played a significant role in the socio-political landscape of Kashmir. One notable incident occurred on 8 May 1991, when paramilitary forces opened fire on civilians at the shrine, resulting in 18 deaths and 44 injuries. The shrine has been administered by the Central Waqf Council since 2003.

== Architecture ==
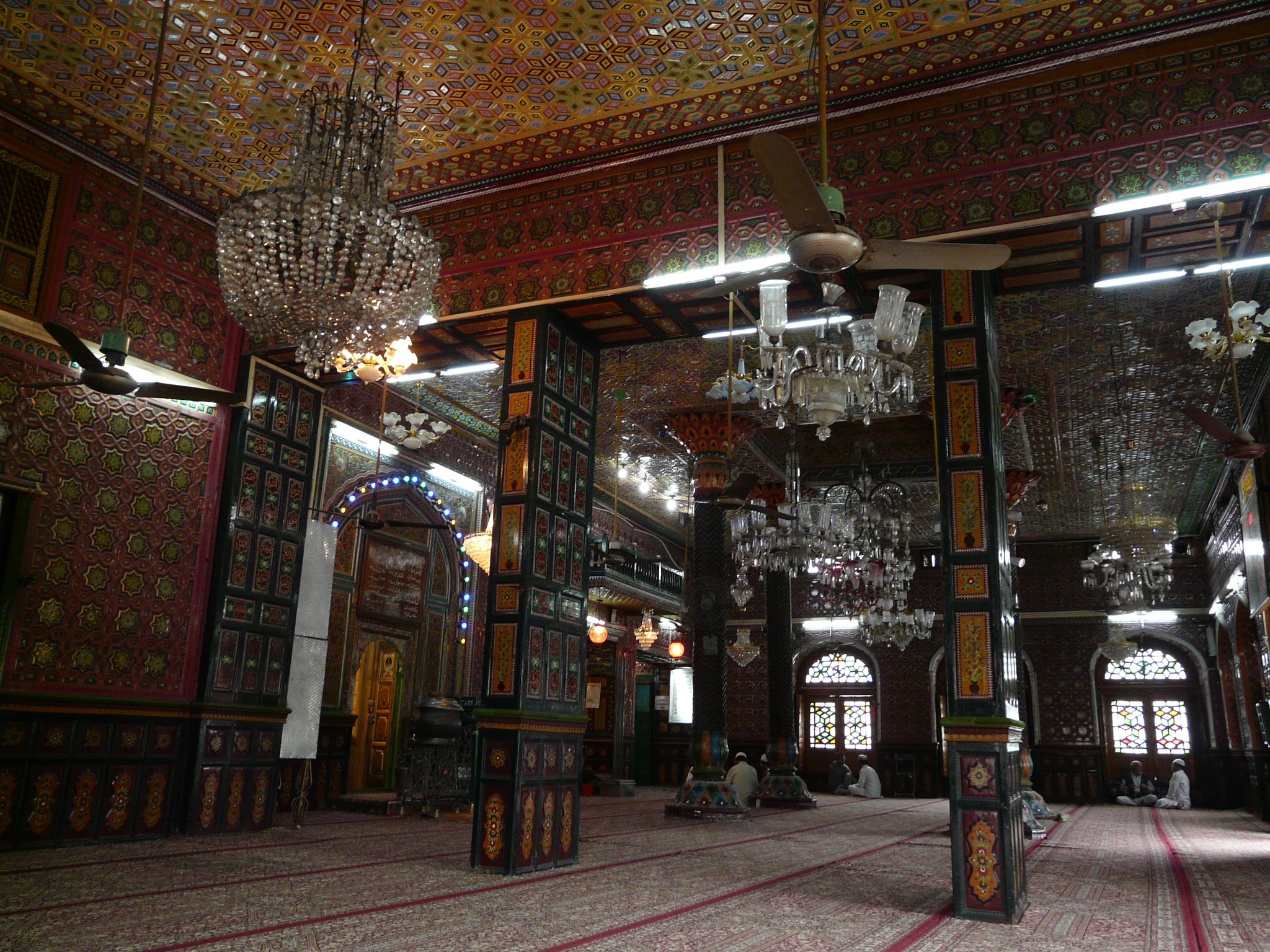
Dastgeer Sahib interior

The shrine is notable for its impressive interior spaces, which accommodate worshippers. The ceiling is crafted in the traditional 'khatamband' style and features numerous crystal chandeliers. The walls are adorned with elaborate Papier-mâché work, making the shrine's decorative elements distinctive in modern architecture. The shrine spans an area of approximately 740 square metres (8,000 sq ft), although modifications over the years have affected its original layout.

== History ==
The Dastgeer Sahib is a 200-year-old shrine situated in Khanyar. It is associated with Abdul Qadir Gilani, whose hair strand, a relic locally known as Mouia Pāk, is believed to be housed here which was reportedly brought to Kashmir by a merchant from Kandahar in 1806. It also contains an old Quran believed to be written by Ali Ibn Abi Talib in 6th-century Kufi script. The shrine was reportedly constructed between 1845 and 1854 under the patronage of Mir Husain Qadri, a philanthropist who contributed significantly to religious structures in the region.

The Kashmir Encyclopedia, published by the state's cultural academy, suggests that the structure was initially established during the governance of Noor Khan Bamzai in 1767 by Syed Ghulam-ud-Din Azad, a descendant of Shah Sakhi Muhammad Fazil, who introduced the Qadri order to Kashmir. The shrine underwent repairs and expansions in 1879 after a fire caused significant damage, during which the spire's pointed ball was plated with gold.

It is the centre of the activity hub of the Khanyar and is surrounded by a large market. On the Urs or birth date of the Abdul Qadir Gilani, thousands of people from all over Kashmir go there to pray to Allah and watch the ziyarat. There are five graves situated inside it. It is said that it is of one of the students of the Qadiri silsila of Sheikh Syed Abdul Qadir Jelani.

=== Fire ===
The shrine was badly damaged in a fire on 25 June 2012. The relics of the saint that were located inside a fireproof vault were not damaged. The shrine was restored to its original state.

== See also ==
- Islam in India
- List of mosques in India
