= Badamwari Park =

Park in Srinagar, Jammu and Kashmir, India

- Badamvear
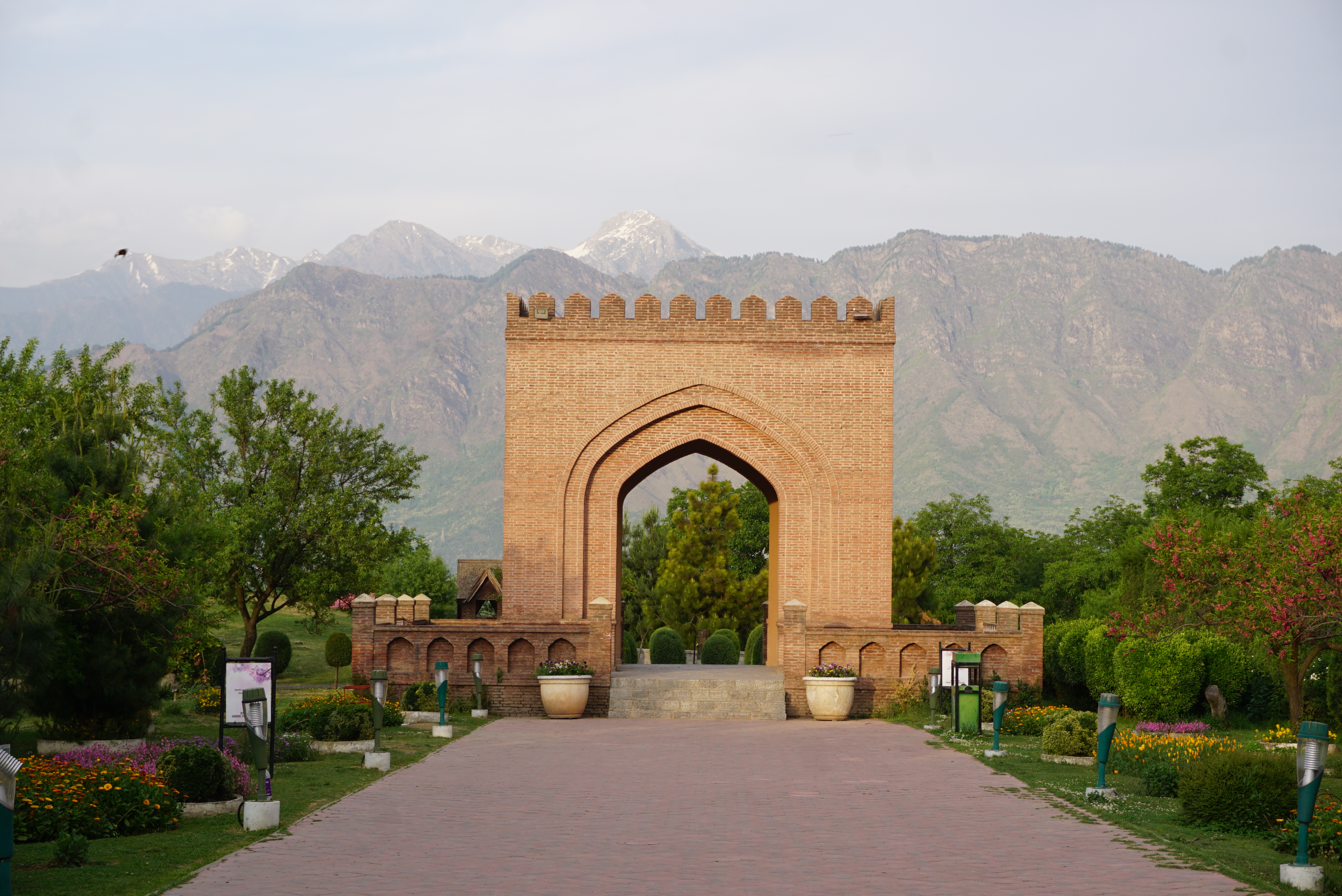
- An arched gateway inside the Badamwari Park with the snow-capped Mount Mahadev in the background
- Interactive map of Badamwari Park
- Type: Municipal park and garden
- Location: Srinagar, Kashmir
- Coordinates: 34°06′41″N 74°49′18″E

Badamwari Park or Badamvaer is a park in Srinagar, Jammu and Kashmir, India. It is known for the early bloom of almond flowers. The park is situated at the foothills of Koh e Maraan hill which gives an immense look. It is a historical park which existed before the 14th century, though the exact date is still unknown. A well covered dome in the garden is named after an Afghan ruler, Warris Shah.

The park is in full bloom during the spring season. The garden is spread over more than 300 kanals of land. The park was revived by the Jammu & Kashmir Bank in 2008; prior to this the park was left abandoned and nomads used to live there during summer.

During the opening ceremony, several cultural activities including traditional Kashmiri folk songs and group dance are performed by local artists every year.
