= List of Hindu temples in Kashmir =

This is a list of Hindu Temples in Kashmir.

== Anantnag District ==
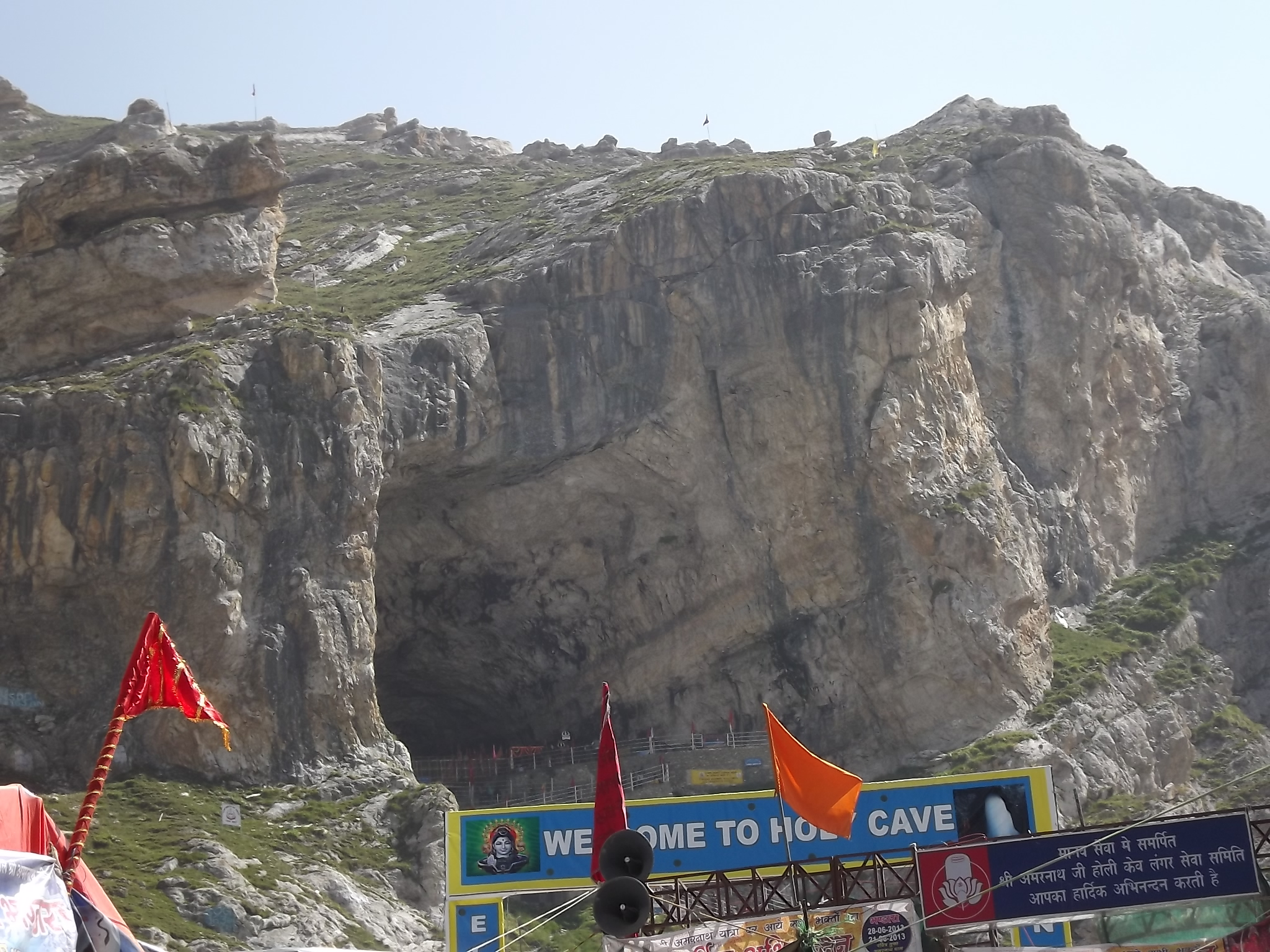
Amarnath

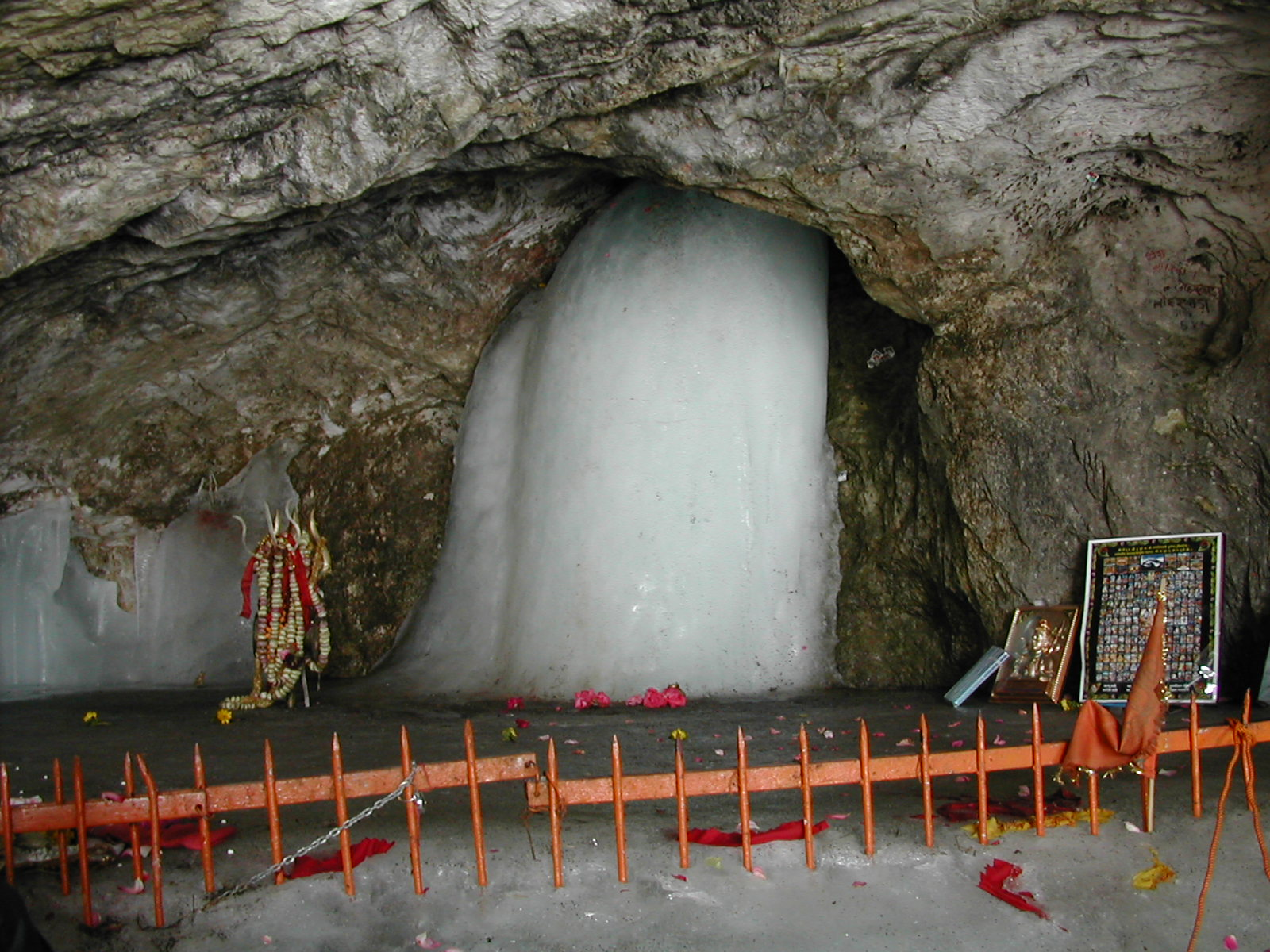
Shivling, Amarnath

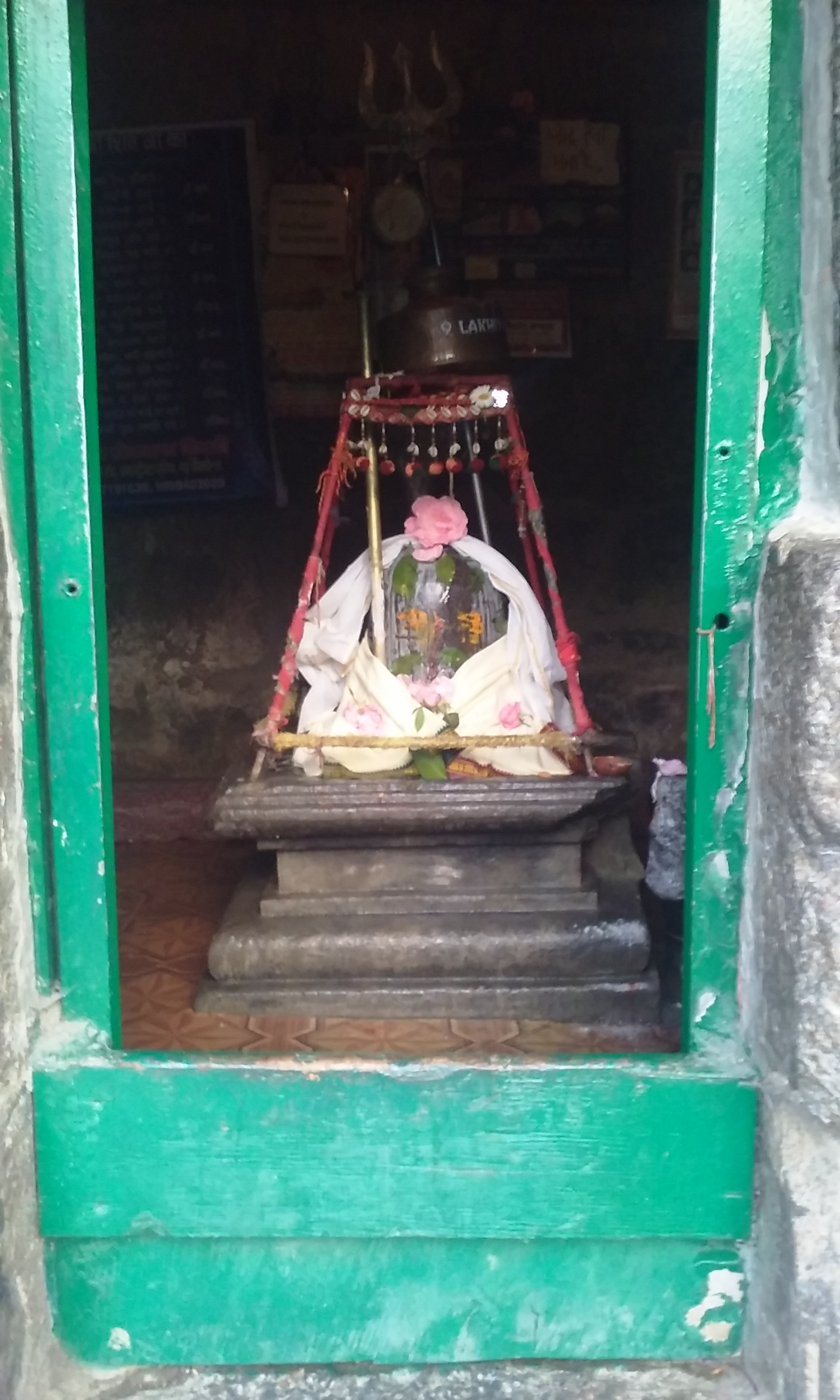
Mamal Temple

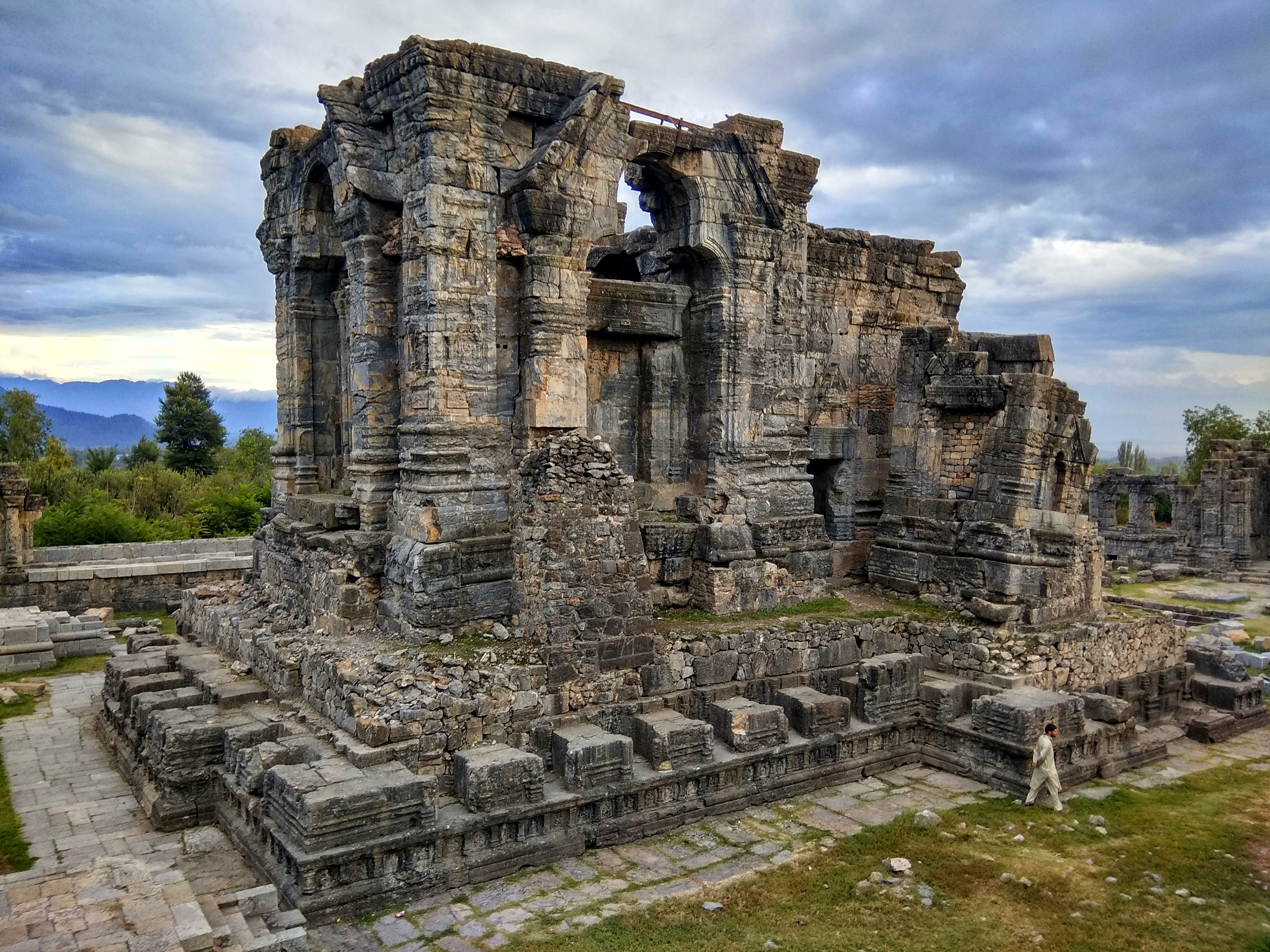
Martand Sun Temple

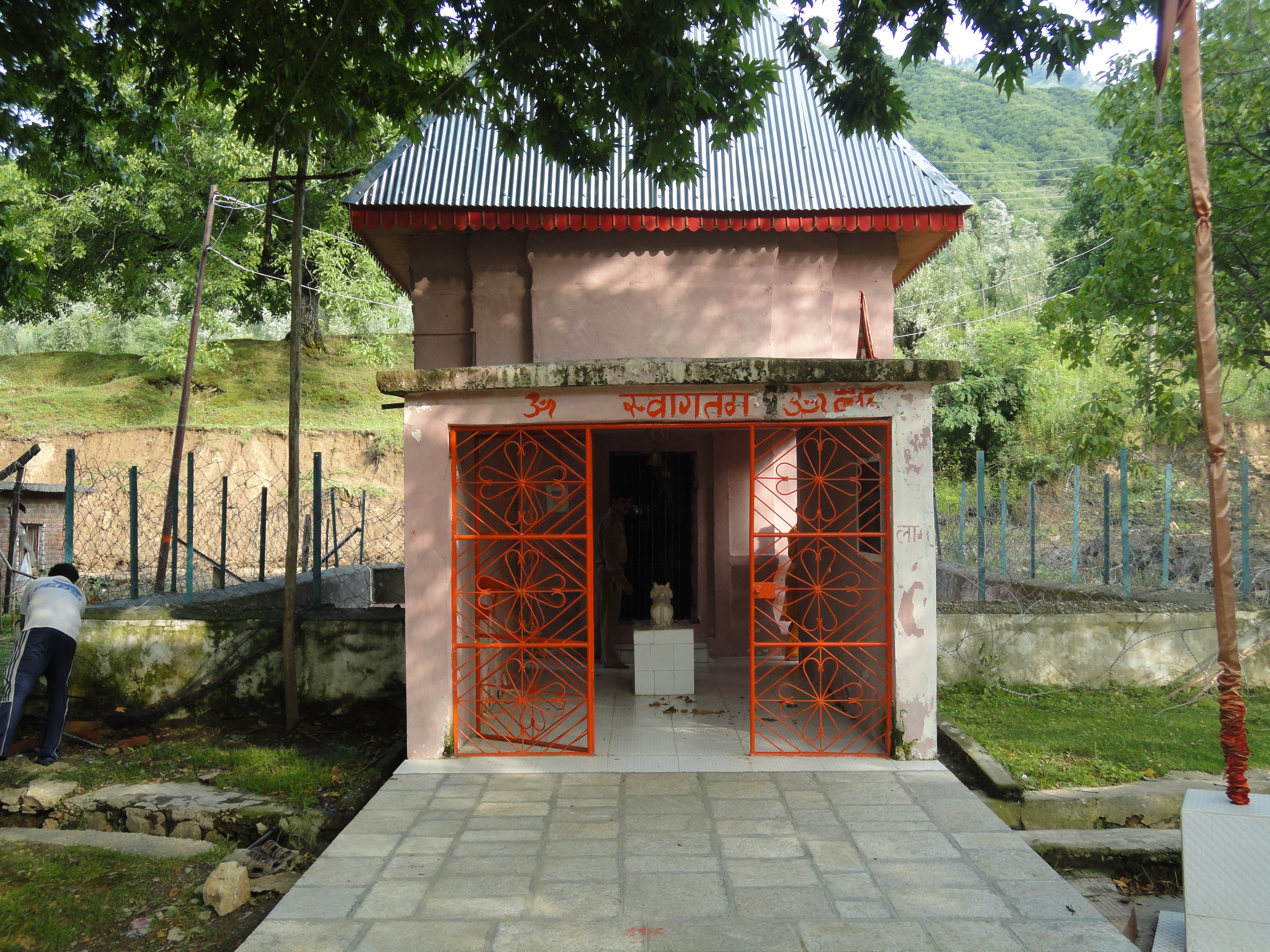
Verinag Temple
- Amarnath Temple
- Mamal Temple at Pahalgam
- Shiva Bhagwati Temple Akingam
- Martand Sun Temple
- Bumzuva Cave and Temple
- Verinag Temple

== Baramulla District ==
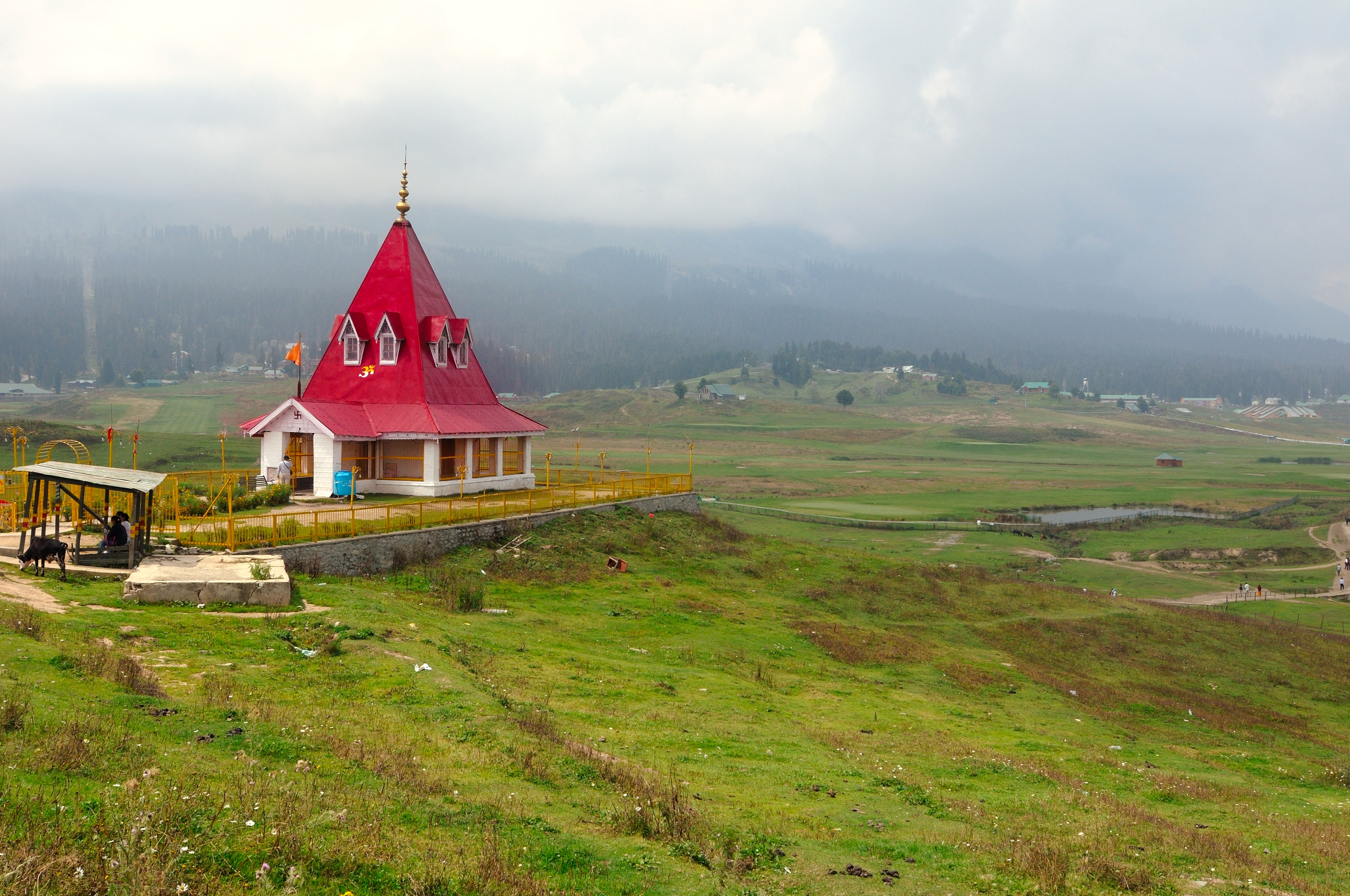
Gulmarg Maharani Temple

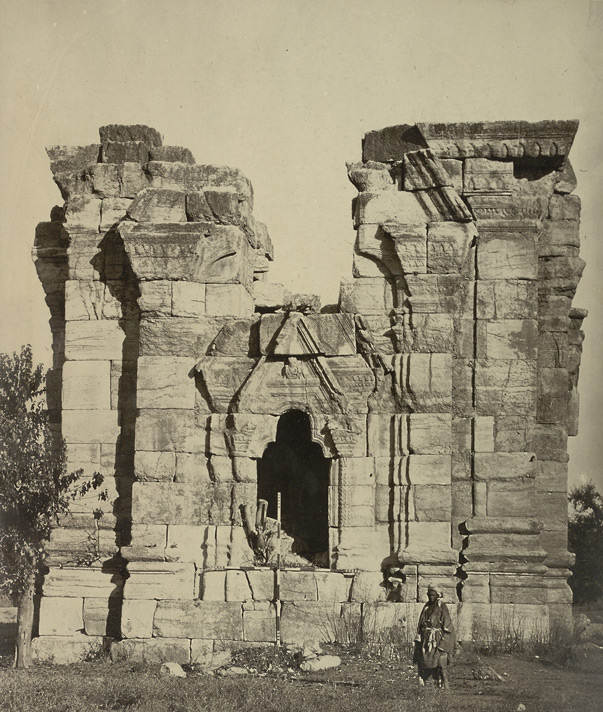
Shankaragaurishvara Temple
- Gulmarg Maharani temple
- Shankaragaurishvara Temple at Pattan

== Ganderbal District ==
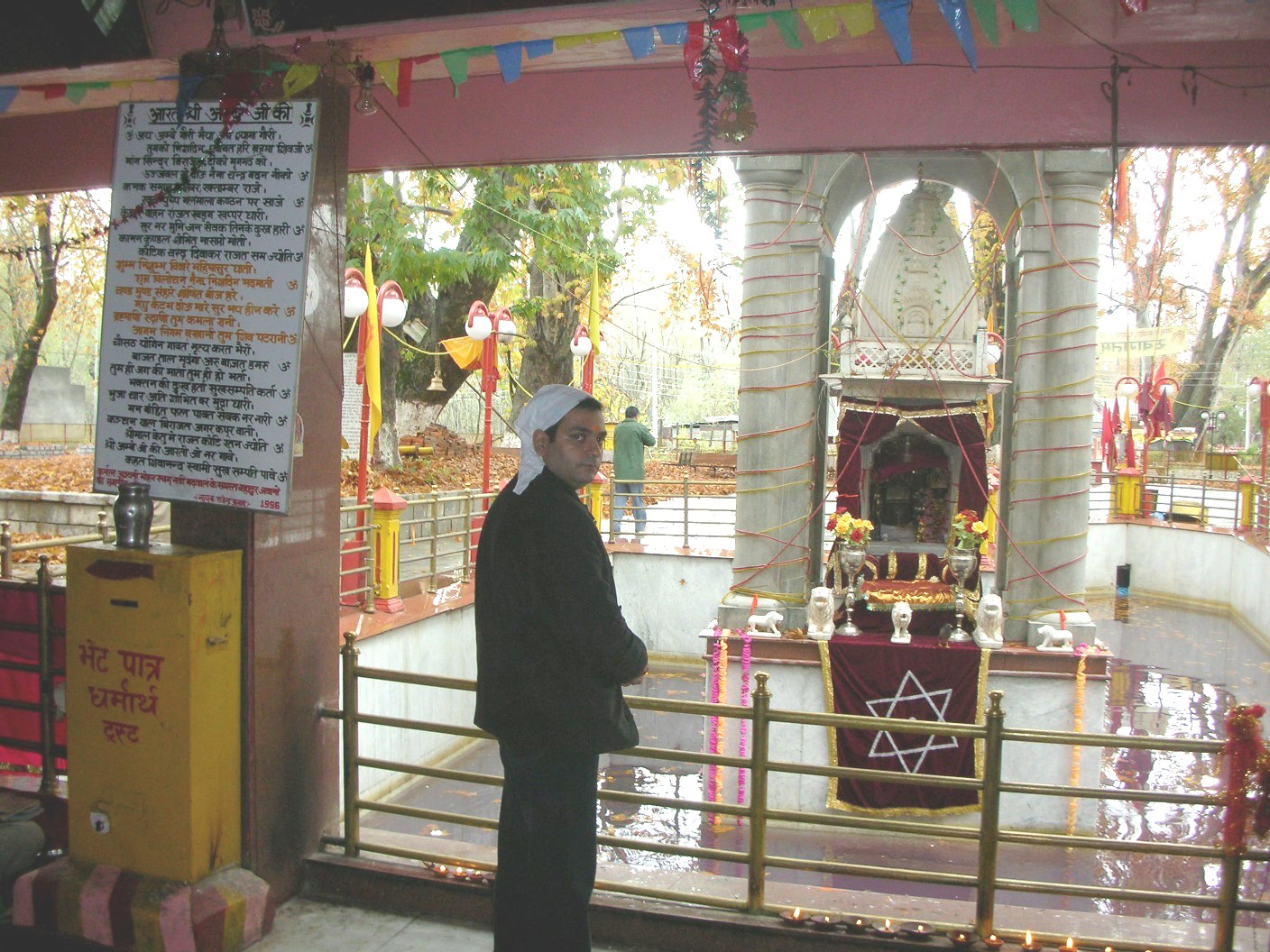
Kheer Bhawani

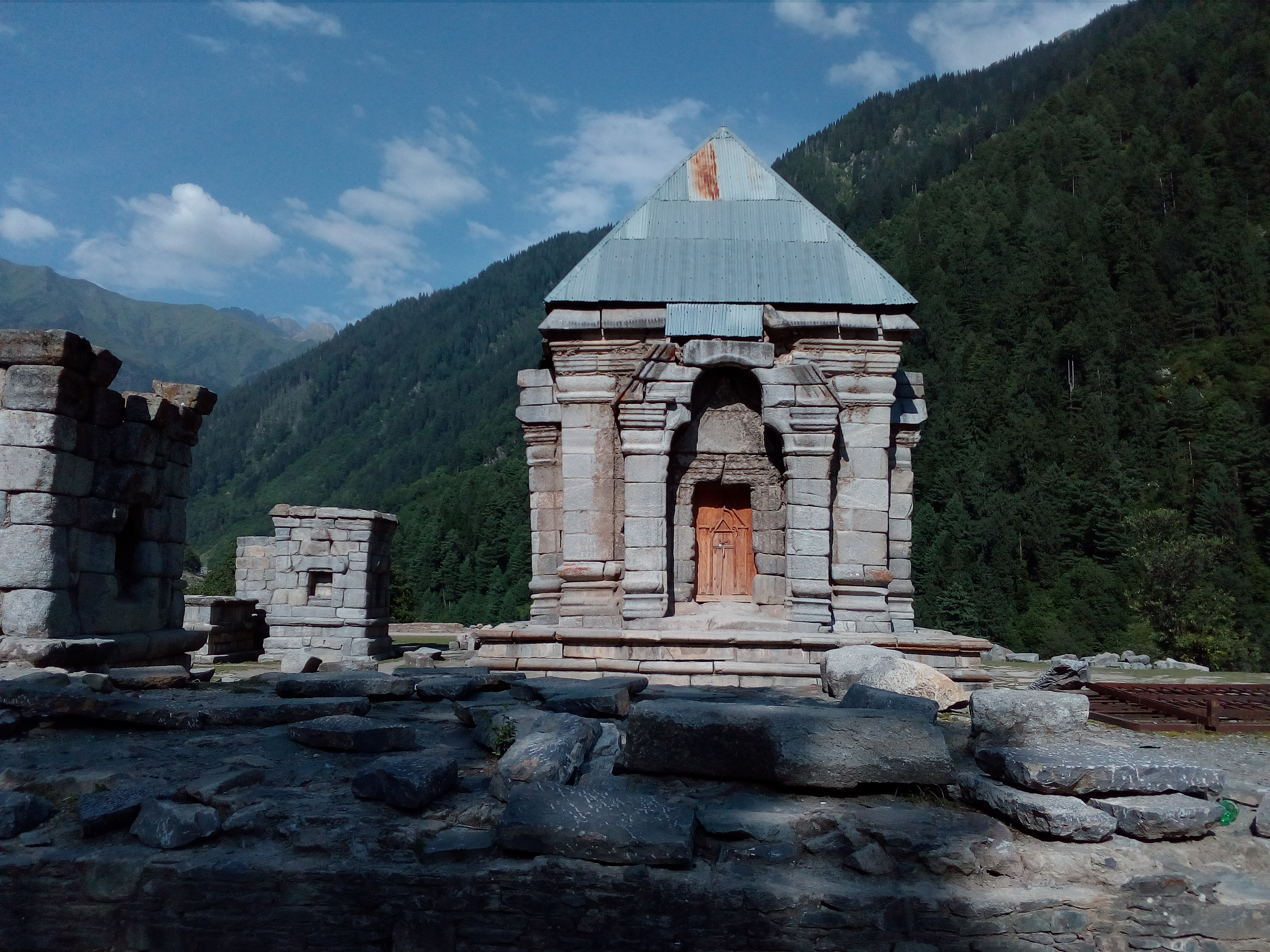
Wangath Temple complex

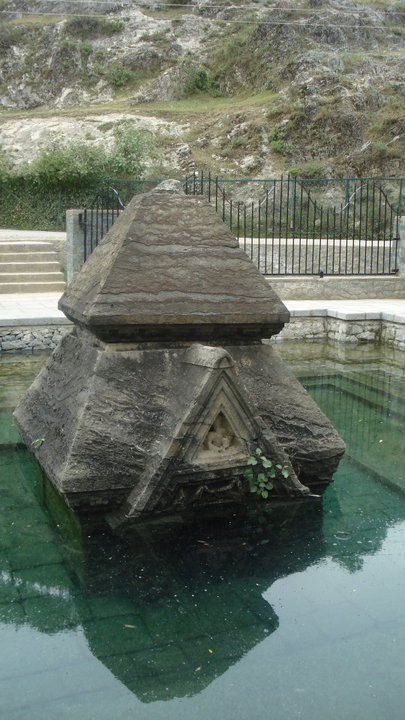
Manasbal Temple
- Kheer Bhawani at Tulmul
- Manasbal lake
- Wangath Temple complex
- Harmukh

== Kulgam District ==
- Kausar Nag

== Kupwara District ==
- Bhadrakali Temple in Handwara

== Pulwama District ==
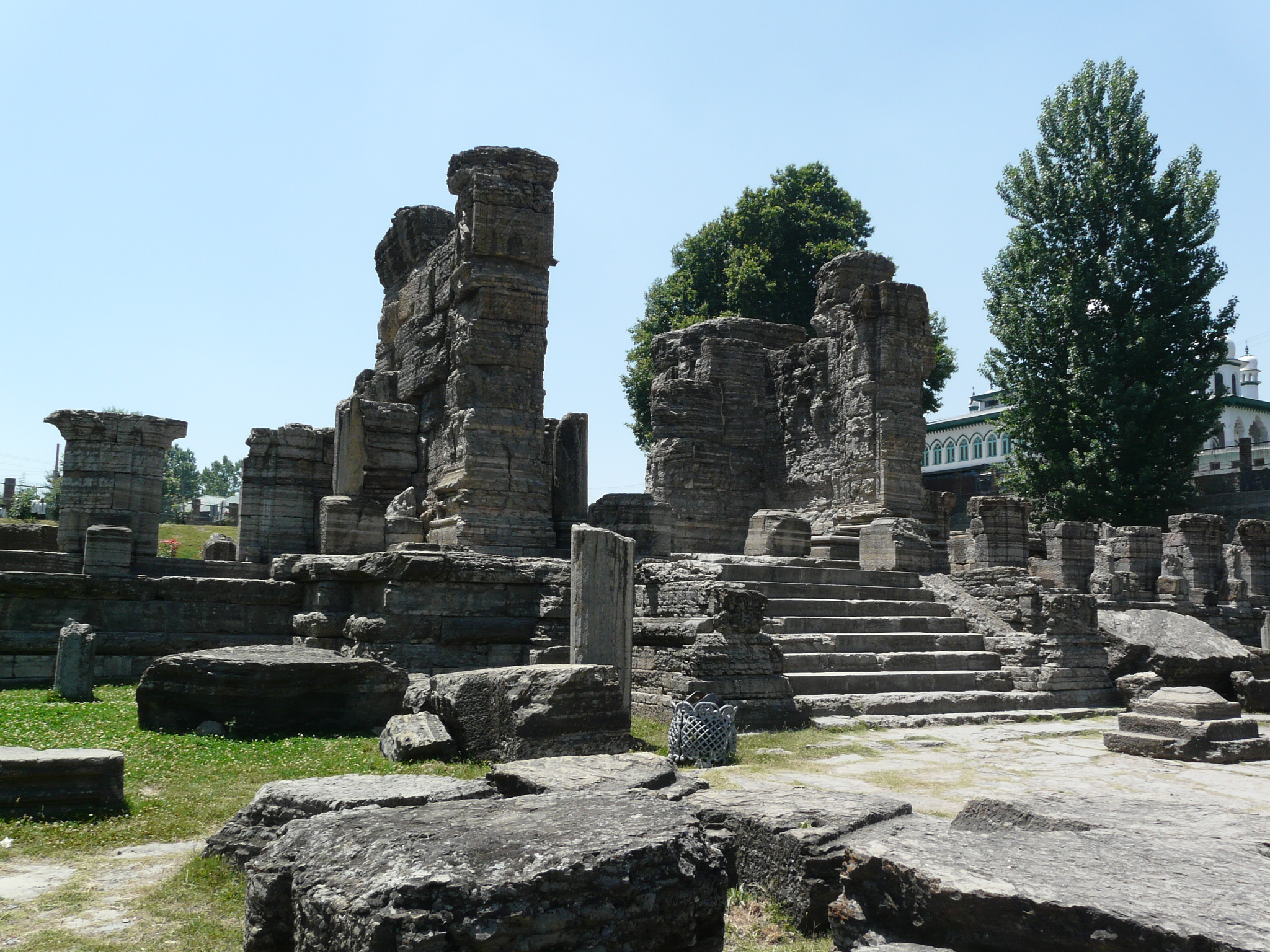
Avantiswami Temple

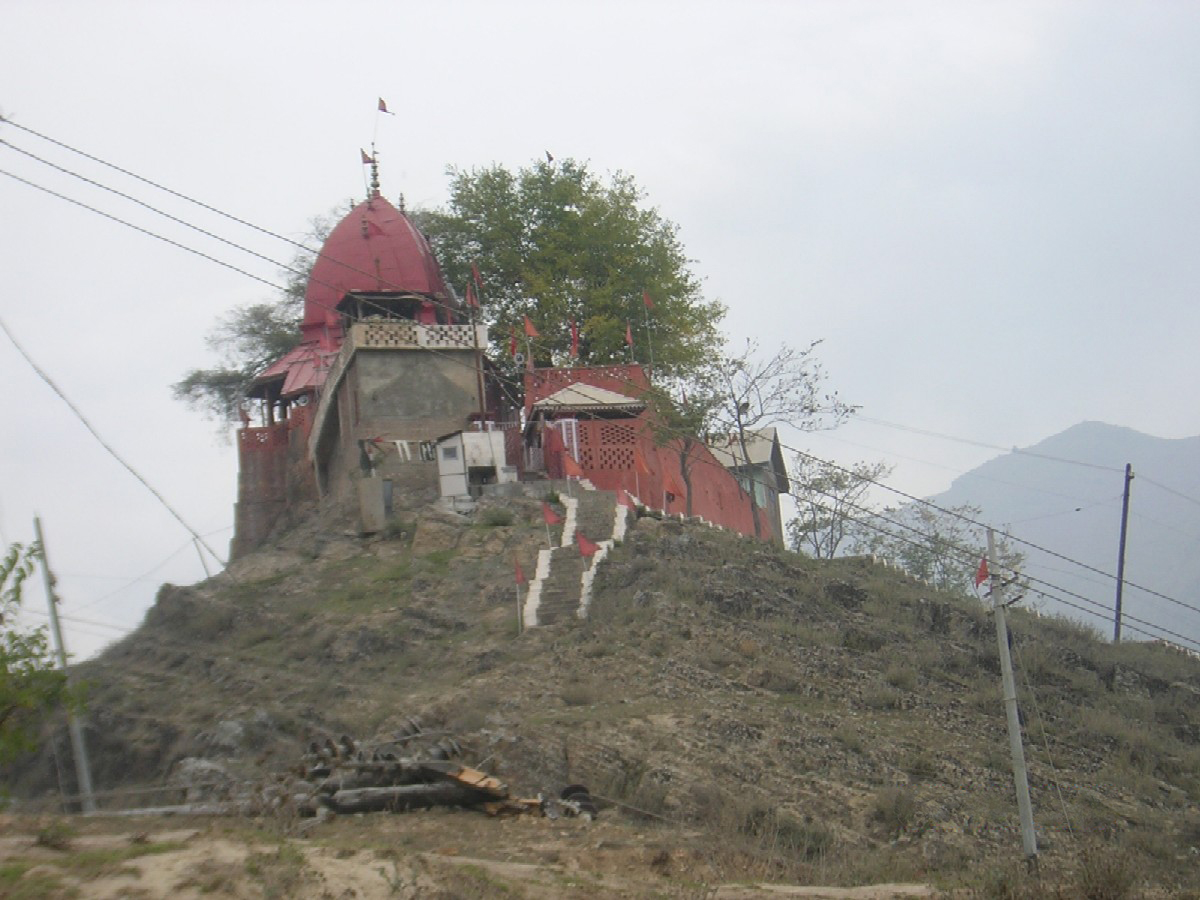
Jwala Ji Temple

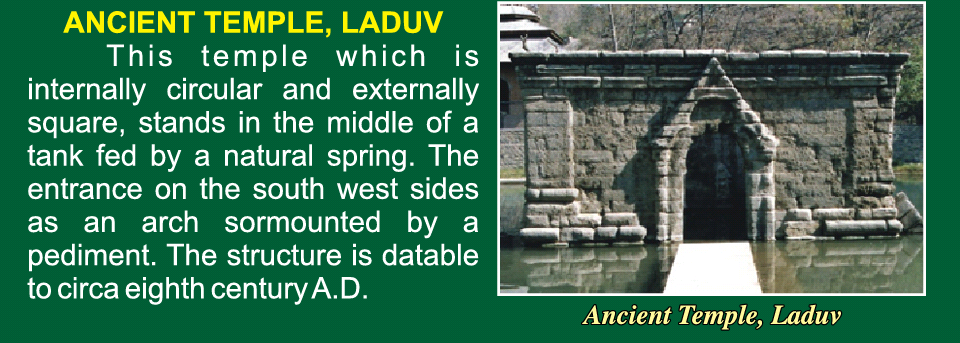
Ancient Temple, Ladhoo
- Avantiswami Temple
- Ancient Temple, Ladhoo
- Jwala Ji Temple at Khrew

== Shopian District ==
- Kapalmochan Mandir
- Mangla Mata Mandir at Wachi

== Srinagar District ==
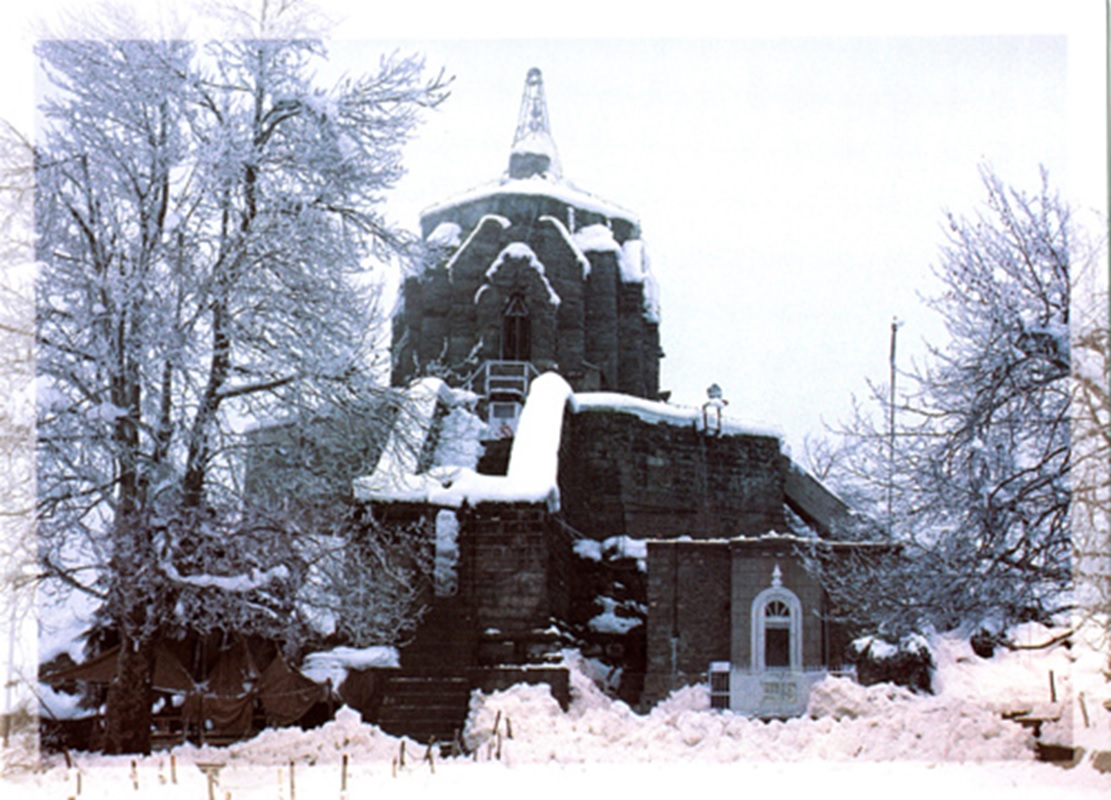
Shankaracharya Temple

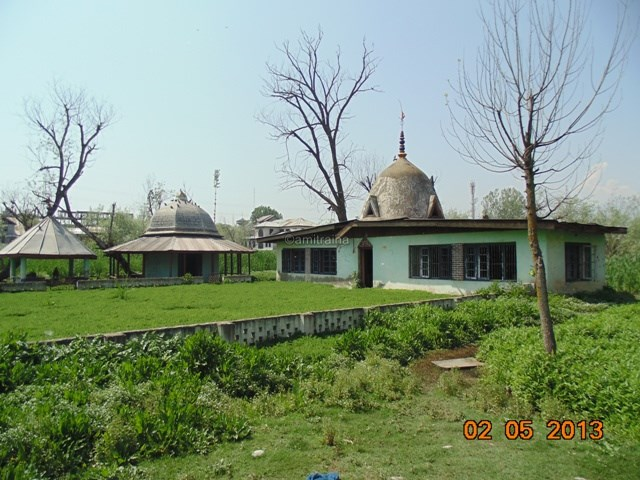
Vichar Nag

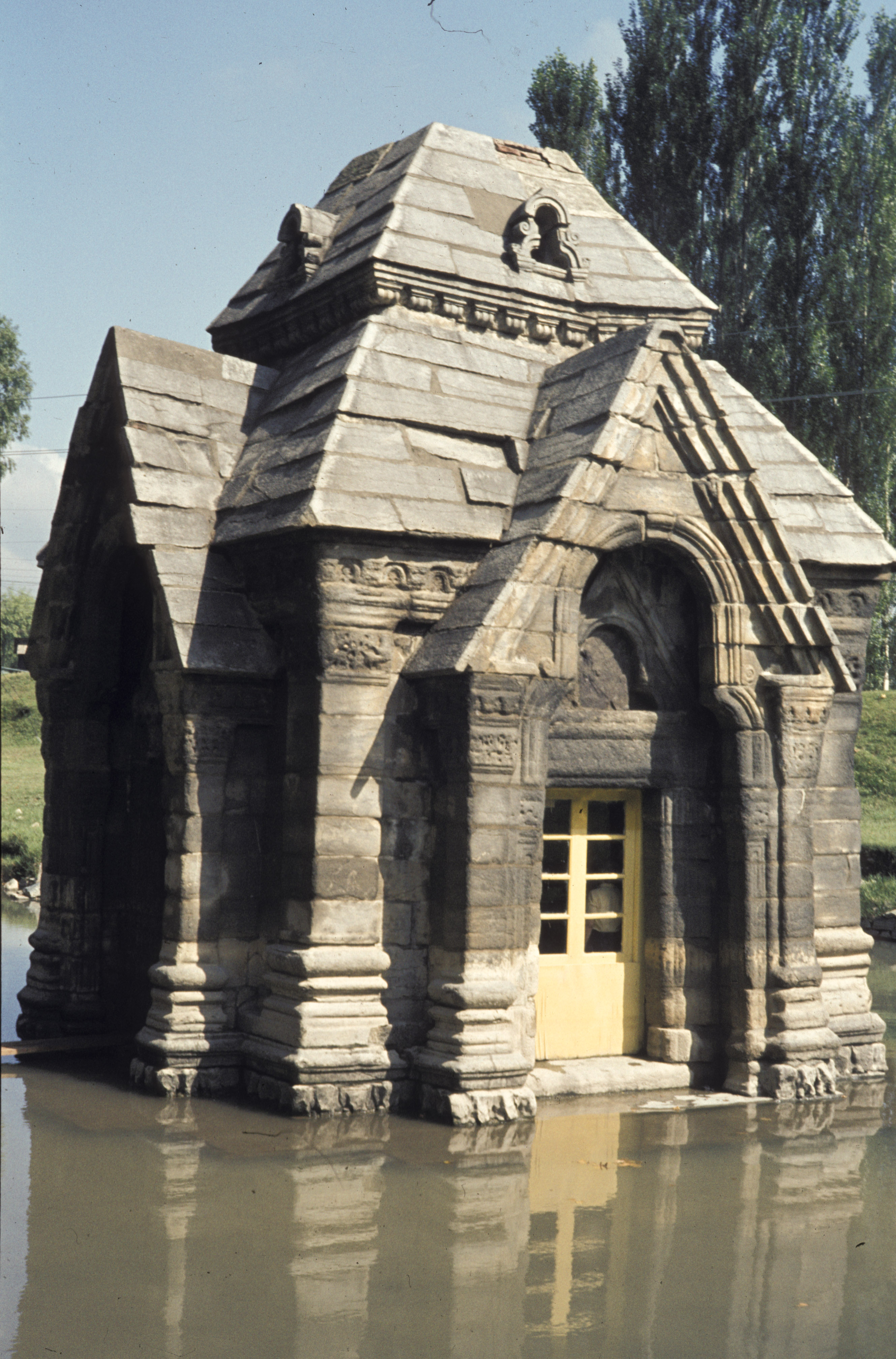
Pandrethan Shiva Temple

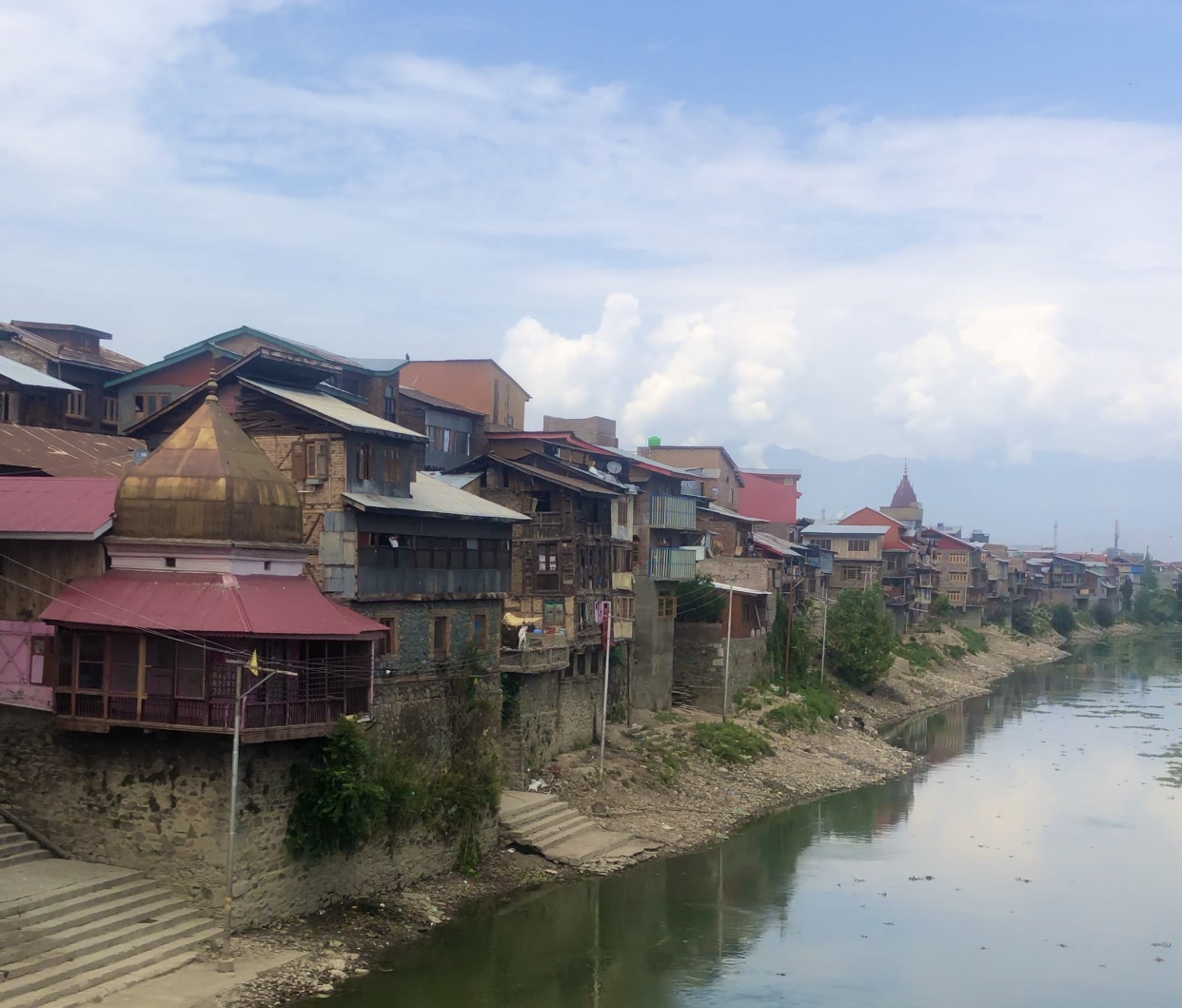
Purshyar Mandir

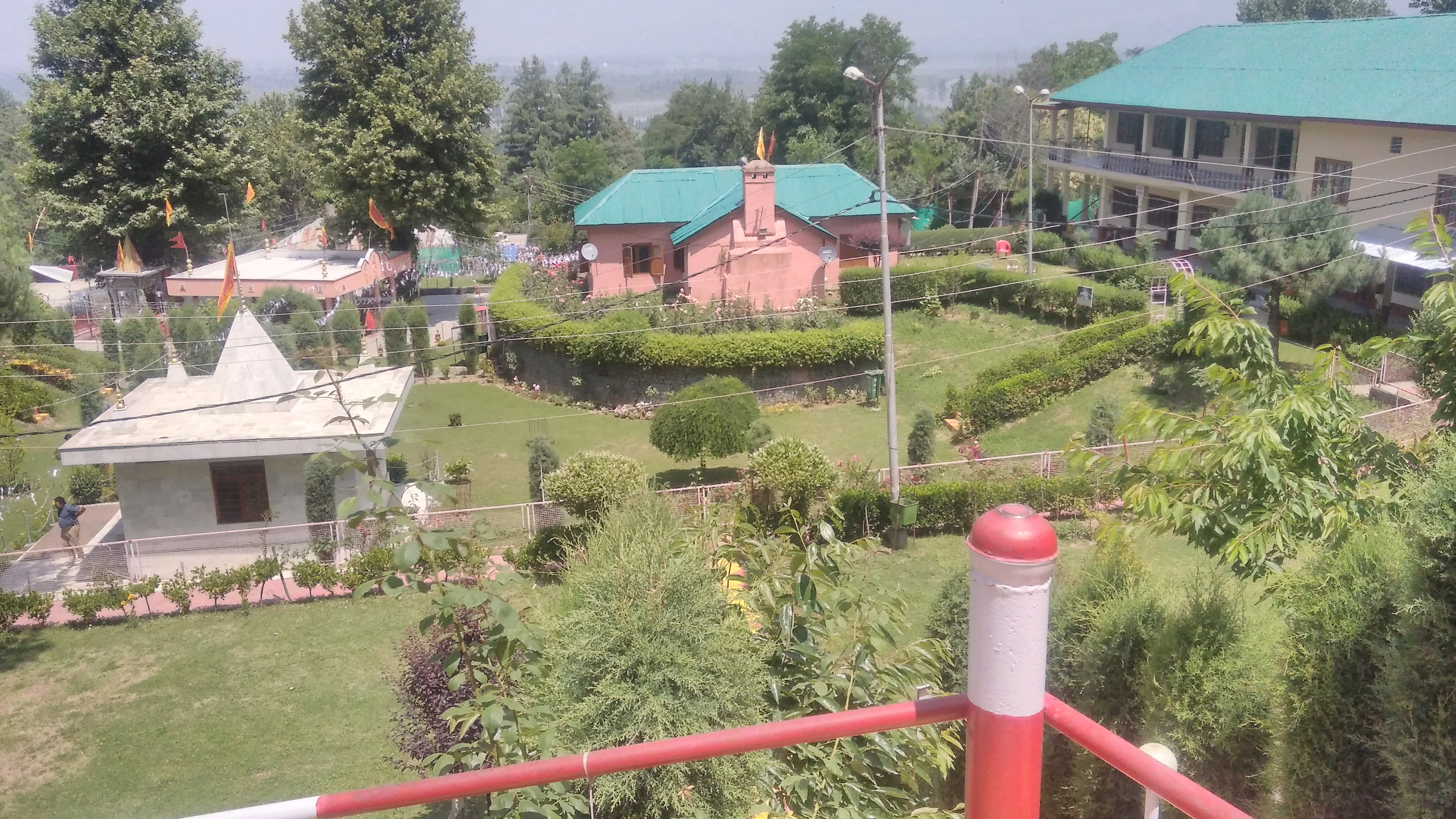
Zeashta Devi Shrine

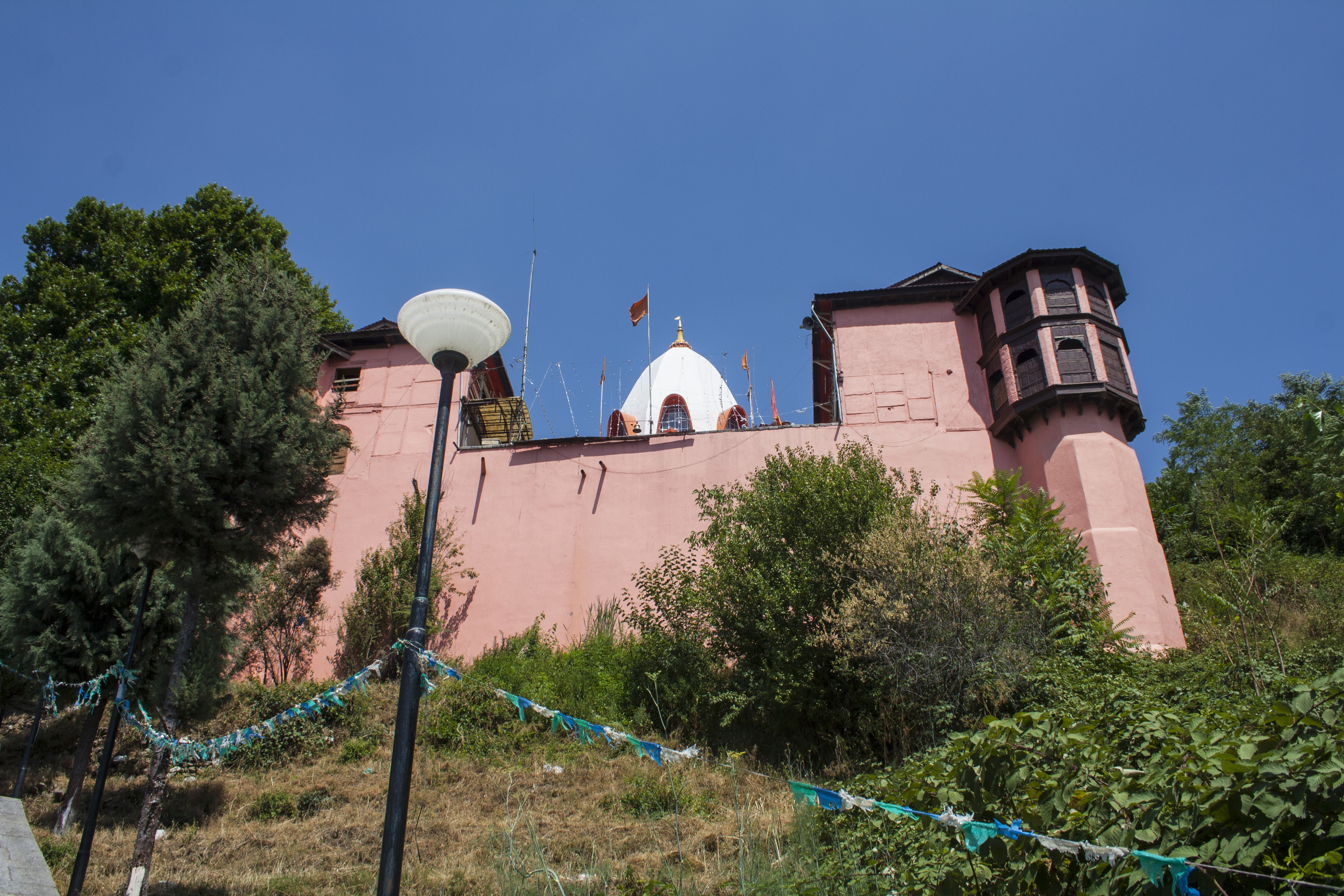
Sharika Mata Temple at Hari Parbat
- Shankaracharya Temple
- Hari Parbat
- Zeashta Devi Shrine
- Vichar Nag
- Pandrethan Shiva Temple
- Purshyar Mandir
- Raghunath Mandir
