= Samboora, Jammu and Kashmir =

Samboora Pulwama Samboora
- Town
- Location in Jammu and Kashmir, India Samboora Pulwama (India)
- Coordinates: 33.962997°N 74.927238°E
- Country: India
- State: Jammu and Kashmir
- District: Pulwama
- Elevation: 1,590 m (5,220 ft)

Population (2011)
  - Total: 5,216

Languages
  - Official: Urdu
- Time zone: UTC+5:30 (IST)
- Vehicle registration: JK13

Samboora or Sombur is a village in Pampore Tehsil of Pulwama district in the Indian union territory of Jammu and Kashmir. and is 1.3 far from Srinagar- Kanyakumari national highway (NH44) & located on Srinagar - Pulwama district road. The area comes under the rural area of Saffron town Pampore.

== Geography ==
It has an average elevation of 1,574 metres (5,164 feet). The town is situated on the eastern bank of Veth also known as Jehlum (in Urdu).

== Demographics ==
As of 2001 India census, Samboora had a population of 4,695. Males constitute 52% of the population and females 48%. Samboora has an average literacy rate of 59%, lower than the national average of 59.5%: male literacy is 75%, and female literacy is 49%. In Samboora, 7% of the population is under 6 years of age. Some nearby villages are Chandhara, Konibal, Shaheed Khalil-ul-Rehman Colony, Meej, Shaheed Saqib-Shuib Road, Alocabagh, Hatiwaea, Androssa, Gundbal, Ladhoo, Patalbagh, and Wuyan, Gulzarpora (Chutlum).

== Culture ==
The town was home to two of the most famous Kashmiri women poets Lala Ded and Habba Khatoon (commonly known as Zoon), the latter lived in a village called Chandhara just outside Samboora.

Ganaie Mohallah, Gausia Colony is also located in Aallochi-Bagh Samboora and Sulaiman colony is located at Mehboob Nagar Samboora. Some recent colonies are formed like ALAMDAR COLONY Narastaan and an old one called HORAANG PORA IN SAGRIPORA Samboora and Umar colony (Chuna Mill) Samboora.

== Religion ==
In the recent years a number of religious seminaries, small and big, owing allegiance to different sects have sprung up in Pampore town. But in most of them the students are mostly from other remoter towns. There are two high schools running in the town and a high secondary run by the government. In fact, the modern English medium schools run by one or two of the bigger seminaries, a public high school run by FALAHI AAM TRUST an educational wing.

== Economy ==
Agriculture is the main occupation of the people in Samboora. The town is famous for its saffron fields, which people say produce the world's best saffron. There is hardly any industry worth mentioning. But people are by and large, as in the rest of Kashmir, not poor - a good number may even be called quite well off by South Asian standards.

== Schools ==
Some of the schools in Samboora are: Government Higher Secondary School (Boys), Samboora; Government Higher Secondary School (Girls), Samboora; Zaffron Public Secondary School Samboora, Islamia School etc.
