= Ladhoo =

Village in Jammu & Kashmir, India

Ladhoo Ladhu Loduv
- Village
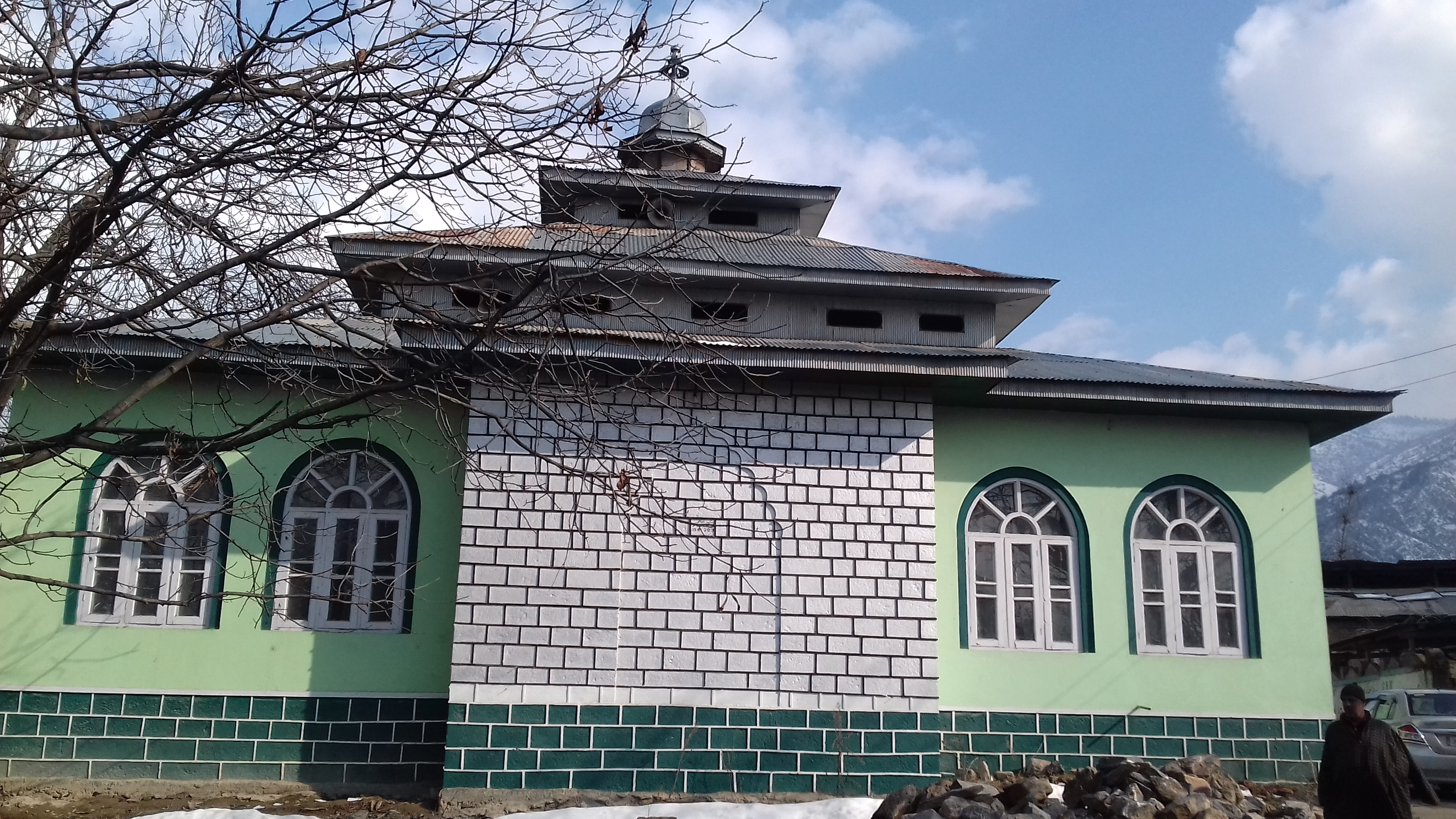

- Location in Jammu & Kashmir, India Ladhoo (India)
- Coordinates: 34.00°N 75.00°E
- Country: India
- State: Jammu & Kashmir
- District: Pulwama

Area
  - Total: 9 km^{2} (3.5 sq mi)
- Elevation: 1,592 m (5,223 ft)

Population (2011)
  - Total: 4,602

Languages
  - Official: Kashmiri, Urdu, English
- Time zone: UTC+5:30 (IST)
- PIN: 191103
- Telephone code: 01933
- Vehicle registration: JK 13
- Literacy: 65.33%

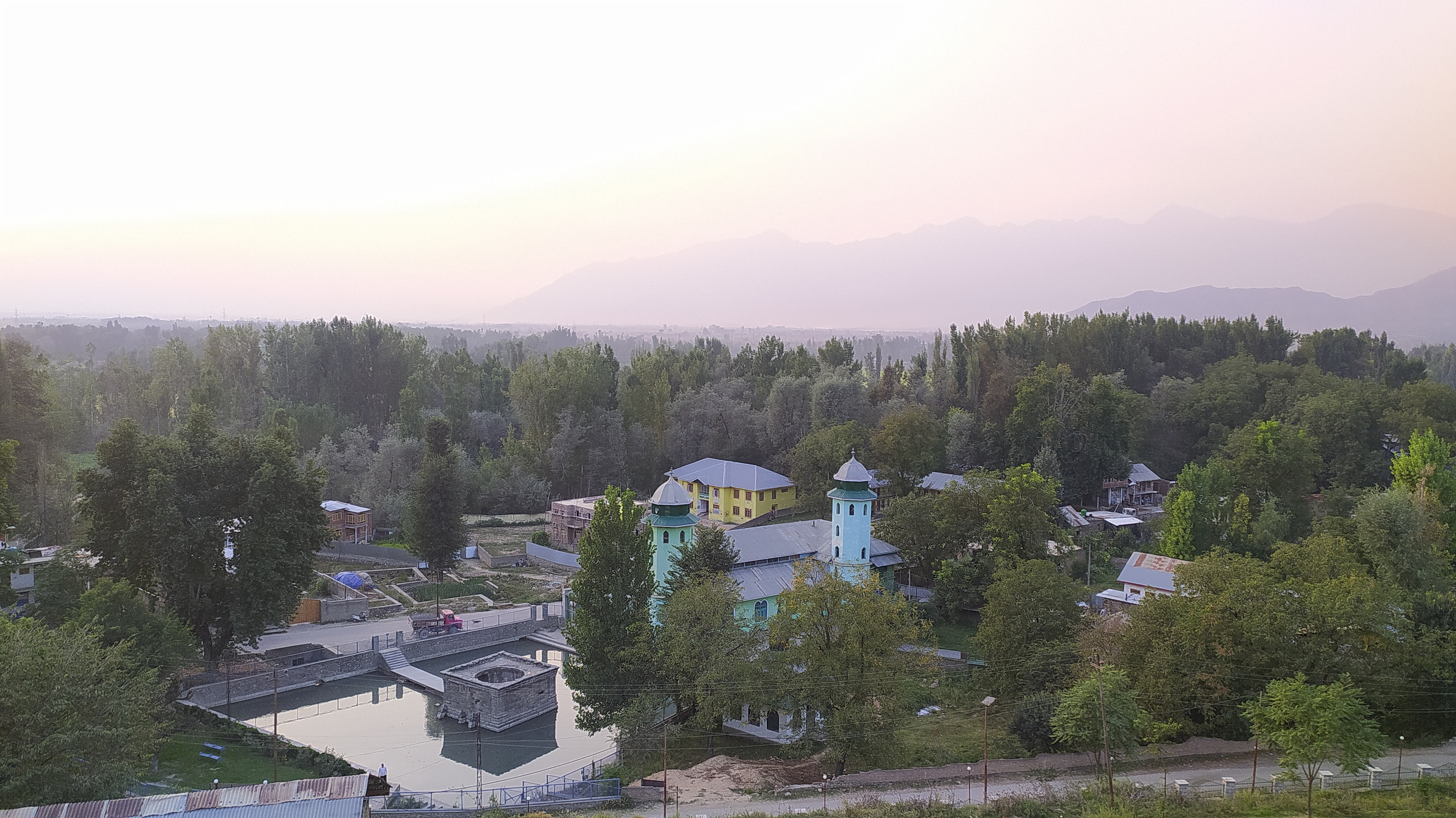
Hotspot of Ladhoo

Ladhoo (or Ladhu) is a village in the Pulwama district of Jammu and Kashmir, India. It is situated on the Jhelum River and is one of the largest villages in the Pampore Constituency. It is 18 km (11 mi) from Srinagar and 4 km (2.5 mi) from NH44 via Lethpora. It has an area of 9 km^{2} (3.5 sq mi).

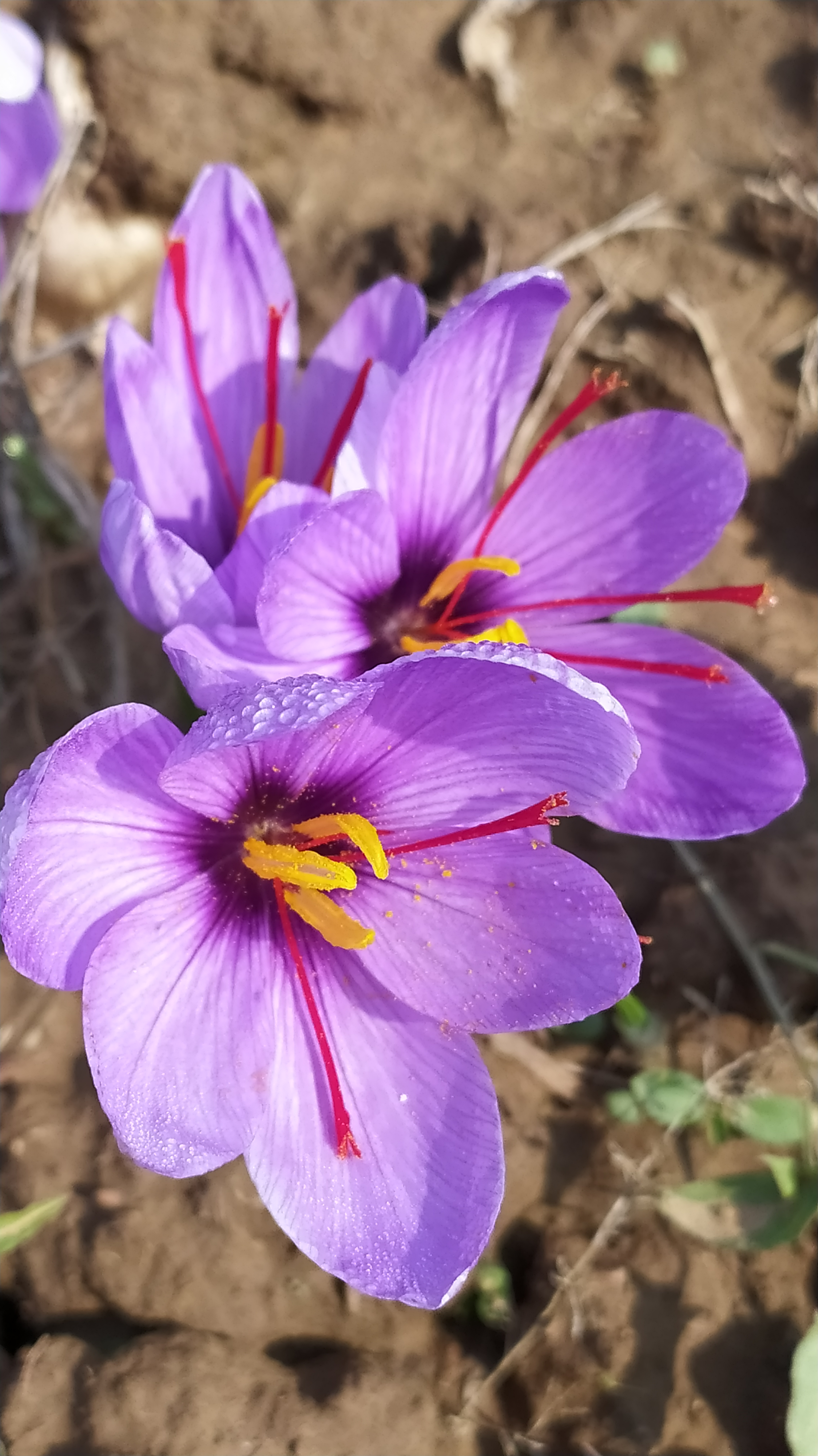
Blooming saffron flowers

As of the census of 2011, the population was 4,604. The male-to-female ratio was 1,000:973.

== Literacy ==
The literacy rate of Ladhoo is 65.33%. Male literacy is 77.83% and female literacy is 52.8%.

== Religion ==
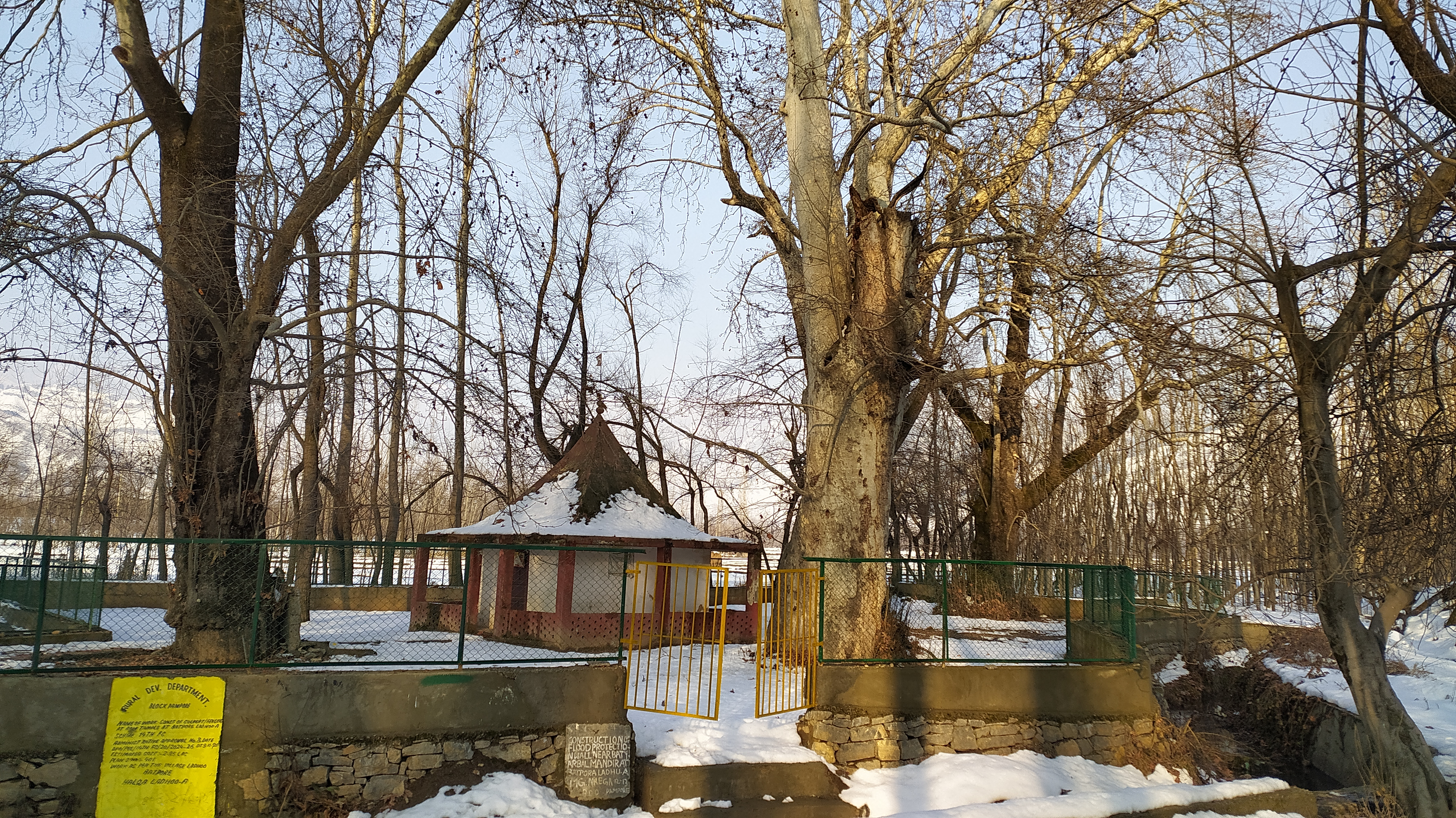
Shiva Temple, Ladhoo

The majority of the population is Muslim, with a Hindu minority. There are around 15 mosques and four temples built in the village and among them is the Ancient Temple which is included in the list of historical monuments of India and is under the care of the Archaeological Survey of India (ASI), circle Srinagar. The other notable religious sites of the village include Sheikh-ul-Alam shrine and the Samadhi Of Jeevan Sahib.

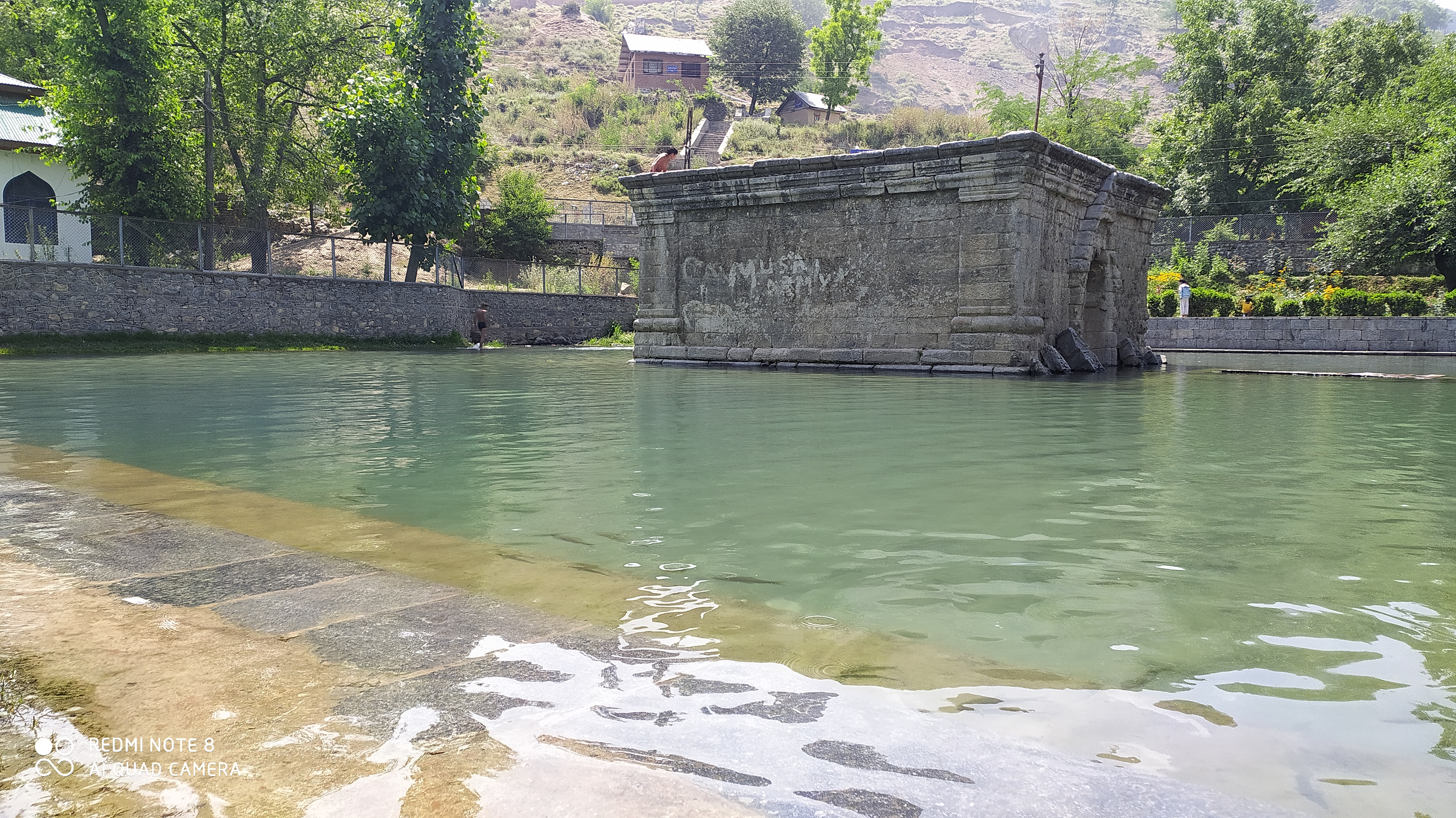
Sanz Haer Nag, Ladhoo

== Important locations ==
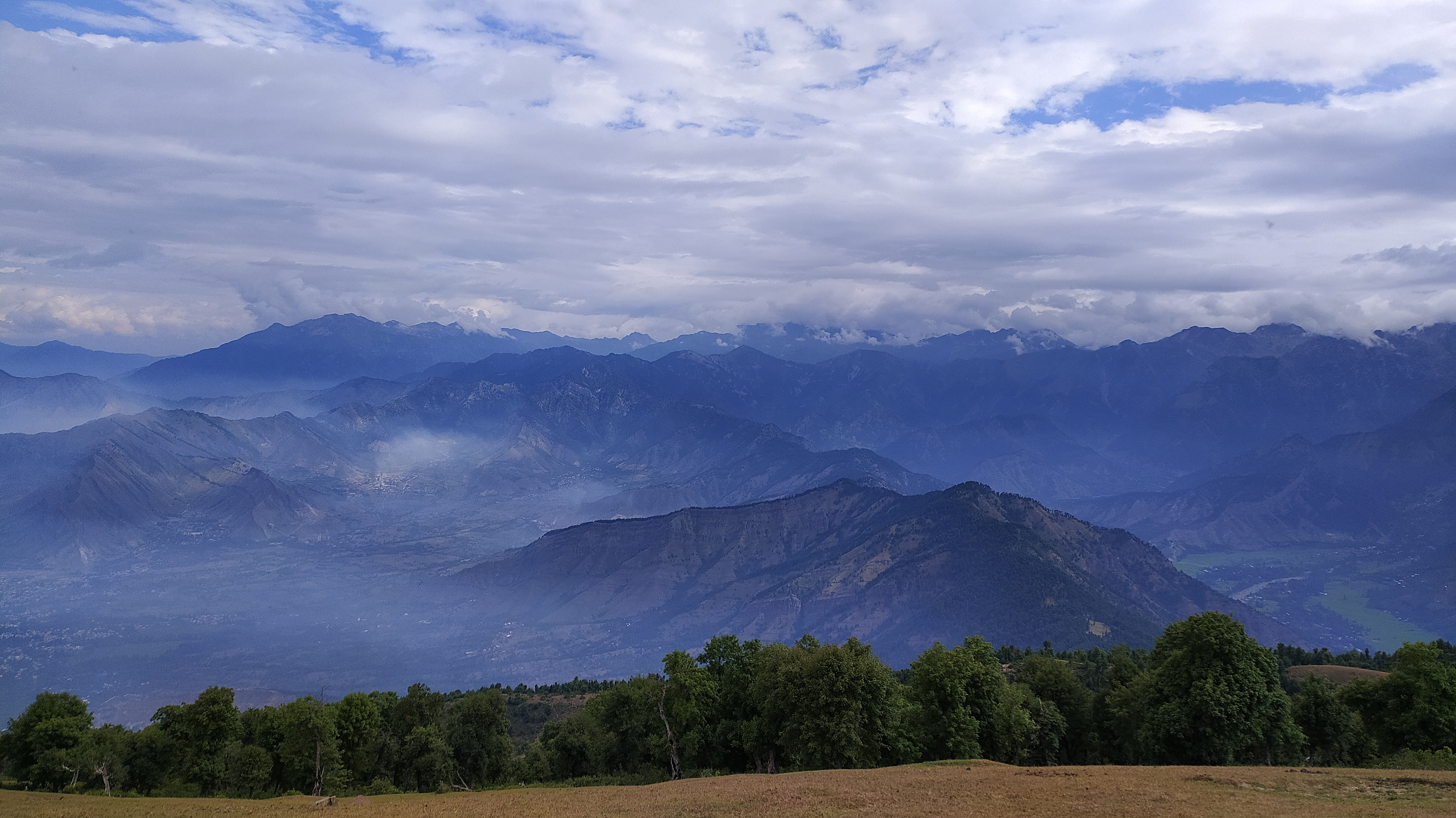

The Ancient Temple is located near a pond named Sanz Har Nag and dates back to the 8th century. The temple is externally square but circular internally. The southwest entrance has an arch surmounted by a pediment. Considering the topology, nature has designed this village so adequate that it had remained the seat of learning for many saints and Sufis and get spiritual enlightenment, one among them is one of the valleys is a highly praised Sufi saint in Islam popularly known as Alamdare Kashmir Sheikh-ul-Aalam also known as Nund Rishi has spent an ample amount of time here (12 years), other famous Sufi saints visited here include Mir Syed Ali Hamadani, Baba Raqam Dim and Jeevan Sahib.

Ladhoo is also near a hiking spot known as Wasturwan.
