= Zeashta Devi Shrine =

Jyeshteshvari Temple
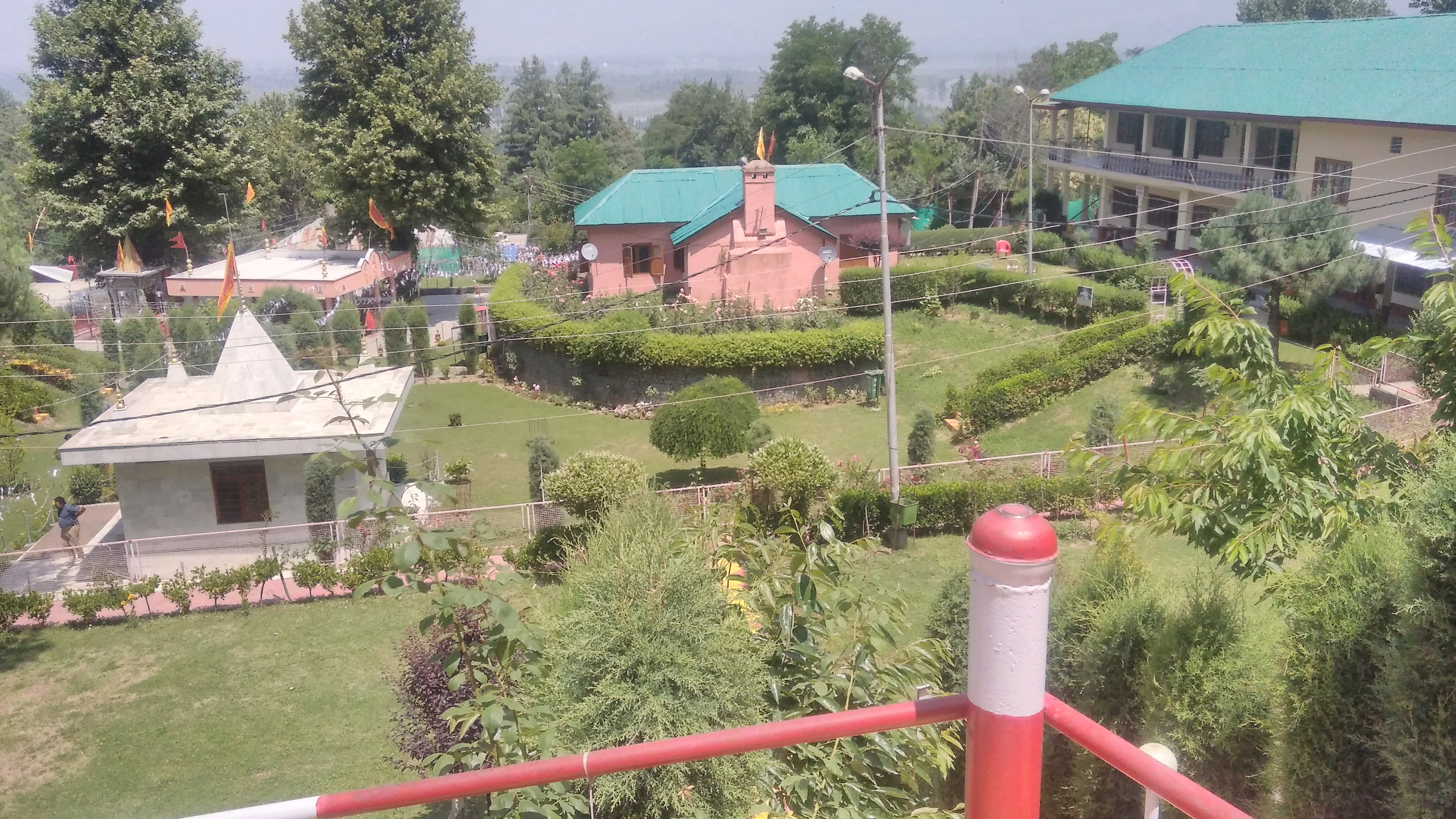
- Zeashta Devi Shrine

- Location in Jammu and Kashmir

Religion
- Affiliation: Hinduism
- District: Srinagar
- Deity: Goddess Jyeshteshwari

Location
- Location: Srinagar
- State: Jammu and Kashmir
- Country: India
- Interactive map of Jyeshteshvari Temple
- Coordinates: 34°4′41.6388″N 74°52′21.5328″E

Architecture
- Established: 1968 (Present structure)
- Inscriptions: Śāradā script
- Elevation: 1,700 m (5,577 ft)

Website
- www.zeashtadevi.com

Zeashta Devi Shrine (Kashmiri pronunciation: [zeːʃʈʰaː diːʋiː mandar]) or Zeathyar (Kashmiri pronunciation: [ziːʈʰʲ jəːr]) is a Hindu shrine located in Srinagar in the Indian union territory of Jammu and Kashmir. Primarily dedicated to a form of Shakti, Jyeshta/Zeashta Devi (not to be confused with Jyeshta), this temple has been held in high reverence by Kashmiri Pandits since ancient times.

== History ==
According to British archaeologist M.A. Stein, a shrine dedicated to Shiva was constructed on Gopadri hill by King Gopaditya, known as the Jyeshtarudra Temple. While referring to Kalhana's Rajatarangini and archaeological evidences, he explains that one mile from the east foot of the hill lay the related tirtha of Jyeshteshvara, which in Kashmiri is now known as Zeathyar. It was in this vicinity where King Jalauka might have founded the city of Srinagari, though there is no strong archaeological evidence to prove it. He further mentions, "This Tirtha which undoubtedly derives its name from Jyeṣṭeśvara, lies in a glen of the hill-side, a short distance from the east shore of the Gagri Bal portion of the Dal." Fragments of ancient Lingas in the vicinity of the shrine point towards the temple originally being a Shiva shrine, gradually transforming into a prime Shakti peeth.

== Gallery ==
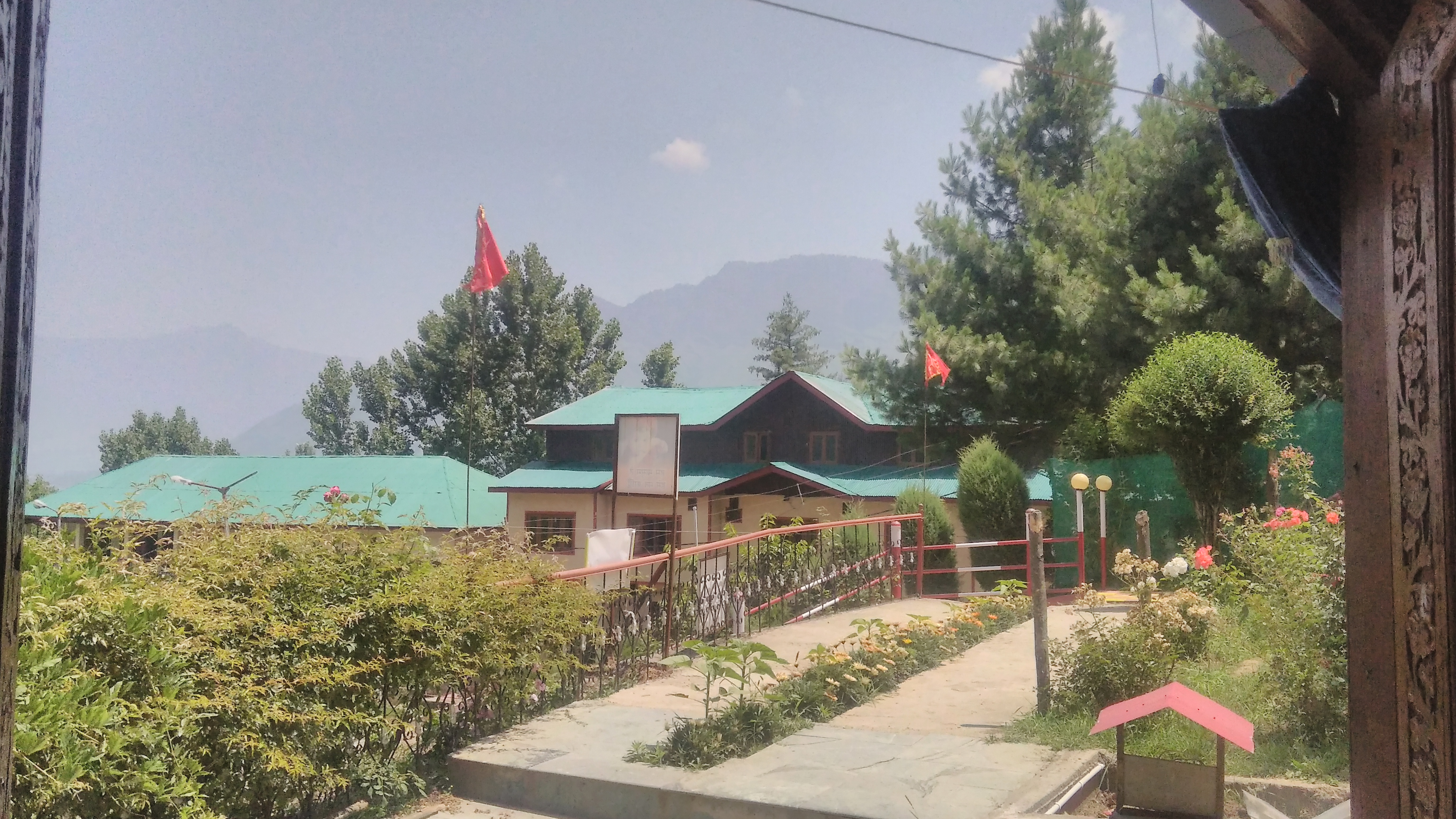

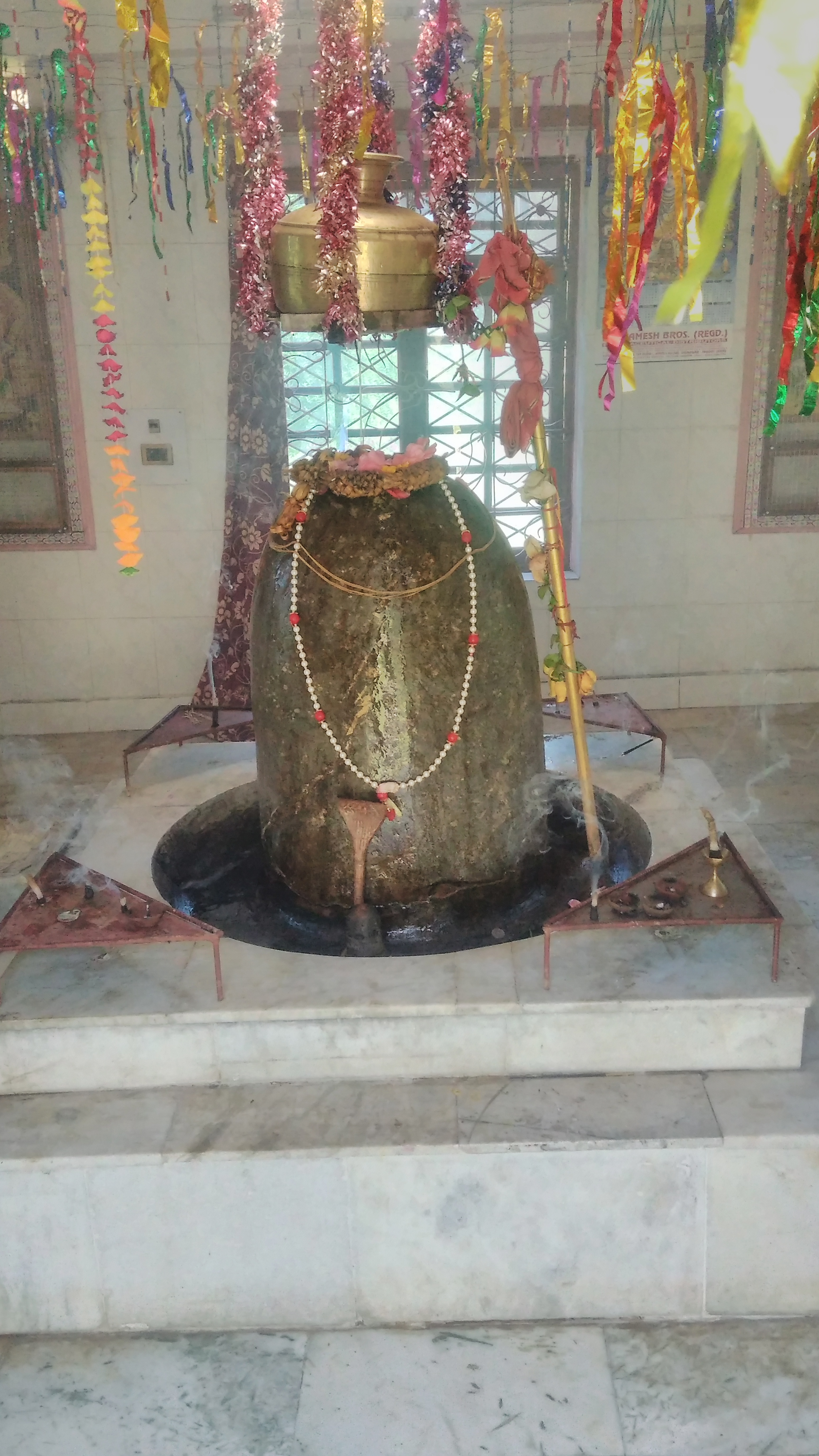

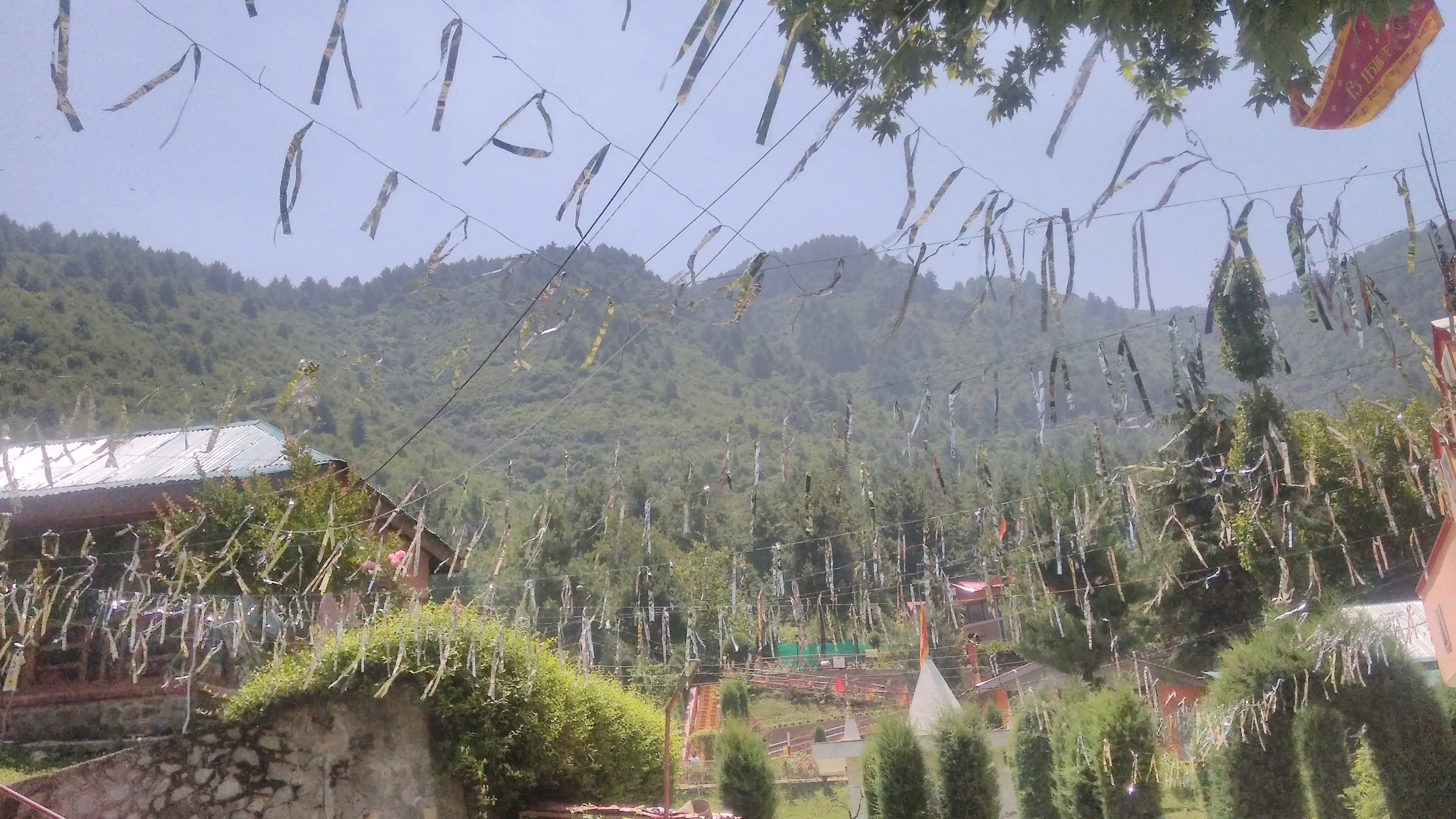

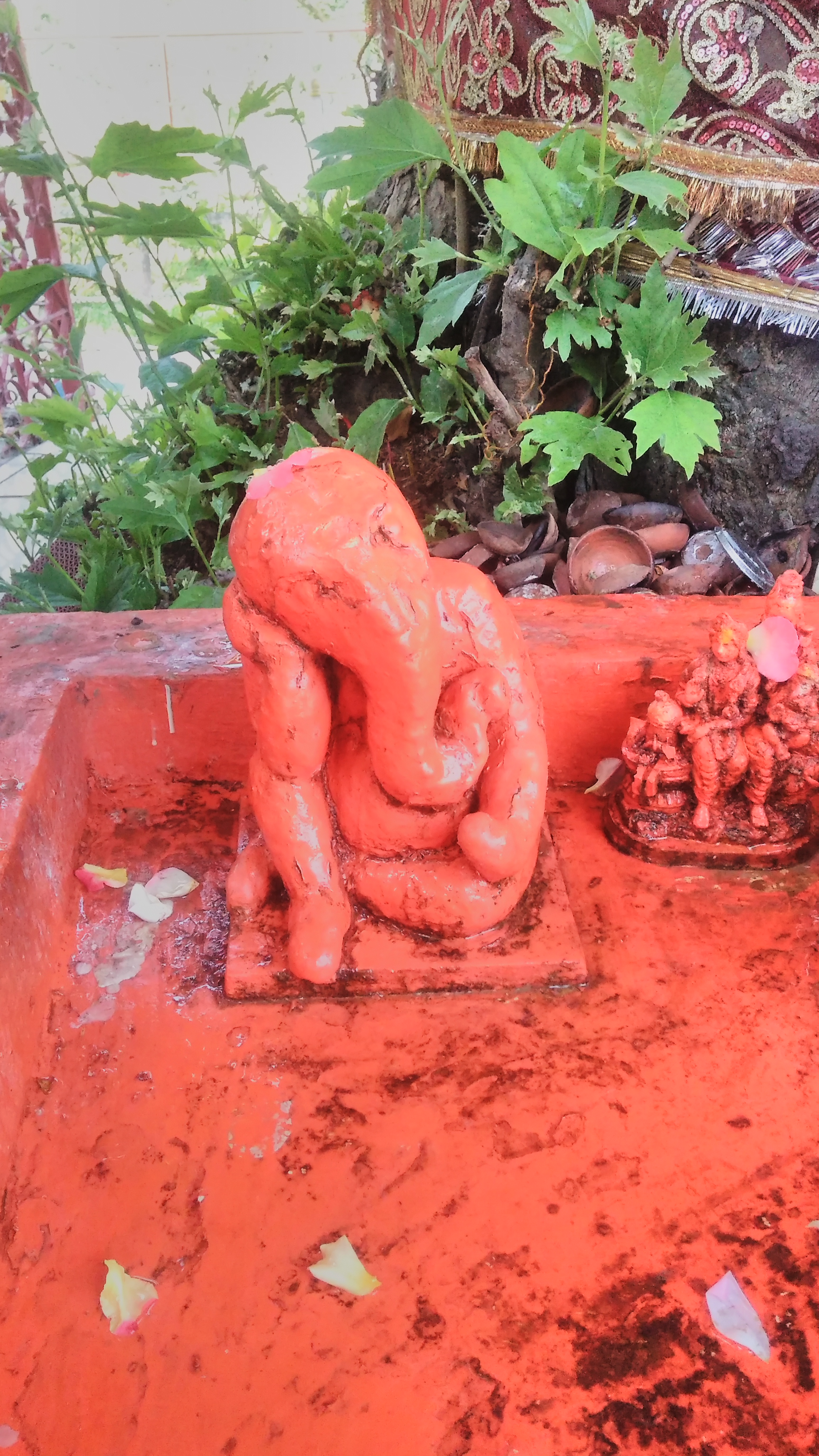

== See also ==
- History of Kashmir
- Exodus of Kashmiri Hindus
