= Ancient Temple, Ladhoo =

Indian temple in Jammu and Kashmir

- Ladhoo Temple
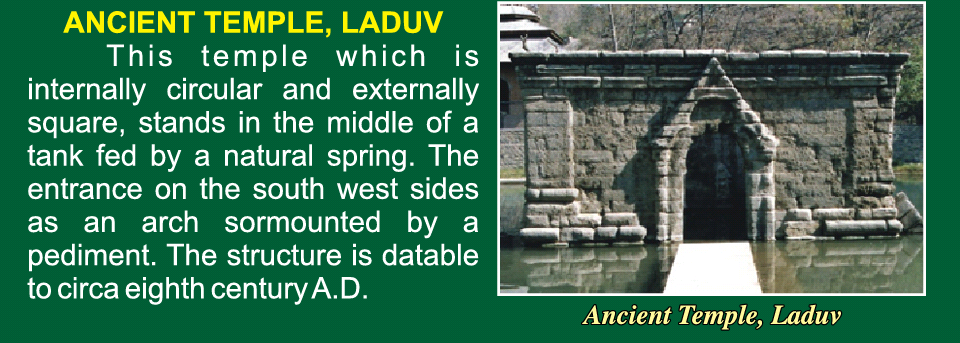
- The Ancient Temple, Ladhoo; Ancient Temple

- Location in Jammu & Kashmir, India Ancient Temple, Ladhoo (India)

Religion
- Affiliation: Hinduism
- District: Pulwama

Location
- Location: Ladhoo
- State: Jammu and Kashmir
- Country: India
- Coordinates: 33°59′32.0″N 74°59′36.9″E

Architecture
- Creator: Lalitaditya Muktapida
- Completed: 8th century CE
- Elevation: 1,592 m (5,223 ft)

Ancient Temple, Ladhoo, is located in the middle of a natural fed pond or spring known as Sanz Haer Nag or Sanyasar Nag in Ladhoo, a village in the Pulwama district of the southern part of the Kashmir Valley of the Indian union territory of Jammu and Kashmir. It is four km (2.5 mi) away from NH44 via Lethapora and 18 km (11 mi) from Srinagar.

The temple is listed among List of Monuments of National Importance in Jammu and Kashmir. It has also been attributed by other including, Sun Temple or Jeevanath Temple or Shiv temple, but these names found no historical proof. Thus, the monument remained entitled as 'The Ancient Temple, Ladhoo' in the documents of Archaeological Survey of India.

This temple is externally square and internally circular in shape. The entrance which faces the southwest has an arch surmounted pediment. This archaeological monument is datable to circa 8th century A.D. The monument and the pond including a small park is fenced and maintained by Archaeological Survey of India, circle srinagar, Jammu.

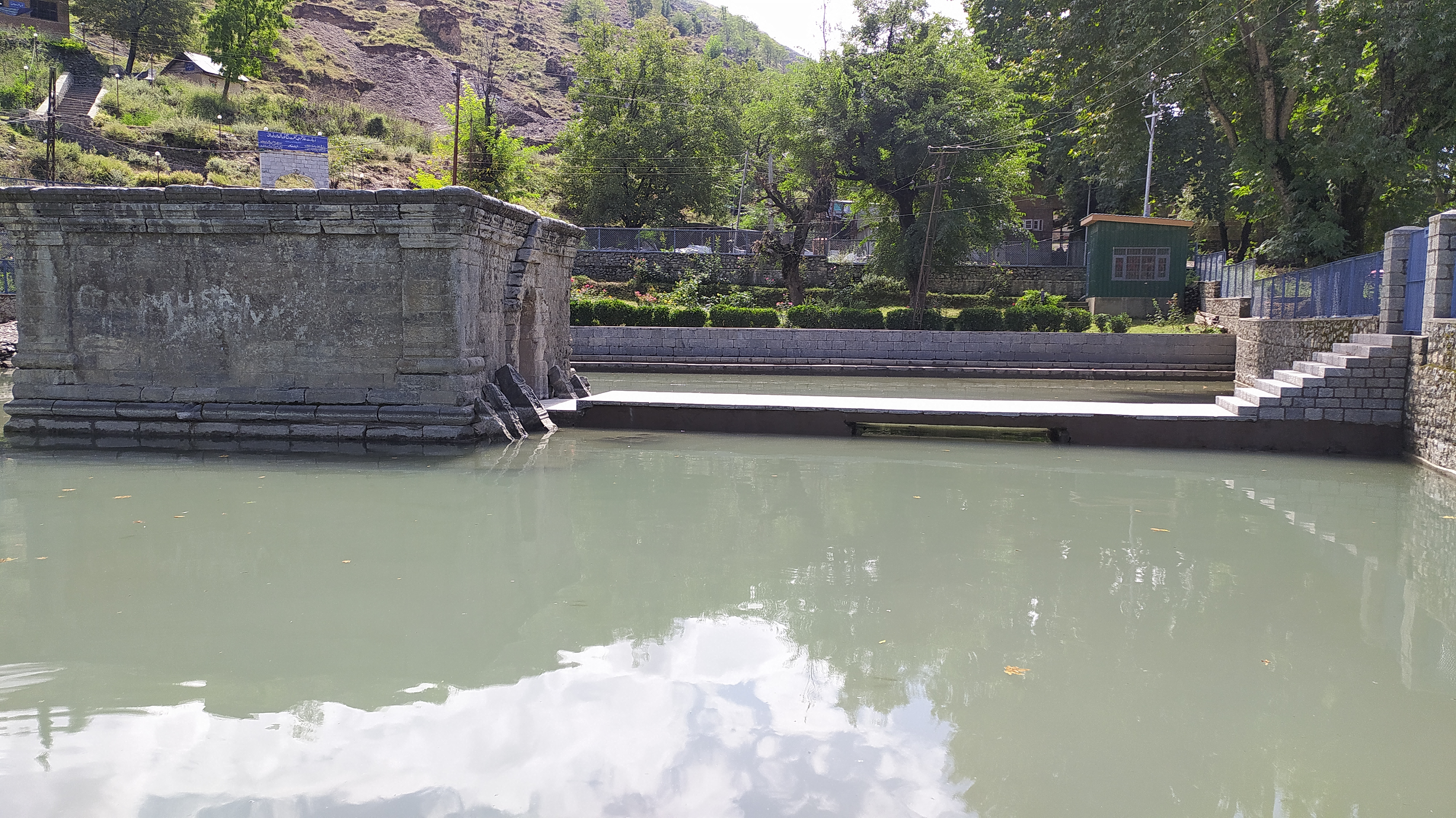

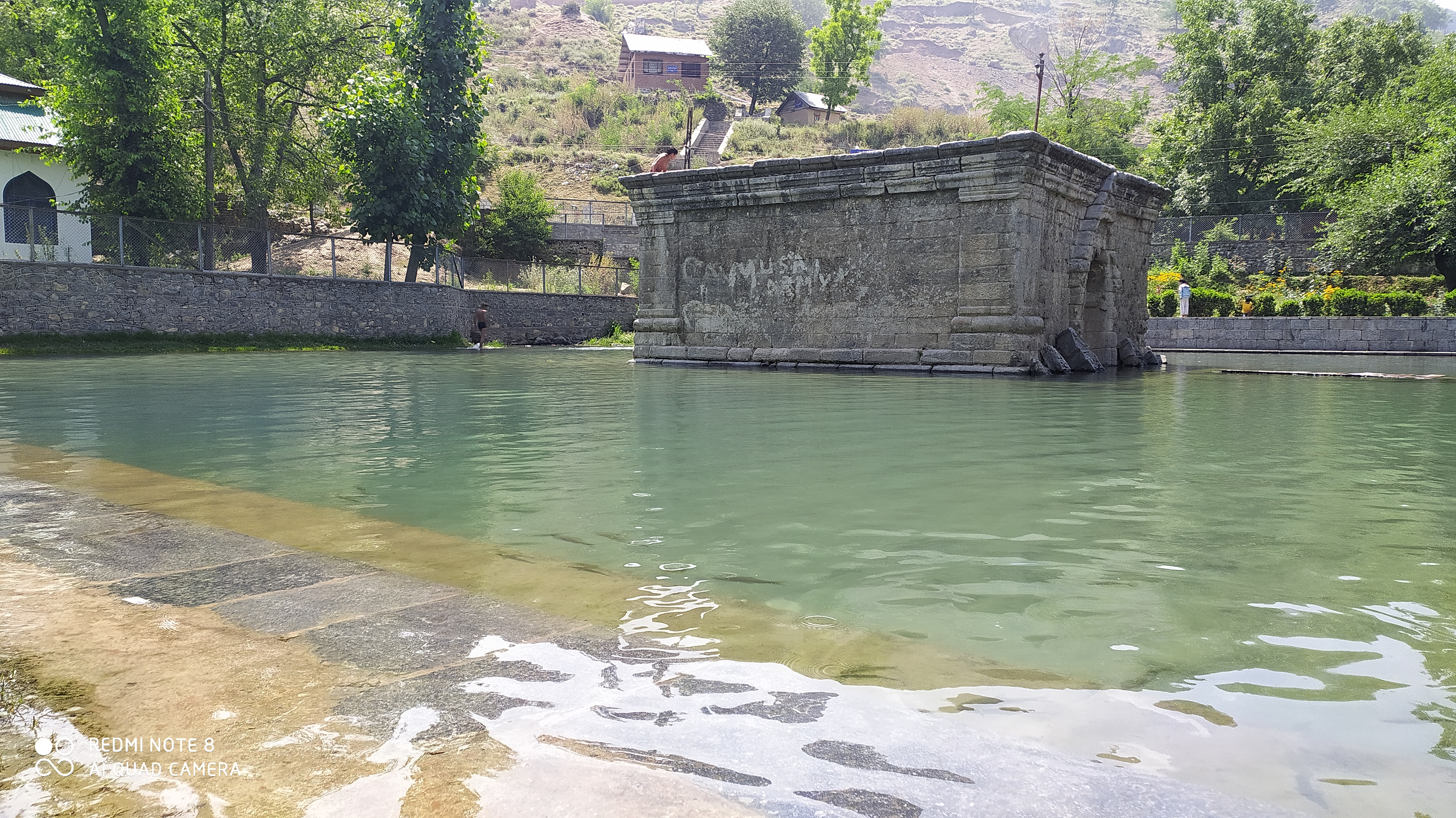
