= Mamal Temple =

Hindu temple in Kashmir Valley, India

Mamaleshwar Temple
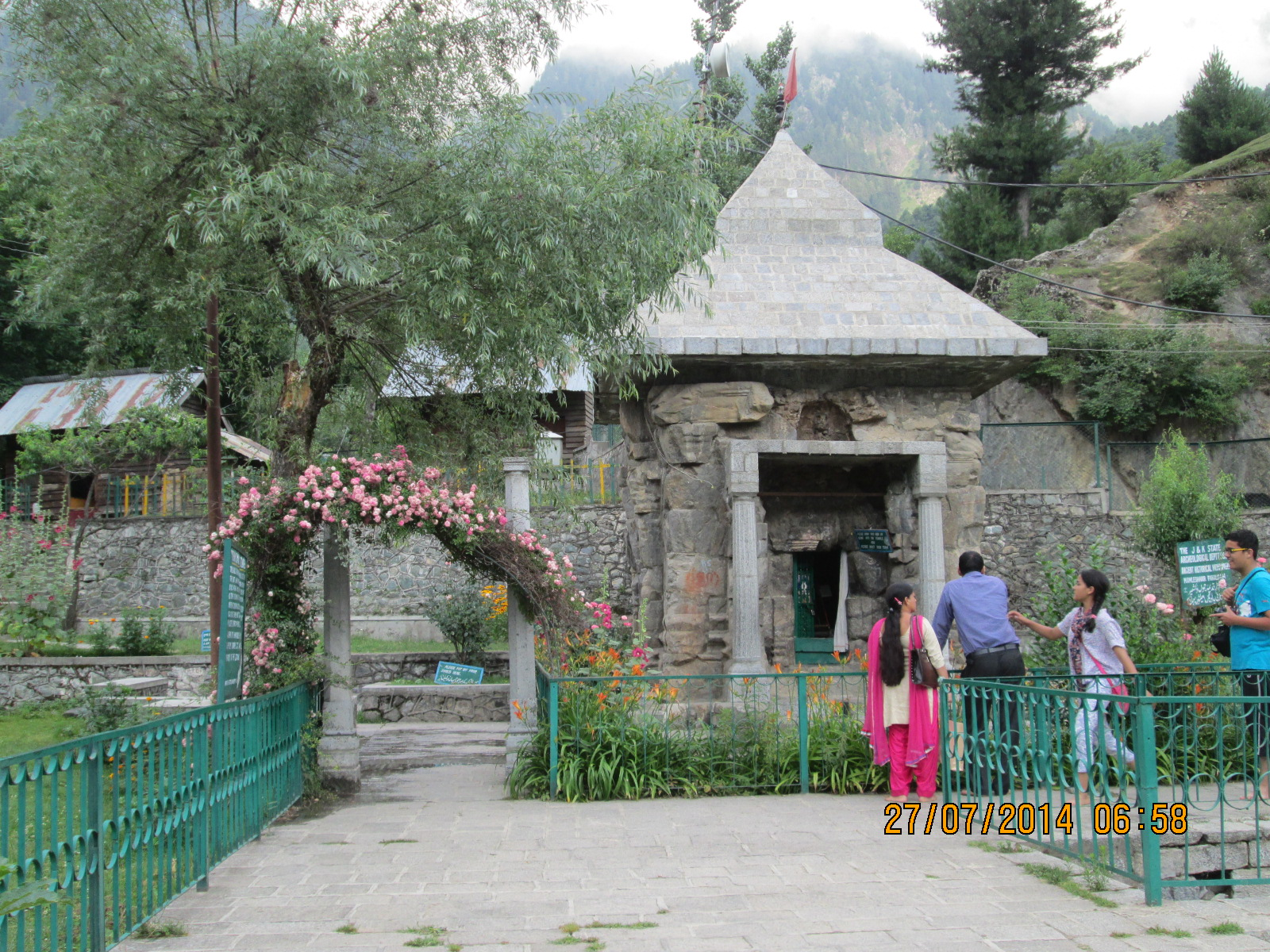
- Mamaleshwar Temple during summers

Religion
- Affiliation: Hinduism
- District: Anantnag district
- Deity: Shiva
- Status: Open

Location
- Location: Pahalgam
- State: Jammu and Kashmir
- Country: India
- Interactive map of Mamaleshwar Temple
- Coordinates: 34.009771°N 75.311833°E

Architecture
- Type: Indian architecture
- Style: Kashmiri
- Established: 400 AD

Mamal Temple or Mamaleshwar Temple is a Hindu temple, located in Pahalgam town in Kashmir Valley. It is situated on the banks of Lidder River at an elevation of 2,200 metres (7,200 ft). According to legend, this is the temple where Ganesha was placed as door keeper by Parvati, not allowing anyone to enter the premises without her permission. This is the place where Shiva cut the head of Ganesha and gave him an elephant head.

There are 2 idols inside the temple. One is a Shiva Linga at the center of the temple and a small two face idol of Nandi on the right corner. Mam Mal means don't go, and thus it is also known as Mammal temple.

== History ==
This temple was constructed around 400 AD (1,600 years ago) and was reconstructed and opened for worship in the medieval period. The Rajatarangini refers to a temple called Mammesvara and recorded its decoration with a golden kalasa at its top by king Jayasimha.

== Legend ==
According to legend, this is the temple where Ganesha was placed as door keeper by Parvati, not allowing anyone to enter the premises without her permission. This is the place where Shiva cut the head of Ganesha and gave him elephant head. Mam Mal means don't go, and thus it is also known as Mammal temple.
