= Shankaragaurishvara Temple =

Hindu temple in Kashmir, India

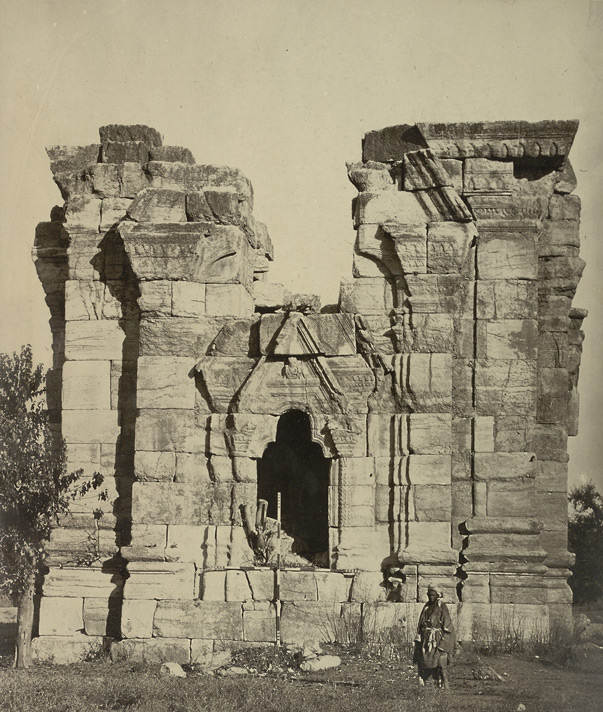
- Shankaragaurishvara Temple

- Location in Jammu and Kashmir, India Shankaragaurishvara Temple (India)

Religion
- Affiliation: Hinduism
- Deity: Shiva

Location
- Location: Pattan, Baramulla
- State: Jammu & Kashmir
- Country: India
- Interactive map of Shankaragaurishvara Temple
- Coordinates: 34.101°N 74.562°E

Architecture
- Type: Kashmiri architecture
- Creator: Shankaravarman
- Completed: 9th–10th century
- Temple: 2

The Shankaragaurishvara Temple is a 9th century Hindu temple attributed to the Utpala dynasty. The temple is dedicated to the Hindu god, Shiva and located in Pattan, in the Baramulla district of Jammu and Kashmir, India. The temple was built by king Shankaravarman of the Utpala dynasty of Kashmir, who ruled between 883 and 902 AD.

The temple is in a dilapidated condition and worship is no longer conducted. It is built in a style similar to the Shankaracharya Temple. It is listed as one of the more than 15 important temples for promotion of tourism in the state of Jammu and Kashmir.

== History ==
The temple was built by king Shankaravarman (883–902). His father Avantivarman had established the Utpala dynasty and after his death in 883 his son succeeded him. He built the temple in his capital city, then known as Shankarapattana, which is the present-day Patan, 27 kilometres (17 mi) away from Srinagar city, the capital of Jammu and Kashmir. He dedicated the temple to Lord Shiva. It is named after the king himself. His religious affiliation was of Hindu Shaivism. Apart from this temple, he also built another temple, next to it, in honour of his wife and named it the Sugandhesha Temple, which was also dedicated to Lord Shiva; built to the same plan and with intricate carvings. But it is of a much smaller size. Both the temples are seen in a dilapidated condition.

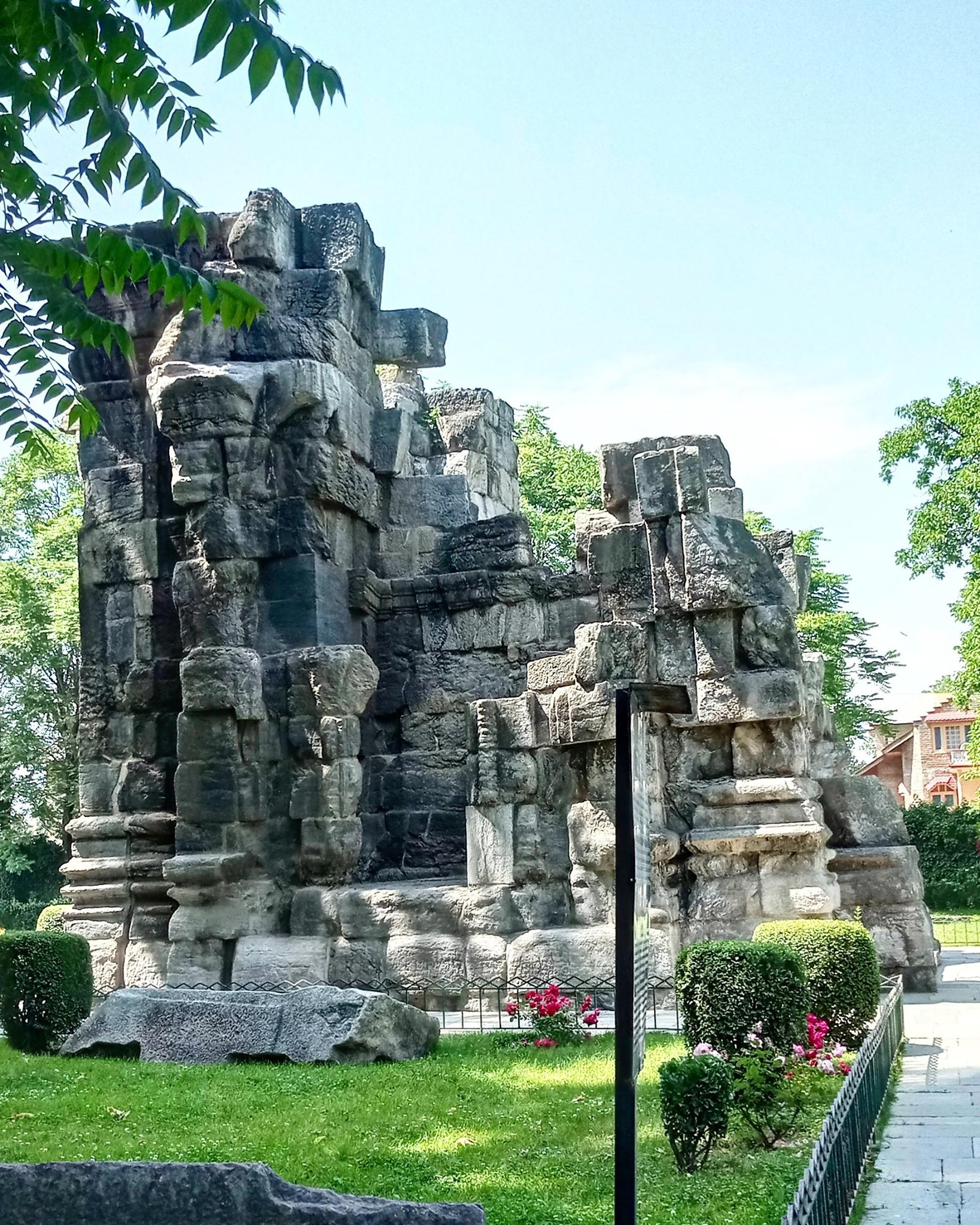
Shankaragaurishvara Temple (Oct 2021)

== Features ==
The temple's entrance porch, facing east, exhibits intricately sculpted carvings both on its exterior fascia as well as in the interior surfaces, and appears as if they are freshly chiseled and carved though built in late ninth century. The pediments are stacked symmetrically one above the other. The columns at the entrance are also elaborately sculpted in an architectural style which is akin to Kashmiri architecture, particularly in relation to the detailing. The plinth of the temple, and of the shrine next to it, is built in a peristyle, an open colonnaded pattern, within a walled enclosure, which is in the form of a cellular passage, remnants of which are still visible.
