= Pandrethan Shiva Temple =

Hindu temple in Jammu and Kashmir, India

Shiva Temple, Pandrethan
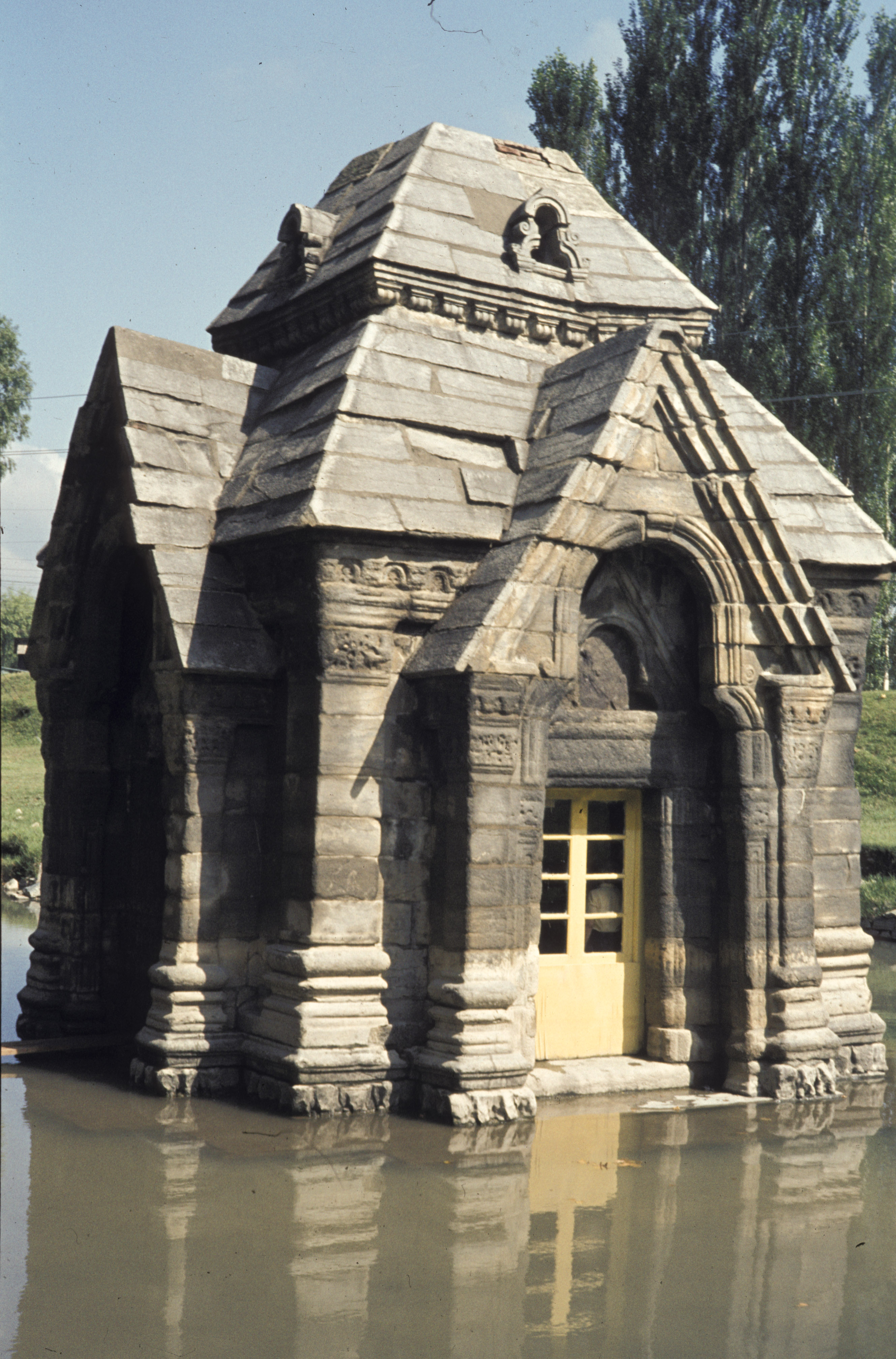
- Shiva Temple at Pandrethan in 1981

- Location in Jammu & Kashmir, India Pandrethan Shiva Temple (India)

Religion
- Affiliation: Hinduism
- Deity: Shiva

Location
- Location: Pandrethan, Srinagar
- State: Jammu & Kashmir
- Country: India
- Coordinates: 34°3′23″N 74°51′39″E

Architecture
- Elevation: 1,614 m (5,295 ft)

The Pandrethan Shiva temple is a Hindu temple dedicated to Shiva at Pandrethan, in the city of Srinagar in Jammu and Kashmir, India. The current structure of the temple dates to c. 8th–9th century CE, and stands at the centre of a tank fed by a natural spring close to the Jhelum River. The temple, though smaller than others, is one of the best preserved of ancient Kashmiri Hindu stone temples.

== History ==
=== Pandrethan ===
Pandrethan has been identified as the original site of the capital city of Srinagar, founded by Ashoka. (Note: Identified by scholars with the Mauryan emperor Ashoka.) During the 6th century CE, the capital was shifted a few kilometres northwest, resulting in the area being called puranadhisthana, meaning 'old capital' in Sanskrit, with Srinagar being used as a name for the new capital. The present name, Pandrethan, is a corruption of the Sankrit name. By the 19th century, the area was littered with ancient ruins. Excavations at Pandrethan on the site of ruins of two Buddhist stupas and a monastery in 1915 resulted in the discovery of several Budhhist sculptures and fragments. During the 1920s, the area was appropriated for military use and cleared of most ruins, and by 1930s military barracks had been built close to the Shiva temple. While digging for building the foundations of these barracks, twenty Hindu sculptures were accidentally discovered, including eight sculptures of Shiva, seated as well as standing, five of Matrika goddesses, and one each of Ganga and Ganesha. These artefacts date variously to the 2nd and 8th century, and later. (Note: Many of these are housed at the Shri Pratap Singh Museum and on site near the temple, while many others have been lost.)

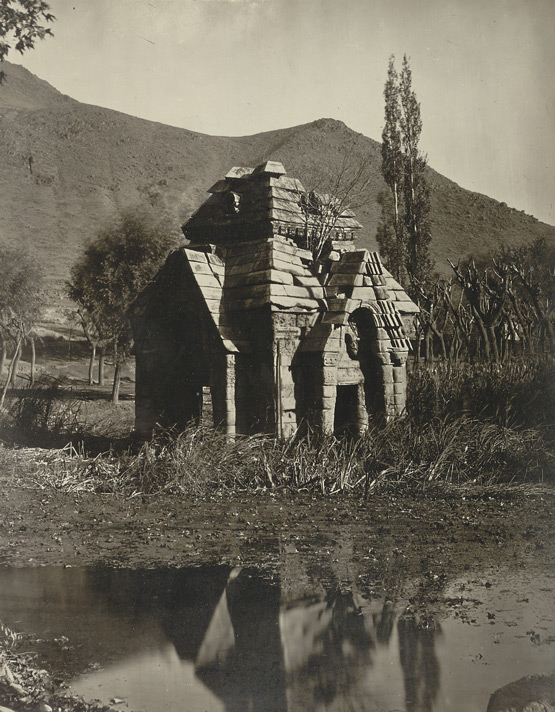
1868 photograph of the Shiva temple at Pandrethan

=== Shiva Temple ===
The present building of the Shiva temple, the only ancient remnant from Pandrethan to survive, was built sometime in the 8th–9th century CE. The temple was originally part of a much larger complex. In 1665, the temple, then in a ruined state, was likely visited by François Bernier during his visit to the Kashmir Valley. During the 19th century, the temple was visited, sketched and photographed by several British and other European visitors, many of whom noted its exceptionally well-preserved stone ceiling. Its smaller size and partially submerged condition may have prevented demolition by later Muslim rulers. The temple's roof had likely sustained some damage from an earthquake in 1828, and possibly from two late 18th century earthquakes earlier.

The temple was earlier wrongly identified by 19th-century colonial visitors as the Meruvardhanaswami temple described in the Rajatarangini of Kalhana, which was built in the 10th century by Meruvardhana, a minister during the rule of the Utpala dynasty. However, the Meruvardhanaswami temple was dedicated to Vishnu, while the temple at Pandrethan is a Shiva temple. Identification of the temple with another, early 12th century Shiva temple mentioned in the Rajatarangini was proposed, but has been rejected by scholars. (Note: Ram Chandra Kak proposed that the temple may be the Rilhaneshwara temple, built in 1135 CE by Rilhan, a minister of Jayasimha. Debala Mitra rejects this saying that the temple does not correspond to any mentioned in the Rajatarangini and dates it to the 10th century or earlier. Susan L. Huntington also disagrees with the 10th or 12th century dating for the temple, instead suggesting an earlier date, as does Robert Fisher.) Based on architectural and stylistic features of the structure and sculptures, scholars date the temple to c. 8th–9th century CE. (Note: Mitra dates it to the 10th century or earlier based on stylistic features of the sculptures; Huntington suggests a probable date of c. 8th–9th century CE based on the style of sculpture in the temple; and Fisher states that the structural style of the temple indicates it dating to the Karkota dynasty, possibly within the rule of Lalitaditya (c. 724 CE–760 CE). John Siudmak dates the temple to 'not earlier than' 8th or 9th century CE based on architectural features of the building.) The temple is currently situated inside an army cantonment called Badami Bagh. In 2021, the temple underwent further restoration and a park was constructed around it to exhibit artefacts excavated from its surrounding area.

== Architecture ==
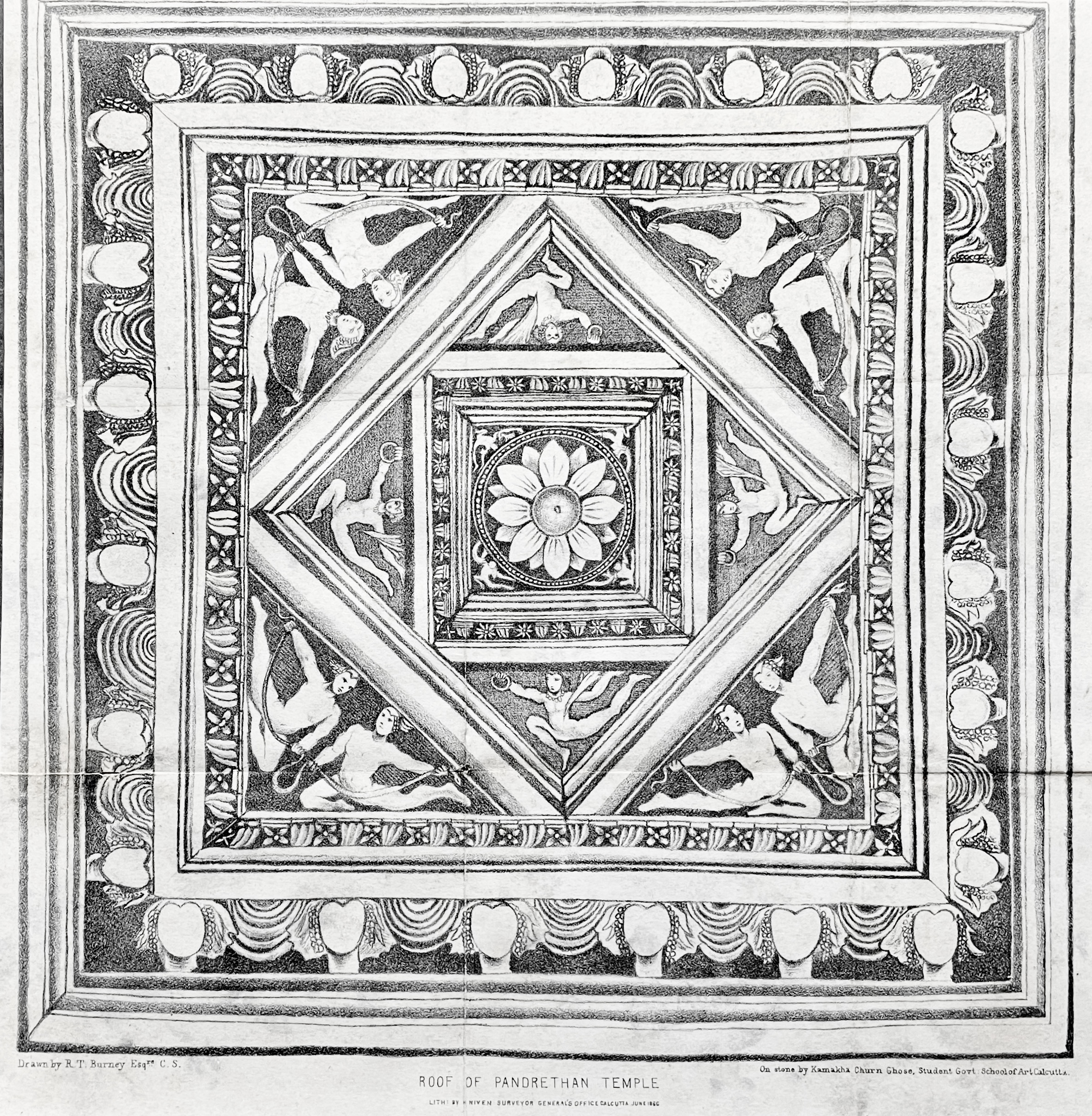
1866 drawing of the temple's ceiling

The temple is made of ashlar stone masonry, and stands atop a high platform in the middle of a tank. The temple is tri-ratha on the outside, and square on the inside. The top consists of a two-storeyed pyramidal roof. The roof of the temple is unique in being one of the few of such temples to majorly survive, providing an idea of what the now-demolished roofs of Hindu temples at Martand, Awantipora and elsewhere in Kashmir may have looked like. The pyramidal summit at the top has been lost, and the roof is now topped with a modern dome and three-orbed finial. There are four doors in four directions, with lintels supporting triangular pediments containing trefoil arches. The front facing trefoil arch contains a relief of Shiva in his Lakulisha form, while the remaining three are empty but may have had similar reliefs.

The ceiling of the temple is noted for being the best preserved of ancient Kashmiri Hindu stone temples. It is intricately carved, consisting of three overlapping squares, formed of nine stone slabs. Four triangular slabs each are arranged to form the bottom and middle squares, while the top square consists of a single square slab with a full-blown lotus relief.

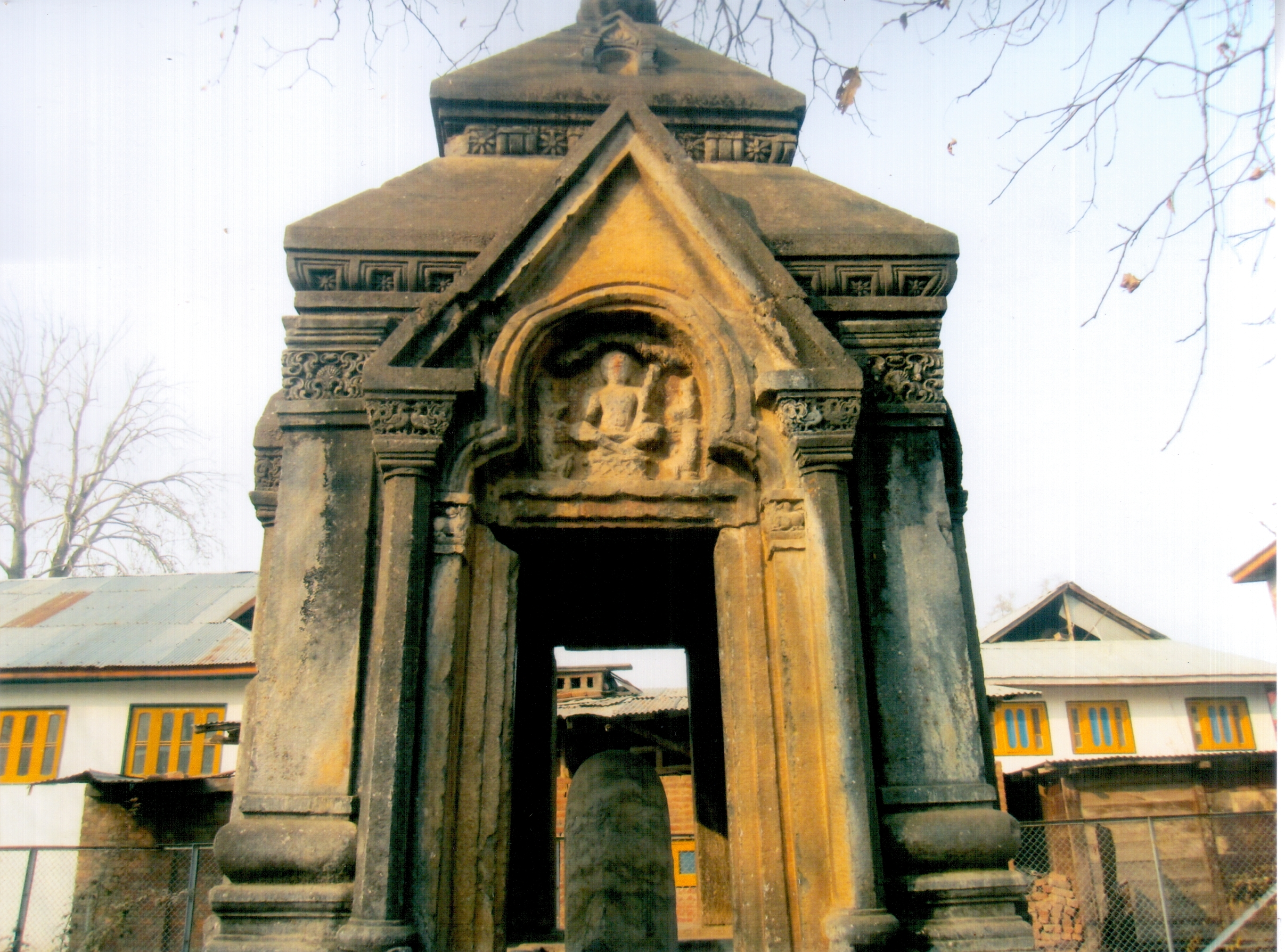
Architecturally similar, but smaller, Shiva temple at Payar with a Lakulisha relief in a trefoil arch

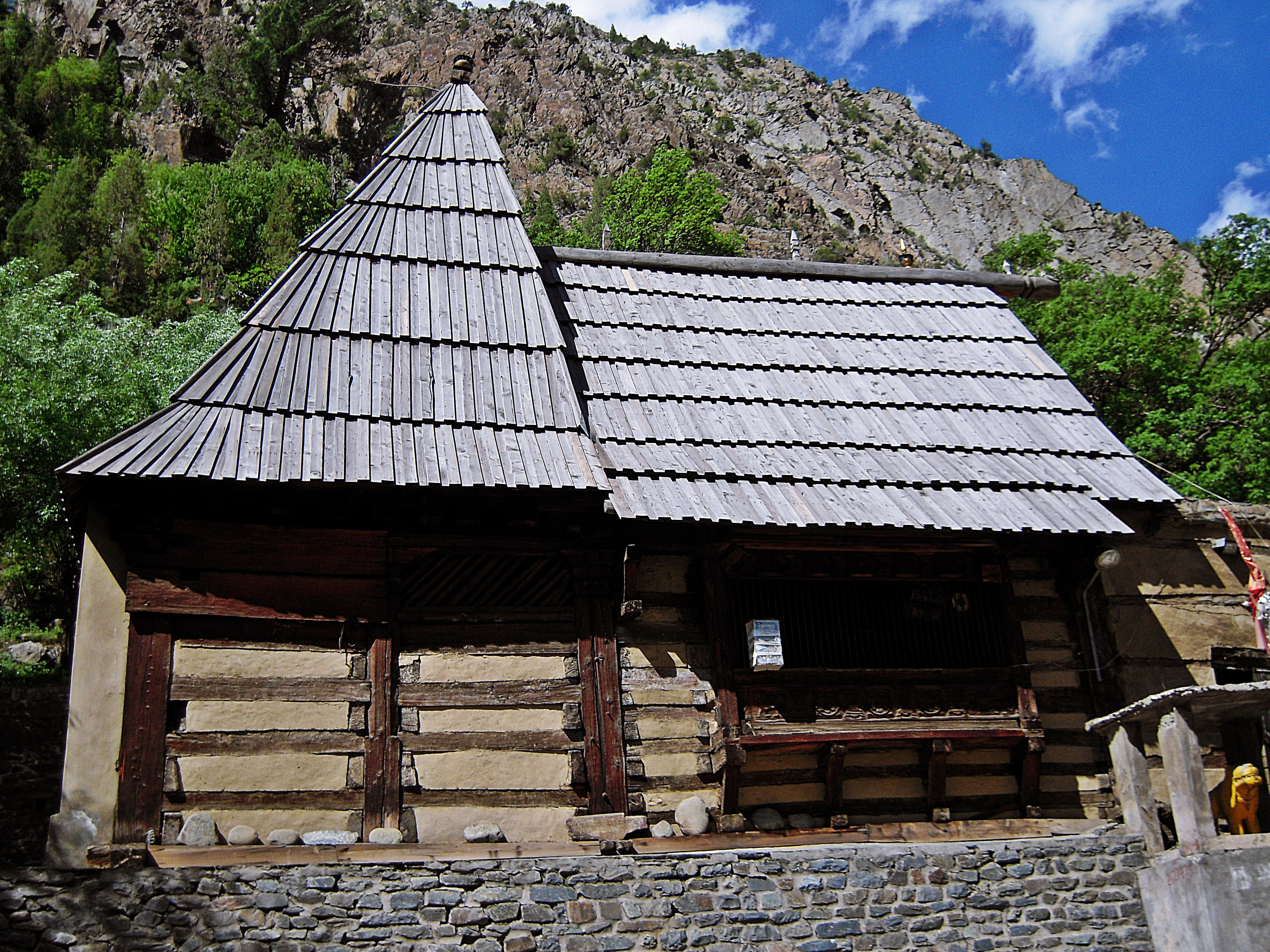
Mrikula Devi temple in Udaipur, Himachal Pradesh, contains a wooden replica of the Pandrethan temple's stone ceiling.

The sanctum likely housed a shiva lingam or image of a three- or four-headed Mahadeva originally. The current shiva-lingam was installed in the temple at a later, modern date. The temple has great resemblance to a smaller Shiva temple at Payar, near Pulwama. The Pandrethan temple may have served as inspiration for the ceiling of the Mrikula Devi temple at Udaipur, Himachal Pradesh, which is a replica of the former's stone ceiling but made using wood. The Pandrethan temple's ceiling style can also be seen replicated in wood, but without any motifs, at the Jamia Masjid in Srinagar.

== Bibliography ==
- Bilham, Roger; Bali, Bikram; Bhat, M. I.; Hough, S. E. (2010). "Historical earthquakes in Srinagar, Kashmir: Clues from the Shiva Temple at Pandrethan". Geological Society of America Special Papers. 471: 107–117. doi:10.1130/2010.2471(10). ISBN 978-0-8137-2471-3.
- Fisher, Robert E. (1989), "Stone Temples", in Pal, Pratapaditya (ed.), Art and architecture of ancient Kashmir, Marg publications, pp. 29–40, ISBN 81-85026-06-8
- Hamdani, Hakim Sameer (2021), The Syncretic Traditions of Islamic Religious Architecture of Kashmir (Early 14th–18th Century), Routledge, ISBN 978-0-367-55009-7
- Huntington, Susan L.; Huntington, John C. (2013) [1985], The Art of Ancient India: Buddhist, Hindu, Jain, Motilal Banarsidass, ISBN 978-8-120-83617-4
- Kaul, Shonaleeka (2018), The Making of Early Kashmir: Landscape and Identity in the Rajatarangini, Oxford University Press, ISBN 978-0-19-948292-4
- Kak, Ram Chandra (1933), Ancient Monuments of Kashmir, London: The India Society
- Mitra, Debala (1977), Pandrethan, Avantipur and Martand, New Delhi: Archaeological Survey of India
- Siudmak, John (2013), The Hindu-Buddhist Sculpture of Ancient Kashmir and its Influences, BRILL, ISBN 978-90-04-24315-6
- Wani, Muhammad Ashraf; Wani, Aman Ashraf (2023), The Making of Early Kashmir: Intercultural Networks and Identity Formation, Routledge, ISBN 978-1-032-15830-3
