= Igreja da Madalena =

Church in Lisbon, Lisbon District, Portugal

Coordinates: 38°42′37″N 9°08′06″W

- View of the main façade of the church.

Religion
- Affiliation: Catholic Church
- Diocese: Lisbon District
- Region: Lisboa Region
- Rite: Roman Rite

Location
- Location: Largo da Madalena 1, 1100 Lisboa, Portugal.
- Municipality: Lisbon
- Interactive map of Igreja da Madalena

Architecture
- Style: Manueline
- Groundbreaking: 1150
- Completed: 1833

Church of the Magdalene (Portuguese: Igreja da Madalena) is a church in Lisbon, Portugal. Its portal is classified as a National Monument.

== History ==
The Magdalene Church that currently exists is the result of several reconstructions. The original structure was erected in 1150 or 1164, by order of D. Afonso Henriques. In 1363, a fire completely destroyed the church, and Ferdinand I of Portugal had it rebuilt. In 1600 the church was partially destroyed by a cyclone. In 1755 the church was demolished by the 1755 Lisbon earthquake. In 1783 Queen Maria I of Portugal had to rebuild the church again. In 1833, the church underwent some changes.

The church portal, a Manueline trefoil arch that was salvaged intact following the 1755 Lisbon earthquake, was classified as a National Monument in 1910.

== Gallery ==
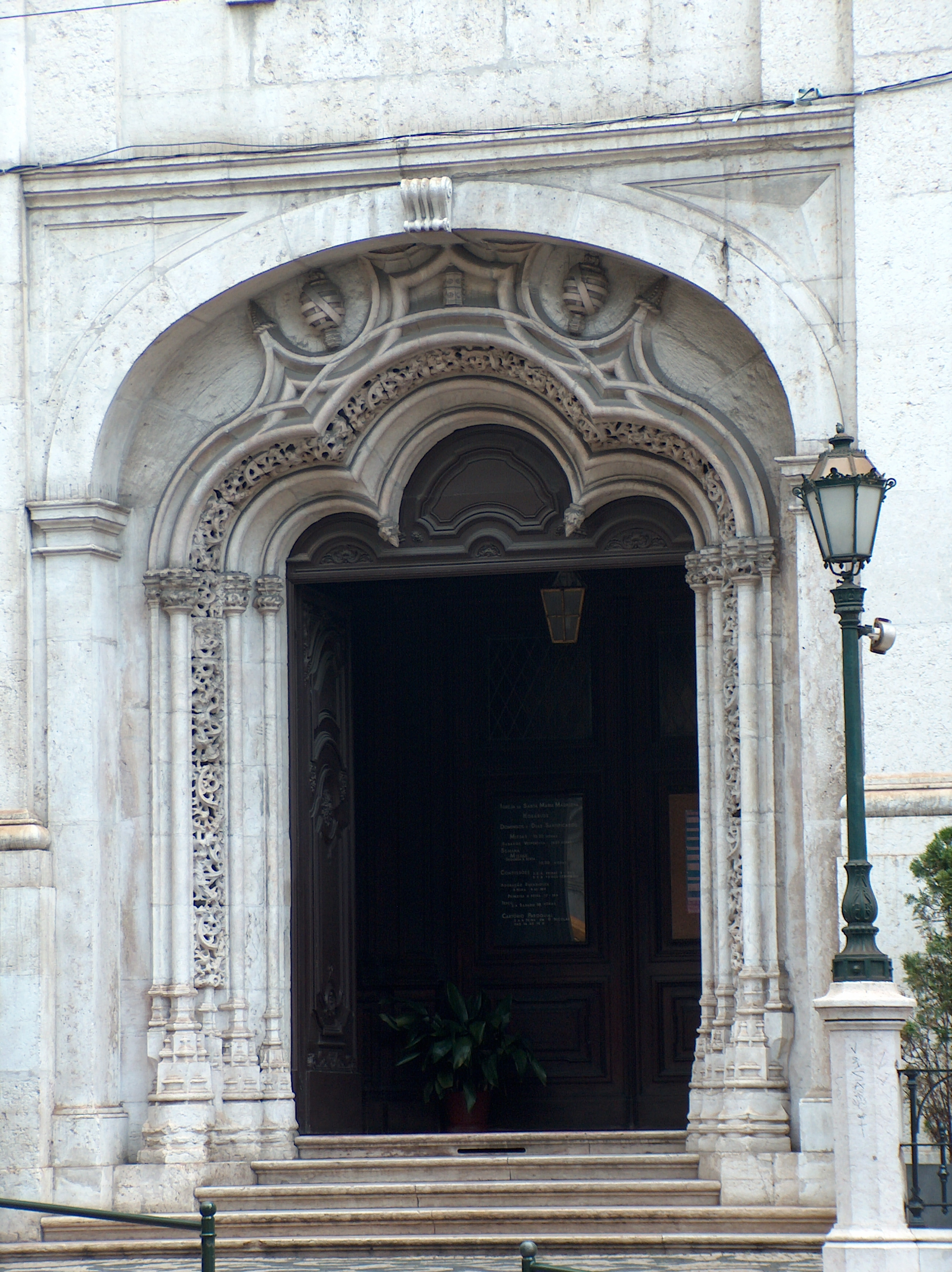

== See also ==
- Religious architecture
- History of Lisbon
