= Sugandha =

Queen of Kashmir

- Sri Sugandha Deva
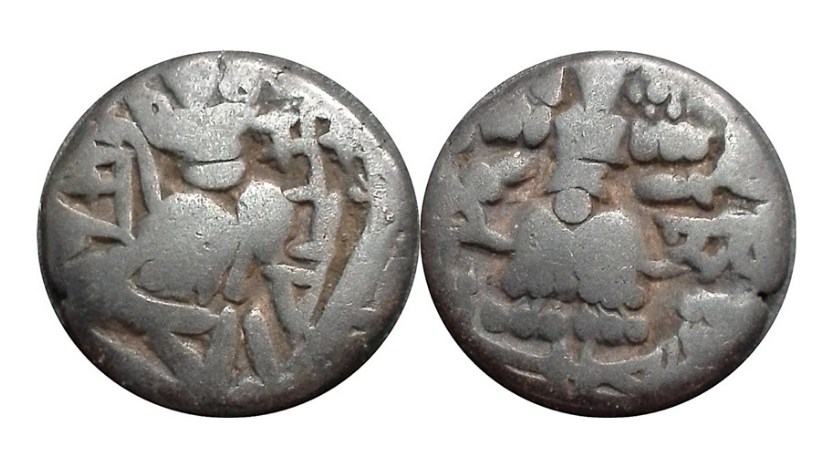
- Coinage of Queen Sugandha. 'Sri Sugandha Deva' is written in Sharada script.

Queen Regnant of Kashmir
- Reign: 904 – 906
- Predecessor: Sankata
- Successor: Partha

Queen Regent of Kashmir
- Regency: 902 – 904
- Monarch: Gopalavarman

Queen Consort of Kashmir
- Tenure: 883 – 902
- Monarch: Sankaravarman
- Died: 914 CE; Nispalaka Vihara
- Spouse: Sankaravarman
- Issue: Gopalavarman
- House: Utpala dynasty
- Father: Svamiraja
- Religion: Shaivism

Sugandha (fl. 883 – 914) was the fifth ruler of Kashmir in the northern Indian subcontinent during the 10th century.

She was the Queen Consort of Kashmir from 885 to 902 by marriage to Sankaravarman, the King of Kashmir. She served as Queen Regent of Kashmir during the minority of her son king Gopalavarman between 902 and 904. She was declared monarch in her own right in 904 as Sri Sugandha Deva, Queen of Kashmir, when all successors to the throne has died. She was dethroned by the Tantrins in 906 and they installed Partha as monarch. Sugandha continued to claim the throne of Kashmir and retreated to live in Haskapura (present-day Ushkur, Baramulla). In 914 she went to war against Partha and the Tantrins, but was imprisoned and later killed in a Buddhist monastery called Nispalaka Vihara.

== Queen consort ==
Sugandha was the daughter of Svamiraja, the king of a kingdom near Kashmir. Sugandha was married to Sankaravarman, who reigned as King of Kashmir from 885 CE until 902 CE. He had at-least three other wives, including one Surendravati, but Sugangha acted as his queen consort.

Sankaravarman died in 902 of a stray-arrow at Urusha (present-day Hazara, Pakistan), whilst returning from a not-so-successful conquest, where Sugandha had also accompanied him. Following his death, he was succeeded by his son, Gopalavarman. While some of Sankaravarman's queens and servants died by Sati, the Dowager Queen Sugandha refused it in order to act as Queen Mother and regent for Gopalavarman. After Sankaravarman's last rites had finished, Gopalavarman was crowned the King of Kashmir.

== Reign as regent ==
Although Sugandha was good at managing the affairs of the kingdom, she took pleasure in bodily indulgences. Various historians accuse her of being intimate to her treasury minister Prabhakaradeva, who they describe as her paramour. Prabhakaradeva used to exercise the real powers of the King. He engaged in prolonged theft of state-treasures and was finally probed by Gopalavarman. In due course, Prabhakaradeva employed a relative Ramadeva to assassinate the king by practice of witchcraft. Gopalavarman died of a fever and Ramadeva died by suicide, after his conspiracy became public knowledge.

After Gopalavarman's death, his brother Sankata became King, but he died mysteriously after ten days. After Sankaravarman's lineage died out, Kashmir fell into a political turmoil. Courtiers started plotting a coup and public figures called a Maha-Panchayat to choose the kingdom's ruler. As Sugandha was quite popular among the people, she was proclaimed the sovereign of Kashmir.

== Reign as monarch ==
In 904 CE, Sugandha assumed royal power and ruled Kashmir in her own right. Some historians believe that she did it apparently with an intention of securing it for her grandson — the yet-unborn child of Jayalakshmi. She ruled Kashmir for two years (r. 904 – 906).

She hoped that she would be succeeded by her unborn grandson, the son of Gopalavarman, but her daughter-in-law Jayalakshmi's pregnancy resulted in a stillbirth. Sugandha, now in despair, wished that she be succeeded by one of her blood-relatives, Nirjitavarman, a grandson of Suravarman and a half-brother of Avantivarman, nicknamed "Pangu" (lame).

She nominated Pangu as the successor to the throne and in doing this, she had to seek the advice and permission of her ministers. Sugandha's choice was met with considerable resistance from the ministers as well as the Tantrins, on grounds of Nirjitavarman's lameness. Sugandha was dethroned by the Tantrins and they installed Nirjitavarman's ten-year-old son Partha as monarch instead.

== Later life ==
Following her dethronement in 906 CE, Sugandha retreated to live in Haskapura (present-day Ushkur, Baramulla), and continued to claim the throne of Kashmir.

In 914, after eight years of exile in Haskapura, Sugandha was persuaded by the Ekangas, Royal bodyguards and other factions loyal to her, to wage a war against Partha and the Tantrins. The fierce battle occurred in the suburbs of Srinagar in April 914 CE.

She was defeated and captured by the Tantrins. Sugandha was imprisoned and later killed in a Buddhist monastery called Nispalaka Vihara. Kalhana observes: "Strange are the ways of fate, ever falling and rising".

== Aftermath ==
In early medieval Kashmir, the rule of the Utpala dynasty in the Vale of Kashmir was dominated by the rivalry of two military factions, the Tantrins and the Ekangas. Their vying led to the installment of new monarchs and dethronement of others. Tantrins were a strong military class organisation. Tantrin foot-soldiers had formed a confederacy and were strong enough to punish or to favour the rulers of the kingdom. Ekangas are said to have been Royal bodyguards, who influenced the affairs of the court and the state. After Sugandha was defeated in 914 CE, and none of the succeeding rulers was able to assert their supremacy over the Tantrins.

Finally, feudal landowners, known as damaras, were called put an end to the power struggle. They successfully destroyed the power of the Tantrins, after which the rulers of Kashmir were faced with the new problems of curbing the power of the landowners, as is evident from political events during the rule of Queen Didda.

== Legacy ==
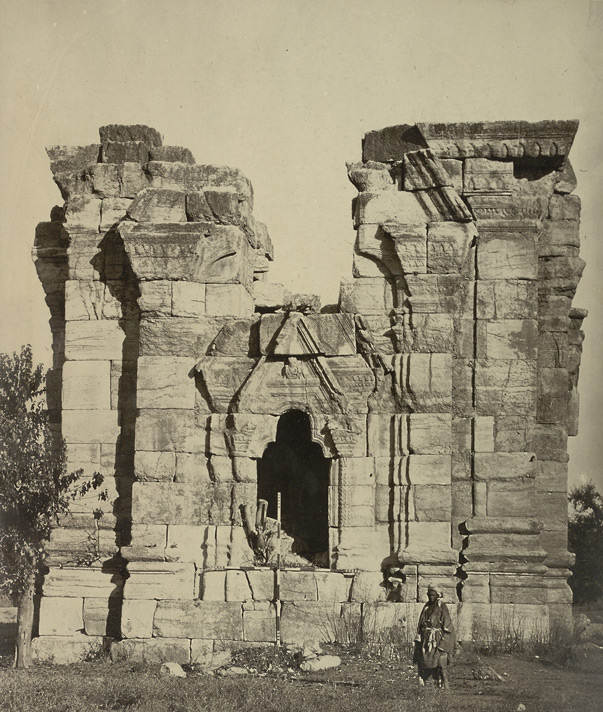
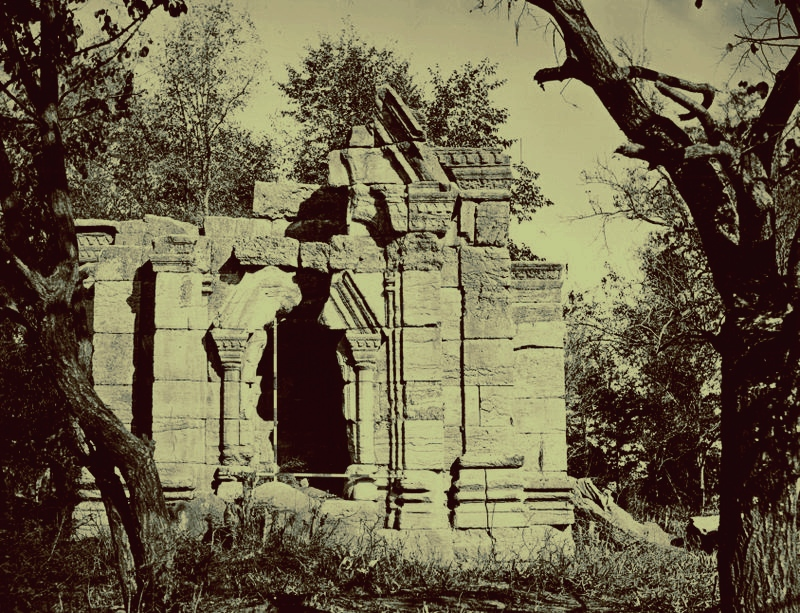
Remains of Sankara Gauresa (left) and Sugandesha Temple (right), at present-day Pattan, Kashmir

Some historians call her reign as the "golden age" of Kashmir. Historian Prem Nath Bazaz states that "She was loved by the people, trusted by the courtiers, and admired by the army".

Sugandha's reign constitutes the first concrete and historically verifiable reign of a female sovereign in Kashmir's history and ruled at the behest of her subjects.

During her reign, Sugandha built the towns of Sugandhapura and Gopalapura, the Vishnu temple Gopalakesava, and the monastery of Gopalamatha. She also built the Sugandesha Temple, located at Pattan, which has a square sanctum with a portico in front and a peristyle around.

Sankaravarman, along with Sugandha, dedicated two temples to Mahadeva, namely Sankara Gauresa and Sugandhesvara at the new capital of Sankarapura. These two stately temples are still standing today at modern-day Pattan.

Sugandha's coinage is an important corroborative evidence of her power and refers to her by the masculine epithet, Sri Sugandha Deva. Ardochsho (Goddess Lakshmi) is seen seated in Lalitasana in most of the coins and Sharda script is distinctly visible.

== See also ==
- Queen Didda
- Kota Rani
- Rajatarangini
