= Ratnākara =

9th-century Sanskrit poet

Ratnākara (fl. 9th century CE) was a Sanskrit poet in premodern India. His magnum opus, the Haravijaya, containing 4,351 verses, is the longest extant mahākāvya. His work has been praised in many Sanskrit anthologies and works on rhetorics.

== Life ==
Very little is known about Ratnākara's life. He is referred to as a dependent of Bālabṛhaspati—generally assumed to be an epithet of Cippaṭajayāpīḍa—in the colophons of the Haravijaya's cantos. In the praśasti of the Haravijaya he speaks of himself as the son of Amṛtabhānu, a descendant of Durgadatta from Gangāhrada in the Himalayas. Kalhaṇa's Rājataraṅgiṇī lists him as one of the poets active at the court of Avantivarman (r. 855–883 CE).

== Works ==
=== Haravijaya ===
The Haravijaya, described as Ratnākara's magnum opus, is the longest extant Sanskrit mahākāvya, containing a total of 4,351 verses in fifty sargas (cantos). The poem narrates Śiva's victory over Andhaka and also describes Śiva's iconographic features and gives an exposition of Śaiva philosophy. Peter Pasedach lists three commentaries on the poem: Viṣamapadoddyotā by Alaka, Laghupañcikā by Ratnakaṇṭha, and Haravijayasāravivaraṇa by Utpala. An edition of the work was published in 1890, prepared by Pandit Durgaprasad and Kasinath Pandurang Parab for the Kāvyamālā series. Another edition of the text was prepared by Dr. Goparaju Rama for the Ganganatha Jha Kendriya Sanskrit Vidyapitha Text Series and published in two volumes from 1982.

- Pandit Durgaprasad; Kasinath Pandurang Parab, eds. (1982) [1st pub. 1890 from Nirnaya Sagar Press]. The Haravijaya of Rājānaka Ratnākara with the Commentary of Rājānaka Alaka. Chaukhamba Sanskrit Sansthan.
- Goparaju Rama, ed. (1982). Haravijayam by Rājānaka Ratnākara. Rashtriya Sanskrit Sansthan.

=== Vakroktipañcāśikā ===
savyālambanam [savyālaṃ vanam] etad
adya bhavato niḥsneha muñcāmy aham
savyālaṃ vijahīhi sundari vanaṃ niḥsnehatā nāsti me
maivaṃ vakṣyasi kiṃ vanaṃ nanu jalaṃ mūrdhnā mayaivohyate
vakroktyeti himādrijām avacasaṃ kurvan haraḥ pātu vaḥ

As of now, you heartless man, I give up being your left half! (... I give up the snake-filled forest!)
Go ahead: give up the snake-filled forest, beautiful. I'm not heartless.
What forest? Don't speak like that! (No! Are you carrying water?)
Of course I carry water on my head.
May Śiva –
rendering the Daughter of the Snowy Mountain speechless by means of distortive talk (vakrokti) –
protect you.

— Vakroktipañcāśikā 1, translated by Yigal Bronner and Lawrence McCrea

The Vakroktipañcāśikā, possibly Ratnākara's only other preserved work, contains fifty verses of dialogue between Śiva and Pārvatī, employing the device of vakrokti ("verbal distortion"); Yigal Bronner and Lawrence McCrea argue that Ratnākara may have invented this poetic device. Vallabhadeva has commented upon the work. An edition of the Vakroktipañcāśikā, by Durgaprasad and Parab, including Vallabhadeva's commentary, was published in Number 1 of the Kāvyamālā Anthology series in 1886.

- Pandit Durgaprasad; Kasinath Pandurang Parab, eds. (1988) [1st pub. 1886 from Nirnaya Sagar Press]. Ratnākaraviracitā Vakroktipañcāśikā (Saṭīkā). Kāvyamālā Anthology. Vol. 1. Chaukhamba Bharati Academy. pp. 101–114.

=== Other works ===
The Ratnākarapurāṇa, attributed to Ratnākara, is a now-lost chronicle of the kings of Kashmir, covering two "gaps" in Kalhaṇa's Rājataraṅginī. The Dhvanigāthāpañcikā, dealing with Prakrit verses in Ānandavardhana's Dhvanyāloka, is sometimes attributed to Ratnākara. The identity of this work's author with the author of Haravijaya is "practically impossible", as it appears to be an abridged version of the relevant sections of the Locana of Abhinavagupta, who lived after the author of the Haravijaya.

== Legacy ==
Ratnākara's work has been praised in many Sanskrit anthologies and works on rhetorics. The Haravijaya is also held in high esteem by modern Indian Sanskrit scholars. Rājaśekhara complimented Ratnākara with the following verse:

mā sma santi hi catvāraḥ prāyo ratnākarā ime
itīva sa kṛto dhātrā kavī ratnākaro ’paraḥ

Thinking the four oceans were not enough,
the creator
made another ocean,
the poet Ratnākara.

— Sūktimuktāvalī 4.77, translated by David Smith
