= Trefoil arch =

Arch incorporating the outline of a trefoil

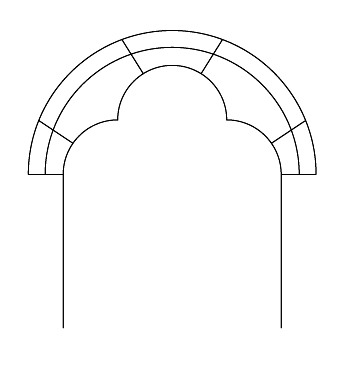
The trefoil arch

A trefoil arch, or three-foiled cusped arch (occasionally trilobite arch, no connection to an actual trilobite), is an arch incorporating the shape or outline of a trefoil – three overlapping circles. It has been widely used for its symbolic significance in Christian architecture. Trefoil arches are common in Gothic architecture for portals and decoration. Trefoil or "trilobed" arches are also a characteristic feature of decorated portals in late Fatimid architecture and Mamluk architecture in Egypt, from approximately the 12th to 16th centuries.

Trefoil arches were the most prominent feature of medieval Kashmiri temple architecture. The combination of trefoil arches with triangular pediments was unique to Kashmir between the 7th and 13th centuries.

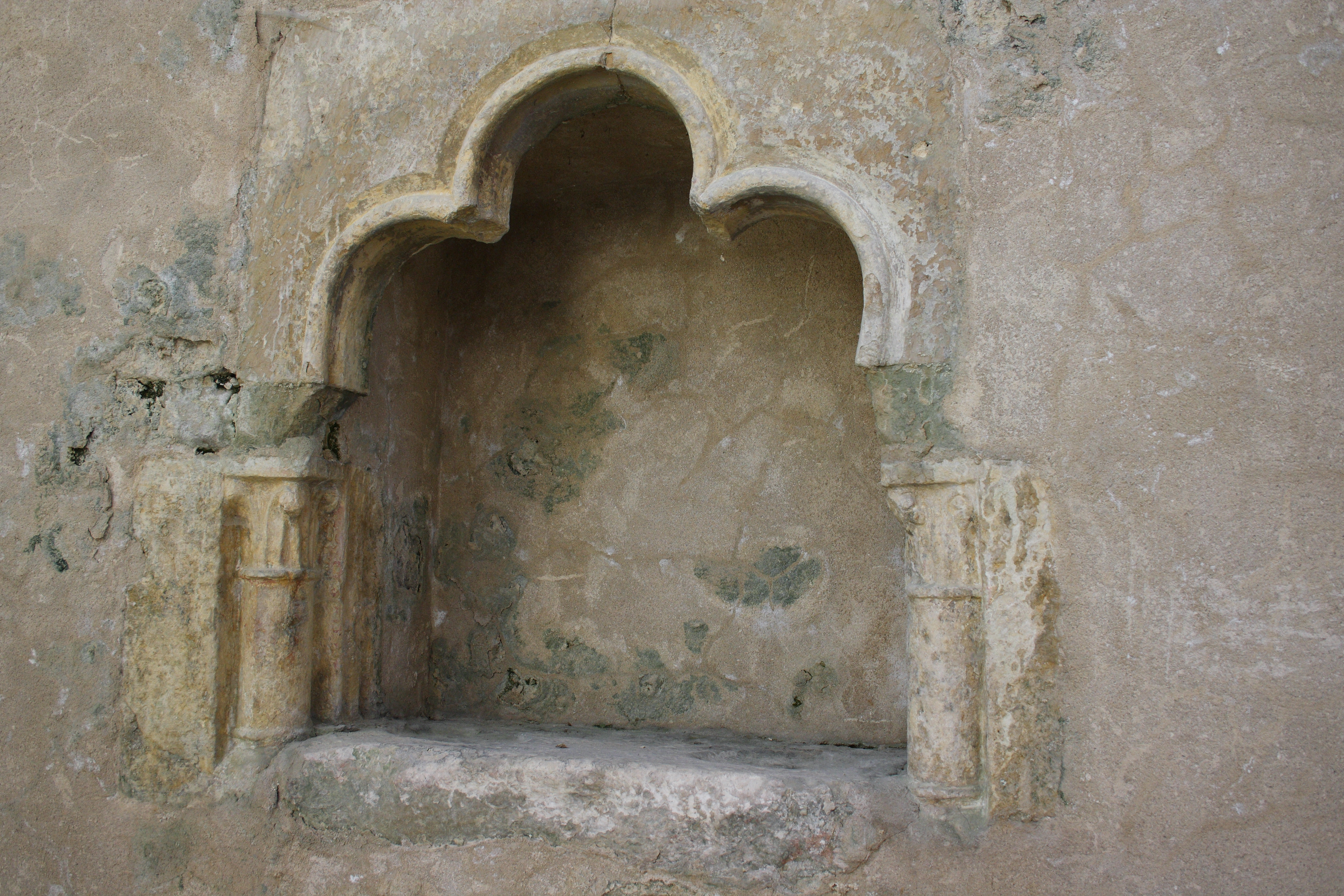
Trefoil arch in the choir of the parish Church of Saint-Eliphe (13th century), Rampillon, Seine-et-Marne (Ile-de-France)

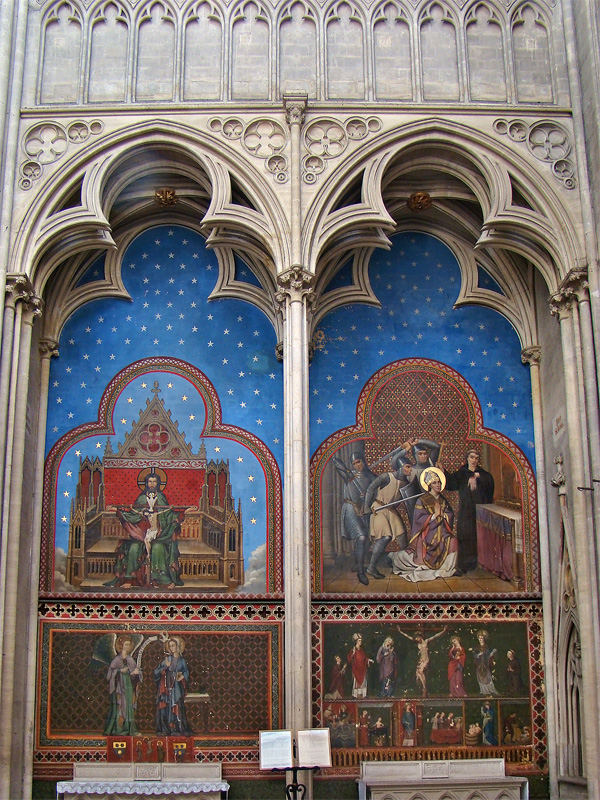
Trefoil arches at the Bayeux Cathedral (11th century), Calvados, Normandy, France

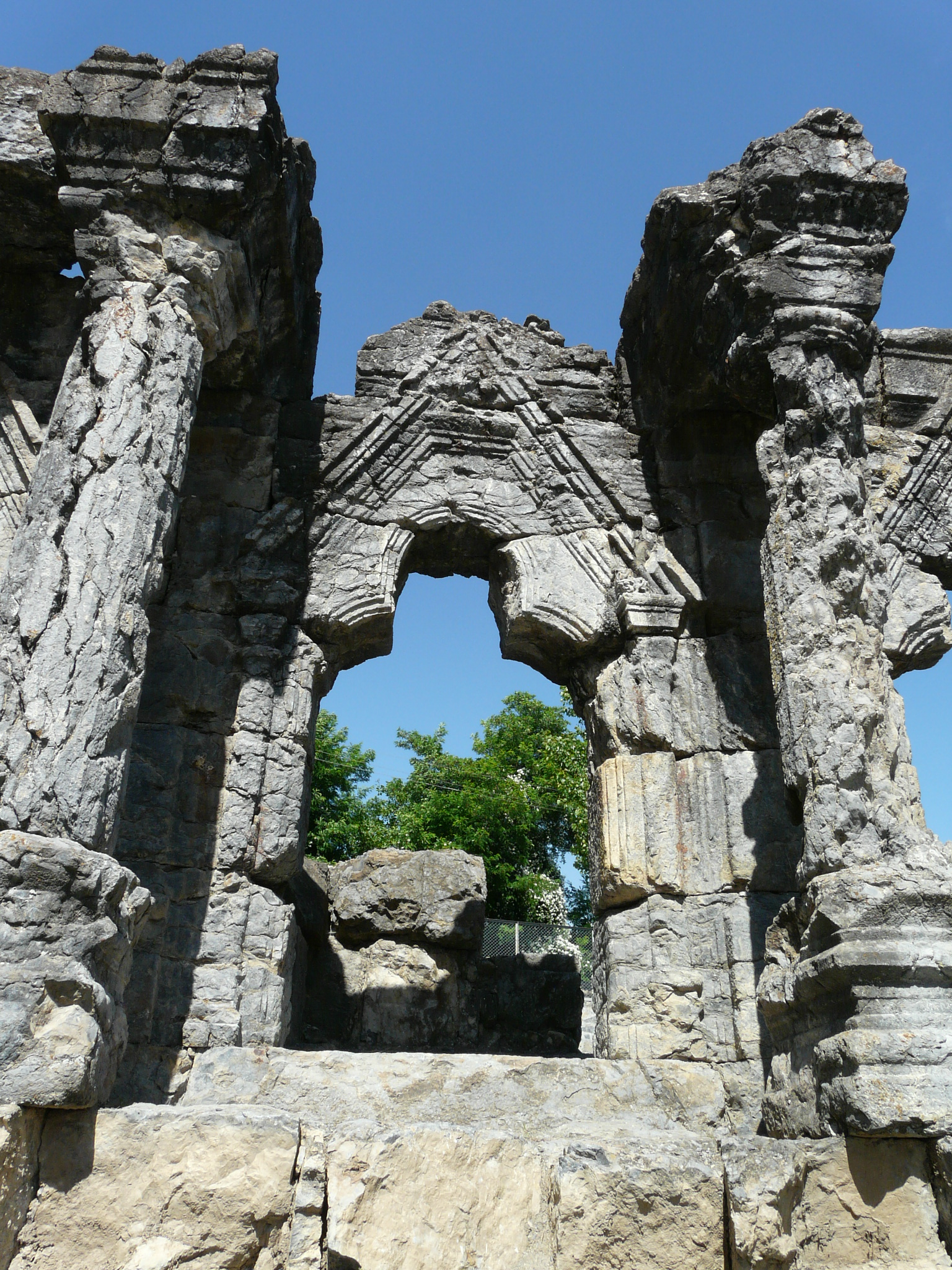
Trefoil arch at the Martand Sun Temple (8th century), Anantnag, Kashmir

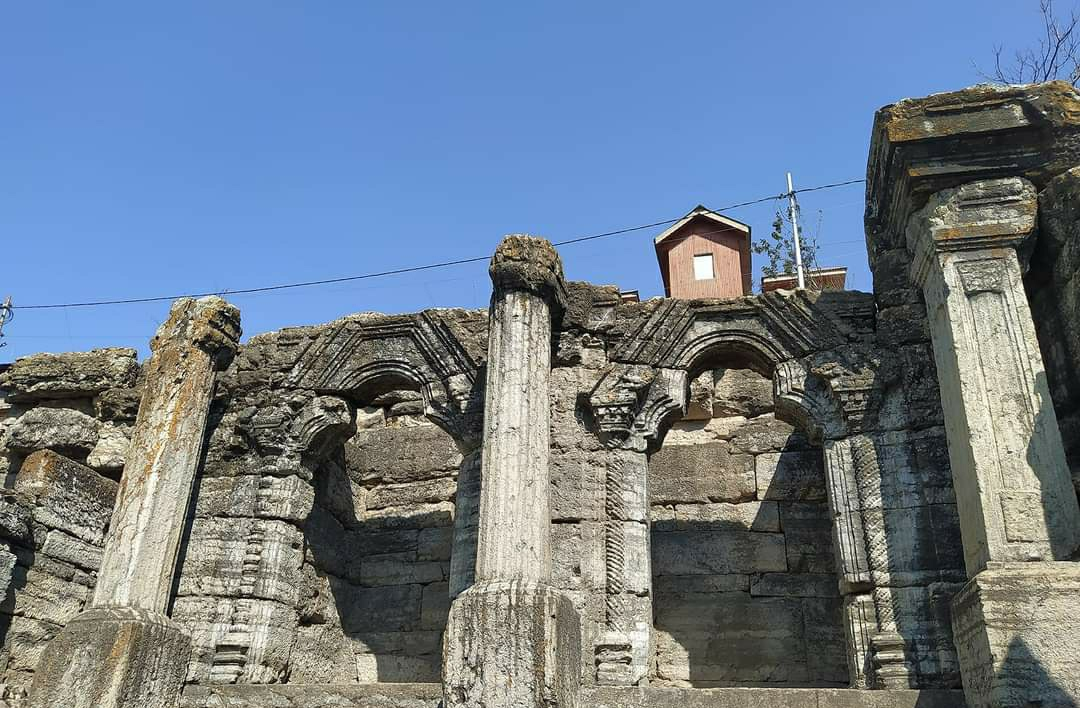
Trefoil arches at the Avantiswami Temple (9th century), Awantipora, Pulwama district, Kashmir

== See also ==
- Multifoil arch
