= Avantiswami Temple =

Ancient temple ruins in Awantipora, India

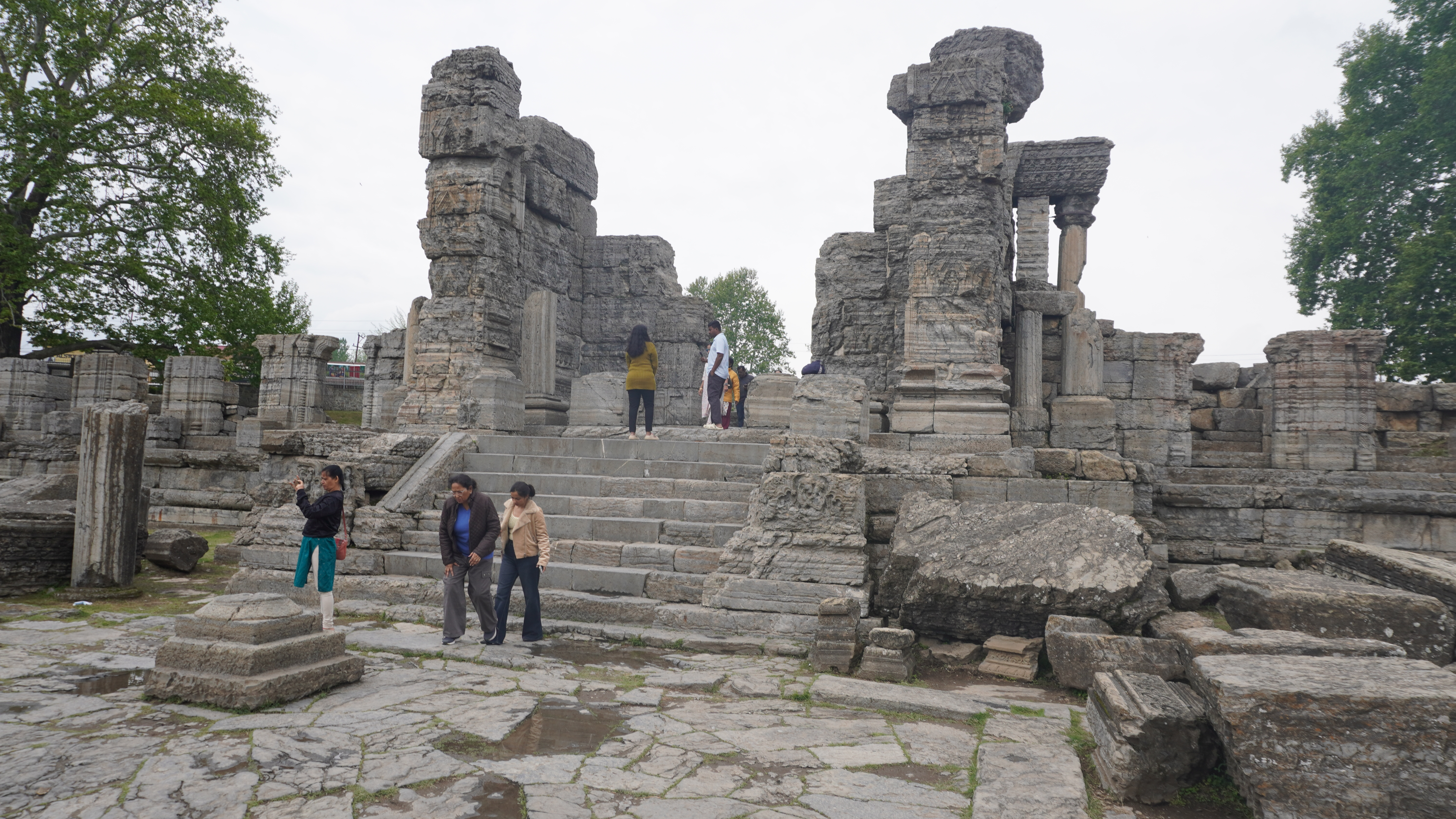
- Remains of Avantiswami Temple in Pulwama district (J&K)

- Location within Jammu & Kashmir, India Avantiswami Temple (India)

Religion
- Affiliation: Hinduism
- District: Pulwama
- Deity: Shiva; Vishnu
- Governing body: Indian Archaeological Survey

Location
- Location: Awantipora, Pulwama district, Jammu and Kashmir
- State: Jammu and Kashmir
- Country: India
- Coordinates: 33.9232602°N 75.012846°E

Architecture
- Type: Medieval Hindu
- Founder: Avantivarman
- Established: 9th century CE

The Avantiswami Temple is a ruined Hindu temple complex on the banks of the Jhelum River, approximately 16 km northeast of Pulwama town, in Awantipora, Pulwama district in Jammu and Kashmir, India. This site originally comprised two temples, one dedicated to Shiva and the other to Vishnu, built during the reign of King Avantivarman of the Utpala dynasty in the 9th century CE. Today, the ruins are protected by the Archaeological Survey of India. Locals call the temple Pandav Lari, meaning "house of the Pandavas".

== History ==
The temple was built by King Avantivarman in the year 853–855 CE. Originally known as Viswasara, the ancient town was also a capital city. Avantivarman was also the founder of Avantipur and of the Utpala dynasty in the 9th century CE. He built many Hindu temples in Kashmir during his reign, which were largely destroyed due to Muslim conquests. During the reign of Avantivarman, the region prospered. The Avantiswami Temple is an example of the stone temple architecture of Kashmir during that era.

Prior to the Muslim conquests, Kashmir was a center of Shaivism and Hindu philosophy, and a seat of Sanskrit learning and literature. By the 14th century, Kashmir had come under Muslim rule, and most of its early temples were deserted or sacked by the early 15th century. Two temples here are attributed to him: the Avantiswami Temple dedicated to Vishnu and the Avantishwara Temple dedicated to Shiva. The Avantiswami is smaller, but similar in planning to the earlier Martand Sun Temple.

== Gallery ==
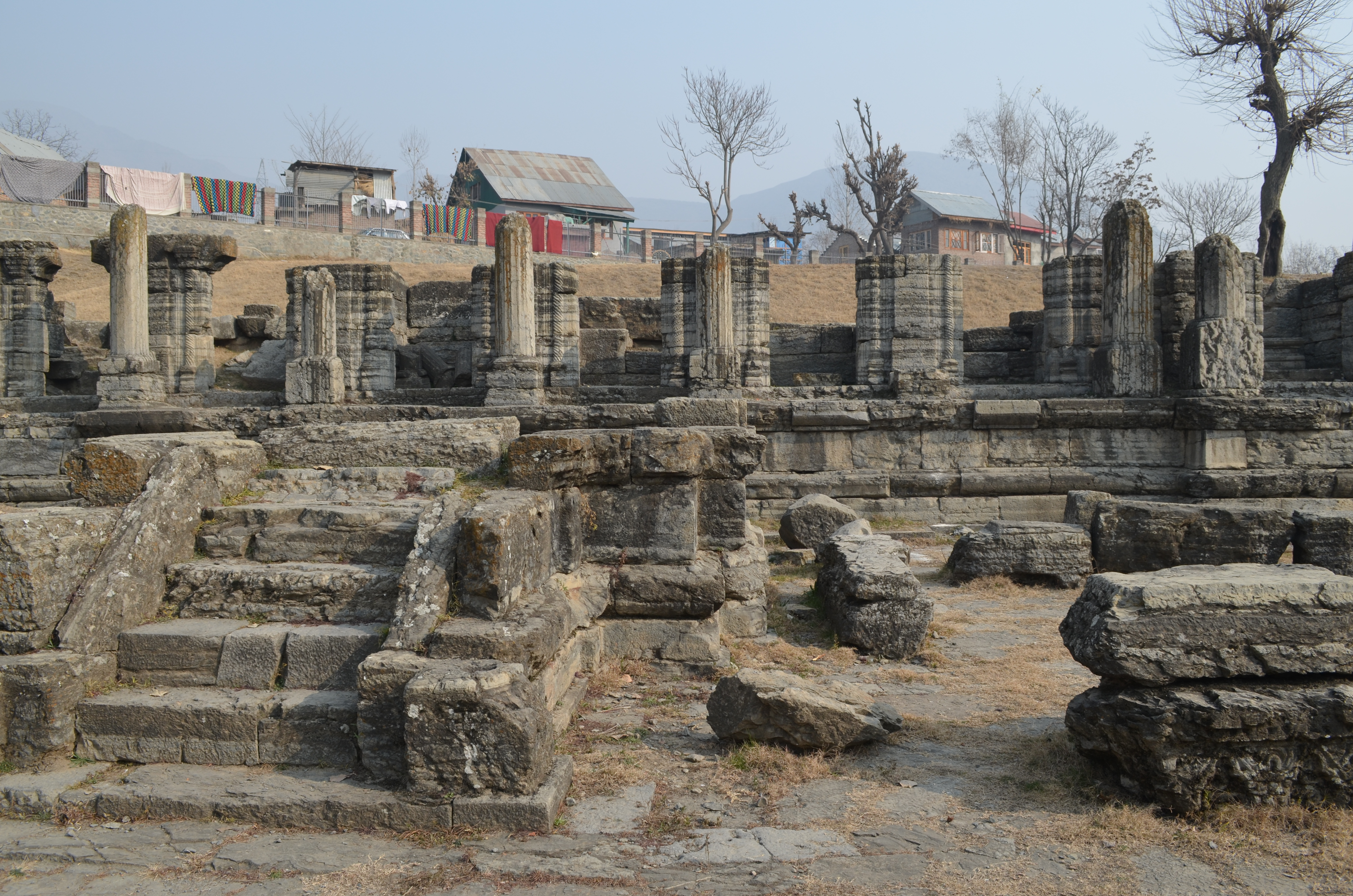

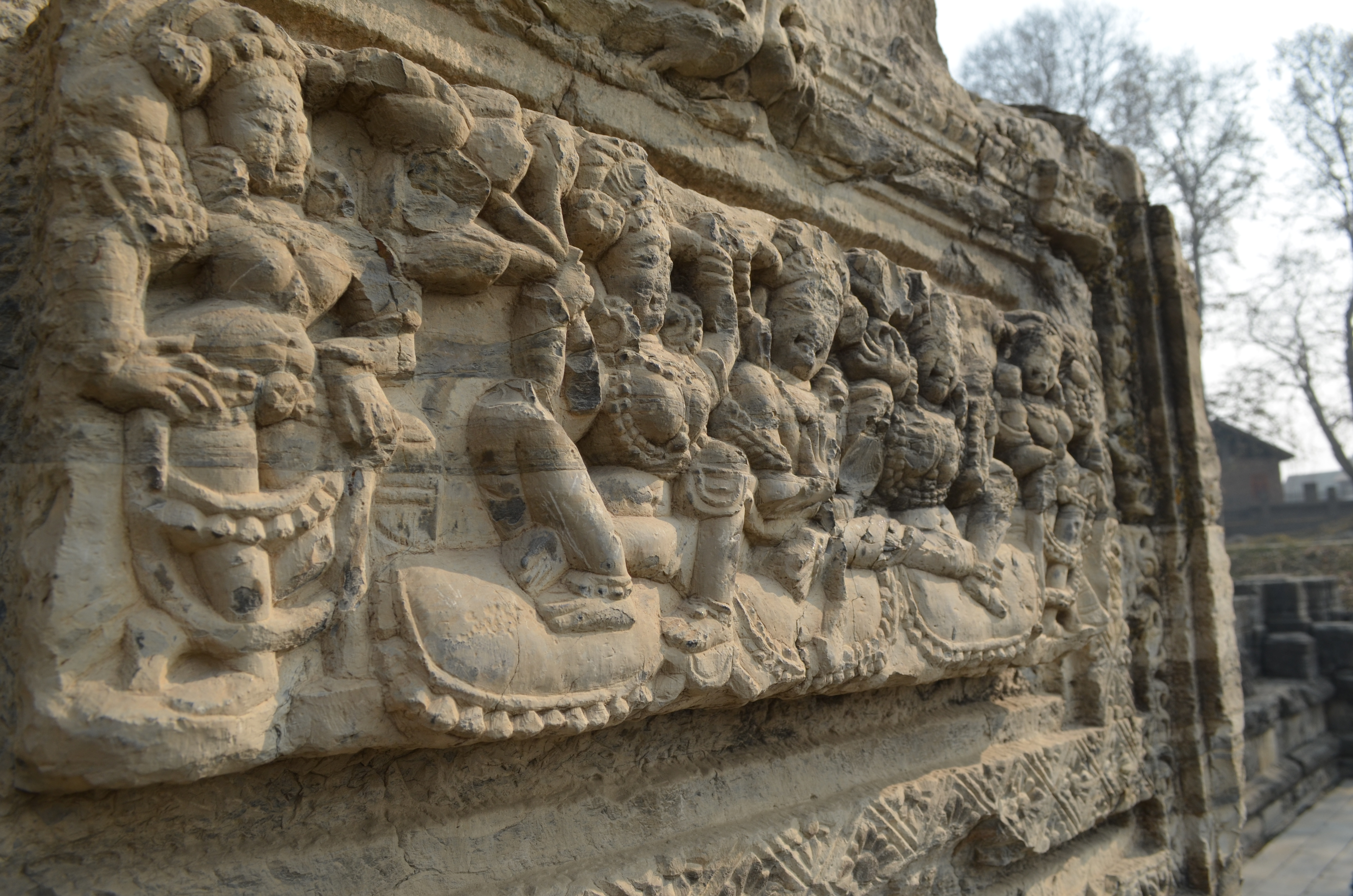

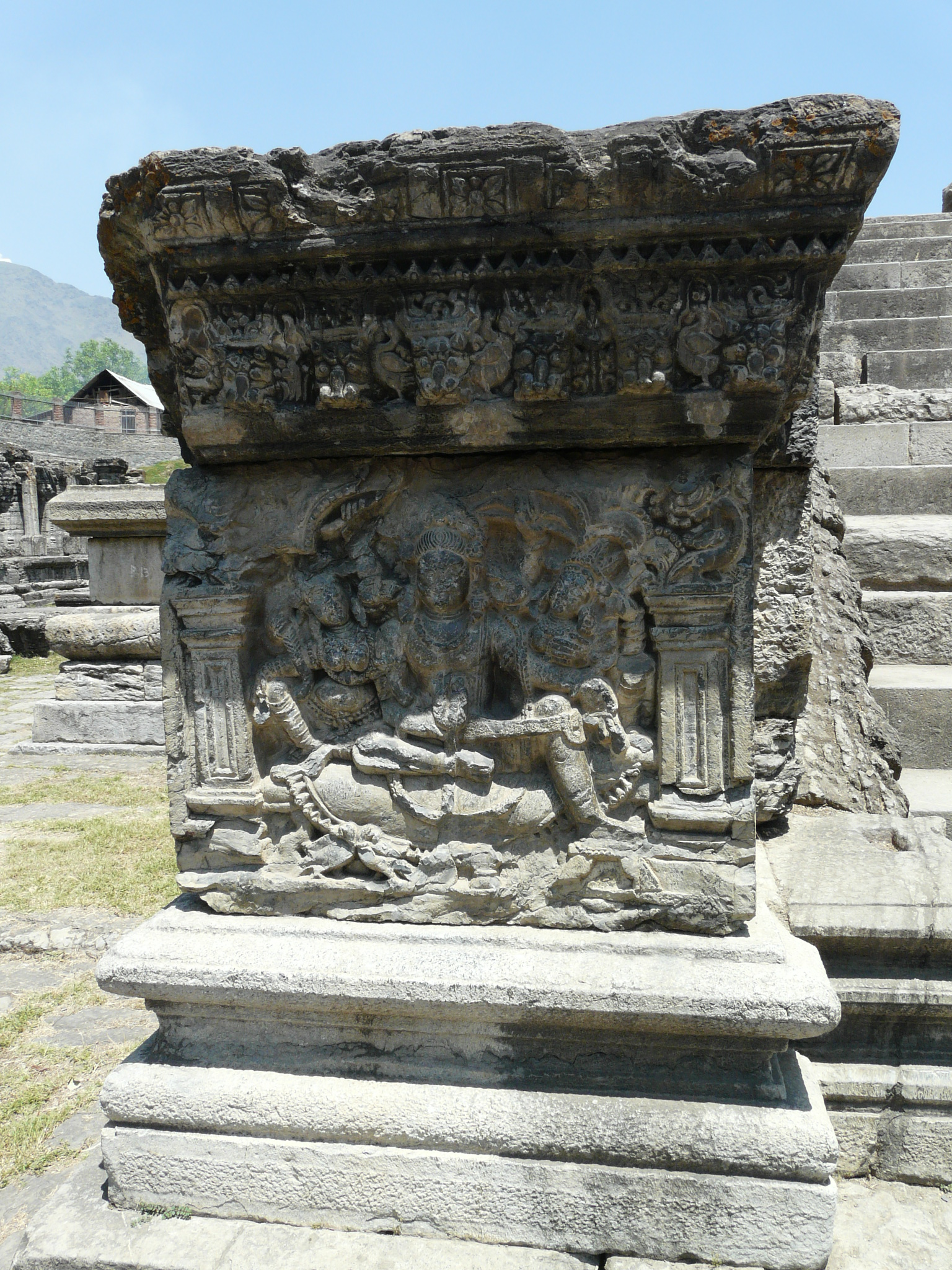

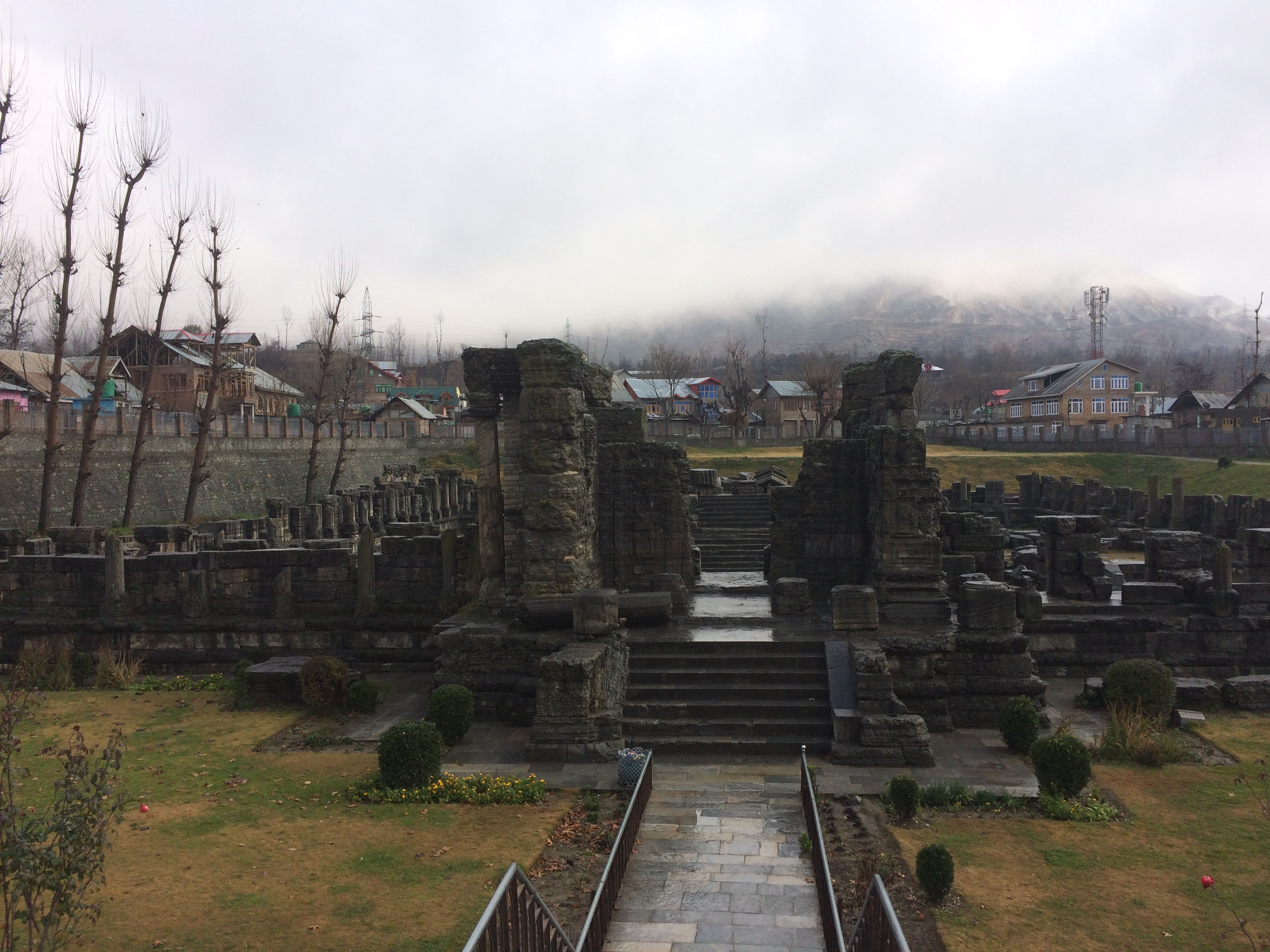

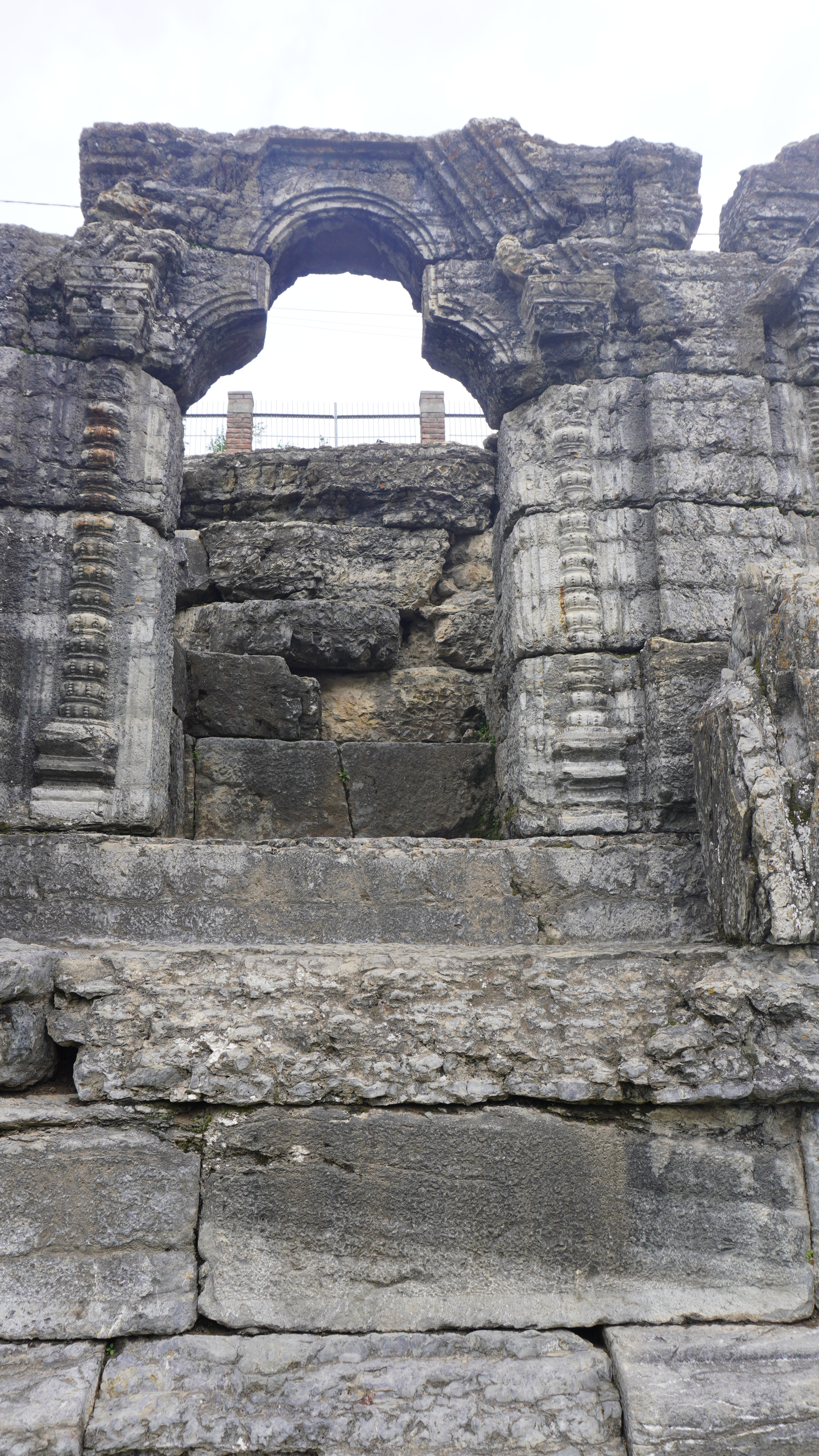

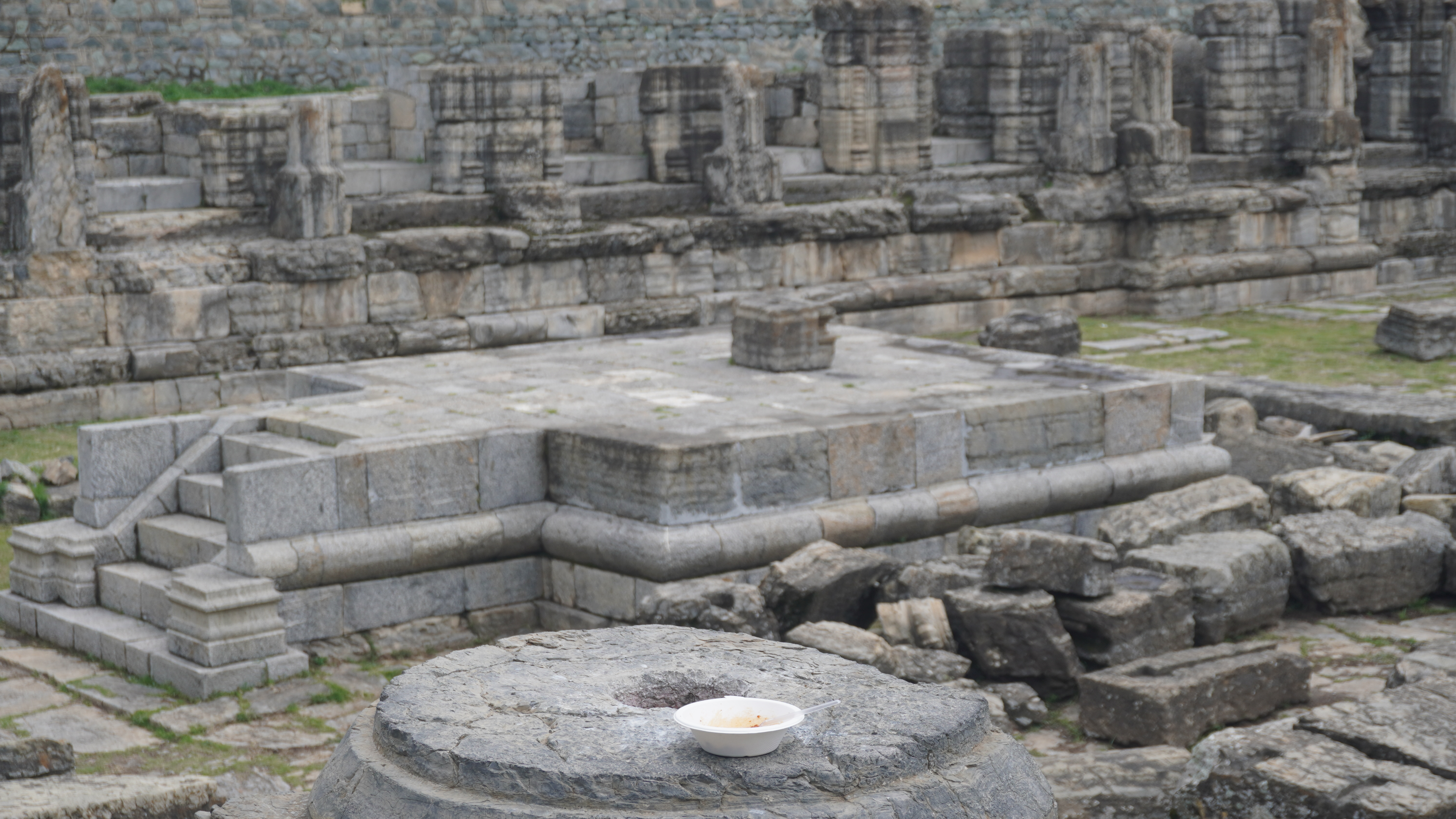

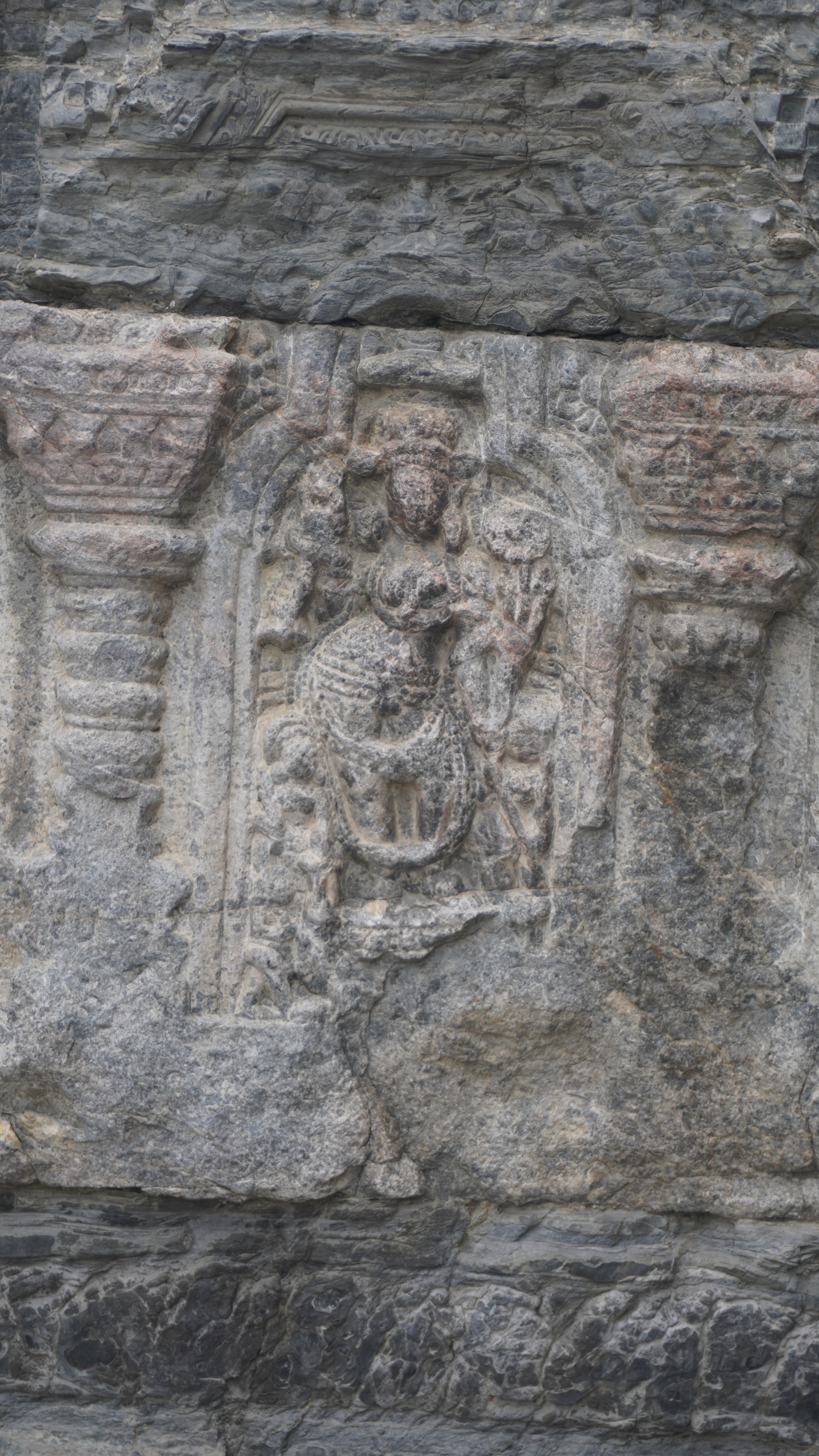

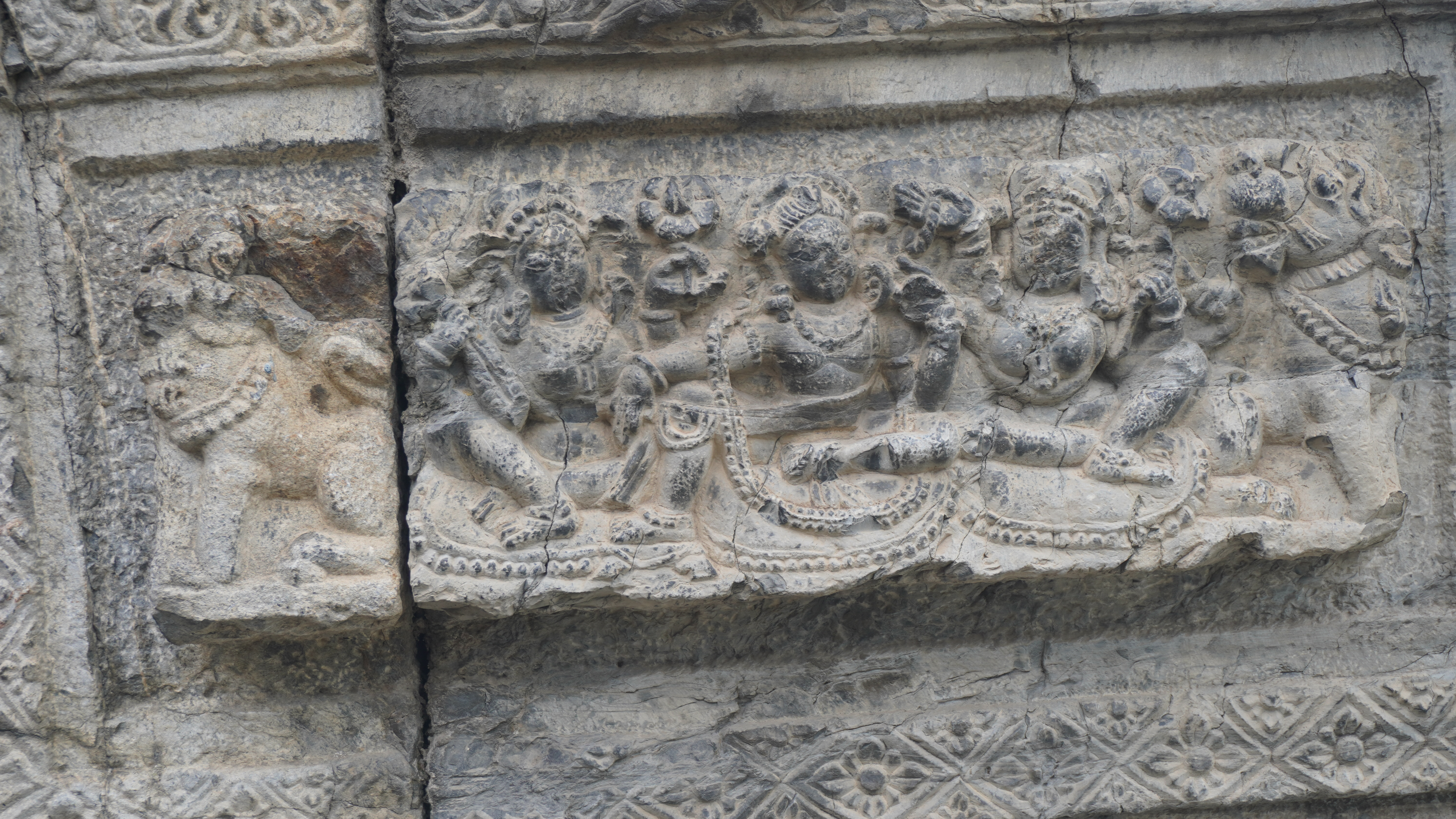

== See also ==
- Martand Sun Temple
- Shankaragaurishvara Temple
- Vishnu Devi
- Awantipora
- Kheer Bhawani
