= Sankaravarman =

King of Kashmir from 885 to 902

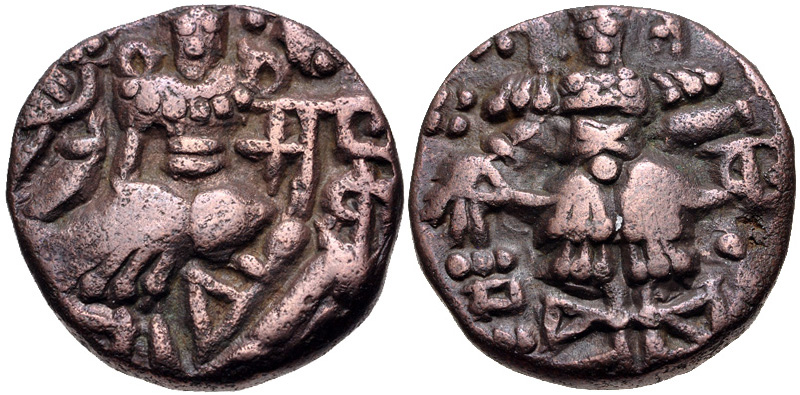
- Coinage of King Sankaravarman, Dupatalas (Kashmir) Circa 883–902 CE

King of Kashmir
- Reign: 885 – 2/3 February 902
- Predecessor: Avantivarman
- Successor: Gopalavarman
- Died: 2/3 February 902; Urasa
- Spouse: Sugandha Devi
- Issue: Gopalavarman
- House: Utpala dynasty
- Father: Avantivarman
- Religion: Shaivism

Sankaravarman was a ruler of the Utpala dynasty, a Kashmiri dynasty, which ruled over the Kashmir region of northern India from 8th to 10th century CE. The kingdom was established by Avantivarman, who ended the rule of Karkota dynasty in 855 CE.

Avantivarman died in 883 A.D. His death was followed by a civil war among several descendants of Utpala for the throne. Ultimately, the minister Ratnavardhana secured the throne for Shankaravarman, the son of Avantivarman. Shankaravarman's reign (885-902 A.D.) is memorable for his spirited foreign policy.

== Accession and early rule ==
The death of Avantivarman led to a power struggle, His son and Successor Sankaravarman, had at first to contend for the throne with his cousin Sukhavarman, who had been set up as Yuvaraja, as well as with other rivals. When the civil war was successfully ended, Sankaravarman, according to the Chronicler, started on a round of foreign expeditions. Kalhana, with poetic magniloquence, describes these as " reviving the tradition of the conquest of the world," such as he attributes to earlier Kasmir heroes.

== Military ==
The Sankaravarman's force included "Nine lakhs infantrymen, Three hundred elephants and one lakhs cavalry".

Sankaravarman was a great conqueror, He led many conquests in South and North of his Empire.

The Darvabhisara was the first conquered territory, we must conclude that Sankaravarman's initial efforts were directed towards the recovery of the hill-trade which stretches from the Pir Pantsal range towards the plains of the Punjab, and which had been lost to Kasmir during the rule of the later Karkotas.

He subjugated Darvabhisara, the territory between the Jhelum and the Chenab in the Punjab. Prithivichandra, the king of Trigarta (modern Kangra), accepted Shankaravarman's supremacy.

At the advance of Sankaravarman's host, Prthivicandra, ruler of Trigarta, the present Kangra, is said to have approached the king in order to offer homage, but to have subsequently fled in terror.'' Kalhana's words do not indicate an actual conquest of his territory. Considering that Sankaravarman's subsequent route lies towards the Indus, it does not seem probable that any material success was achieved by him in the hills east of the Ravi. Prthivicandra's name is not found in the genealogical list of the Katoch Rajas who have ruled Kungra from an early period. But its formation, with the ending -candra, agrees with the traditional naming of members of that family.

The main force of Sankaravarman's attack appears to have spent itself in a victory over Alakhana, the ruler of Gurjara. This territory, the name of which is preserved in that of the modern town of Gujrat, comprised, as I have shown else where, the upper portion of the flat Doab between the Jehlam and Cinab rivers south of Darvabhisara, and probably also a part of the Punjab plain farther east, Alakhana is said to have saved his kingdom by ceding to Sankaravarman the Takka-land, by which designation a tract adjoining the lower hills east of the Cinab is probably meant. Where ' the superior king ' Bhoja is to be located, whose power Sankaravarman is next supposed to have curbed, remains doubtful. His identity with the king Bhoja whose rule over Kanauj is indicated by inscriptions ranging between a.d. 862-883, has been frequently assumed, but cannot be proved. During the reign of Mahendrapala, Bjoja's successor, Sankaravarman, had wrested all the territories and areas from the Gujara-pratiharas which had earlier been subjugated by King Bhoj.

Sankaravarman's greatest victory against the king of Gujara in the Punjab, the latter being helped by the Lalliya Shahi. Sankaravarman led a successful expedition to Kabul, where he defeated Lalliya, the Brahman ruler of Kabul.
