= Avantivarman of Kashmir =

King of Kashmir from 855 to 883

Avantivarman
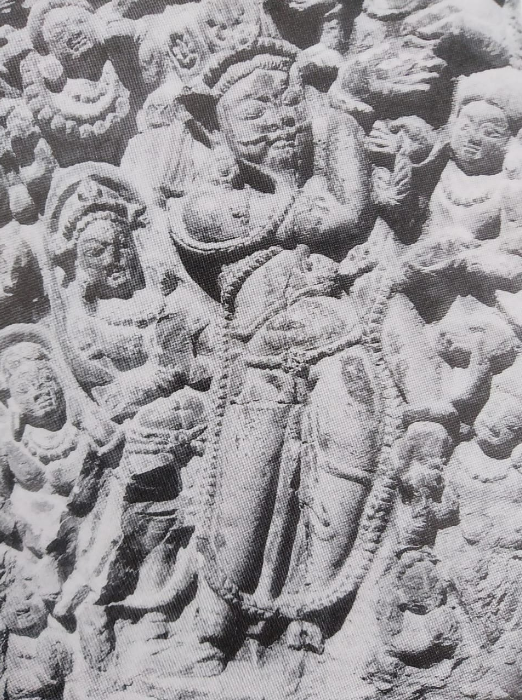
- King Avantivarman and his Queen

King of Kashmir
- Reign: 855 – 11 June 883
- Predecessor: Utpalapida
- Successor: Sankaravarman
- Died: 11 June 883
- Issue: Sankaravarman
- House: Utpala
- Father: Sukhavarman
- Religion: Vaishnavism
- Relatives: Utpala (paternal grandfather)

Avantivarman (died 11 June 883) was the founder of the Utpala dynasty and King of Kashmir from 855 to 883. He built the Avantiswami Temple in Awantipora, Pulwama.

== Reign ==
Avantivarman was the grandson of Utpala, one of the five brothers who had taken control of the Karkota throne. Raised by Utpala's minister Sura, Anantivarman ascended the throne of Kashmir in 855, establishing the Utpala dynasty and ending the rule of the Karkotas. Avantivarman appointed Suyya, an engineer and architect as his prime minister. The country had been badly affected due to civil wars over the prior forty years. Avantivarman's reign restored the economy. Suyya carried out desilting of the Jhelum River and diverted its course.

He took various steps to tone up the administration, establish internal security and rehabilitate the state resources. He effectively curbed the power of the Damaras, a turbulent class of rural aristocrats. But his greater claim to fame was the great engineering works carried out by his skilful minister Suyya. He removed the boulders which obstructed the normal flow of the river Vitasta (Jhelum) and built high embankments along the river to prevent landslides. He even changed the course of the river Jhelum so that it met Indus and thereby made the extensive lands in the neighbourhood fit for cultivation.

Suyya even arranged, on a permanent basis, the distribution of water for each village according to its need. Kalhana perhaps is not magniloquent when he says of him 'Suyya, who possessed accumulated religious merit (achieved) in a single birth that holy work which Vishnu accomplished in four incarnations.' The memory of Suyya is preserved in the new town of Suyyapura (modern-day Sopore) in Baramulla district of Jammu and Kashmir called after its builder Suyya.

Notable poets, Ranakar and Ananvardhana, were part of his court. During this time, the price of paddy declined from 36 to 20 dinars. Suyya is said to have drained a large chunk of wasteland as prime minister. Suyyapur or Sopore township in Baramulla district was named for him.

While Suyya was working in Sopore, no one came to bathe in the water. The king ordered that a part of his treasury be thrown into the water, leading a large number of people into the river to get as many coins as they could. Suyya continued and cleared the river of silt.

== Art and architecture ==
Avantivarman was a patron of the arts. The most notable scholar of his time was Anandhavardana, the author of Dhvanyaloka. He founded the cities of Avantipur and Suyapur. He built many Hindu temples dedicated to Vishnu and Shiva as well as Buddhist monasteries. Notable among the temples were the temples of Avantiswara and Avantiswami dedicated to Shiva and Vishnu respectively in Avantipur.

== Death and succession ==
Avantivarman died in 883 A.D. His death was followed by a civil war among several descendants of Utpala for the throne. Ultimately, the minister Ratnavardhana secured the throne for Shankaravarman, the son of Avantivarman. Shankaravarman's reign (885-902 A.D.) is memorable for his spirited foreign policy.

== Coinage ==
Coinage of king Avantivarman
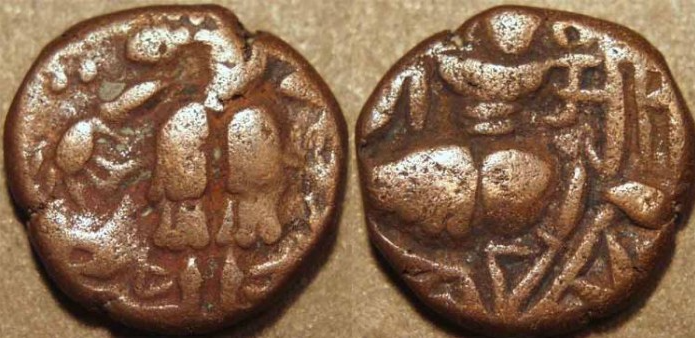

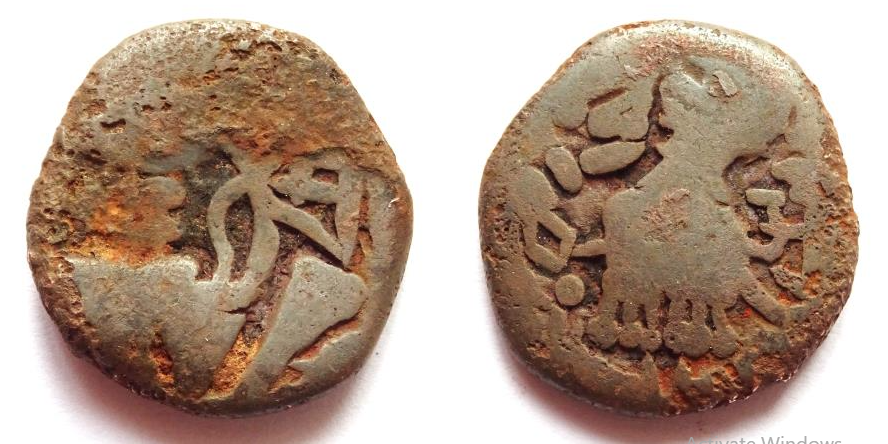
