= Buddhism in Kashmir =

Buddhism in Kashmir

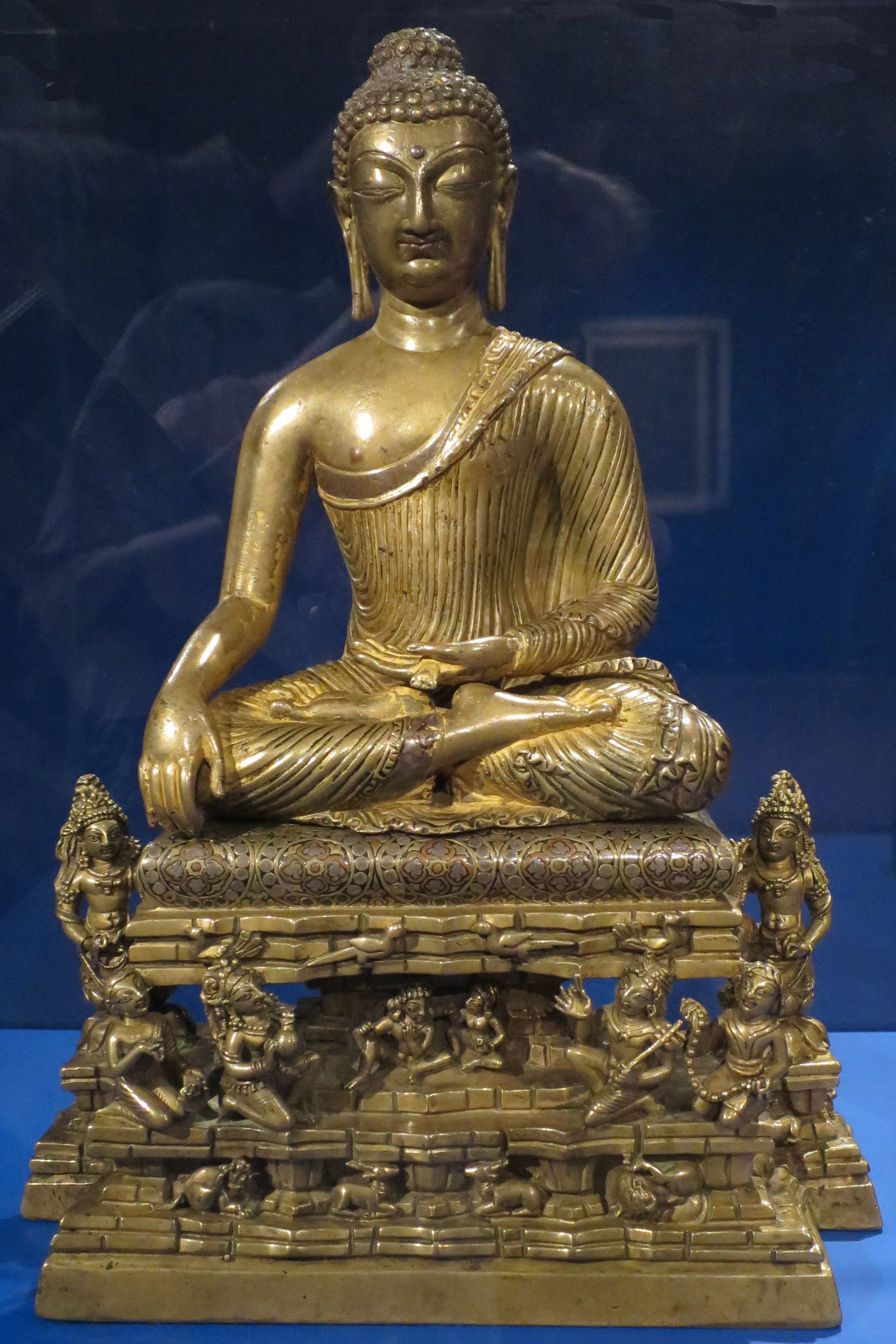
'Buddha and Adorants on Mount Meru' from Kashmir, c. 700, Norton Simon Museum

Buddhism was an important part of the classical Kashmiri culture, as is reflected in the Nilamata Purana and Kalhana's Rajatarangini. Buddhism is generally believed to have become dominant in Kashmir in the time of Emperor Ashoka, although it was widespread there long before his time, enjoying the patronage not only of Buddhist rulers but of Hindu rulers too. From Kashmir, it spread to the neighbouring Ladakh, Tibet and China proper. Accounts of patronage of Buddhism by the rulers of Kashmir are found in the Rajatarangini and also in the accounts of three Chinese visitors to Kashmir during 630-760 AD.

== Origins ==
Buddhist sources attribute the origin of Buddhism in Kashmir to a monk of Varanasi, Majjhantika, who was also a disciple of Ananda. According to the Ceylonese Chronicle, after the conclusion of the Third Buddhist Council, Ashoka sent missionaries across countries to spread Buddhism. Majjhantika was sent to Kashmir and Gandhara (modern day Afghanistan). The story of Majjhantika is also told in several other Buddhist texts such as the Ashokavadana and Avadanakalpalata. However the Buddhist text Divyavadana states that several monks from Kashmir were invited by Ashoka to Patliputra (present day Patna, Bihar). However Kalhana describes the establishment of some Vihāras during the reign of King Surendra, predecessor of Ashoka.

== Surrendra ==
The first known ruler of Kashmir, Gonanda (mentioned by Kalhana in his Rajatarangini), was related to Jarasandha, who ruled Magadha during the time of the Kurukshetra War. Surrendra was perhaps the first Buddhist ruler of Kashmir. He erected the first vihāras there. One of these, known as Narendrabhavana, was in the city of Sauraka (Suru, beyond the Zoji La.) The other vihāra was at Saurasa, corresponding to the village Sowur (Soura) on the shore of Anchar Lake to the north of Srinagar.

== Mauryan period ==
=== Ashoka ===
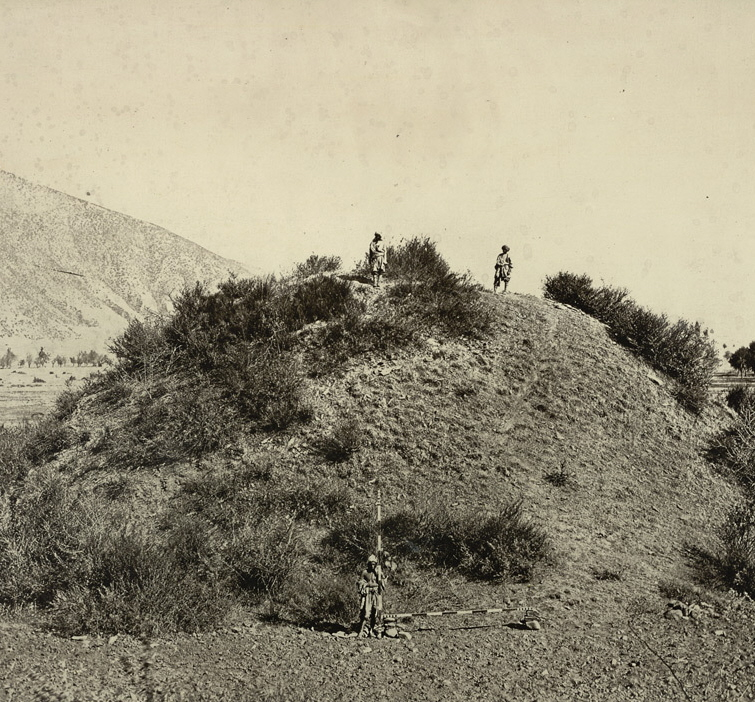
Stupa Jayendra Vihar at Ushkur (Huṣkapur) near Baramulla, during excavations in 1869

Kalhana's in his 12th century historical chronicle Rajatarangini, mentioned king Ashoka of Kashmir as a devout Buddhist who built many stupas and Shiva temples. The provincial capital Srinagar, which he established, was 'resplendent with prosperity and wealth.'

According to some Buddhist writers including Taranatha, the Buddhist preacher Madhyantika introduced saffron cultivation into Kashmir. Buddhism and Shaivism flourished side by side in Kashmir during Ashoka's time and received the Emperor's patronage in equal measure. Kalhana notes that Ashoka built two Shiva temples at Vijayeshvara (Bijbehara), and ordered several others renovated. In Vitastatra (Vethavutur) and at Shuskaletra (Hukhalitar) he built a number of viharas and stupas.

=== Ashoka's successors ===
Buddhism suffered a temporary eclipse during the reign of Ashoka's successors Jalauka and Damodara. Kalhana, asserted that a large number of Buddhist scholars were vanquished in debates with Jalauka's guru Avadhuta, and hence traditional observances were slowly revived. Later, however, Jalauka created a big vihāra, the Krityashramavihara in the vicinity of Varahamula (Baramulla), which still existed as late as the 11th century. The history of Kashmir after Damodara is not certain until the time of the Kushanas.

== Kushana period ==
The Kushana period saw a great resurgence of Buddhism in Kashmir, especially during the reign of Kanishka. The fourth Buddhist Council was held in Kashmir, under the presidency of Katyayaniputra, in Kanishka's time. The south Indian Buddhist philosopher Nagarjuna lived in Kashmir during the Kushana period.

== Post-Kushana reaction ==
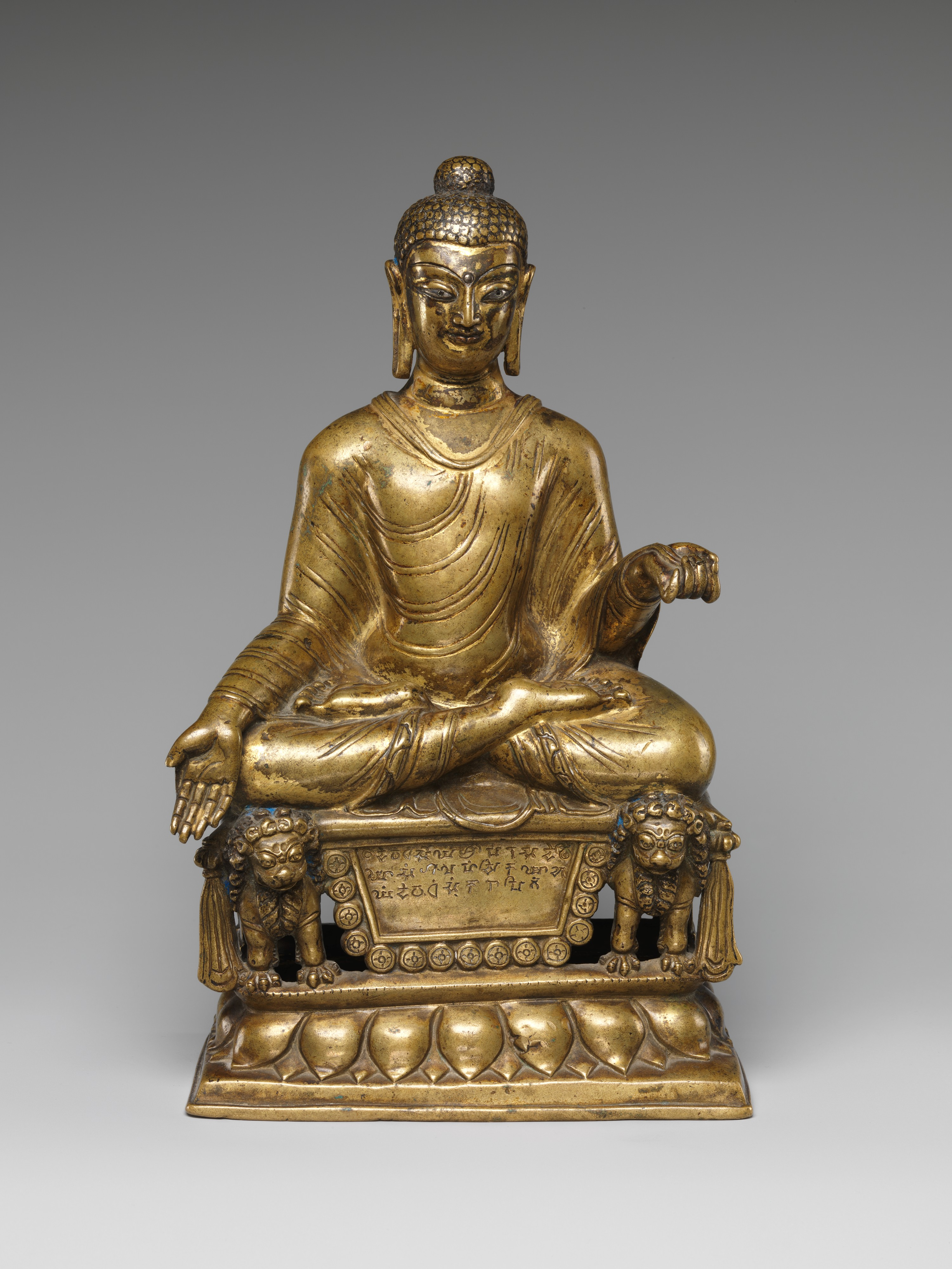
Enthroned Buddha with inscription, Gilgit Kingdom, circa 600 CE.

During the reign of Abhimanyu, which in Kalhana's chronicle follows that of Kanishka, Buddhist scholars under the guidance of Nagarjuna defeated the Shaivite clergy in debates, encouraging people to choose Buddhism. However, during the time of Chandradeva, revival of knowledge of the works of Patanjali, like the Mahabhashya which had become rare, led to a resurgence of Shaivism. By the time of Gonanda, the old philosophy was completely revived. Nothing is known about the religious affiliations of Pratapaditya, a scion of the Gupta dynasty, and his successors, except that they are stated to have ruled well, and accorded the fullest liberty of faith.

Buddhism is stated by Kalhana and Hiuen Tsang to have suffered severe setbacks under the Huns, especially under Mihirakula, whom Hiuen Tsang describes as a great persecutor of the Buddhists.

== Meghavahana ==
Upon Mihirakula's death, Kashmir was ruled by Meghavahana, who belonged to the old ruling dynasty of Kashmir. Meghavahana was a staunch Buddhist, who issued a proclamation against killing of all animals at the very time of his coronation, and built numerous stupas.

== Xuanzang in Kashmir ==
Xuanzang arrived in Kashmir taking the route from Tibet and Ladakh. He had a significant influence in spreading Buddhism in Kashmir. When he had first arrived in Kashmir, Buddhism was a widespread religion. He later proceeded to Harsha's empire to learn more about Buddhism.

== Buddhist influence in Kashmir ==
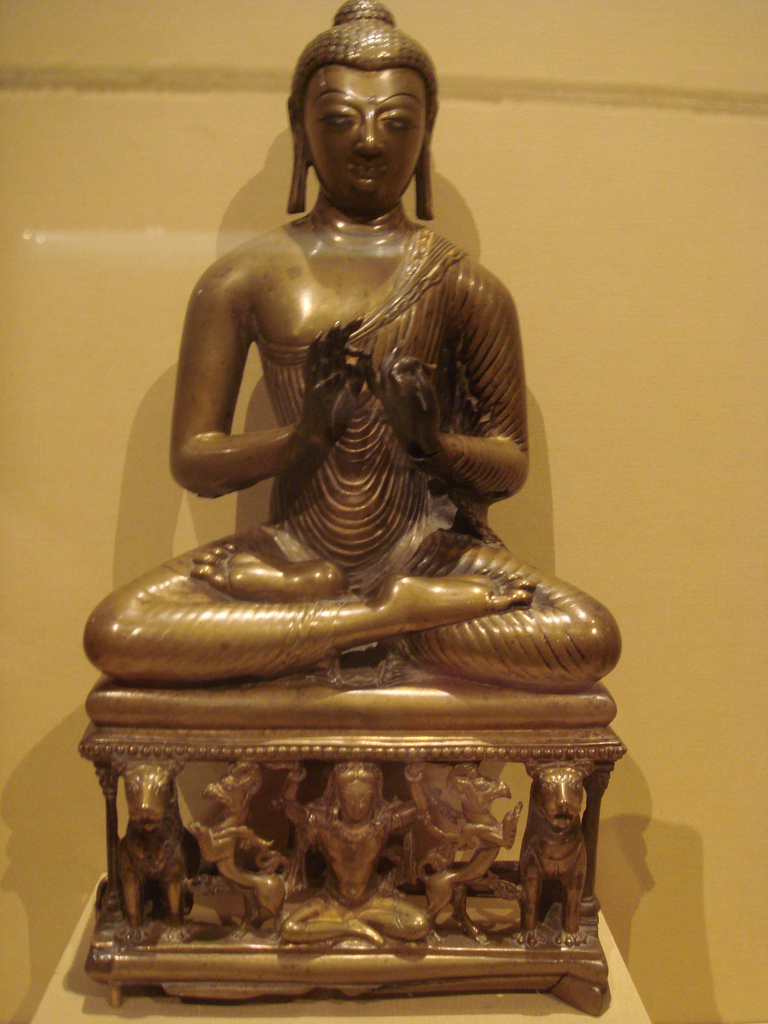
WLA lacma Buddha Shakyamuni or the Jina Buddha Vairochana Kashmir

Before and during Kalhana's time, there was apparently no distinction between "Hindus" and Buddhists in Kashmir. Kalhana himself used Buddhist terms and expressions as a Buddhist would.

Nilamata Purana was the text of the worshippers of Nila Naga; Naga worship was common in Kashmir. It mentions the prevalence of Buddhist worship in Kashmir.

According to the Nilamata Purana of Kashmir, as translated by Dr. Ved Kumari, it states:

- 709-710a. O Brahman, the god Visnu, the lord of the world, shall be (born as) the preceptor of the world, Buddha by name, at the time when the Pusya is joined with the moon, in the month of Vaisaksha, in the twenty-eighth Kali Age.
- 710b-12. Listen to how his worship should be performed in the bright-half, from that period onwards, in the future. The image of Buddha should be bathed (with water rendered holy) with all medicinal herbs, all jewels, and all scents, in accordance with the sayings of the Sakyas. The dwellings of the Sakyas (i.e. Viharas) should be whitewashed with care.
- 713. Here and there, the Caityas—the abodes of the god—should be provided with paintings. The festival, swarming with actors and dancers, should be celebrated.
- 714. The Sakyas should be honored with Civara (the dress of a Buddhist mendicant), food, and books. All this should be done till the advent of Magha.
- 715. O twice-born, eatable offerings should be made for three days. Worship with flowers, clothes, etc., and charity for the poor (should continue for three days).

Kalhana's Rajatarangini mentions that a monumental metallic image of Buddha once stood in Srinagar, which was eventually destroyed by Sikandar Butshikan. A significant number of Buddhist bronzes have survived.

A Buddhist bhikshu was present in Baramulla in the 13th century. The Kashmiri Pandits still worship the triratna symbol.

After the Islamization of Kashmir by sultans like Sikandar Butshikan, much of Hinduism was gone and a little of Buddhism remained. Fazl writes, "The third time that the writer accompanied His Majesty to the delightful valley of Kashmir, he met a few old men of this persuasion (Buddhism), but saw none among the learned."

== Buddhist art ==
Kashmir was a major center of Buddhist art, and there is evidence of significant influence of Kashmir style on 11-13th century Tibetan art.

While Buddhism is now extinct in the valley of Kashmir, masterpieces of Buddhist art from Kashmir are present in many museums.

== See also ==
- History of Kashmir
- History of India
- Kashmiri Hindus
- Kashmir Valley
- Buddhism
- Hinduism
- History of Buddhism
- History of Hinduism
