= Verinag =

Verinag Vērnag
- Town
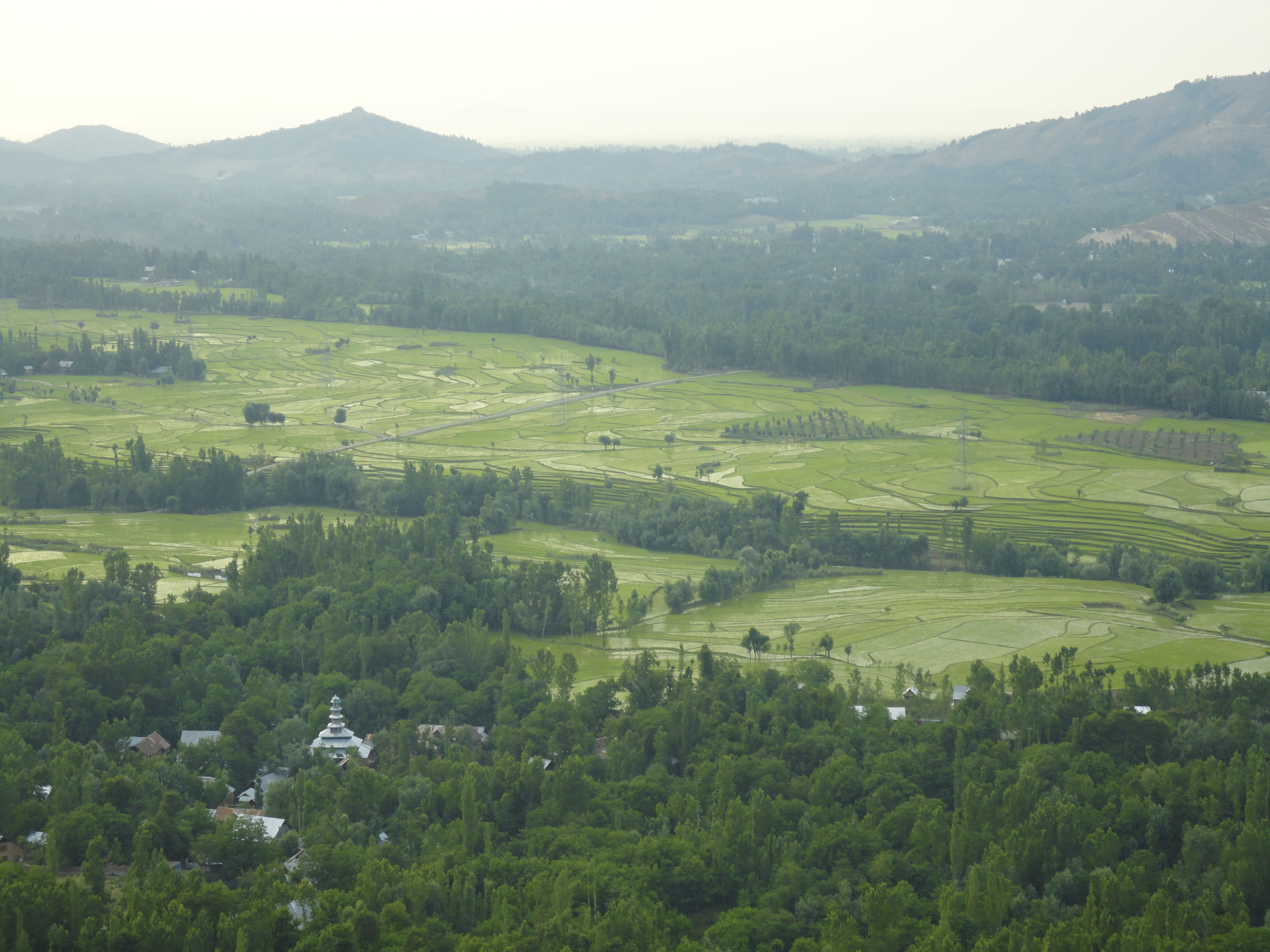
- View of Verinag town in Kashmir, India
- Nickname: Gateway of kashmir
- Location in Jammu and Kashmir, India Verinag (India)
- Coordinates: 33.55°N 75.25°E
- Country: India
- Union territory: Jammu & Kashmir
- District: Anantnag
- Named for: Verinag Spring
- Elevation: 1,851 m (6,073 ft)

Population (2001)
  - Total: 16,727

Languages
  - Official: Kashmiri, Urdu, Dogri, English
- Time zone: UTC+5:30 (IST)
- PIN: 192212
- Vehicle registration: JK03
- Sex ratio: 1000/1000 ♂/♀
- Website: verinag.com

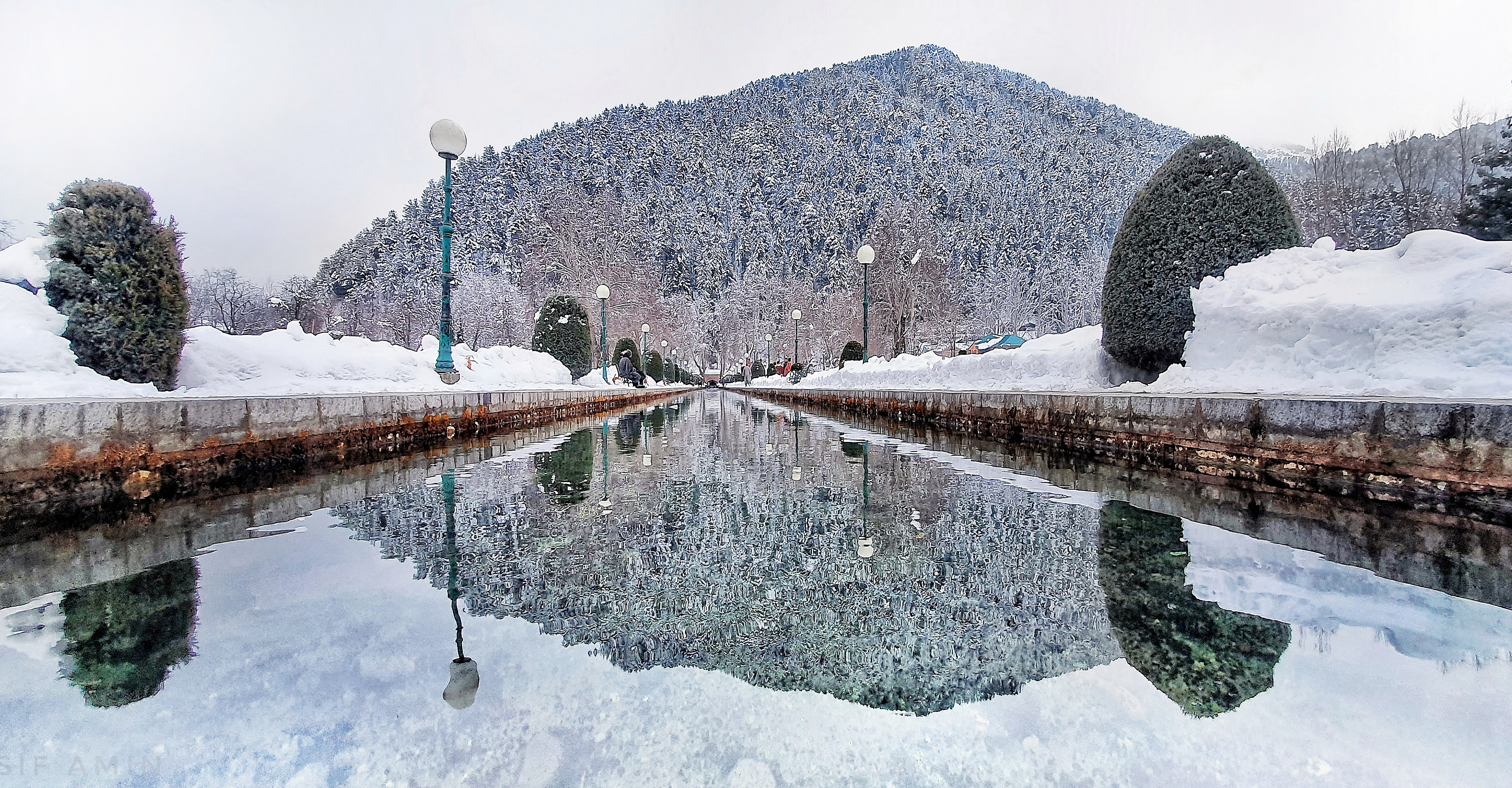
Snow-clad view of Verinag Garden

Verinag (Urdu pronunciation: [ʋeːɾiːnɑːɡ] ; Kashmiri pronunciation: [ʋeːrnaːɡ]) is a town named after and famous for the Verinag spring and Mughal Garden, near Anantnag city in the Anantnag district of the union territory of Jammu and Kashmir, India. It is also called "gateway of Kashmir" and is a notified area committee with tehsil status (Shahabad Bala Verinag) and is about 26 kilometers away from Anantnag and approximately 78 kilometres south-east from Srinagar which is the summer capital of the union territory of Jammu and Kashmir. Verinag is also the first tourist spot of Kashmir Valley when travelling by road from Jammu, the winter capital of the union territory of Jammu and Kashmir towards Srinagar. There is an octagonal stone basin at Verinag Spring and an arcade surrounding it which were built by Mughal emperor Jahangir in 1620 A.D. Later, a beautiful garden next to this spring, was laid out by his son Shah Jahan. This spring is known to never dry up or overflow. Verinag Spring is also the major source of river Jhelum. Verinag Spring and Mughal Arcade surrounding it is officially recognized by Archaeological Survey of India as a Monument of National Importance.

Verinag spring is the main source of River Jehlum, (vyeth in local Kashmiri language) which flows throughout the valley of Kashmir and finally enters into Pakistan-administered Kashmir.

== Verinag Spring and Mughal Garden ==
Verinag Garden
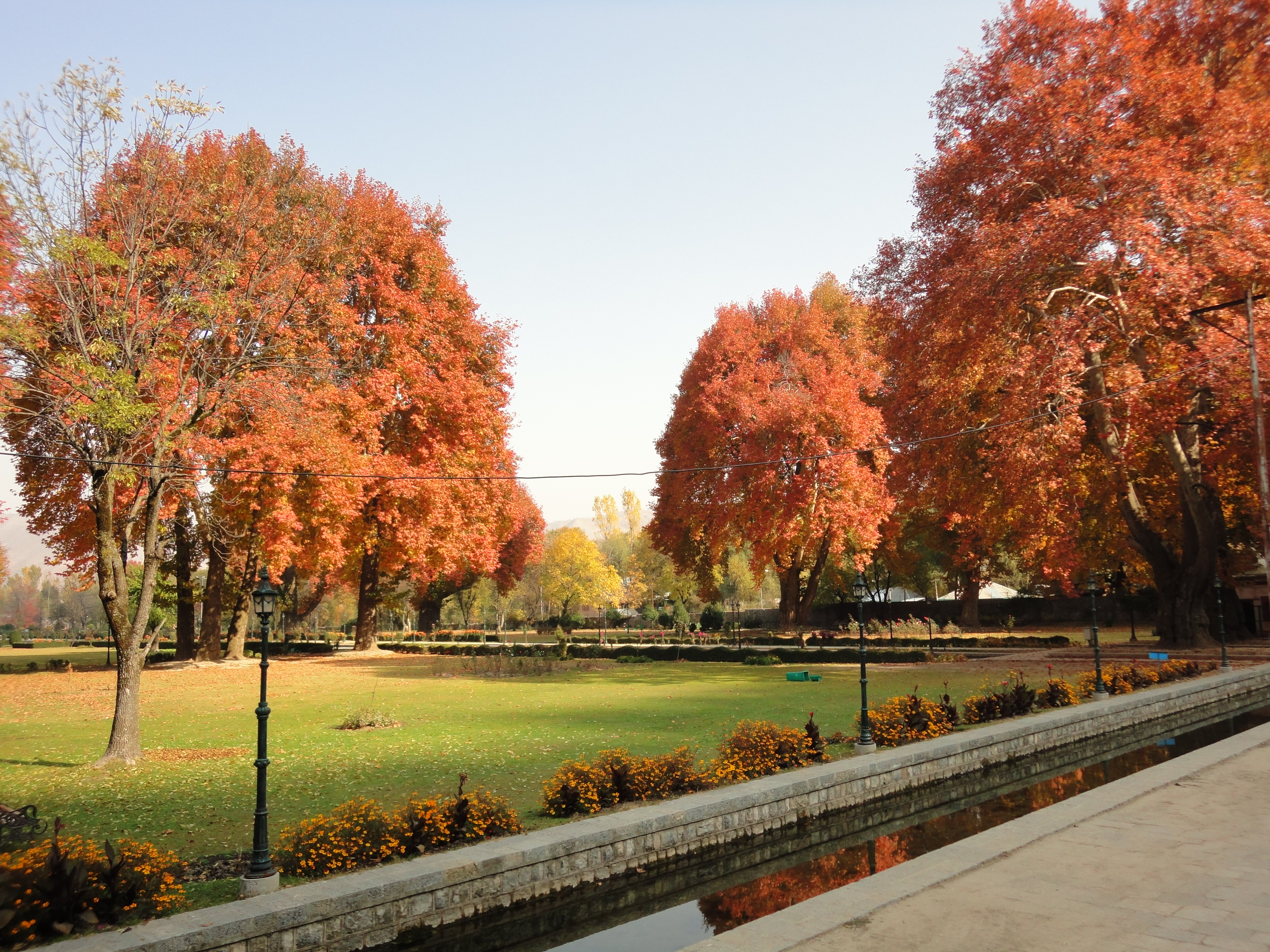
- Verinag Garden in Autumn
- Interactive map of Verinag Garden
- Type: Mughal garden
- Location: Anantnag, Jammu and Kashmir, India
- Area: 50,600 square metres (12.5 acres)
- Opened: 1620 A.D.
- Founder: Jahangir
- Owner: Jammu and Kashmir Tourism Department
- Operator: Jammu and Kashmir Tourism Department
- Website: www.jktourism.org

Verinag spring which is in Verinag town, issues from a high scarp of a mountain spur, and is considered the source of the Jhelum River. It is situated at the bottom of a hill covered by pine trees and evergreen plants. Verinag spring was originally an irregular and shapeless pond, and water, oozing out from different places in it and spread about and formed a little marsh. Emperor Jahangir, whose artistic taste for polishing the beauty of nature is well known, saw this and at once determined to improve it. He built the octagonal tank of sculptured stones round it, so that all water was collected therein, for which carvers were brought from Iran. A garden was also built by Jahangir next to this natural spring which is of pre-Islamic religious significance. The construction date of the octagonal tank and the garden is 1029 Hijri or 1620 A.D, during the 15th year of the Jahangir's reign, which is duly inscribed on a stone slab built into the southern wall of the spring. Seven years later, Jahangir's son Shah Jahan, who was no less a lover of natural beauty, constructed cascades and aqueducts in straight lines through and around the fine garden which he, in order to enhance further the beauty of the place laid out in front of the spring. He also built hot and cold baths to the east of this garden, just outside it, of which little trace is now left. The water contained in an octagonal spring has crystal blue water in which a variety of big fishes live. History and the carvings on stones in Persian on the walls surrounding the spring tell about how this great source of underwater spring is contained without revealing its architecture. The water is collected in a pool surrounded by arched recesses and then flows down a 300-yard canal to the Bihat River. Jahangir wished to be buried at Verinag gardens, but his wife, Nur Jahan, disobeyed his wishes. Today nothing remains of the pavilions which once decorated the area.

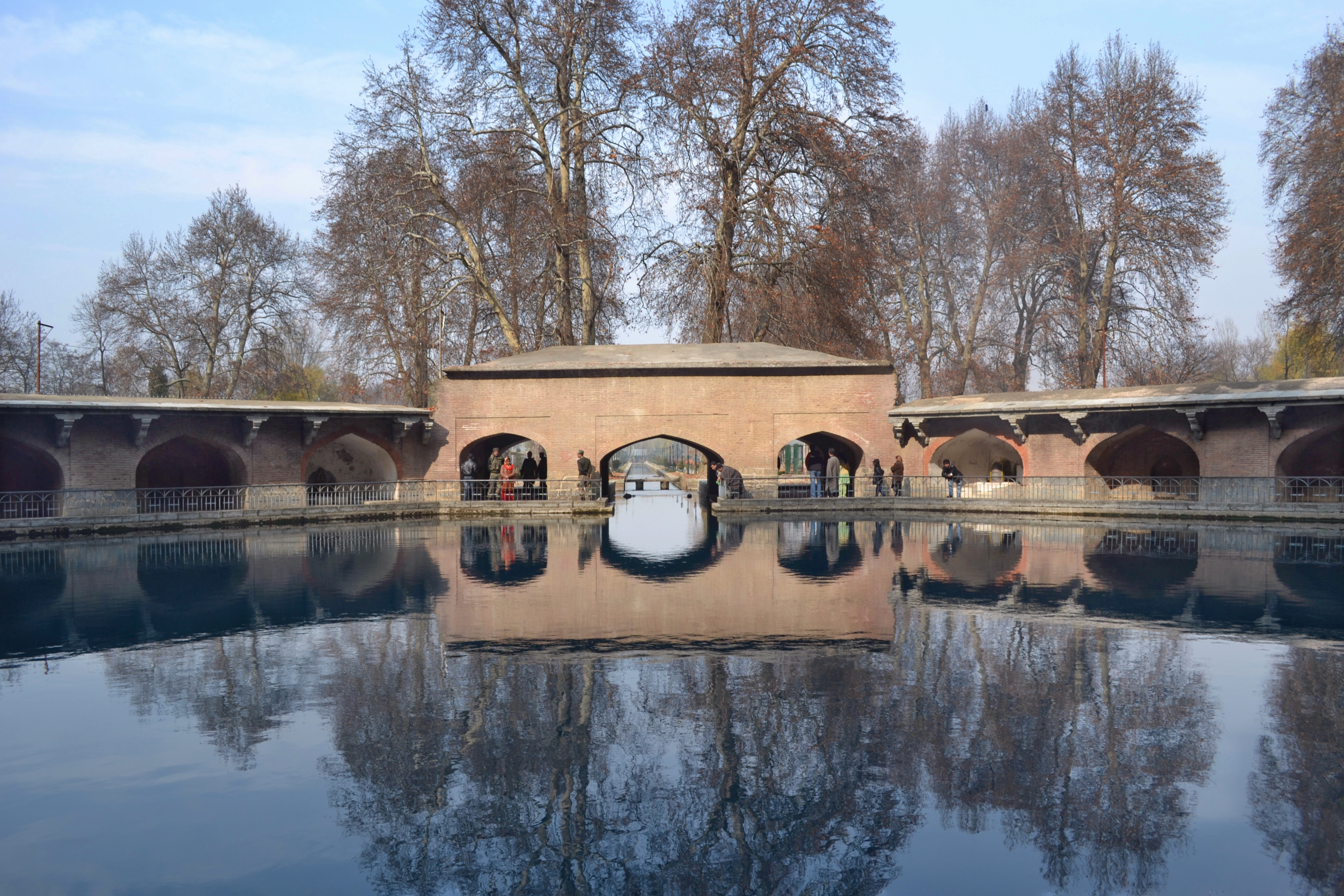
Mughal arcad and spring at Verinag.

According to a legend, goddess Vitasta (Jhelum) wanted to take rise from this spring, but it happened that when she came, Shiva was staying here, whereupon she had to go back and then she took her rise from Vithavatur (Vitastatra), a spring about a mile to the north-west of this place. Virah in Sanskrit means to 'go back' and 'nag' means a water spring and, as Vitasta had to go back from this place, it came to be called Virahnag or "Vernag". This spring is also considered to be the residing place of Nilanaga, who is placed by ancient tradition, at the head of all Nagas or spring-deities of Kashmir. Thus this spring is also known as "Nilakunda" or spring of Nila. According to Nilamata Purana, the valley of Kashmir was once a lake called "Satisara" or lake of Parvati. Near this spring, Lord Vishnu is said to have first placed the point of the plough with which Satisara was drained and here goddess Parvati was brought to light from the netherworld in the form of the river Vitasta by stroke of Lord Shiva's trident.

The spring is at the exact centre almost 50 feet (as the locals tell about the depth) underwater from where the water continuously comes up and flows into the gardens facing the spring. It is also a sacred place for Hindus as there is a Lord Shiva shivling in one of the arcs (the very first on the left of the entry of the spring). The historical garden also has a temple inside it with some idols of Hindu goddesses.
Some 2 km away is Vithavatur (Vitastatra), supposed to be the source of river Jhelum. The waters of the many nearby springs, collectively called, Sapta Rishi, have their confluence at Sangam, where people bathe on festival days. The birth of the river is celebrated annually with a fair on the thirteenth day of the bright fortnight of the month Bhadrapada of the Hindu Calendar.

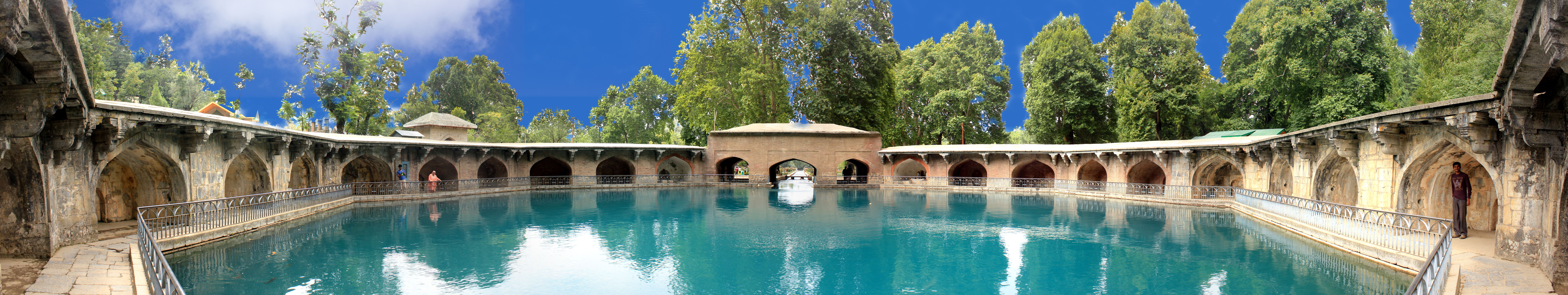
Panorama of Verinag Spring

=== Stone slabs ===
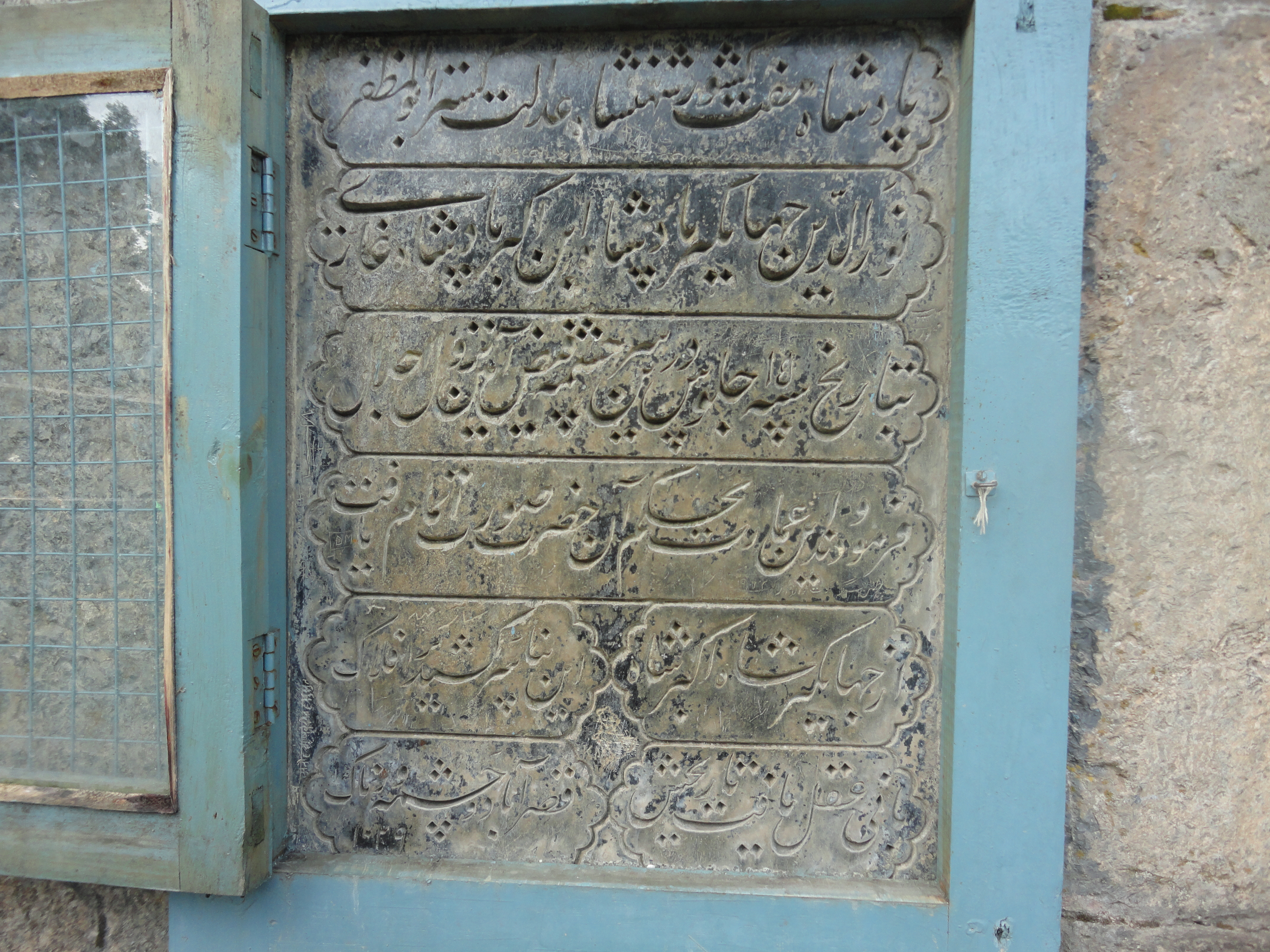
Stone slab on southern wall

There are two stone slabs built into the western and southern walls of Verinag spring, on which prose in Persian language, in praise of the spring, and the dates of construction of the tank and aqueduct, are inscribed. The translation of prose in Persian language written on stone slab built into the southern wall of spring is as follows:-

The king of seven kingdoms, the administrator
of justice, the father of victory, Nur-ud-din, Jahangir
son of Akbar, the martyr king, halted at this spring
of God's grace in the 15th year of his reign. This
construction was made by order of His Majesty.
By Jahangir, son of King Akbar,
This construction was raised to the skies.
The architect of intelligence got its date---
'May the mansion last for ever together with the spring Vernag!' (1029 Hijri)

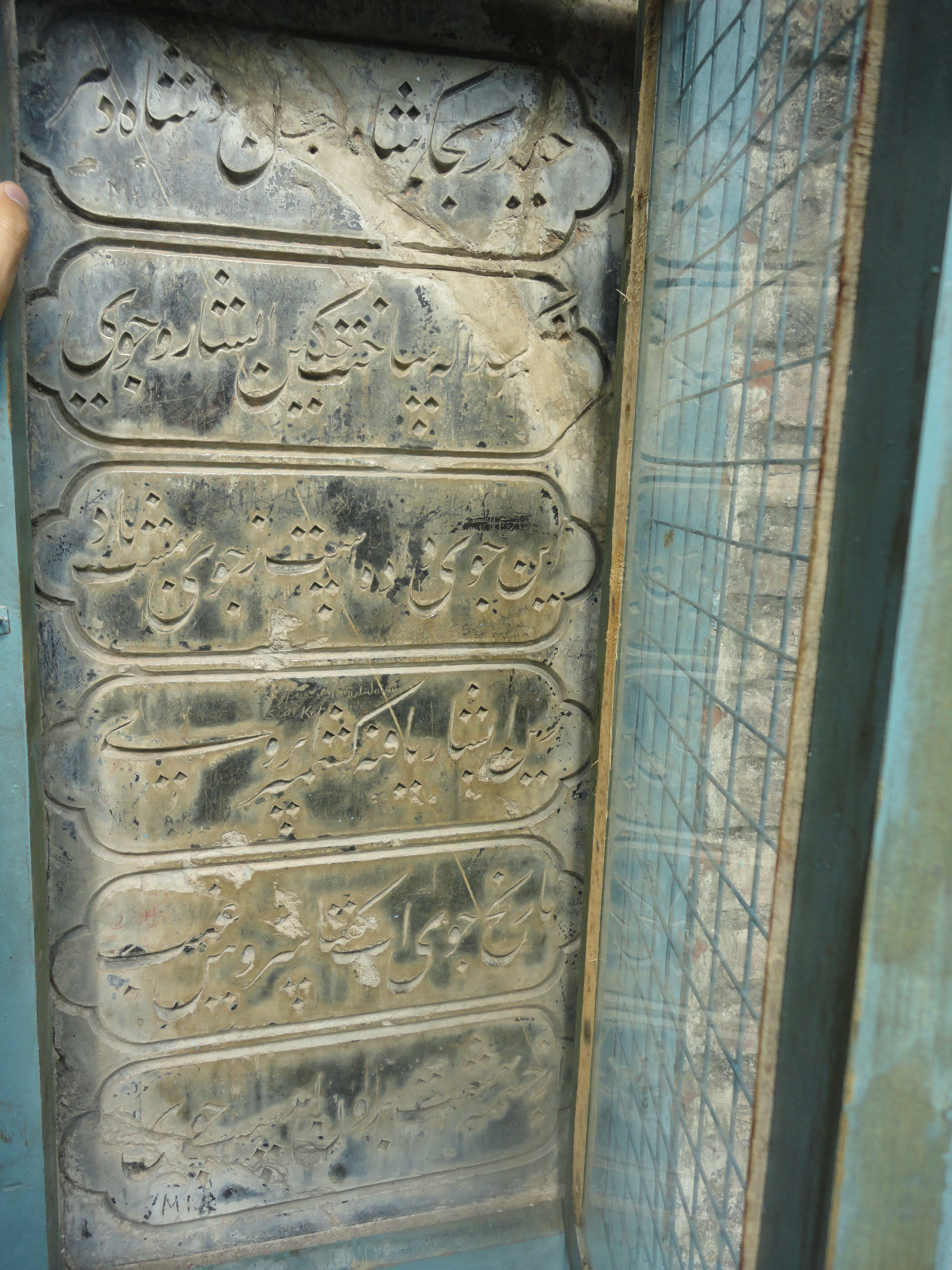
Stone slab on western wall

The translation of prose in Persian language written on stone slab built into the western wall of spring is as follows:-

Haidar, by order of Shah Jahan, the paramount
lord of his age----
God be praised—made the cascade and aqueduct
flow.
This aqueduct reminds one of the aqueduct of
paradise.
By this cascade Kashmir attained glory
The unseen Angel declared the date of
aqueduct:-
'The aqueduct has issued from the heavenly
spring' (1037 Hijri.)

=== Verinag Spring in historical texts ===
This spring has been mentioned in various historical texts. Various accounts of this spring are as follows:

- Ain-i-Akbari: Ain-i-Akbari, is a 16th-century, detailed document recording the administration of emperor Akbar's empire, written by his vizier, Abu'l-Fazl ibn Mubarak. The account of Verinag Spring in this text is as follows:

In the Vér tract of country is the source of the Bihat. It is a pool measuring a jarib which tosses in foam with an astonishing roar, and its depth is unfathomable. It goes by the name of Vernág and is surrounded by a stone embankment and to its east are temples of stone.

Bihat, as mentioned in the above-quoted text, is the name of a river in Verinag.

- Tuzk-e-Jahangiri: Tuzuk-e-Jahangiri or Tuzuk-i-Jahangiri is the autobiography of Mughal Emperor Nur-ud-din Muhammad Jahangir (1569–1627). It is also referred to as Jahangirnama. The account of Verinag Spring in this text is as follows:

The source of the Bihaṭ is a spring in Kashmir called the Vīr-nāg; in the language of India a snake is vīr-nāg. Clearly, there had been a large snake at that place. I went twice to the spring in my father's lifetime; it is 20 kos from the city of Kashmir. It is an octagonal reservoir about 20 yards by 20. Near it are the remains of a place of worship for recluses; cells cut out of the rock and numerous caves. The water is exceedingly pure. Although I could not guess its depth, a grain of poppy-seed is visible until it touches the bottom. There were many fish to be seen in it. As I had heard that it was unfathomable, I ordered them to throw in a cord with a stone attached, and when this cord was measured in gaz it became evident that the depth was not more than once and a half the height of a man. After my accession I ordered them to build the sides of the spring round with stone, and they made a garden round it with a canal; and built halls and houses about it, and made a place such that travellers over the world can point out few like it.

- Rajatarangini: Rājatarangiṇī is a metrical historical chronicle of north-western Indian subcontinent, particularly the kings of Kashmir, written in Sanskrit by Kashmiri Brahman Kalhaṇa in the 12th century CE. Verinag Spring in this text is known by the name of Nilakunda. The account of Verinag Spring in this text is as follows:

That (land) is protected by Nīla, the lord of all Nāgas, whose regal parasol is formed by the circular pond (of the Nīlakunda) with the Vitastā's newly rising stream as its stick. There Gauri, though she has assumed the form of the Vitastā, still keeps her wonted inclination.

The "land" referred to in above-quoted text is Kashmir. Vitastā is another name for river Jhelum.

=== Verinag Mughal Garden Design ===
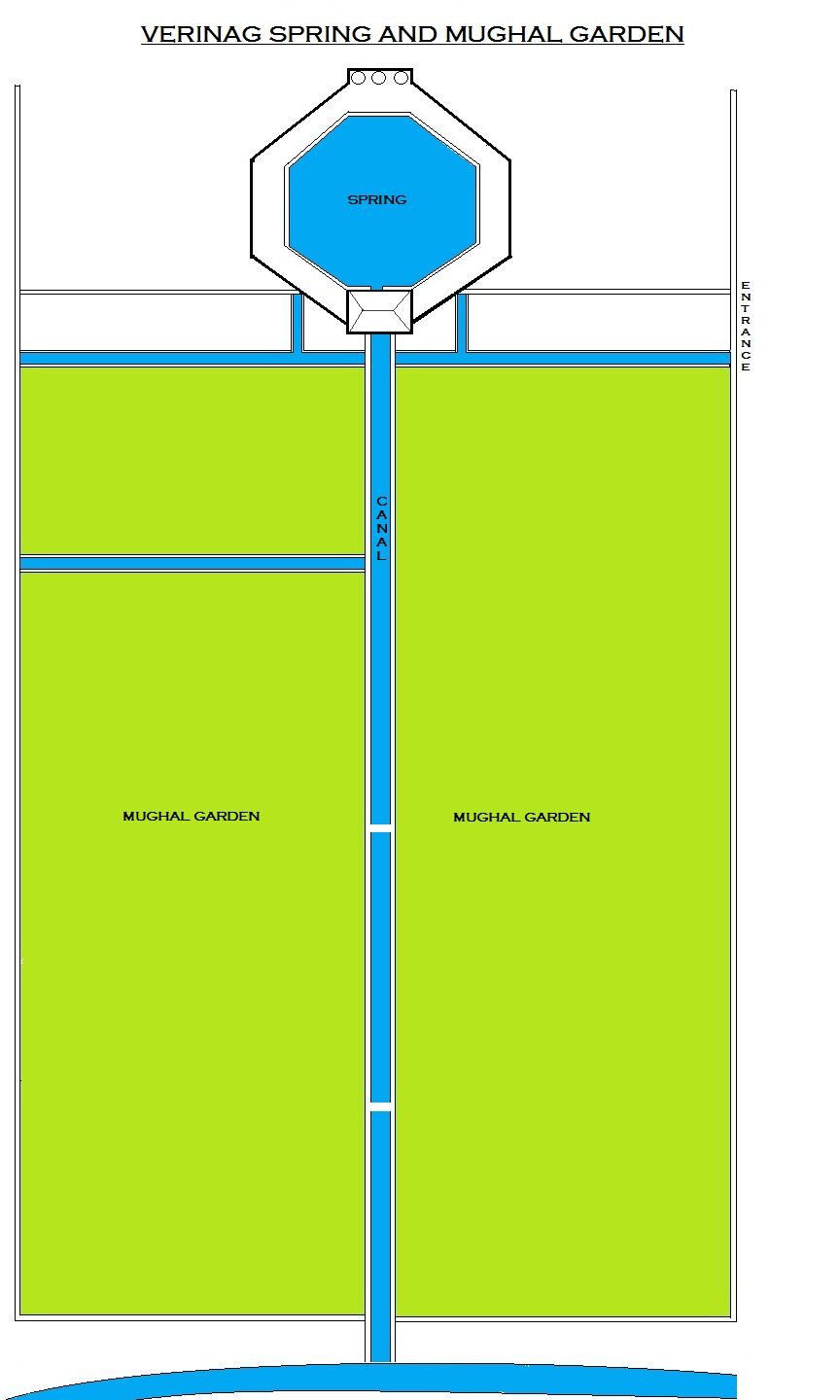
Verinag Mughal Garden Plan

The design of the Verinag garden is an adaptation of the traditional Persian Charbagh(four gardens). The Charbagh takes its inspiration from the Quranic description of heaven as having four rivers, of wine, honey, milk, and water. The traditional Charbagh is uniformly shaped, with a water source in its center and four (char) radiating streams which divide the garden (bagh) into four parts. As with other Kashmiri gardens, Vernag is located on a steep hillside, with its water source at the top. The traditional Charbagh design had to be altered to fit the site's topography, as the source of water shifted from the traditional center of the square garden to the highest point of the garden. Given the limited options for flowing water (which could only run in one direction, from top to bottom), the double symmetry of the Persian garden was reduced to a central water axis, and the other traditional streams were minimized, appearing only in the form of the east–west canal.

The garden is rectangular in shape, measuring 460 meters by 110 meters. It runs a few degrees off a south–north axis, moving down the side of a hill. The garden is bisected on its long axis by a water canal that transfers water from the water source at the southern (upper) end into the Jhelum River on its northern end. Another canal running east–west intersects the main water canal at its southern end. The entrances to the garden lie at both ends of this east–west canal.

From the entrances, a walkway takes the visitor towards the octagonal pool, which is approached through a colonnade. This colonnade, composed of 24 arches, surrounds the pool, whose water comes from the spring deep below. The pool's water is clear and filled with carp. The water exits from the pool into the main axial water canal, which measures 305 meters long by 3.65 meters wide.

=== Verinag Spring Gallery ===
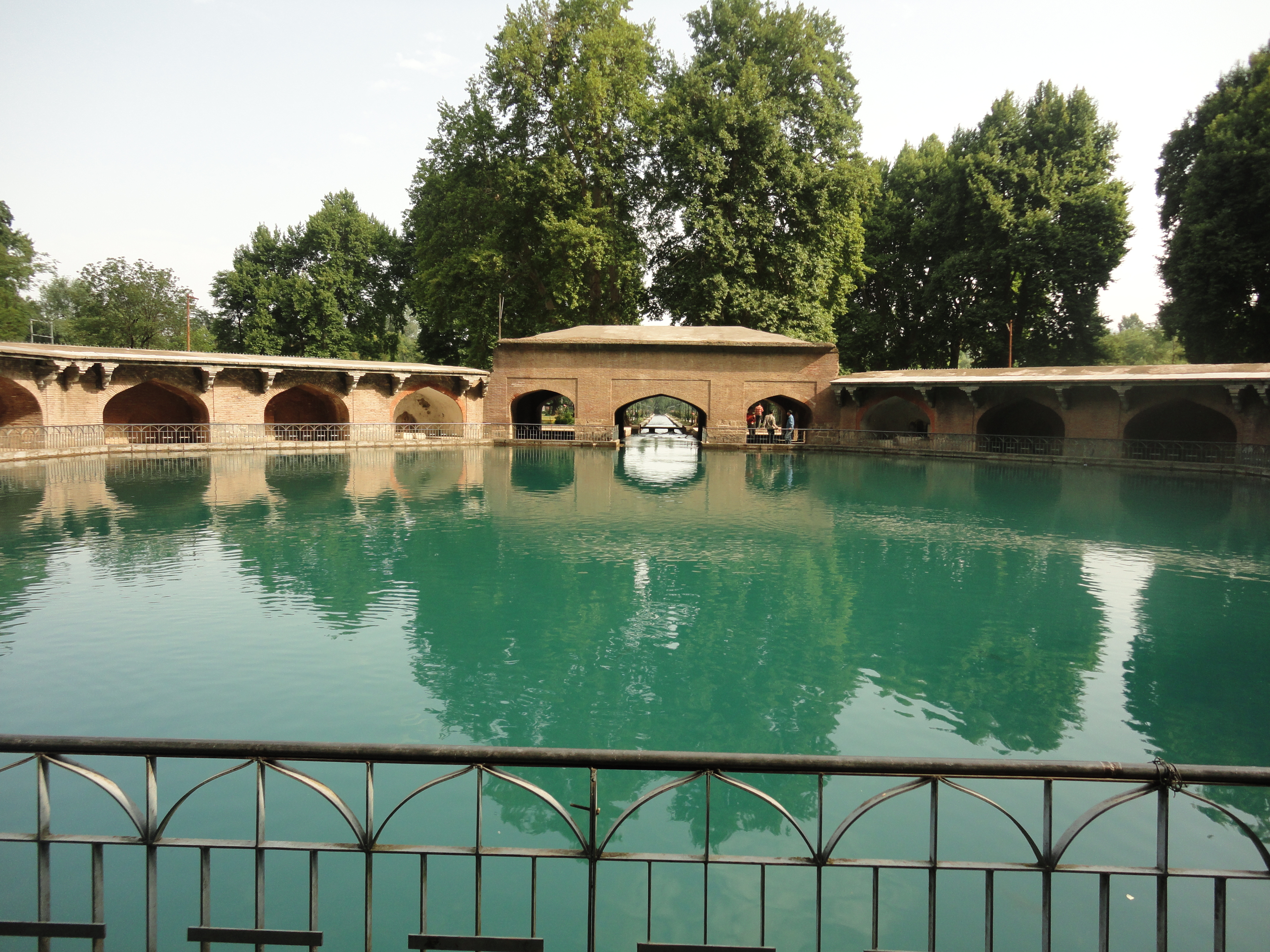
Verinag Spring

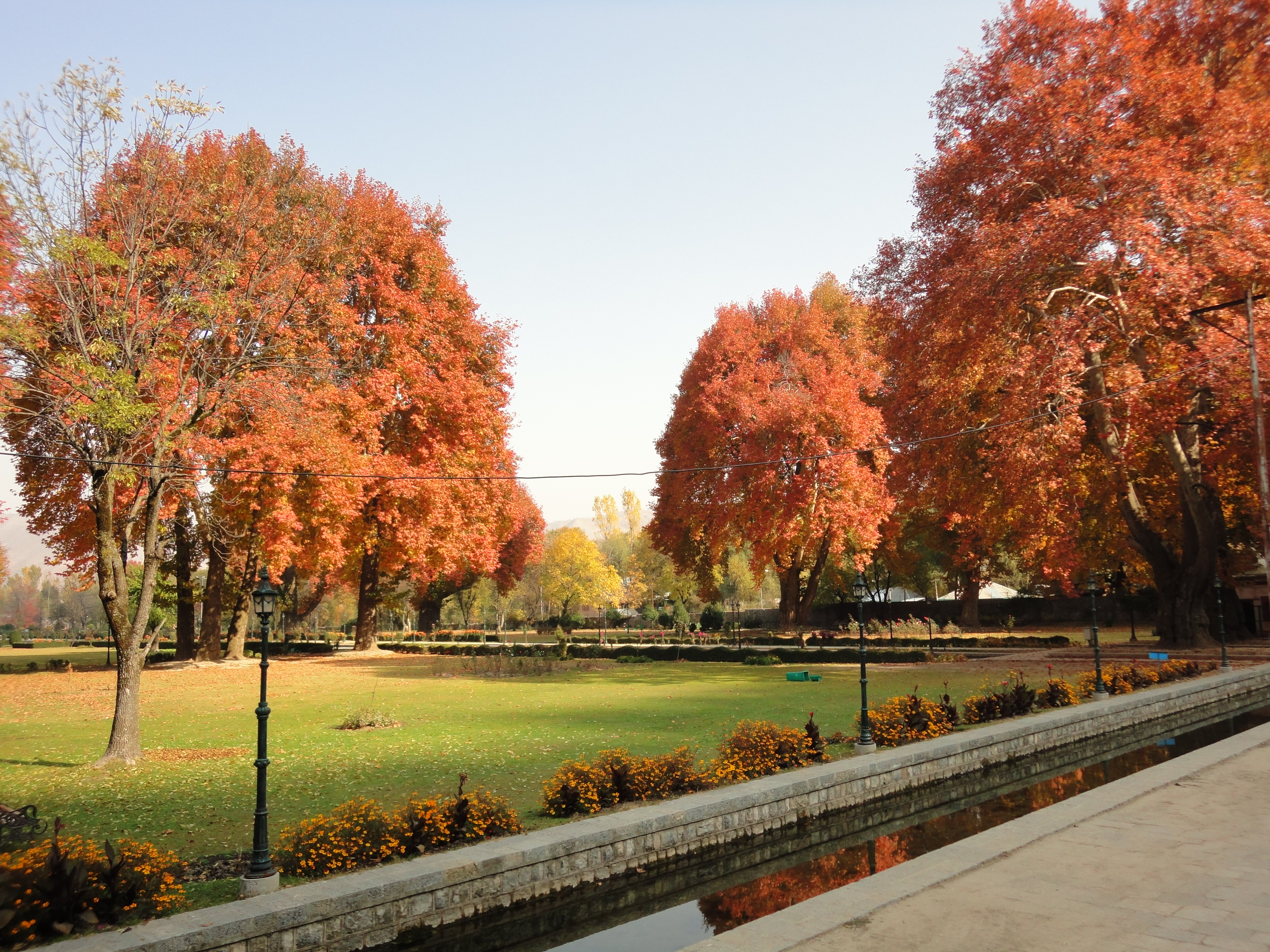
Mughal garden next to Verinag Spring

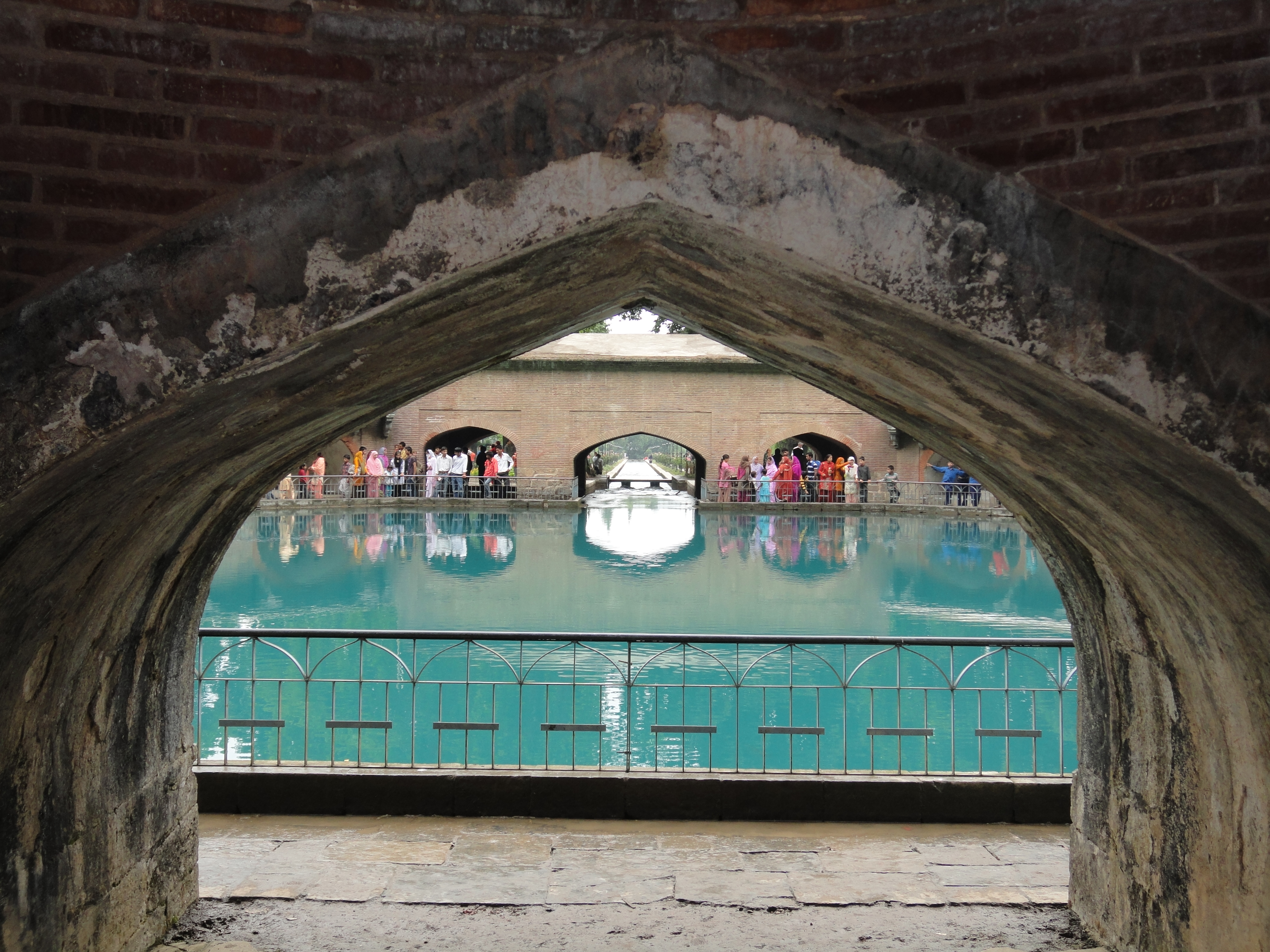
View of Spring from inside the arcade

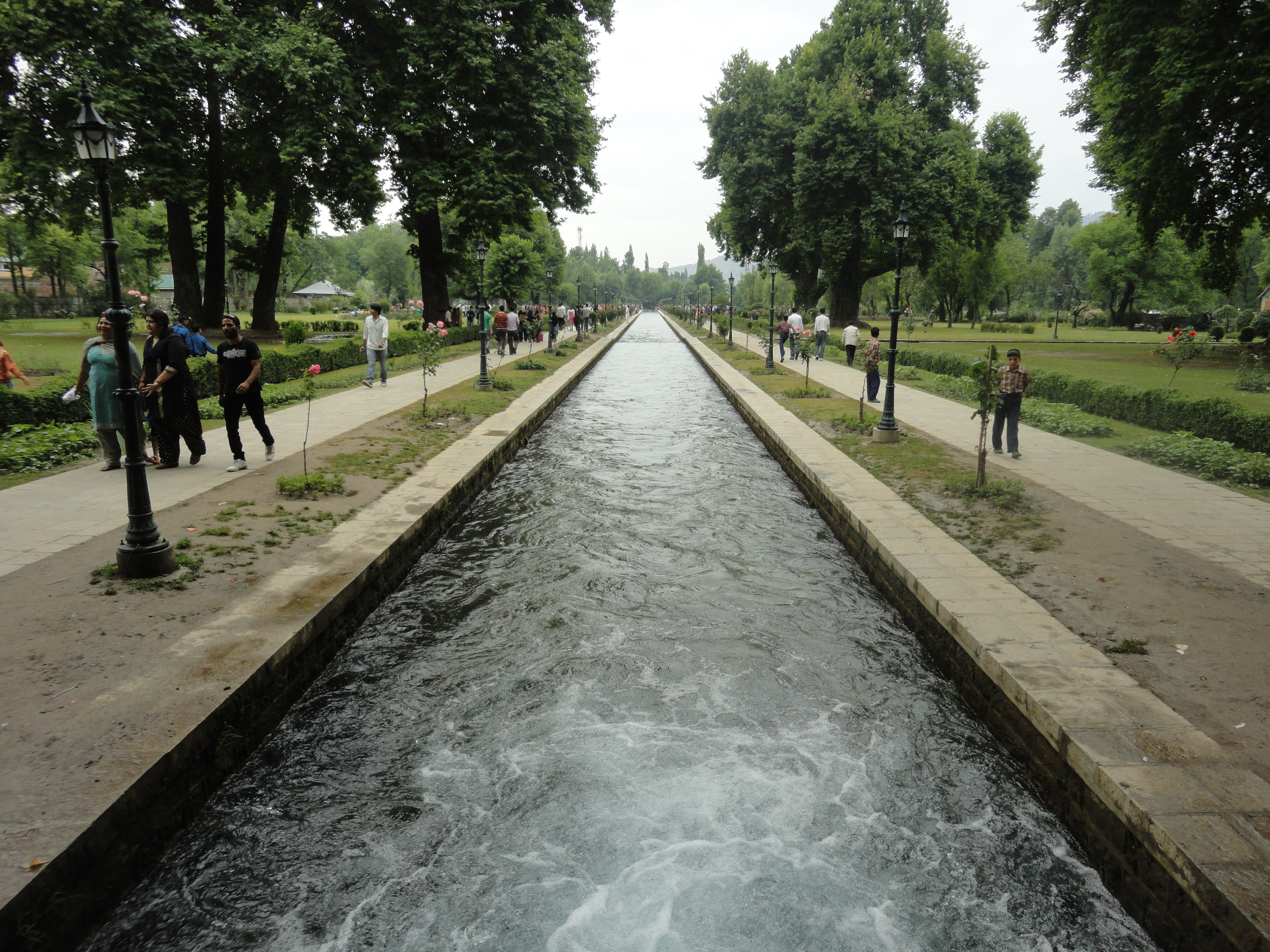
Water canal through Verinag Garden

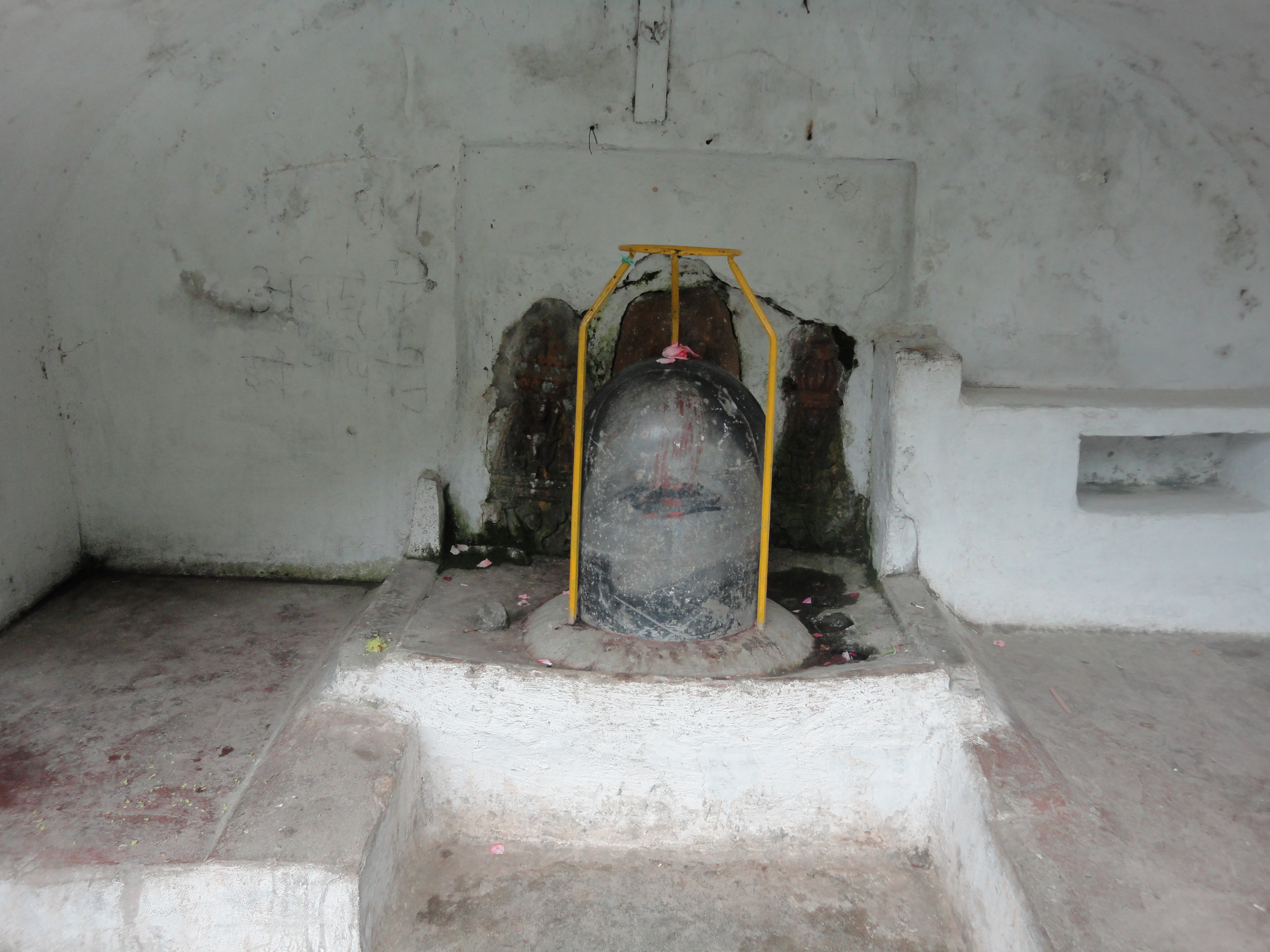
Shivling in an arch around Verinag spring

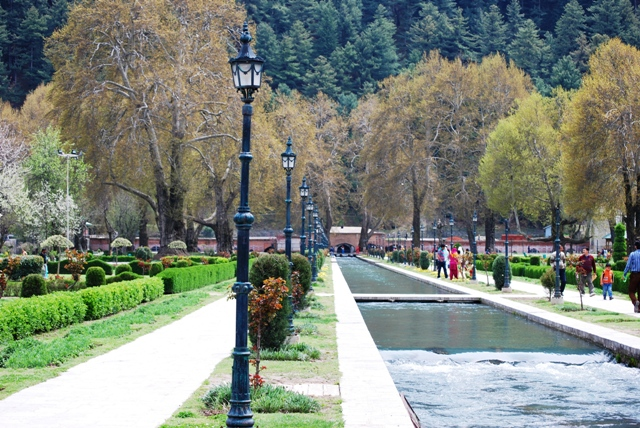
Verinag-The Colors

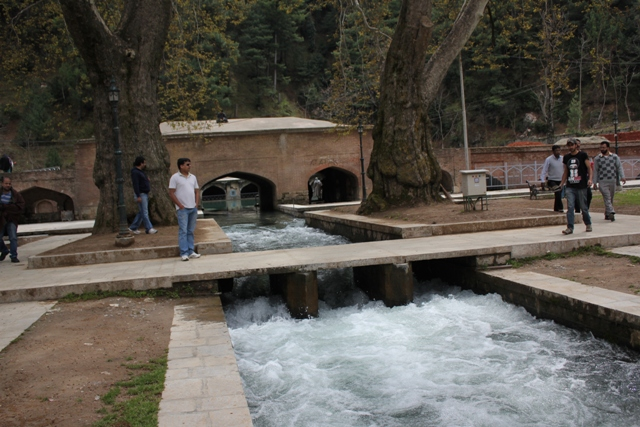
Water gushing out from Verinag Spring

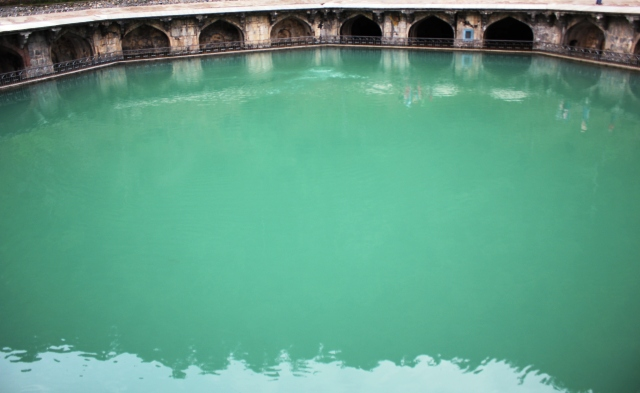
Verinag Spring

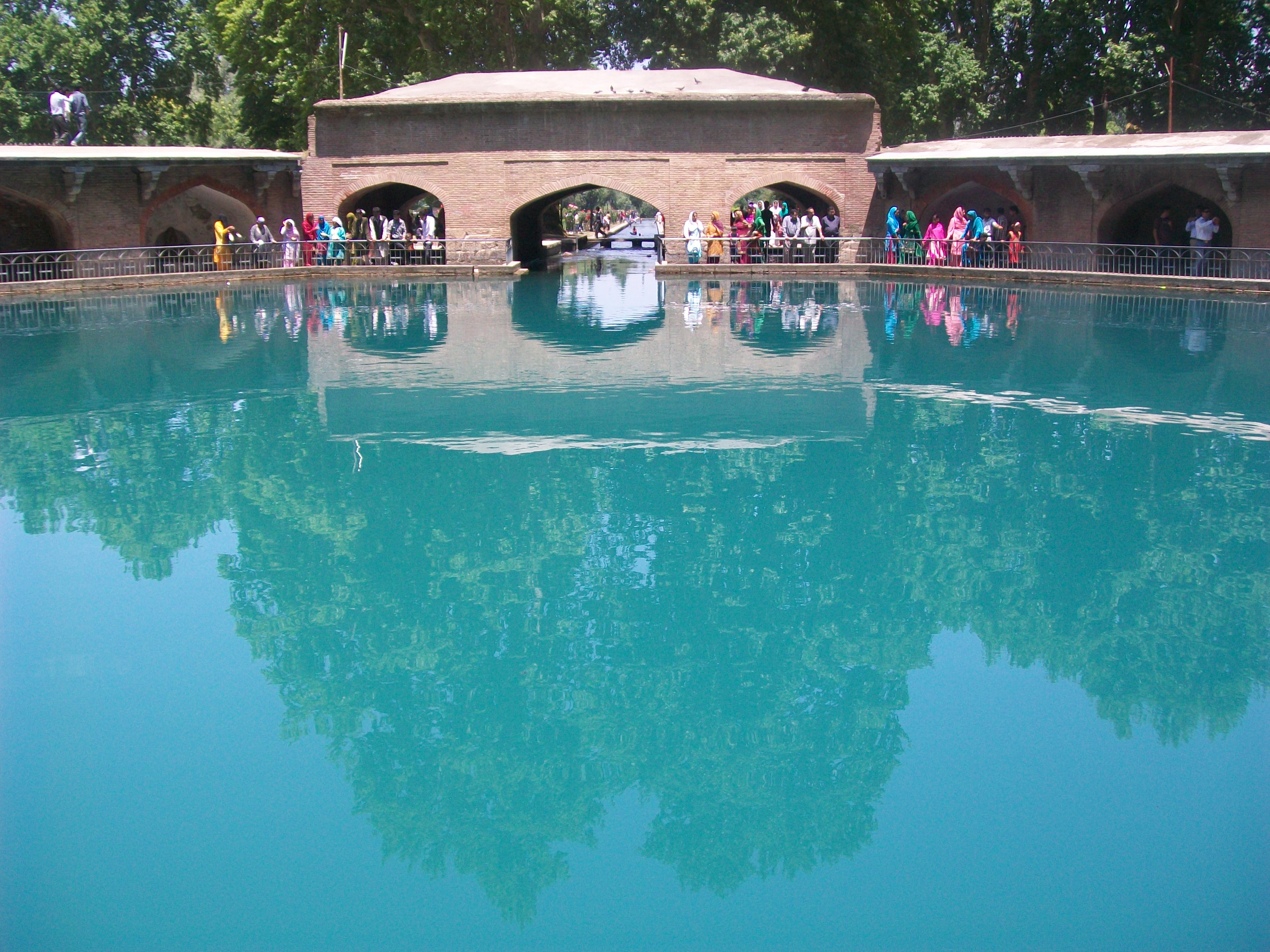

== Geography ==
Verinag is located at 33.55°N 75.25°E. It has an average elevation of 1,851 metres (6,076 feet). This town is located in the vicinity of Banihal pass of Pir Panjal mountain range. Major towns located near this place are Anantnag, Kokernag, Achabal and Qazigund.

== Climate ==
In Verinag, the climate is warm and temperate. There is significant rainfall throughout the year in Verinag. Even the driest month still has a lot of rainfall. According to Köppen climate classification, climate of Verinag is classified as Humid subtropical climate(Cfa). The average annual temperature in Verinag is 13.4 °C (56.1 °F). About 1,043 mm (41.1 in) of precipitation falls annually. The driest month is November with 35 mm (1.4 in) precipitation. Most precipitation falls in March, with an average of 162 mm (6.4 in). The warmest month of the year is July with an average temperature of 22.7 °C (72.9 °F). In January, the average temperature is 1.4 °C (34.5 °F). It is the lowest average temperature of the whole year. The difference in precipitation between the driest month and the wettest month is 127 mm (5.0 in). The average temperatures vary during the year by 21.3 °C (70.3 °F).

Climate data for Verinag
Month	Jan	Feb	Mar	Apr	May	Jun	Jul	Aug	Sep	Oct	Nov	Dec	Year
Mean daily maximum °C (°F)	8 (46)	11 (52)	16 (61)	21 (70)	26 (79)	29 (84)	30 (86)	30 (86)	28 (82)	23 (73)	16 (61)	10 (50)	21 (69)
Daily mean °C (°F)	1.4 (34.5)	3.5 (38.3)	8.4 (47.1)	13.8 (56.8)	18.8 (65.8)	21.8 (71.2)	22.7 (72.9)	22.1 (71.8)	19.7 (67.5)	14.7 (58.5)	9.1 (48.4)	4.6 (40.3)	13.4 (56.1)
Mean daily minimum °C (°F)	−2 (28)	1 (34)	4 (39)	8 (46)	11 (52)	15 (59)	19 (66)	18 (64)	13 (55)	6 (43)	1 (34)	−1 (30)	8 (46)
Average precipitation mm (inches)	128 (5.0)	101 (4.0)	162 (6.4)	130 (5.1)	90 (3.5)	58 (2.3)	78 (3.1)	60 (2.4)	104 (4.1)	39 (1.5)	35 (1.4)	58 (2.3)	1,043 (41.1)
Average rainfall mm (inches)	11.8 (0.46)	28.5 (1.12)	39.6 (1.56)	23.3 (0.92)	21 (0.8)	27 (1.1)	29.8 (1.17)	30.7 (1.21)	2.5 (0.10)	10.7 (0.42)	9.4 (0.37)	13.4 (0.53)	247.7 (9.76)
Average rainy days	5	6	6	6	7	5	6	5	2	4	2	4	58
Source 1: Climate-Data.org for daily mean temperatures and precipitation
Source 2: World Weather Online for monthly average high/low temperatures, rainfall and rainy days

== Transport ==
=== Airport ===
Nearest airport is Srinagar International Airport with scheduled flights from Delhi and Jammu. Srinagar International Airport is 82 km away from Verinag.

=== Road ===
Verinag can be reached by road by taking National Highway 1A between Jammu and Srinagar. It lies at a distance of 6–8 km from National Highway 1A. Verinag Feeder Road Jawahar Tunnel Omoh Road and Lower Munda Verinag Road connect it to National Highway 1A. Verinag is also connected by road to Anantnag and Srinagar. Anantnag is 24 km and Srinagar is 78 km away from Verinag. It Also has a Link to Kokernag Through Batagund Village. Also Verinag is connected with NAVYUGA QAZIGUND TUNNEL by Verinag Qazigund Road Via Sadiwara which is about 6 km of length and easy link.

=== Railway ===
Nearest railway station is Hillar Shahabad on the 119 km long Jammu–Baramulla line that runs from Baramulla to Jammu. It lies at a distance of 5 km from Verinag.

== Demographics ==
As of 2001 India census, Verinag had a population of 16,727. Males constitute 54% of the population and females 46%. Verinag has an average literacy rate of 66%, higher than the national average of 59.5%: male literacy is 70% and, female literacy is 46%. 11% of the population is under six years old. Verinag is divided into 7 wards: Bonagund, Malikpora, Patikhas, Bagwanpora, kanilpora, Chontipora, and Kokagund.

== See also ==
- Kokernag
- River Jehlum
