= Majjhantika =

Buddhist missionary monk during Ashoka's period

Personal life
- Born: Varanasi, India
- Known for: Spreading Buddhism in Kashmir and Gandhara

Religious life
- Religion: Buddhism
- Philosophy: Buddhism

Senior posting
- Teacher: Gautama Buddha

Majjhantika (also known as Madhyantika) was the Indian Buddhist monk of Varanasi who was deputed by Ashoka to spread Buddhism in the regions of Kashmir and Gandhara.

== Early life ==
Majjhantika was born in Varanasi, Uttar Pradesh. He was tasked by Ashoka to travel from Varanasi to Kashmir and Gandhara and spread Buddhism following the Third Buddhist Council which is held in Pataliputra.

== Missionary activity in Kashmir and Gandhara ==
Pali sources detail that Majjhantika was one of the monks sent by Ashoka to cover the Kashmir and Gandhara region. This is also corroborated by the 7th-century monk, Xuanzang. Xuanzang visited this region he noted that most Buddhists belonged to the Sthavira nikāya school which is also the school that Majjhantika belonged to.

== See also ==
- Buddhism in Kashmir
- Culture of Kashmir
- Gandharan Buddhism
- Kashmir Valley
