= Gandharan Buddhism =

Buddhist religion of ancient Gandhara

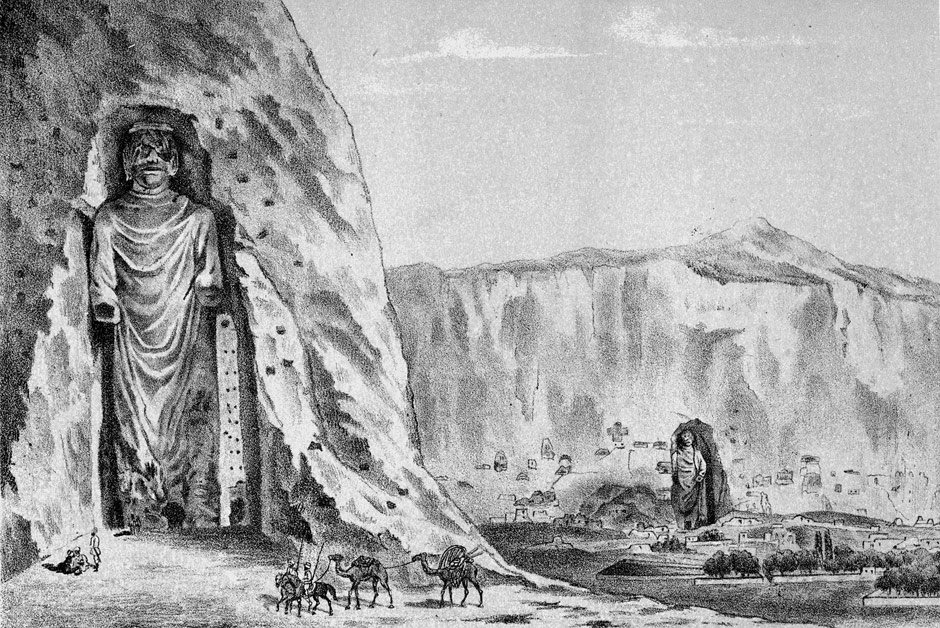
The Buddhas of Bamiyan, an example of late Gandhāran Buddhist monumental sculpture.

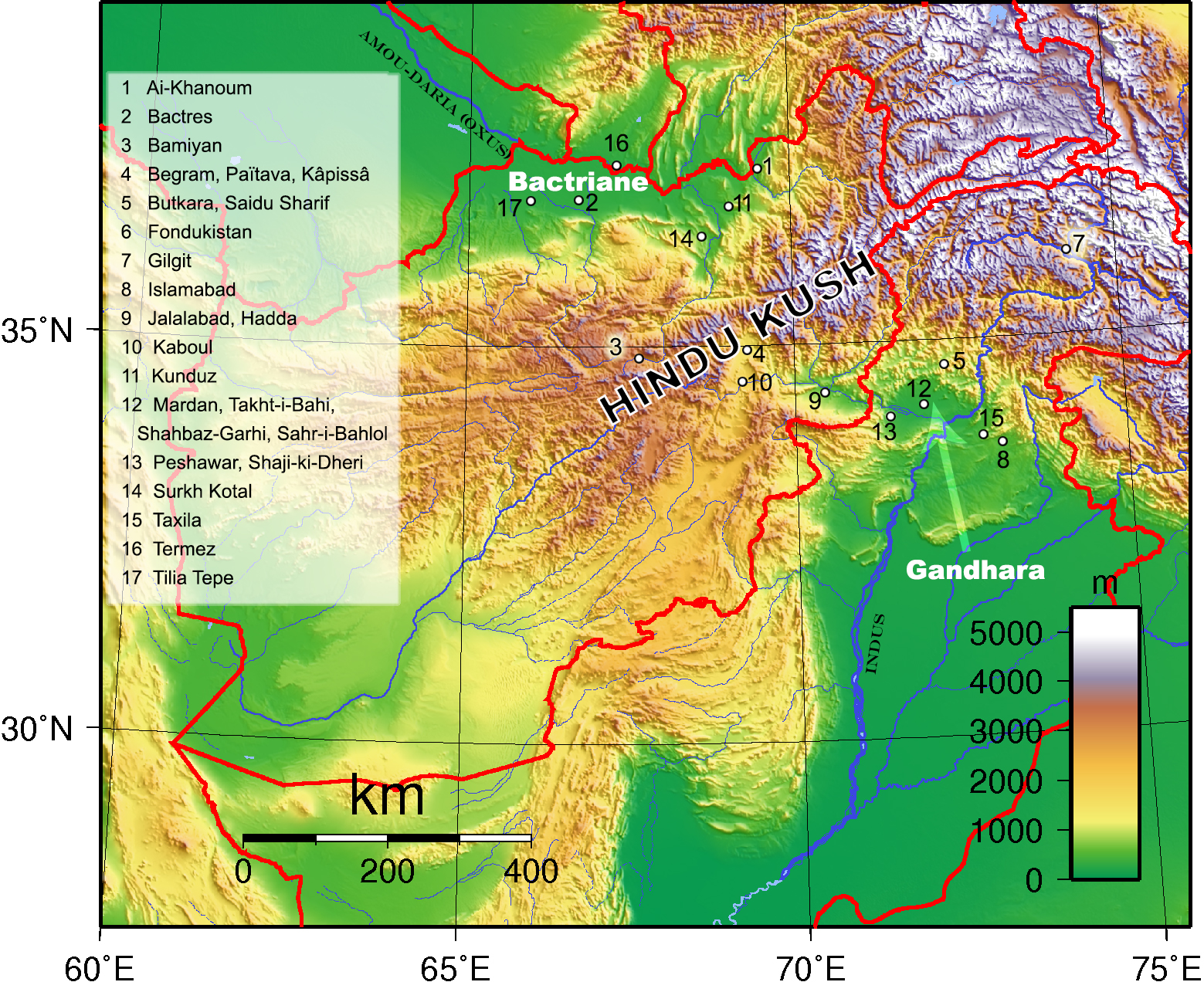
Topographic map of the region showing major Gandhāran and Bactrian sites

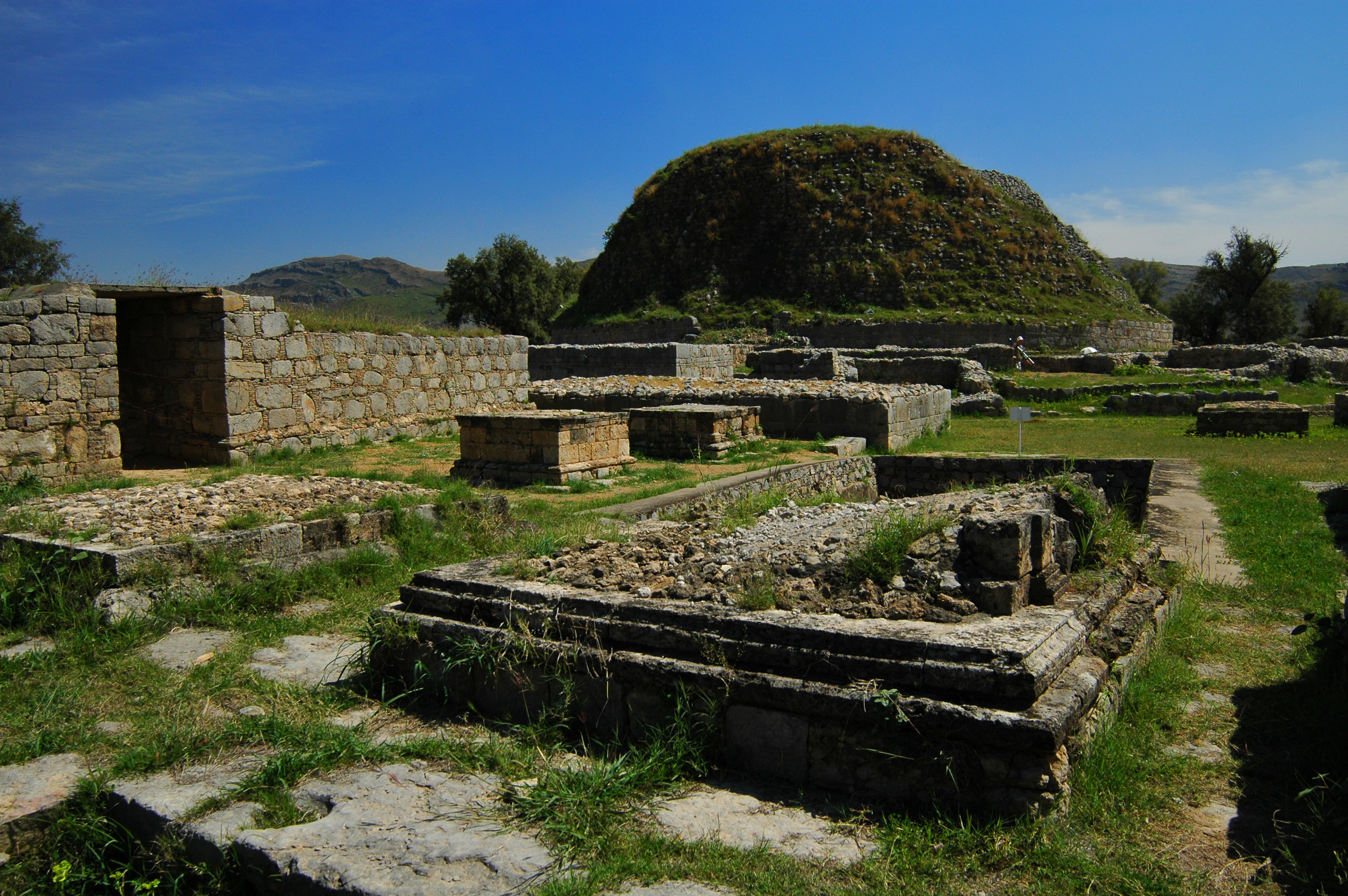
The Dharmarajika Stupa and ruins of surrounding monasteries

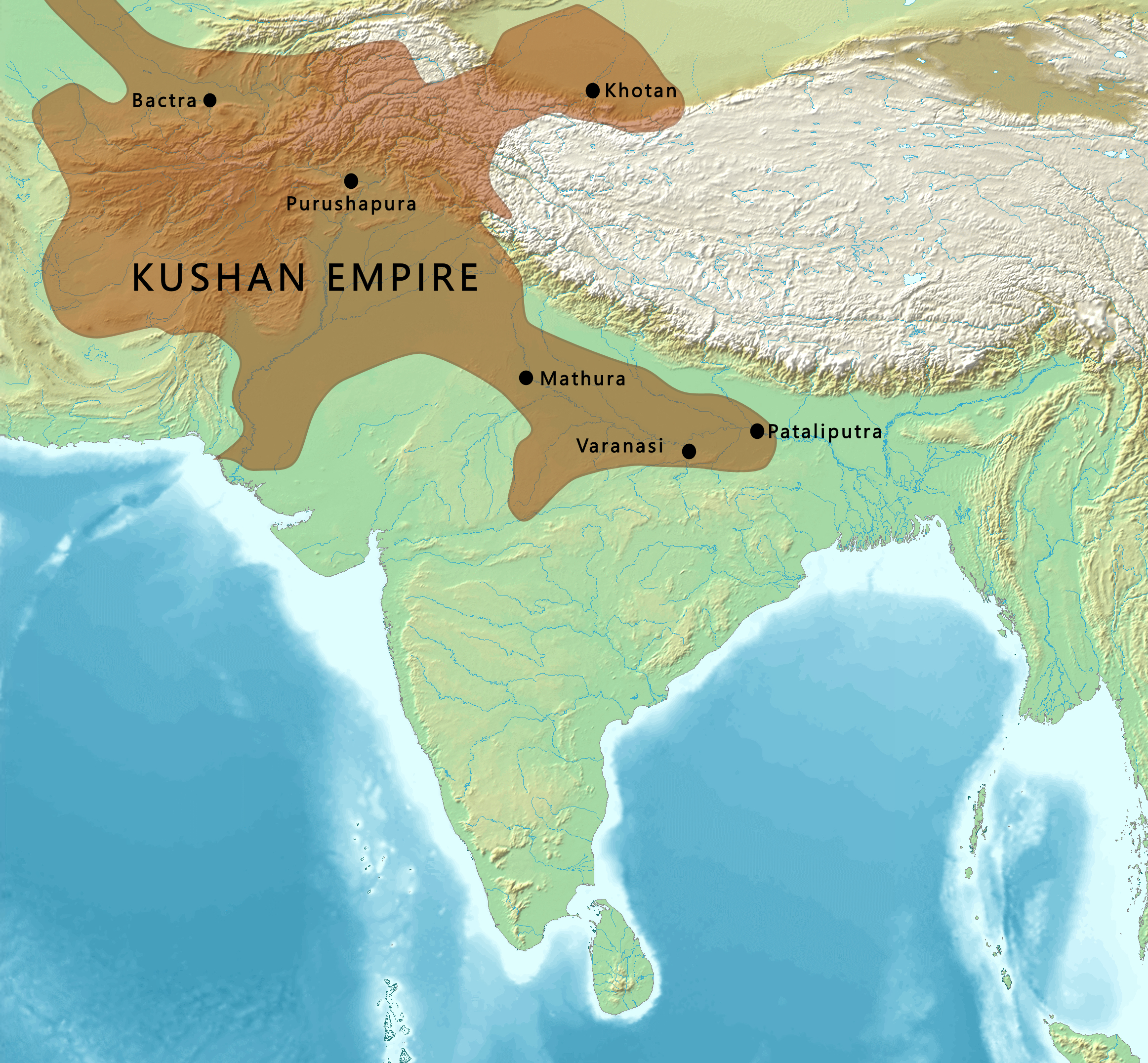
Kushan territories (full line) and maximum extent of Kushan dominions under Kanishka the Great (dotted line), which saw the height of Gandhāran Buddhist expansion.

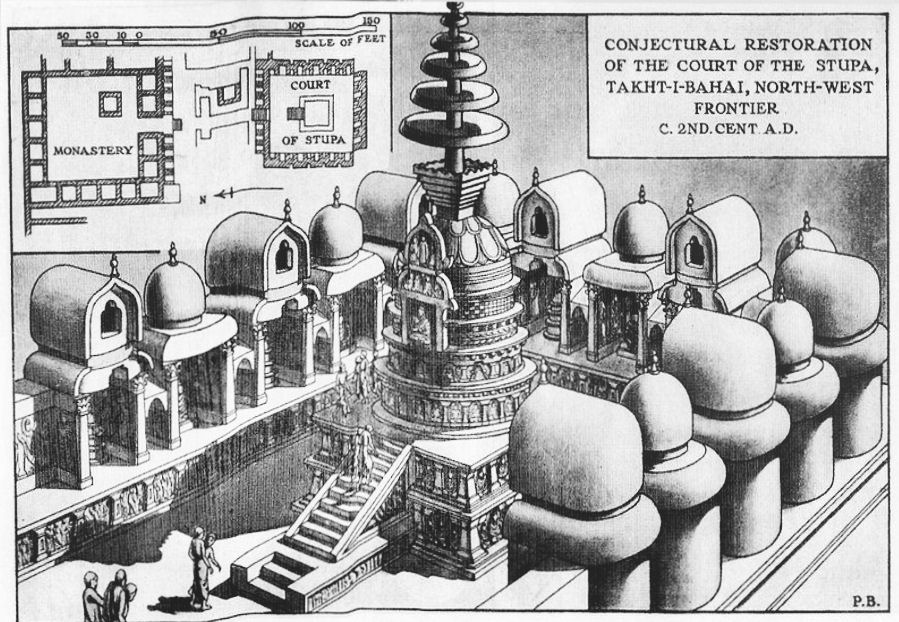
Conjectural restoration of Takht-i-Bahi, a major Buddhist monastery in Mardan, Pakistan

Gandhāran Buddhism was the Buddhist culture of ancient Gandhāra, which was a major center of Buddhism in the northwest of Indian subcontinent from the 3rd century BCE to approximately 1200 CE. Ancient Gandhāra corresponds to modern day north Pakistan, mainly the Peshawar Valley and Potohar Plateau as well as Kabul Valley in Afghanistan. The region has yielded the Gandhāran Buddhist texts written in Gāndhārī Prakrit, the oldest Buddhist manuscripts yet discovered (1st century CE). Gandhāra was also home to a unique Buddhist artistic and architectural culture which blended elements from Indian, Hellenistic, Roman and Parthian art. Buddhist Gandhāra was also influential as the gateway through which Buddhism spread to Central Asia and China.

== Overview ==
Buddhism first took root in Gandhāra 2,300 years ago under the Mauryan emperor Ashoka who sent missionaries to the Kashmira-Gandhāra region following the Third Buddhist council in Pataliputra (modern Patna).

Majjhantika, a monk from the city of Varanasi in India, was assigned by Ashoka to preach in Kashmir and Gandhara. In the view of Buddhist sources, Gandhāra was one of the great regions (mahajanapadas) of ancient India. Under the Mauryan Empire (ca. 300–185 BCE), its capital was the city of Taxila. The center of ancient Gandhāra was the Peshawar basin in northwestern Pakistan which extends westward into Afghanistan along the Kabul River. This region exerted cultural and linguistic influence on what has been called "Greater Gandhāra" which encompasses the surrounding areas eastwards across the Indus River (such as Taxila), north towards the Swat Valley and Upper Indus, west towards Bamiyan and across the Hindu Kush into Bactria and the Oxus river valley.

The Indian emperor Ashoka (ca. 268–233 BCE) erected edicts in the region, some of which use the Gandhārī language and the Kharosthi script later used by Gandhāran Buddhists. These edicts confirm the existence of Buddhism in Gandhāra during his reign. Kharosthi inscriptions have been found as far West as Wardak along the Kabul river, Uzbekistan (Termez) and Tajikistan (Anzhina-Tepe) and as far south as Mohenjo-Daro and Baluchistan.

According to Xuanzang, there were six great stupas founded by Ashoka in Gandhāra, the largest of which is the Dharmarajika Stupa at Taxila. The archaeological and epigraphic evidence points to the first monasteries and stupas dating from the end of the third century BCE. The Indo-Greek Kingdoms later controlled the area, and some of their kings, such as Menander I (ca. 155–130), were seen as promoters of Buddhism in Buddhist sources. The Greek artistic culture strongly influenced the art of Gandhāran Buddhism, which saw the first representations of anthropomorphic Buddhas, with Greco-Buddhist art styles that can be seen in the drapery and hair style. Successive conquerors of the region included the Indo-Scythians and the Indo-Parthians.

The Kushan Empire (30–375 CE) also patronized the Buddhist religion of Gandhāra, supporting monasteries and stupa building. It is not until the 1st and 2nd centuries CE that a significant number of Buddhist centers were founded in Gandhāra. A typical Buddhist center included monasteries adjacent to a central stupa containing relics of the Buddha, which was the central focus of lay and monastic veneration and donations in the forms of sculptural images. Under Kanishka the Great (128–151), Buddhist stupas and monasteries were built in the Gandhāran city of Peshawar (Skt. Purusapura), the capital of the Kushan Empire. The name of Huvishka, Kanishka's successor, was attached to a large monastic complex at Mathura. During this time, sculptures and narrative reliefs were used to embellish Buddhist structures, focusing on the life of Gautama Buddha. The archaeological record shows a dramatic increase in the patronage of Buddhist sites sometime in the 3rd century, with many more images and shrines being added during this period. Most of the extant architecture dates from this period and includes sites such as Taxila and the large monastic institutions like Takht-i-Bahi, Sahri-Bahlol, Jamal Garhi, Ranigat, and Thareli.

The Kushan support of Buddhism and their establishment of secure trade routes from Gandhāra to Asia allowed Buddhism to continue its spread to Bactria, Central Asia and China along the Silk Road. The cult of the Bodhisattva Maitreya was particularly strong during the Kushan Empire, as shown by the abundance of Maitreya images found in Gandhāra. Other major sites from the Kushan period include the Butkara Stupa and Barikot.

Kharosthi inscriptions indicate the existence of the following Buddhist schools in Gandhāra: the Dharmaguptaka, the Mahīśāsaka, the Kasyapiya, the Sarvastivada and the Mahasamghika. Richard Salomon has attributed most of the Gandhāran texts to the Dharmaguptaka school who were a major Buddhist school in the region. During the Chinese pilgrim Faxian's visit to the region, he reported that most monks were practicing non-Mahayana forms of Buddhism. However, there is also plenty of textual and artistic evidence for the existence of Mahayana in Gandhāra.

After the fall of the Kushanas, small kingdoms ruled the area, most friendly to Buddhism, who continued to promote Buddhist stupas and monasteries. Buddhism began to weaken in the region after the second half of the fifth century when the Hephthalite White Huns invaded Gandhāra. After the collapse of Hephthalite rule in the 6th century, Buddhist sites show considerable decline. When the Chinese monk Xuanzang (602–664) visited Taxila and Gandhara, many monasteries were deserted. However, Buddhism continued to thrive in areas outside the Gandhāran core of Peshawar, like in the Swat Valley, Kashmir, and Afghanistan.

Afghanistan's Bamiyan was one of the main cities of Buddhist activity in the region as shown by the remains of the monumental Buddha sculptures known as the Buddhas of Bamiyan. They are believed to have been carved sometime between the 3rd to 6th centuries CE. Bamiyan seems to have continued to be a strong Buddhist site in the 7th century. The Chinese Buddhist pilgrim Xuanzang visited the site in 630 CE, and described Bamiyan as a Buddhist center with "scores of monasteries, and thousands of monks who study the Lokottaravāda".

Another important Gandhāran site in which Buddhism remained strong during the 7th century was the northern city of Gilgit, a key city on the Silk Road which was visited by Chinese pilgrims to study Buddhism. The region was ruled by the Patola Shahi dynasty of the Kingdom of Gilgit in the 600s and 700s, which were adherents of Vajrayana Buddhism. The city later came under the rule of the Tibetan empire until the late 800s.

The religion started its decline after being invaded by the Hephthalites (a.k.a. White Huns) around the middle of the fifth century. They were then replaced by the Hindu Shahis who followed Hinduism although Buddhism continued to flourish.

Xuanzang (602–664) passed through Gandhara and found numerous functioning monasteries. He was followed by Wukong who visited in 753 CE. A Buddhist monk was present in Baramulla in 13th century.

The Muslim invasions of India caused further damage to the Buddhist culture in Gandhāra, and Buddhism eventually ceased to exist from the region by approximately 1200 CE due to various factors.

== Art and architecture ==
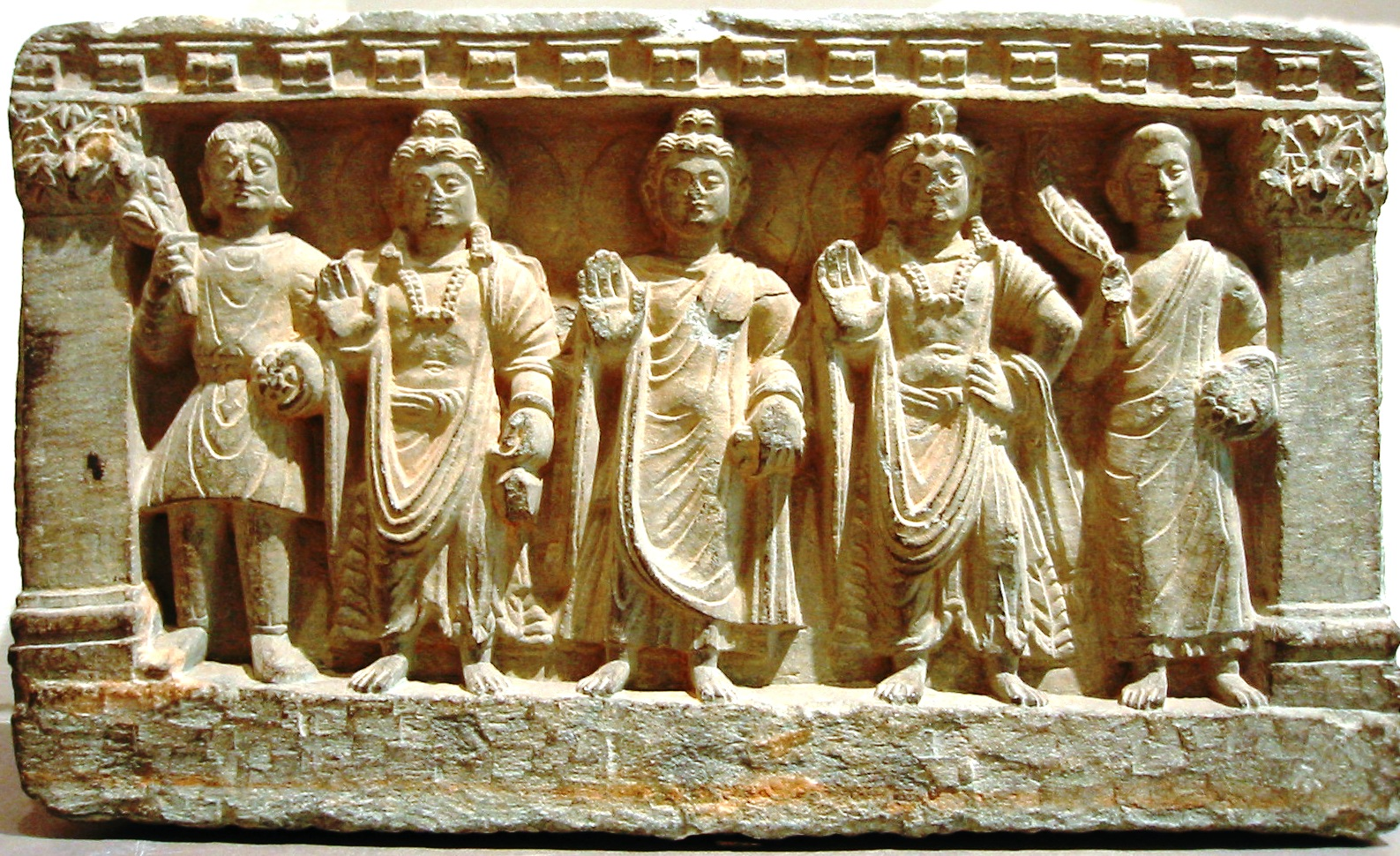
Early Mahayana Buddhist triad. From left to right, a Kushan devotee, Maitreya, the Buddha, Avalokitesvara, and a Buddhist monk. 2nd–3rd century, Gandhara

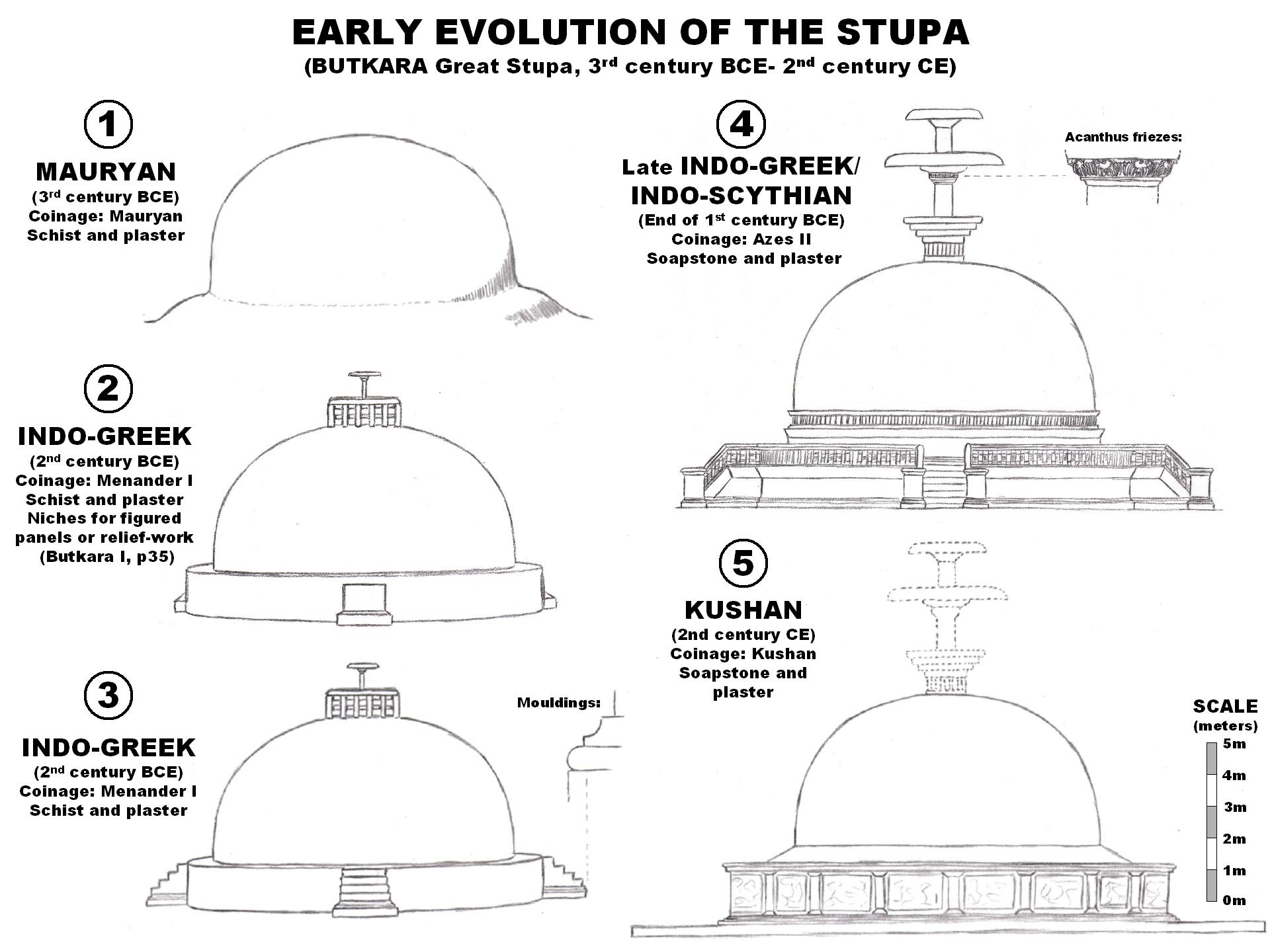
Evolution of the Butkara stupa

Because the region was at a cultural crossroads, the art of the Gandhāran Buddhists was a fusion of Greco-Roman, Iranian and Indian styles. Initially, Buddhist art was aniconic, but Greco-Roman influences led to the emergence of anthropomorphic depictions of the Buddha in the 1st century CE. The height of this artistic style was during the Kushan Empire. Many examples of Gandhāran Buddhist sculpture have been found, showing the influence of Greco-Roman sculpture.

Gandhāran architecture can be divided into four major phases:

- Phase I (ca. 200 BCE – middle 1st century CE), characterized by sacred structures in and around Sirkap, Butkara I and the earliest remains of the Dharmarajika complex. This phase pre-dates the popularization of Buddha images.
- Phase II (ca. middle to late 1st century CE to early 3rd century CE) – Characterized by the expansions of Butkara I and Dharmarajika complex by the addition of stupas, relic shrines and monasteries. Narrative reliefs on the biography of the Buddha are central to this phase, which include anthropomorphic images of the Buddha.
- Phase III (early 3rd century CE to late 5th century CE), a period of great prosperity, the phase I and II sites are enlarged and modified. A focus on devotional images of Buddhas and Bodhisattvas and the shrines to house them can also be seen, and towards the end of this period, monumental imagery appears (some more than 11m high). Stupas became embellished with rows of Buddhas and Bodhisattva statues.
- Phase IV (ca. 5th century to 8th century CE), a poorly understood phase, during which patronage declined and sculptures were moved and reused in the Peshawar basin. Patronage endured in the Swat valley however, and many rock cut Buddha figures were created. Likewise, in Afghanistan, many sculptures were built, including the Buddhas of Bamiyan.

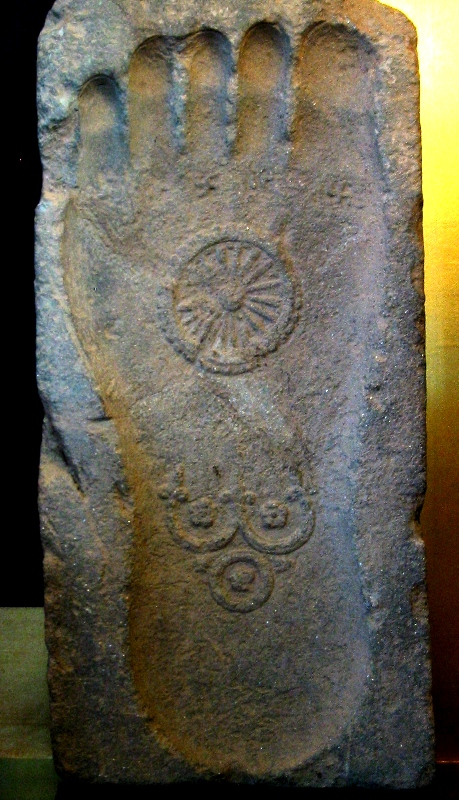
Footprint of the Buddha. 1st century BCE, Gandhara.

== Buddhist texts ==
The Gandhāran Buddhist texts are the oldest Buddhist manuscripts yet discovered (circa 1st century CE). The material is scattered throughout several collections around the world, and is very fragmentary. Most are in the Gandhārī language and the Kharosthi script, on either birchbark manuscripts or palm leaf. Gandhāran manuscripts have been found for all major Buddhist genres including prose sutras, poetry, Abhidharma, Vinaya, Avadana, Commentaries and Mahāyāna texts. Material which parallels Pali Canon texts has been found, such as the Rhinoceros Sutra (Gāndhārī: Khargaviṣaṇa-sutra) and a parallel to the Anattalakkhana Sutta.

Mahāyāna Pure Land sūtras were brought from the Gandhāra region to China as early as AD 147, with the work of Kushan monk Lokakṣema who translated important Mahayana sutras like the Aṣṭasāhasrikā Prajñāpāramitā Sūtra. The earliest of these translations show evidence of having been translated from the Gāndhārī language. The Lokakṣema corpus emphasizes ascetic practices and forest dwelling, and absorption in states of meditative concentration. Some scholars also trace the Mahāyāna Longer Sukhāvatīvyūha Sūtra to the Gandhāra region during the Kushan Empire.

== Influence ==
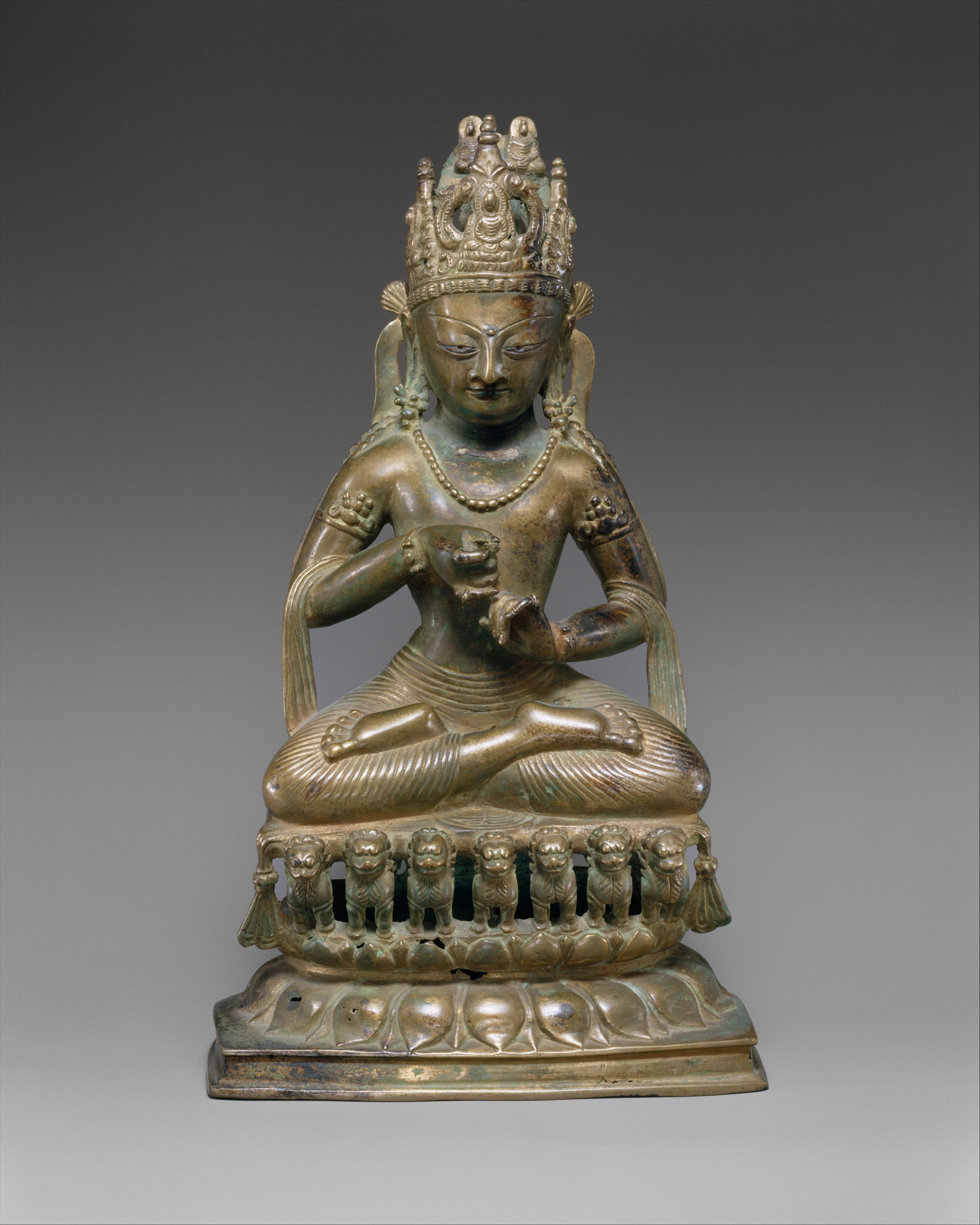
Vairochana statue from Pakistan (possibly Gilgit region), 9th–early 10th century

Due to Gandhāra's position on the Silk Road, Gandhāran Buddhism has a strong influence on the Buddhism of Central Asia and East Asia. During the Greek and Kushan eras, the Khyber Pass was an important trade route and a key highway connected Peshawar with Bactria (and the city of Balkh, or Bactra) through the pass. This was the main route through which Buddhism spread to Central Asia and to China. Greater Gandhāra's Buddhist culture thus extended into the cities of Northern Afghanistan (e.g. Kunduz), South Uzbekistan (e.g. Termez), Turkmenistan (e.g. Merv) Tajikistan and south eastern Kyrgyzstan (in the Chui Valley).

Gandhāran missionaries were influential in bringing Buddhist culture to China during the Han-dynasty (202 BCE–220 CE), through contacts at the towns and cities of the Tarim Basin located in modern Xinjiang, such as Khotan and Turpan. The region was briefly ruled by the Kushans under Kanishka, and this allowed Buddhist missionaries easy access to the towns of the Tarim Basin.

Important Buddhist figures from Greater Gandhāra who acted as translators in China include Lokakṣema, An Shigao, Dharmarakṣa (265–313), Zhi Qian (220–252), Jñānagupta (561–592), and Prajñā (c. 810). Other figures include Padmasambhāva (8th century), considered the Second Buddha by the Nyingma school, and Marananta (4th century), one of the earliest missionaries to spread Buddhism to Korean Peninsula.

Vajrayana Buddhists from the Greater Gandhāran regions of Gilgit and the Swat Valley (which is possibly the widely cited Oḍḍiyāna) were also influential on the establishment of Tibetan Buddhism. Xuanzang notes during his travels to the region (629–645) that he found many Buddhists which were inclined towards Tantric practices. The presence of Tantric Vajrayana Buddhism in the region during the 7th and 8th centuries has been confirmed by recent archaeological finds which includes rock cut sculptures of Avalokiteshvara, Vajrapani and a Vajrayana siddha figure.

== See also ==
- Greco-Buddhism
- Greco-Buddhist art
- Greco-Buddhist monasticism
- Buddhas of Bamyan
- Silk Road transmission of Buddhism
