= Hillar Shahabad =

Hillar Shahabad Hiller Shahabad
- Location in Anantnag, India Hillar Shahabad (India)
- Coordinates: 33.44°N 75.08°E
- Country: India
- Union territory: Jammu and Kashmir
- District: Anantnag

Languages
  - Official: Kashmiri, Urdu, Hindi, Dogri, English
- Time zone: UTC+5:30 (IST)
- 192211: 192211
- Vehicle registration: JK03

Hillar Shahabad is a village in Doru Tehsil in the Anantnag district of Jammu and Kashmir, India.

== Demographics ==
Kashmiri is the local language. People also speak Urdu and English.
