= Nilamata Purana =

Ancient text from Kashmir

The Nilamata Purana (Sanskrit: नीलमत पुराण, romanized: nīlamata purāṇa), also known as the Kasmira Mahatmya, is an ancient text (4th to 8th century CE) from Kashmir which contains information on its history, geography, religion, and folklore. It was used by Kalhana as one of sources of his history.

== Date ==
The dating of the text to 4th to 8th century CE is based on the following reasoning:

"The textual study of the work shows that some philosophical changes had been made in it after the ninth or tenth century A.D. in order to incorporate into it the Kashmiri shaivism. Had the Nilamata been composed after the ninth century A.D. there would have been no scope for such change. The lower limit of the date thus may be eighth century A. D. and the upper one about the sixth century A.D. as Buddha began to be regarded as an incarnation of Visnu from about 550 A.D."

However in recent scholarship the dating of Buddha being regarded as avatar have been challenged and newer research reveals that Buddha began to regarding from 4th century based the fact that Devatishya stotram of Shankarswamin could be dated to the Gupta era. So accordingly the dating of Nilamata Purana's lower limit be adjusted.

According to scholar Ved Kumari Ghai: "If the Rajatarangini is important from the point of view of the political history of 'Kasmira', the Nilamata is no less important for the cultural history of that part of the country." Its critical edition was published in 1924. It is the national epic of Kashmir along with Rajatarangini encompassing modern day regions of modern-day India, Pakistan, Afghanistan, Khorasan, Tajikistan, Modern Dardic regions of world.

== Summary of the contents ==
The Nilamata opens with Janamejaya's inquiry from Vaisampayana as to why the king of Kashmir did not participate in the war of the Mahabharata although his kingdom was not less important than any other in the country. Vaisampayana states that some time before the Mahabharata war was fought, king Gonanda of Kashmir had been invited by his relative Jarasandha to help him in a war against the yadavas. Gonanda complied with his request and was slain on the battlefield by Lord Krishna's brother, Balarama. In order to avenge his father's death, Gonanda's son Damodara went to Gandhara to fight with Krishna who had gone there to attend a Svayamvara. Krishna killed Damodara in the fight but taking into consideration the high sanctity of Kashmir he crowned his rival's pregnant widow Yasovati. Damodara's posthumous son Bala Gonanda was a minor at the time of the great war, so he did not join either the Kauravas or the Pandavas. Vaisampayana points out the importance of Kashmir by referring to its numerous charms and its identification with Uma. He points out further that the valley was originally a lake known as Satisaras. This leads to the question about the origin of 'Kashmir' to which Vaisampayana replies by relating a dialogue held previously between Gonanda and the sage Brahadasva.

Brahadasva gives at first the account of the divisions of time, the destruction of the world at the end of manvantara, the preservation of Manu and the seeds in a ship, the birth of the land and the lake, of Sati, the origin of various tribes from Kashyapa and Vishnu's allotment of Satisaras to the Nagas. Then follows the story of the demon Jalodbbava born in the waters and reared by the Nagas. Having obtained boons from Brahma, the demon began to destroy the descendants of Manu dwelling in the lands of Darvabhisara, Gandbars Jubundura, the Sakas, the Khasas etc. Seeing this devastation, Nila the king of the Nagas approached his father Kashyapa and prayed to him to intercede with the gods to punish the evil-doer and to save the innocent victims. He requested the gods, Brahma, Vishnu and Shiva to do the needful. Vishnu followed by Brahma, Shiva and various other deities, proceeded to Naubandhana to punish the demon. The demon was imperishable in the waters; so Vishnu asked Ananta to make an outlet for the waters by breaking forth the mountain-barriers. He did accordingly. Vishnu then cut off the demon's head with his disc. Now the dry land being available in the valley, Kasyapa expressed the desire that it should be inhabited by the Nagas as well as by the descendants of Manu. The Nagas, however, flatly refused to have Manavas as their co-hahitants. Filled with rage Kasyapa cursed them to live with the Pisacas. At the request of Nila the curse was modified to the extent that the Pisacas would go every year for a period of six months to the sea of sand and the Manavas would live in the land jointly with the Nagas during that period. Vishnu further assured the Nagas that the occupation of Kasmira valley by the Pisacas would last for four ages only.

After the passing away of the four ages, the Manavas, as usual, had gone out for six months. An old Brahmana, Candradeva did not accompany them. Troubled by the Pisacas he approached the Naga King Nila and begged of him to ordain that 'Kasmira' might henceforth be inhabited by Manavas without the fear of emigration. Nila complied with this request on the condition that the Manavas should follow his instructions revealed to him by Kesava. Candradeva lived for six months in the palace of Nila and was initiated into the mysteries of rites or ceremonies prescribed by Nila. In Caitra, when the emigrant population of 'Kasmira' came back, he related the whole incident to Virodaya - king of Manavas. The lengthy dialogue held between Nila and Candradeva describes sixty five rites. ceremonies and festivals many of which are similar to those mentioned in other Puranic works and observed in many parts of India, while a few are peculiar to Kasmira only. At Janamejaya's enquiry as to what Gonanda had asked after listening to the teachings, another dialogue between Gonanda and Brhadasva follows. Gonanda expresses his desire to know the names of the principal Nagas dwelling in Kasmira and Brahadasva enumerates not fewer than six hundred Nagas. He expresses his inability to enumerate all the Nagas, as their number was too great. He further refers to four Nagas, the guardians of directions and relates the story of the Naga Sadangula and the Naga Mahapadma.

== Sacred places ==
Then follows Gonanda's enquiry about the sacred places of Kasmira and Brhadasva's reply referring to various places dedicated to Siva and other deities. Two names Bhutesvara and Kapatesvara raise Gonanda's curiosity which leads Brhadasva to relate Bhutesvara Mahatmya and Kapatesvara Mahatmya. Then follows the enumeration of the sacred places of Visnu and other tirthas situated in the valley of Kasmira. Thereafter is given the eulogy of the river Vitasta and the work ends with the remark that, as this treatise in the form of a dialogue between Janamejaya and Vaisampayana was not useful everywhere (i. e. was of local interest mainly), Vyasa did not include it in the Mahabharata lest that should become too exhaustive.

In Georg Buhler’s words it is a real mine of information regarding the sacred places of Kashmir and legends which are required to explain the Rajatarangini. It is a valuable source of the cultural political life of ancient Kashmir. such as the legend of Satisar lake, the battle between Kasyapa and Nagas and other mythical accounts with the historical names of Gonanda and Queen Yasomati. This legend of lake is also found it Kalhana’s Rajatarangini in the Mahavamsa, the Chinese vinaya of the Mulasarvastivadin sect and in travels of Hiuen Tsang.
