= Gonanda dynasty =

Series of Indian royal dynasties

Gonanda dynasties are ancient Hindu dynasties which ruled Kashmir region.

Gonanda dynasty may refer to:

- Gonanda dynasty (I), Indian dynasty started by Gonanda I
- Gonanditya dynasty (c. 1175 – 167 BCE), Indian dynasty started by Gonanda III
- Gonanda dynasty (II) (c. 25 – 345 CE), Indian dynasty started by Meghavahana
