= List of monarchs of Kashmir =

List of rulers of Jammu and Kashmir region

Maharaja/Sultan of Kashmir
- Imperial
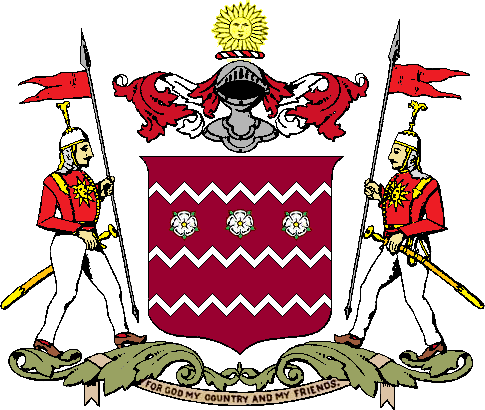
- Emblem of the Princely State of Jammu and Kashmir

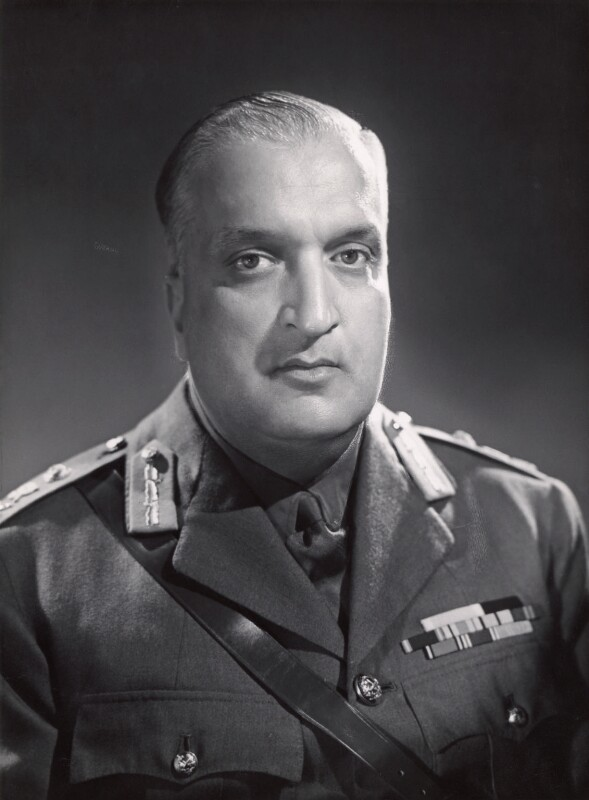
- Last to reign Hari Singh; 23 September 1925 – 17 November 1952

Details
- Style: Maharaja; Sultan; Raja
- First monarch: Maharaja Gonanda I (c. 1400 BCE)
- Last monarch: Hari Singh (1925–1952 CE)
- Formed: c. 1400 BCE
- Abolished: 17 November 1952
- Residences: Amar Mahal Palace; Mubarak Mandi Palace; Hari Niwas Palace; Akhnoor Fort; Pari Mahal; Hari Parbat Fort; Red Fort; Gulab Bhavan; Sher Garhi Palace; Baghsar Fort
- Appointer: Hereditary
- Pretender: Karan Singh

This is a list of the monarchs of Kashmir from the establishment of the Gonanda dynasty around 1400 BCE until the cession of parts of Kashmir State by the Dogra dynasty to Indian Union in 1947 and then officially merging into the Republic of India in 1952.

== Gonanda dynasty ==
=== Gonanda dynasty (I) ===
The total reign of the following kings is mentioned as 1266 years.

Ruler	Notes
Gonanda I	Contemporary of Yudhishthira, a relative of Magadha's ruler Jarasandha (Jarasindhu) (I.59). He was killed by Balarama, the elder brother of Krishna.
Damodara I	Killed in a battle by Krishna.
Yashovati	Wife of Damodara. She was pregnant at the time of her husband's death, and Krishna helped her ascend the throne.
Gonanda II	Son of Yashovati and Damodara. Ruled as a minor over Kashmir, during the Kurukshetra War. Killed by Parikshit.
35 kings (names lost)	A manuscript titled Ratnakar Purana supposedly contained these names, and was translated into Persian by the orders of the later Muslim ruler Zain-ul-Abidin. The purported original manuscript as well as its translation are now lost. A Muslim historian named Hassan is said to have obtained a copy of the translation, and the later Muslim historians provided a fabricated list of 35 names ending in -Khan.Some sources claim that after Gonanda II was killed, Parikshit handed over Kashmir to his second son Harnadeva. This gave rise to the Pandava Dynasty of Kashmir. Harnadeva lost a succession war against Janamejaya, and so he remained the King of Kashmir. The last ruler was Bhagavanta, who was defeated by Lava in 1752 BCE.
Lava	A descendant of Gonanda I, who belonged to the Naga Dynasty and defeated King Bhagavanta of the Pandava Dynasty of Kashmir in 1752 BCE. He laid the foundation of Kashmira Naga Dynasty, a sub-division of the Gonanda Dynasty (I). He established a city named Lolora (Lolab) in Kashmir. According to the Rajatarangini, there were 84 lakh stone-walled houses in it.
Kusheshaya	Son of Lava
Khagendra	Son of Kushyendra
Surendra	Son of Khagendra. Surendra was the first Buddhist king of Kashmir who established the Buddhist culture of Saman culture in Kashmir.
Godhara	Belonged to a different family from Lava's dynasty (I.95)
Suvarna	Known for constructing a canal named Suvarnamani
Janaka	Unsuccessfully invaded Persia
Shachinara	Died childless
Ashoka	Great-grandson of Shakuni and son of Shachinara's first cousin. Built a great city called Srinagara (near but not same as the modern-day Srinagar). In his days, the mlechchhas (foreigners) overran the country, and he took sannyasa. According to Kalhana's account, this Ashoka would have ruled in the 2nd millennium BCE, and was a member of the dynasty founded by Godhara. Kalhana also states that this king had adopted the doctrine of Jina, constructed stupas and Shiva temples, and appeased Bhutesha (Shiva) to obtain his son Jalauka. Despite the discrepancies, multiple scholars identify Kalhana's Ashoka with the Mauryan emperor Ashoka, who adopted Buddhism. Although "Jina" is a term generally associated with Jainism, some ancient sources use it to refer to the Buddha.
Jalauka (Jaloka)	A staunch Shaivite, who constructed several Shiva temples. He rid the country from the mlechchhas (foreigners, possibly Greco-Bactrians).
Damodara II	Devout Shaivite. Built a new city called Damodarasuda, and a dam called Guddasetu.
Hushka, Jushka, and Kanishka	Buddhist kings of Turashka origin (according to Kalhana). The third king is identified with Kanishka of the Kushan Empire.
Abhimanyu I	A Shaivite during whose reigns Buddhists also flourished. Because of the rising Buddhist influence, people stopped following the Shaivite Nāga rites prescribed in the holy text Nilamata Purana. This angered the Nāgas, who heavily persecuted the Buddhists. To avoid this disorder, the king retired. A Brahmin named Chandradeva restored Shaivite rites by worshipping Shiva.

=== Gonanditya dynasty (I) ===
The Gonanda dynasty ruled Kashmir for 1002 years.

Ruler	Reign	Ascension year	Notes
Gonanda III	35 years	1157 BCE	Gonanda III founded a new dynasty. (I.191) He belonged to Rama's lineage, and restored the Nāga rites
Vibhishana I	53 years, 6 months	1122 BCE	
Indrajit	35 years	1069 BCE	
Ravana	30 years, 6 months	1034 BCE	A Shivalinga attributed to Ravana could still be seen at the time of Kalhana.
Vibhishana II	35 years, 6 months	1004 BCE	
Nara I (Kinnara)	40 years, 9 months	968 BCE	His queen eloped with a Buddhist monk, so he destroyed the Buddhist monasteries and gave their land to the Brahmins. He tried to abduct a Nāga woman, who was the wife of a Brahmin. Because of this, the Nāga chief burnt down the king's city, and the king died in the fire.
Siddha	60 years	928 BCE	Siddha, the son of Nara, was saved from Nāga's fury, because he was away from the capital at the time. He was a religious king, and followed a near-ascetic lifestyle.
Utpalaksha	30 years, 6 months	868 BCE	Son of Siddha
Hiranyaksha	37 years, 7 months	837 BCE	Son of Utpalaksha
Hiranyakula	60 years	800 BCE	Son of Hiranyaksha
Vasukula (Mukula)	60 years	740 BCE	Son of Hiranyakula. During his reign, the Mlechchhas (possibly Hunas) overran Kashmir.
Mihirakula	70 years	680 BCE	According to historical evidence, Mihirakula's predecessor was Toramana. Kalhana mentions a king called Toramana, but places him much later, in Book 3. According to Kalhana, Mihirakula was a cruel ruler who ordered killings of a large number of people, including children, women and elders. He invaded the Sinhala Kingdom, and replaced their king with a cruel man. As he passed through Chola, Karnata and other kingdoms on his way back to Kashmir, the rulers of these kingdoms fled their capitals and returned only after he had gone away. On his return to Kashmir, he ordered killings of 100 elephants, who had been startled by the cries of a fallen elephant. Once, Mihirakula dreamt that a particular stone could be moved only by a chaste woman. He put this to test: the women who were unable to move the stone were killed, along with their husbands, sons and brothers. He was supported by some immoral Brahmins. In his old age, the king committed self-immolation.
Vaka (Baka)	63 years, 18 days	610 BCE	A virtuous king, he was seduced and killed by a woman named Vatta, along with several of his sons and grandsons.
Kshitinanda	30 years	547 BCE	The only surviving child of Vaka
Vasunanda	52 years, 2 months	517 BCE	"Originator of the science of love"
Nara II	60 years	465 BCE	Son of Vasunanda
Aksha	60 years	405 BCE	Son of Nara II
Gopaditya	60 years, 6 days	345 BCE	Son of Aksha. Gave lands to Brahmins. Expelled several irreligious Brahmins who used to eat garlic (non-Sattvic diet); in their place, he brought others from foreign countries.
Gokarna	57 years, 11 months	285 BCE	Son of Gopaditya
Narendraditya I (Khingkhila)	36 years, 3 months, 10 days	227 BCE	Son of Gokarna
Yudhisthira I	34 years, 3 months, 1 day	191 BCE	Called "the blind" because of his small eyes. In later years of his reign, he started patronizing unwise persons, and the wise courtiers deserted him. He was deposed by rebellious ministers, and granted asylum by a neighboring king. His descendant Meghavahana later restored the dynasty's rule. Succeeded by Pratapaditya.

=== Other rulers ===
No kings mentioned in this book have been traced in any other historical source. These kings ruled Kashmir for 192 years.

Ruler	Reign	Ascension year	Notes
Pratapaditya I	32 years	157 BCE	Pratapaditya was a relative of a distant king named Vikrmaditya (II.6). This Vikramaditya is not same as the Vikramaditya of Ujjain, who is mentioned later as a patron of Matrigupta.
Jalauka	32 years	125 BCE	Son of Pratapaditya
Tungjina I	36 years	93 BCE	Shared the administration with his queen. The couple sheltered their citizens in the royal palace during a severe famine resulting from heavy frost. After his death, the queen committed sati. The couple died childless.
Vijaya	8 years	57 BCE	From a different dynasty than Tungjina.
Jayendra	37 years	49 BCE	Son of Vijaya: his "long arms reached to his knees". His flatters instigated him against his minister Sandhimati. The minister was persecuted, and ultimately imprisoned because of rumors that he would succeed the king. Sandhimati remained in prison for 10 years. In his old age, the childless king ordered killing of Sandhimati to prevent any chance of him becoming a king. He died after hearing about the false news of Sandhimati's death.
Sandhimati alias Aryaraja	47 years	12 BCE	Sandhimati was selected by the citizens as the new ruler. He ascended the throne reluctantly, at the request of his guru Ishana. He was a devout Shaivite, and his reign was marked by peace. He filled his court with rishis (sages), and spent his time in forest retreats. Therefore, his ministers replaced him with Meghavahana, a descendant of Yudhishthira I. He willingly gave up the throne.

=== Restored Gonandiya dynasty/Gonanda dynasty (II) ===
Ruler	Reign	Ascension year	Notes
Meghavahana	34 years	35 CE	Possible coinage of Meghavahana. Circa 7th century CE, Kashmir. (Note: Obverse: Shiva Pashupati ("Lord of the Beasts"), making a mudra gesture with right hand and holding filleted trident; behind, a lioness or tiger. Trace of legend Meghana... in Brahmi. Reverse: Goddess seated facing on lotus, holding lotus in both hand, Kidara monogram to left, Jaya in Brahmi to right.) Meghavahana was the son of Yudhisthira I's great-grandson, who had been granted asylum by Gopaditya, the king of Gandhara. Meghavahana had been selected the husband of a Vaishnavite princess at a Swayamvara in another kingdom. The ministers of Kashmir brought him to Kashmir after Sandhimati proved to be an unwilling king. Meghavahana banned animal slaughter and compensated those who earned their living through hunting. He patrnozed Brahmins, and set up a monastery. His queens built Buddhist viharas and monasteries. He subdued kings in regions as far as Sinhala Kingdom, forcing them to abandon animal slaughter.
Shreshtasena (Pravarasena I / Tungjina II)	30 years	69 CE	Son of Meghavahana
Hiranya and co-regent Toramana	30 years, 2 months	99 CE	Coin in the name of "Śrī Toramaņa", c. 6th century, Kashmir. Son of Shreshtasena, assisted by his brother and co-regent Toramana. The king imprisoned Toramana, when the latter stuck royal coins in his own name. Toramana's son Pravarasena, who had been brought up in secrecy by his mother Anjana, freed him. Hiranya died childless. Several coins of a king named Toramana have been found in the Kashmir region. This king is identified by some with Huna ruler Toramana, although his successor Mihirakula is placed much earlier by Kalhana.
Matrigupta	4 years, 9 months, 1 day	130 CE	According to Kalhana, the emperor Vikramditya (alias Harsha) of Ujjayini defeated the Shakas, and made his friend and poet Matrigupta the ruler of Kashmir. After Vikramaditya's death, Matrigupta abdicated the throne in favour of Pravarasena. According to D. C. Sircar, Kalhana has confused the legendary Vikramaditya of Ujjain with the Vardhana Emperor Harsha (c. 606–47 CE). The latter is identified with Shiladitya mentioned in Xuanzang's account. However, according to M. A. Stein, Kalhana's Vikramaditya is another Shiladitya mentioned in Xuanzang's account: a king of Malwa around 580 CE.
Pravarasena II	60 years	135 CE	Coinage in the name of "Pravarasena". Circa 6th-early 7th century CE, Kashmir. (Note: Obverse: Standing king with two figured seated below. Name "Pravarasena". Reverse: goddess seated on a lion. Legend "Kidāra".) Historical evidence suggests that a king named Pravarasena ruled Kashmir in the 6th century CE. According to Kalhana, Pravarasena subdued many other kings, in lands as far as Saurashtra. He restored the rule of Vikramaditya's son Pratapshila (alias Shiladitya), who had been expelled from Ujjain by his enemies. Pratapshila agreed to be a vassal of Pravarasena after initial resistance. He founded a city called Pravarapura, which is identified by later historians as the modern city of Srinagar on the basis topographical details.
Yudhishthira II	39 years, 3 months	195 CE	Son of Pravarasena
Narendraditya I (Lakshmana)	13 years	234 CE	Son of Yudhishthira II and Padmavati
Ranaditya I (Tungjina III)	300 years	247 CE	Coinage in the name of "Sri Tujina". Circa 7th century CE, Kashmir. Younger brother of Narendraditya. His queen Ranarambha was an incarnation of Bhramaravasini. The Chola king Ratisena had found her among the waves, during an ocean worship ritual.
Vikramaditya	42 years	547 CE	Son of Ranaditya
Baladitya	36 years, 8 months	589 CE	Younger brother of Vikramaditya. He subdued several enemies. An astrologer prophesied that his son-in-law would succeed him as the king. To avoid this outcome, the king married his daughter Anangalekha to Durlabhavardhana, a handsome but non-royal man from Ashvaghama Kayastha caste.

== Early medieval period ==
=== Karkota dynasty (c. 625–855 CE) ===
List of rulers–

Ruler	Reign	Ascension year
Durlabhavardhana (Prajnaditya)	36 years	625 CE
Durlabhaka (Pratapaditya II)	50 years	661 CE
Chandrapida (Vajraditya I)	8 years, 8 months	712 CE
Tarapida (Udayaditya)	4 years, 24 days	720 CE
Muktapida (Lalitaditya I)	36 years, 7 months, 11 days	724 CE
Kuvalayapida	1 year, 15 days	760 CE
Vajraditya II (Bappiyaka / Vappiyaka / Lalitaditya II)	7 years	761 CE
Prithivyapida I	4 years, 1 month	765 CE
Sangramapida I	7 days	769 CE
Jayapida (Vinayaditya); Jajja	31 years; 3 years	769 CE
Lalitapida	12 years	800 CE
Sangramapida II (Prithivyapida II)	7 years	812 CE
Chippatajayapida (Brhspati / Vrihaspati)	12 years	819 CE
Ajitapida	37 years	831 CE
Anangapida	3 years	868 CE
Utpalapida	2 years	870 CE

=== Utpala dynasty (c. 855–1012 CE) ===
List of rulers–

Ruler	Reign (CE)
Avantivarman	855 – 11 June 883
Shankaravarman	883 – 2/3 February 902
Gopalavarman	2/3 February 902 – 10 February 904
Sankata	904
Sugandha	904–906
Partha	906–921
Nirjitavarman	921–922
Chakravarman	922–933
Shuravarman I	933–934
Partha (2nd reign)	934–935
Chakravarman (2nd reign)	935
Shankaravardhana (or Shambhuvardhana)	935–936
Chakravarman (3rd reign)	936–937
Unmattavanti ("Mad Avanti")	937–939
Shuravarman II	939
Yashaskara-deva	939
Varnata	948
Sangramadeva (Sanggrama I)	948
Parvagupta	948 – 30 June 950
Kshemagupta	30 June 950 – 22 December 958
Abhimanyu II	22 December 958 – 13 October 972
Nandigupta	13 October 972 – 10 November 973
Tribhuvanagupta	10 November 973 – 11 November 975
Bhimagupta	11 November 975 – 980
Didda	980 – 8 August 1003

=== Lohara dynasty (c. 1003–1339) ===
List of rulers–

Ruler	Reign
Sangramaraja (Samgramaraja / Kshamapati)	8 August 1003 – June/July 1028
Hariraja	1028
Ananta-deva	1028–1063
Kalasha (Ranaditya II)	1063 – 12 November 1089
Utkarsha	12 November – 3 December 1089
Harsha	3 December 1089 – 31 August 1101
Uchchala	31 August 1101 – 8 December 1111
Radda	8–9 December 1111
Salhana	9 December 1111 – 1 April 1112
Sussala	1 April 1112 – 13 November 1120 (1st reign)
Bhiksacara	14 November 1120 – 21 May 1121
Sussala	21 May 1121 – 2 February 1128
Jayasimha	1128–1154
Paramanuka	1154–1164
Vantideva	1164–1171
Vuppadeva	1171–1181
Jassaka	1181–1199
Jagadeva	1199–1213
Rājadeva	1213–1235
Samgrāmadeva	1235–1273
Laksmandadeva	1273–1286
Simhadeva	1286–1301
Sūhadeva	1301–1320
Rinchan	13 November 1320 – December 1320 (as Maharaja of Kashmir), December 1320 – 25 November 1323 (as Sultan of Kashmir)
Udayanadeva	1323 CE
Kota Rani	1338–1339 CE

== Late medieval period ==
=== Kashmir Sultanate (c. 1320/1339–1589) ===
==== Bhoti dynasty (c. 1320–1323) ====
No.	Titular Name	Personal Name	Reign
1	Sadr'ud-Din Shah	Rinchan	13 November 1320 – 31 December 1323

==== Shah Mir dynasty (c. 1339–1561 CE) ====
No.	Titular Name	Personal Name	Reign
2	Shamsu'd-Dīn Shāh	Shāh Mīr	4 July 1339 – 6 July 1342
3	Jamshīd Shāh	Jamshīd	6 July 1342 – 6 May 1343
4	Alāu'd-Dīn Shāh	Alī Shēr	6 May 1343 – 19 April 1354
5	Shihābu'd-Dīn Shāh	Shīrashāmak	19 April 1354 – 6 June 1373
6	Qutbu'd-Dīn Shāh	Hindāl	6 June 1373 – 24 August 1389
7	Sikandar Shāh	Shingara	24 August 1389 – 31 May 1413
8	Alī Shāh	Mīr Khān	31 May 1413 – 20 February 1418
9	Zayn al-Abidin	Shāhī Khān	20 February 1418 – December 1419
–	Alī Shāh	Mīr Khān	December 1419 – 7 July 1420
–	Zayn al-Abidin	Shāhī Khān	7 July 1420 – 5 April 1470
10	Haider Shāh	Hāji Khān	5 April 1470 – 13 April 1472
11	Hasan Shāh	Hasan Khān	13 April 1472 – 19 April 1484
12	Muhammad Shāh	Muhammad Khān	19 April 1484 – 14 October 1486
13	Fatēh Shāh	Fatēh Khān	14 October 1486 – July 1493
–	Muhammad Shāh	Muhammad Khān	July 1493 – 1505
–	Fatēh Shāh	Fatēh Khān	1505 – 1514
–	Muhammad Shāh	Muhammad Khān	1514 – September 1515
–	Fatēh Shāh	Fatēh Khān	September 1515 – August 1517
–	Muhammad Shāh	Muhammad Khān	August 1517 – January 1528
14	Ibrahīm Shāh	Ibrahīm Khān	January 1528 – April 1528
15	Nāzuk Shāh	Nādir Shāh	April 1528 – June 1530
–	Muhammad Shāh	Muhammad Khān	June 1530 – July 1537
16	Shamsu'd-Dīn Shāh II	Shamsu'd-Dīn	July 1537 – 1540
17	Ismaīl Shāh	Ismaīl Khān	1540 – December 1540
–	Nāzuk Shāh	Nādir Shāh	December 1540 – December 1552
–	Ibrahīm Shāh	Ibrahīm Khān	December 1552 – 1555
–	Ismaīl Shāh	Ismaīl Khān	1555 – 1557
18	Habīb Shāh	Habīb Khān	1557 – 1561

- NOTE : Muhammad Shah had five separate reigns from 1484 to 1537.

==== Chak dynasty (c. 1561–1579 CE) ====
No.	Titular Name	Personal Name	Reign
19	Muḥammad Humāyūn	Ghazi Shah	1561 – 1563
20	Nasiru'd-Din	Husain Shah	1563 – 1570
21	Zahīru'd-Din Muhammad Alī	Ali Shah	1570 – December 1578
22	Nasiru'd-Din Ghazi	Yousuf Shah	December 1578 – February 1579

==== Baihaqi dynasty (c. 1579 CE) ====
No.	Titular Name	Personal Name	Reign
23	Mubarak Ghazi	Mubarak Baihaqi	February 1579 – November 1579

==== Restored Chak dynasty (c. 1579–1589 CE) ====
No.	Titular Name	Personal Name	Reign
24	Lohar Ghazi	Lohar Khan	November 1579 – November 1580
–	Nasiru'd-Din Ghazi	Yousuf Shah	November 1580 – 14 February 1586
25	Ismā'īl Shah	Yakub Shah	14 February 1586 – 8 August 1589

- NOTE : Yakub Shah was dethroned on 14 October 1586 by the Mughals but continued to use the title of the Sultan of Kashmir till 1589.

== Early modern period ==
=== Mughal Kashmir (c. 1586–1752) ===
- Akbar (1586–1605), Under Akbar's regin Mughal army was finally successful in annexing Kashmir in 1586, robbing its independence and reducing it to the status of a subah (province) of their empire.
- Jahangir (1605–1627)
- Shayarar Mirza (1627 - 1628)
- Shah Jahan I (1628–1657)
- Aurangzeb (1658–1707)
- Muhammad Azam Shah (1707)
- Bahadur Shah I (1707–1712)
- Jahandar Shah (1712–1713)
- Farrukh Siyar (1713–1719)
- Rafi ud Darajat (1719)
- Shah Jahan II (1719)
- Nikusiyar (1719)
- Muhammad Shah (first rule, 1719–1720)
- Muhammad Ibrahim (1720)
- Muhammad Shah (restored) (1720–1748)
- Ahmad Shah Bahadur (1748–1752), last Mughal to rule Kashmir.

=== Durrani Empire (c. 1752–1754 CE) ===
Name	Lifespan	Reign start	Reign end	Notes	Family	Image
Ahmad Shah Durrani	1720/1722 – 4 June 1772	1752	1754	Established the Durrani dynasty and the Durrani Empire	Durrani	

=== Raja of Kashmir (c. 1754–1762 CE) ===
Titular Name(s)	Personal Name	Reign
Raja Jiwan	Sukh Jiwan Mal Sahni	1754–1762

=== Durrani Empire (restored) (c. 1762–1819 CE) ===
Name	Lifespan	Reign start	Reign end	Notes	Family	Image
Ahmad Shah Durrani	1720/1722 – 4 June 1772	1762	4 June 1772		Durrani	Ahmad Shah Durrani of Afghanistan
Timur Shah Durrani	December 1746 – 20 May 1793	November 1772	20 May 1793		Durrani	Timur Shah Durrani of Afghanistan
Zaman Shah Durrani	1770–1844	20 May 1793	25 July 1801 (deposed)		Durrani	Zaman Shah Durrani of Afghanistan
Mahmud Shah Durrani	1769 – 18 April 1829	25 July 1801	13 July 1803 (deposed)		Durrani	Mahmud Shah Durrani of Afghanistan
Shah Shujah Durrani	4 November 1785 – 5 April 1842	13 July 1803	3 May 1809 (deposed)		Durrani	Shah Shujah Durrani of Afghanistan
Mahmud Shah Durrani (2nd reign)	1769 – 18 April 1829	3 May 1809	1818 (deposed)		Durrani	Mahmud Shah Durrani of Afghanistan
Ali Shah Durrani	unknown	1818	1819 (deposed)		Durrani	Ali Shah Durrani of Afghanistan

== Modern period ==
=== Sikh Empire (c. 1819–1846 CE) ===
The nominal and acting governors of Kashmir during Sikh-rule and their tenures are as follows:

- Diwan Moti Ram (1st term), end of 1819 – 1820
- Hari Singh Nalwa, 1820–1821
- Diwan Moti Ram (2nd term), December 1821 – spring of 1825
  - Gurmak Singh, 1825 (acting governor)
- Diwan Chuni Lal, 1825 – end of 1826
- Diwan Kirpa Ram, early 1827 – 1830
- Maha Singh, 1830 (governor for one month after Kirpa Ram)
- Bhima Singh Ardali, summer 1830 – 1831
- Kanwar Sher Singh, 1831–1834
  - Diwan Vesaka Singh, 1831–1832 (acting governor on behalf of Sher Singh)
  - Shaikh Gholam Muhyi Addin & Jamadar Kushal Singh, 1832–1834 (acting governors for Sher Singh)
- Mihan Singh Kumedan, July 1834 – 17 April 1841
- Shaikh Gholam Muhyi Addin, April 1841 – 1845
- Shaikh Imam-ud-Din, 1845 – November 1846

=== State of Jammu and Kashmir (c. 1846–1952 CE) ===
Ruler	Portrait	Reign
Maharaja Gulab Singh		16 March 1846 – 20 February 1856
Maharaja Ranbir Singh		20 February 1856 – 12 September 1885
Maharaja Pratap Singh		12 September 1885 – 23 September 1925
Maharaja Hari Singh		12 September 1925 – 17 November 1952 (Note: Monarchy abolished.)

== See also ==
- List of Indian monarchs
- History of Kashmir
- Martand Sun Temple
- Lalitaditya Muktapida
- Rajatarangini & Kalhan
- Gonanda dynasty
