= Fateh Shah Miri =

Fateh Shah
- Sultan of Kashmir
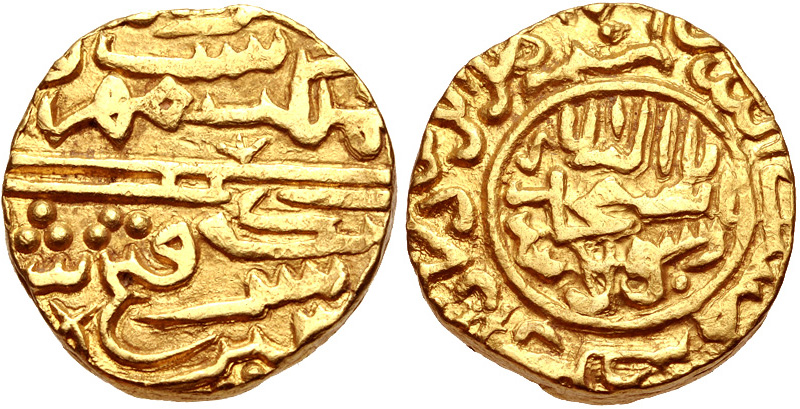
- Gold dinar of Fateh Shah

Sultan of Kashmir
- 1st Reign: 14 October 1486 – July 1493
- Coronation: 1486
- Predecessor: Muhammad Shah
- Successor: Muhammad Shah
- 2nd Reign: 1505 – 1514
- Predecessor: Muhammad Shah
- Successor: Muhammad Shah
- 3rd Reign: September 1515 – August 1517
- Predecessor: Muhammad Shah
- Successor: Muhammad Shah
- Born: Srinagar, Kashmir Sultanate (Srinagar, Jammu and Kashmir, India)
- Died: August 1517; Srinagar, Kashmir Sultanate (Srinagar, Jammu and Kashmir, India)
- Issue: Sikandar Khan; Habib Khan (d.1522); Nazuk Shah
Names
- Fateh Shah Miri
- Dynasty: Shah Miri
- Father: Adham Khan, oldest son of Zayn al-Abidin the Great
- Religion: Sunni Islam

Fateh Shah Miri, or simply Fateh Shah was the 13th Sultan of the Shah Mir dynasty of Kashmir Sultanate. Fateh was the son of Adham Khan, the oldest son of Zayn al-Abidin the Great. His father was killed by his uncle Haji Khan, who took the throne as Haider Shah. After Haider Shah, his son Hasan Shah ruled till his death in 1484, leaving a minor son Muhammad Shah on the throne. As a result, some Kashmiri noble invited Fateh, who was living at Jalandhar after his father's death, to take the throne of Kashmir, which he did in 1486 CE.

Muhammad Shah regained the throne in 1493 but Fateh soon retook it in 1505 after defeating Muhammad Shah in a battle near Kupwara. Fateh Shah reconstructed the towns of Pulwama and Anantnag. In 1514, he lost his throne again to Muhammad Shah but retook after just a year. Fateh Shah ruled for a total of 18 years from 1486 to 1517. He died in 1517 with the throne being passed over to Muhammad Shah again. His sons Sikandar and Habib both tried to retake their father's throne but were unsuccessful. However, Fateh's younger son, Nazuk Khan managed to seize the throne in 1529 as Nader Shah, before being deposed by Muhammad Shah.
