= Kuttanimata =

Late 8th-century Sanskrit verse work

Kuṭṭanīmata
- कुट्टनीमतम्
- Original title: Kuṭṭanīmata
- Author(s): Dāmodaragupta
- Language: Sanskrit
- Date: Late 8th century
- Provenance: Kashmir
- State of existence: Extant
- First printed edition: Modern critical editions; see bibliography
- Genre: Kāvya, satirical poetry, didactic literature
- Verse form: Sanskrit verse
- Subject: Courtesan culture, erotic strategy, urban life, social satire
- Setting: Early medieval Kashmir and northern India

Kuṭṭanīmata (कुट्टनीमतम्; also transliterated Kuttanimata or Kuṭṭanī-mata; translated as The Bawd's Counsel) is a late 8th-century Sanskrit verse work attributed to Dāmodaragupta, a poet associated with the court of Jayāpīḍa of Kashmir. Modern scholarship variously describes it as a work of kāvya, a satirical and didactic poem, and a "verse novel".

The work is notable both as a literary composition and as a historical source. Although framed as the advice of an experienced bawd to a younger courtesan, it has been widely used by historians for evidence on social life, court culture, religion, gender relations, performance, and material culture in early medieval Kashmir and northern India.

== Authorship ==
The poem is traditionally attributed to Dāmodaragupta, whom modern scholars connect with the court of Jayāpīḍa of the Karkota dynasty. A. M. Shastri argued that the internal and external evidence allows the work to be dated with unusual confidence within classical Sanskrit literature, placing it in the milieu of late 8th-century Kashmir. Modern scholarship likewise describes the text as an eighth-century work.

== Content and analysis ==
The Kuṭṭanīmata is framed as the counsel of the bawd Vikarālā to the courtesan Mālatī. Much of the work unfolds through embedded narratives and cautionary examples, including stories centred on the courtesans Mañjarī and Hāralatā. The poem's didactic surface is combined with extended narrative development, social observation, and satire.

Although the poem is often placed near the Kāmaśāstra tradition because of its subject matter, scholars have stressed that it is not simply a manual on erotics. Shastri described it as a literary work whose ostensible concern with prostitution opens onto much broader questions of urban life and social conduct. Bronner, reviewing the modern edition and translation, likewise described it as a sophisticated narrative composition rather than a narrowly technical text.

Recurring themes in the poem include the economics of desire, emotional discipline, deception, performance, and the relation between affection and material exchange. Schramm used the Kuṭṭanīmata in discussing Indian musical theatre, particularly for its description of a performance of Ratnāvalī.

The textual history of the Kuṭṭanīmata is complex. Gyula Wojtilla noted that the external evidence for the poem includes quotations preserved in Sanskrit anthologies and works on poetics and rhetoric, in addition to the manuscript tradition used by modern editors. Wojtilla further observed that several editorial problems remain unresolved, including a well-known crux in verses 940–947.

== Bibliography ==
- Dezső, Csaba; Goodall, Dominic (2012). Dāmodaraguptaviracitaṃ Kuṭṭanīmatam = The Bawd's Counsel: Being an Eighth-Century Verse Novel in Sanskrit by Dāmodaragupta. Newly edited and translated into English. Groningen Oriental Studies. Vol. 23. Groningen: Egbert Forsten. ISBN 9789069801582.
- Bronner, Yigal (2015). "Csaba Dezső and Dominic Goodall (editors and translators), Dāmodaraguptaviracitaṃ Kuṭṭanīmatam = The Bawd's Counsel: Being an Eighth-Century Verse Novel in Sanskrit by Dāmodaragupta. Newly edited and translated into English". Indo-Iranian Journal. 58 (1): 79–86. doi:10.1163/15728536-05800002.
- Ray, Sunil Chandra (1957). "Dāmodaragupta's Kuṭṭanīmata: Its Value as a Source of Ancient Indian History". Proceedings of the Indian History Congress. 20: 144–148. JSTOR 44304455.
- Schramm, Harold (Winter 1968–1969). "Musical Theatre in India". Asian Music. 1 (1): 31–40. doi:10.2307/834008. JSTOR 834008.
- Shastri, A. M. (1996). India as Seen in the Kuttanimata of Damodara Gupta. Motilal Banarsidass. ISBN 9788120813366.
- Wojtilla, Gyula (2002). "Materials for a Critical Edition of the Kuṭṭanīmata". Wiener Zeitschrift für die Kunde Südasiens / Vienna Journal of South Asian Studies. 46: 135–145. JSTOR 24007686.
