= Meghavahana =

King of Kashmir from 25 to 59 CE

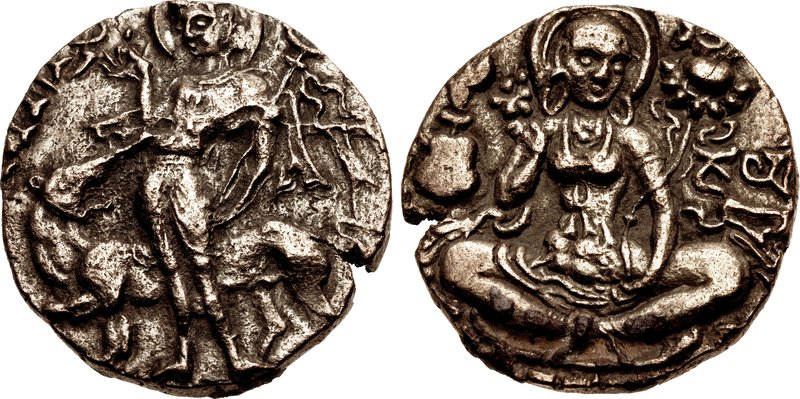
- Possible coinage of Meghavahana. Obverse: Shiva Pashupati ("Lord of the Beasts"), making a mudra gesture with right hand and holding filleted trident; behind, a lioness or tiger. Trace of legend Meghana... in Brahmi. Reverse: Goddess seated facing on lotus, holding lotus in both hand, Kidara monogram to left, Jaya in Brahmi to right. Circa 7th century CE, Kashmir.

King of Kashmir
- Reign: 25–59 CE
- Predecessor: Sandhimati
- Successor: Pravarasena
- Issue: Pravarasena
- Dynasty: Gonanda
- Father: Gopaditya

Meghavahana (died 59 CE) was the founder of the second Gonanda dynasty and the ruler of Kashmir from 25 CE until his death in 59 CE. Meghavahana was 80th ruler of the Gonanda line of rulers, he was followed by 81st ruler Pravarasena (also known as Sresthasena and Tuneena).

== Personal life ==
Meghavahana, the first prince of the restored dynasty, is said to have been the son of Gopaditya, a great-grandson of Yudhishthira, living in exile at the court of the king of Gandhara. Meghavahana, who is supposed to have taken possession of the throne of his forefathers at the invitation of the Kashmirian ministers, is described as a strong but pious ruler. He married Amritaprabha, daughter of the king Bala Varman of Kamarupa. His son and successor is S'resthasena.

== Tenure ==
Various acts attributed to him, like the prohibition of the killing of animals, even in sacrifices and the building of numerous Viharas by his court seem to show Meghavahana in the light of a patron of Buddhism. Apart from several legendary anecdotes which are intended to illustrate the spiritual greatness of the king and his command of supernatural powers acquired thereby, Kalhana relates of him a digvijaya or conquest of the world. Meghavahana is supposed to have undertaken it in order to impose his prohibition of slaughter on the whole earth. It needs scarcely to be demonstrated that no historical value can attach to the record of such fabulous conquests. The report of Meghavahana having come from Gandhara acquires significance in view of the unmistakable numismatic evidence which points to Kashmir having been founded by Amritaprabha, Meghavahana's queen, was known already to On-kong. The attribution of a Stupa known by a Tibetan designation (Loh-Stoupa) to the Guru of this foreign queen, seems also to rest on genuine tradition. Of Meghavahana 's son and successor S'resthasena, who is said to have borne also the names of Pravarasena and Tunjina, built various sacred structures at Puranadhisthana, the old capital, the site of which is marked by the modern Pandrethan. S'resthasena is said to have two sons, of which the elder, Hiranya, succeeded him, while the other, Toramana of Kashmir, acted as Yuvaraja. Toramana strike large number of coins in his name.

== See also ==
- Dynasties of Ancient Kashmir
- Harsha of Kashmir
- Rajatarangini
