= Muhammad Shah Mir =

Sultan of Kashmir (r. 1484–1486, 1493–1505, 1514–1515, 1517–1528, 1530–1537)

Muhammad Shah محمد شاہ
- Sultan of Kashmir; Shah
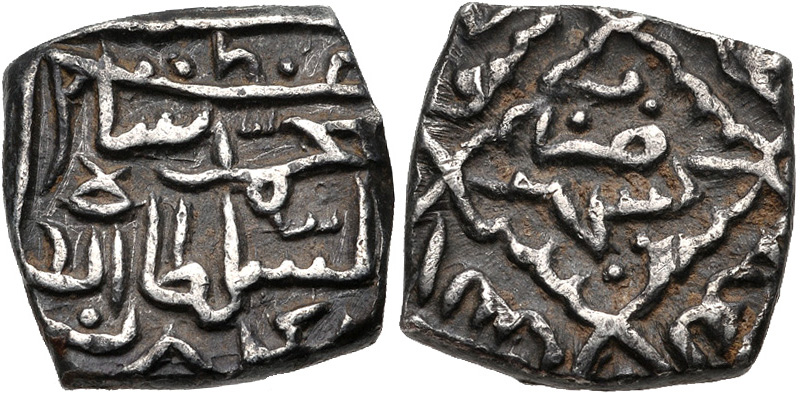
- Coinage of Muhammad Shah, c. 1484

12th Sultan of Kashmir
- Reign: 19 April 1484 – 14 October 1486
- Coronation: 1484
- Predecessor: Hasan Shah
- Successor: Fateh Shah
- Reign: July 1493 – 1505
- Predecessor: Fateh Shah
- Successor: Fateh Shah
- Reign: 1514 – September 1515
- Predecessor: Fateh Shah
- Successor: Fateh Shah
- Reign: August 1517 – January 1528
- Predecessor: Fateh Shah
- Successor: Ibrahim Shah
- Reign: June 1530 – July 1537
- Predecessor: Nadir Shah
- Successor: Shamsu'd-Din II
- Born: 1477; Kashmir, Shah-Mir Sultanate
- Died: July 1537 (aged 59–60); Kashmir, Shah-Mir Sultanate
- Burial: Kashmir
Names
- Muhammad Shah Mir
- Dynasty: Shah Mir
- Father: Hasan Shah
- Religion: Sunni Islam

Muhammad Shah Mir (Kashmiri: محمد شاہ میر; 1450s – July 1537), also simply known as Muhammad Shah (Kashmiri: محمد شاہ), was a member of the Shah Mir dynasty who served as the 12th Sultan of Kashmir.

== Life ==
Muhammad Shah was the member of Shah-Mir dynasty, the powerful dynasty of Kashmir. He was the son of Hasan Shah, the previous sultan, and was born in 1477. He succeeded his father at the age of seven on 19 April 1484, and his maternal grandfather, Sayyid Hasan was appointed as regent. Muhammad Shah had five separate reigns from 1484 to 1537.

He was succeeded by his cousin Fath Shah three times. He was succeeded by Ibrahim Shah after his fourth reign ended. He was succeeded by Sultan Shams-ud-Din after his death.
