= Karkota dynasty =

625 – 855 CE dynasty of Kashmir and neighbouring areas

- 625–855
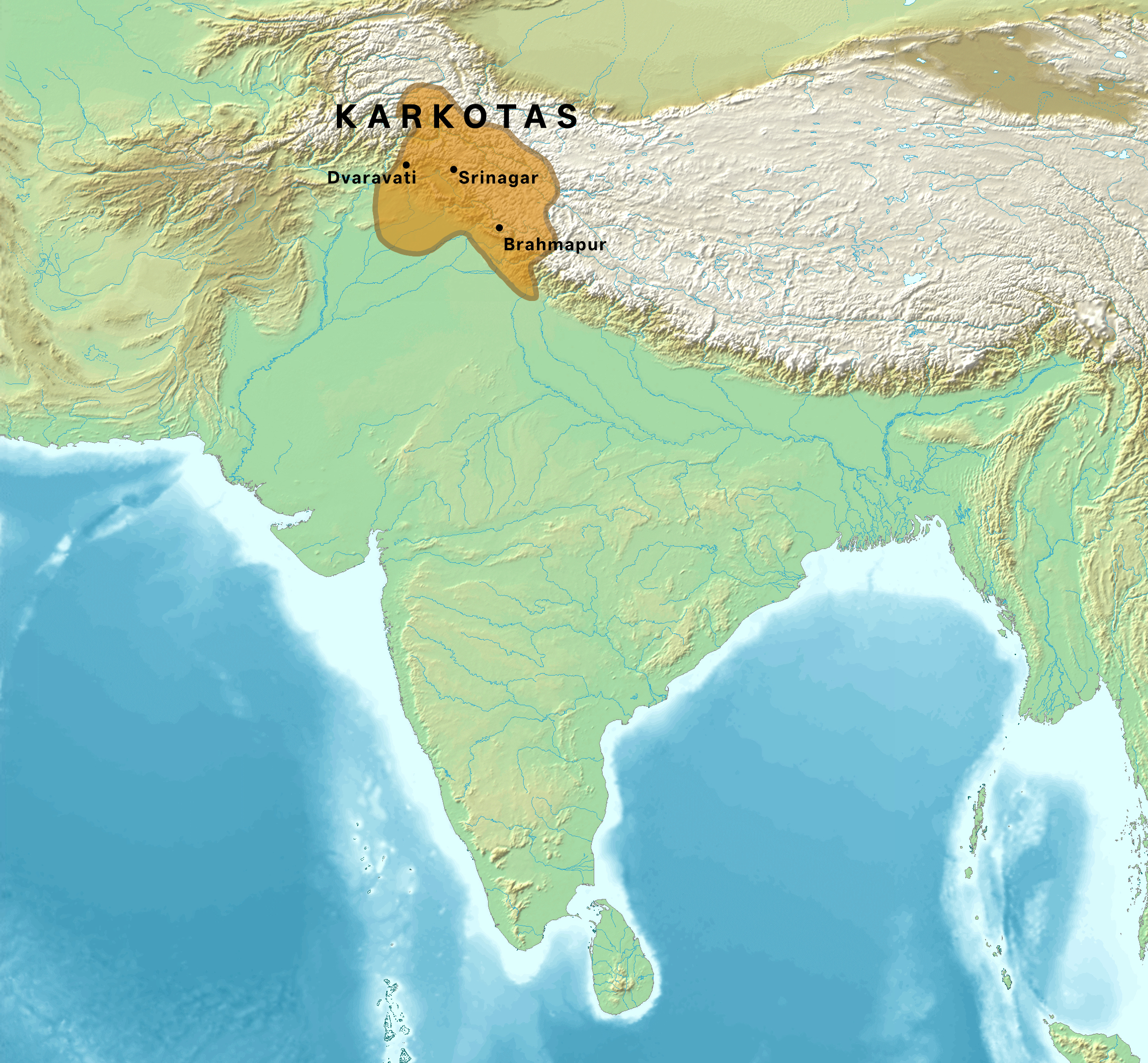
- Heartland of the Karkota dynasty around Srinagara, with neighbouring polities, circa 700 CE.
- Capital: Parihaspur
- Religion: Hinduism
- Government: Monarchy
- Historical era: Classical India
  - Established: 625
  - Disestablished: 855
Preceded by	Succeeded by
Alchon Huns; Gonanda dynasty (II)	Utpala dynasty
- Today part of: Afghanistan; India; Pakistan; Bangladesh

The Karkota dynasty (c. 625 − 855 CE) ruled over the Kashmir valley and some northern parts of the Indian subcontinent during 7th and 8th centuries. Their rule saw a period of political expansion, economic prosperity and emergence of Kashmir as a centre of culture and scholarship.

The Karkota rulers constructed several shrines to Vishnu in their dominions. They however also allowed Buddhism to flourish under them. Stupa, Chaitya and Vihara can be found in the ruins of their capital. Martand Sun Temple in the Anantnag district was built by Lalitaditya. It is the oldest known Sun temple in India and was also one of the biggest temple complexes at the time.

Avanti Varman ascended the throne of Kashmir in 855, establishing the Utpala dynasty and ending the rule of Karkota dynasty.

== Sources ==
=== Literature ===
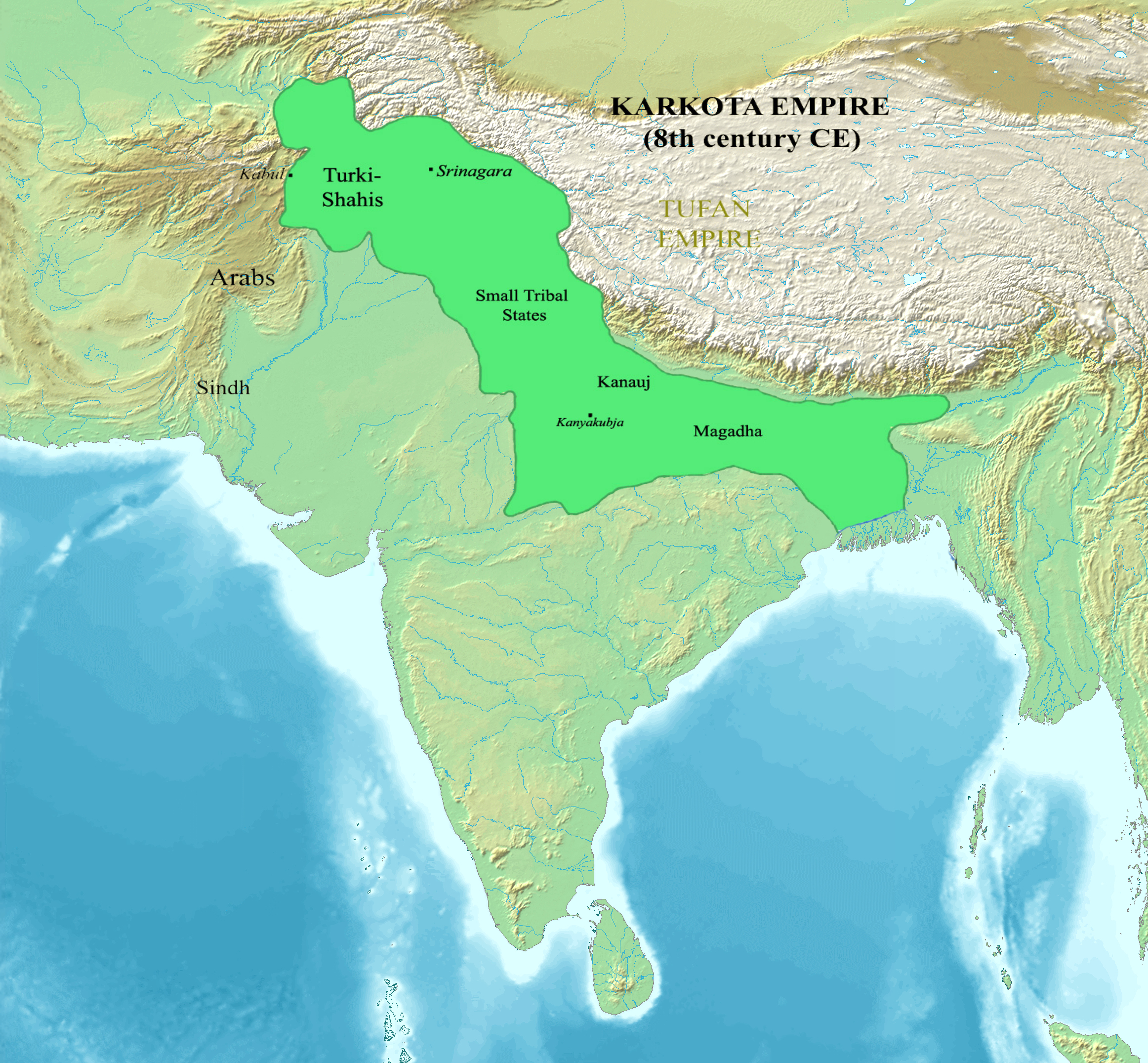
Maximum extent of the Karkota Empire circa 750 CE at the time of Lalitaditya Muktapida. Only Lalitaditya's conquests in the Kashmir neighbourhood and the Gangetic plains are considered as historical.

The Nilamata Purana, believed to have been commissioned by Durlabhavardhana, the first ruler of the dynasty, provides information on contemporary affairs. However, not only that the Purana was penned to reconstruct Kashmir as one of the most sacred space in the subcontinental cosmos by attributing Brahminical divinity to its geographical features and then, establish Durlabhavardhana as its rightful king but also that there have been interpolations as late as the 10th century, the text cannot be treated as objective history. The Vishnudharmottara Purana is another local and contemporary source; it played similar roles in the Karkota polity.

Other sources include the chronicles of a multitude of Buddhist pilgrims—Xuanzang (May 631−April 633), Yijing (673−685), Wukong, Hyecho and others—who visited Kashmir during the dynasty. The Kuttanimata, penned by a court-poet of Jayapida, was a didactic work on erotics but gave a lively account of contemporary Kashmiri life.

==== Rajatarangini ====
The Rajatarangini, an 11th-century work by Kalhana, was aimed at sketching an outline of Kashmir's history since ancient times, and it did discuss the Karkota dynasty in depth. (Note: At least three other Rajataranginis were composed in medieval Kashmir. They are since-lost.) Kalhana depended on a variety of material including earlier historical works, dynastic genealogies, inscriptions, coins and Puranas. The work has a contested repute of being the only pre-modern work in Sanskrit resembling Western notions of history; however, its historical accuracy is disputed—Zutshi and other scholars find the poem to be a blend of "mythical, political, social, spiritual, and geographical" narratives, which aimed at defining Kashmir as an idealised ethical space.

Nonetheless, historical accuracy increases drastically from the fourth book onward, and the narrative of the Karkota dynasty in the Rajatarangini has been heavily used to reconstruct Kashmiri history. Michael Witzel notes the fourth book to be accurate in its chronology (down to day) in that it aligns perfectly with contemporary Chinese sources; however a correction of +25 years need to be introduced throughout the dynasty. (Note: Kalhana misunderstood a Karkota Vamsavali to be in Laukika Samvat, when it was actually in Kali Samvat. Both calendars were used in medieval Kashmir and the beginning of Laukika Samvat equals Kali Samvat 25 (expired).)

=== Coins ===
Coins issued by all major rulers until Muktapida (and Jayapida) have been excavated; these coins were always inscribed in the name of Kidara on the reverse.

== History ==
=== Establishment ===
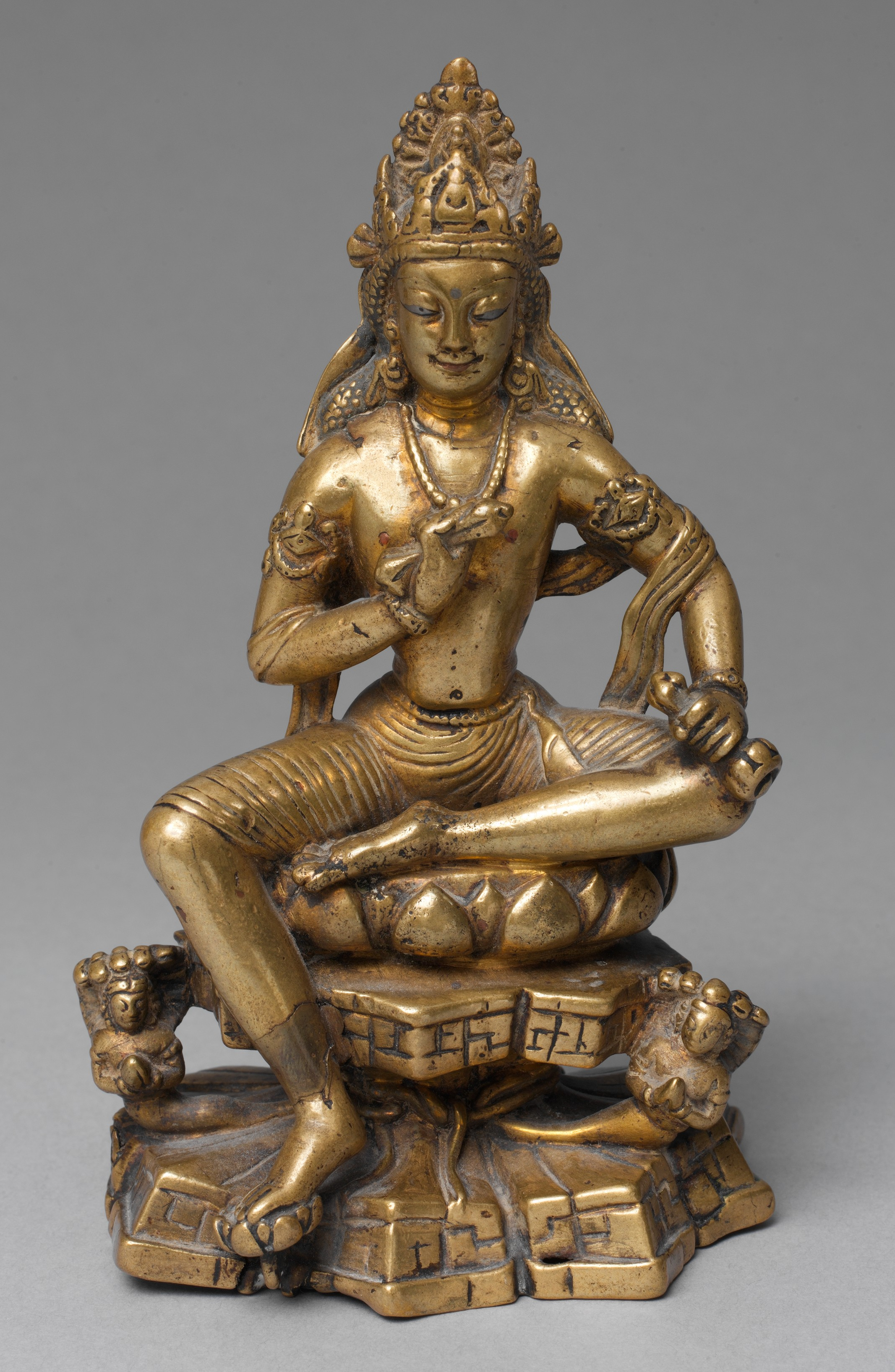
Sculpture of the Buddhist Bodhisattva Vajrasattva, Kashmir, Jammu and Kashmir, 8th century.

Scholars disagree on the specifics of establishment of the Karkotas, though it is held that their establishment followed the rule of the Hunas in the region of Kashmir.

Kalhana's third book mentions of a Gonanda dynasty (II), which ruled for about 590 years till the establishment of the Karkotas; on cross-vetting with coins and inscriptions, names of some of these rulers are found to correspond with the Alchon Huns, who ruled hundreds of years later. Across the first three books, Kalhana reshuffles multiple names, retrofits the same stories, assigns abnormally long reigns, and telescopes some rulers into the past. (Note: The first book of Rajatarangini ends with Yudhisthira I being deposed by Pratapaditya c.180 B.C. Yudhisthira I, the son of a Narendraditya Khinkhila is noted to be the 9th successor of Mihirakula (who is dated to around 704 BC). Mihirakula, in turn, has figures from the Ramayana pantheon — Vibhisana, Ravana, Indrajit et al — among ancestors. Pratapaditya's successors (second book) are noted to be Jalauka and Tunjina I. The latter was deposed by Vijaya from another family, who was succeeded by his son Jayendra. The next ruler was his minister Samdhimati, who went on to abdicate the throne after a few decades. The third book starts with Meghavahana, the great-great-grandson of Yudhisthira I, being restored to the vacant throne from his exile. There is also a Yudhisthir II, the son of Pravarsena II and grandson of Toramana (grandson of Meghavahana). He is dated to 170-210 AD and had a son Lakhana-Narendraditya; Baladitya is noted to be Narendraditya's nephew (and his third successor).) Durlabhavardhana—the founder of the Karkotas—was held to be under the employment of Baladitya, the last ruler of the Gonanda dynasty (II). Baladitya had no male heir but a daughter Anaṅgalekhā and did not wish his territory to be annexed by in-laws. To avert such a possibility he had her married to Durlabhavardhana, who was from a low caste. However, after Baladitya's death, Durlabhavardhana ascended to the throne with help from a minister, and claimed descent from the mythical Naga king Karkotaka, establishing the Karkota dynasty. Witzel seems to accept this view.

Atreyi Biswas however rejects this literal description of the establishment of the Karkota dynasty as fictitious. In a critical reading of the Rajatarangini, and taking into account numismatic as well as literary sources, the dates of the Gonanda rulers are adjusted and Biswas deems the first ruler of the Karkota dynasty to be Durlabhaka Pratapaditya, who claimed the throne after defeating Yudhisthira, the last Alchon Hun ruler of Kashmir. (Note: Mihirakula has been precisely dated to 502 - 530 AD on the basis of inscriptions and coins; he was a Huna ruler. He has been similarly confirmed to be Toramana's son and immediate successor. Biswas notes that no historical evidence has been located for the first six successors of Mihirakula or Yudhisthira I, himself. Ditto as to Yudhishtira II or the three successors of Narendraditya. Biswas however notes that coins and inscriptions attesting to the immediate predecessor of Yudhisthira I (Narendraditya Khinkhila) have been excavated, as have been coins minted by Pravarsena II. Noting that contemporary Huna kings are located across three books and spaced out by over 1000 years, Biswas proposes that Kalhana had the names of individual kings and content (including popular legends) about their rule but not the chronological framework to fit them. Pravarsena II was Mihirakula's brother and he was alive as late as 597 A.D.; he was succeeded by Narendraditya Khinkhila, whose reign, assuming the regnal spans of the first book of Rajtarangini to be correct, ended in around 633 AD. He was followed by a Yudhisthira, who was defeated by (Durlabhaka) Pratapaditya — content-parts of both books thus stand true, if these two rulers were concurrent, which automatically follows if we assume Yudhisthira I and Yudhisthira II to be the same ruler.) His father Durlabhavardhana would have been a subordinate king under the-then Huna ruler, Narendraditya Khinkhila. Baladitya and his immediate predecessors of the Gonanda dynasty would never have existed at all or were subordinate kings under the Karkotas. (Note: Maulavi Hasan Shah wrote a history of Kashmir (not published; late 19th century), based on a Persian translation of Ratnakara Purana by Mulla Ahmed, court poet of Zain-ul-Abidin. All the three works are currently lost or untraceable. However, a partial translation (in English) of Shah's manuscript was published over a journal in 1918 by Pandit Ananda Kaul. Biswas hyothesizes a probable time-frame for the predecessors based on Kaul's translation.) Ahmad Hasan Dani follows her interpretation in one of his works. However, Gudrun Melzer notes that Biswas did not take into account a different chronology proposed by two German historians (Humbach and Göbl), which has since received eminence in Huna studies; scholars have disputed her dating and commentary on Narendraditya Khinkhila. (Note: Gobl and Kuwayama notes a Khingila (not Narendraditya Khinkhila in the above note) to precede Toramana, based on numismatic and literary evidence. In contrast, Biswas had noted Tijin (Thunjina II in the third book of Rajatarangini) to be Toramana's father and predecessor. Melzer expresses reservations on all of these readings. Biswas identifies her Narendraditya Khinkhila with the "Shahi Khimgala" mentioned over a Ganesha inscription but this is disputed by others. Dhavalikar as well as Tucci reject that the two rulers are same and note that there are too many possibilities to date the inscribed king; Tucci however dates the inscription to late fifth or early sixth on a paleographic analysis and Dhavalikar confirms the same time-span on an artistic analysis of the statue. D.C. Sircar as well as Petech date the inscription to sixth or seventh century. Melzer notes that the inscribed Khinkhila was "most probably" a different ruler than Khingila (first paragraph), who could not have existed before the second half of 6th century. However, David Bivar identifies Khingila (first paragraph) with Narendraditya Khinkhila; he is noted to be the second successor of Pravarsena II and dated to sometime before 600. Shōshin Kuwayama rejects that Narendraditya Khinkhila ruled Kashmir at all and assigns him to sometime "before or long before" 600; the inscribed ruler is dated to 753. Overall, Melzer notes that there might have been multiple Huna rulers of the name Khingila (or variants) who had ruled different territories across different time-spans and their details remain hazy. Gobl notes the Alchon Hunas to have migrated to the Kapisa-Kabul area, after Mihirakula's defeat in India. This has been since accepted by Alram and others; numismatic evidence supports such proposition. The ruler who defeated the native Nezak kings is variably identified as Pravarsena II (Gobl) and Narendraditya Khinkhila (David Bivar). In contrast, Biswas rejects these theories of migration on a critical reading of Puranas, Rajatarangini, Xuanzang's chronicles and other literary sources.)

=== Durlabhavardhana ===
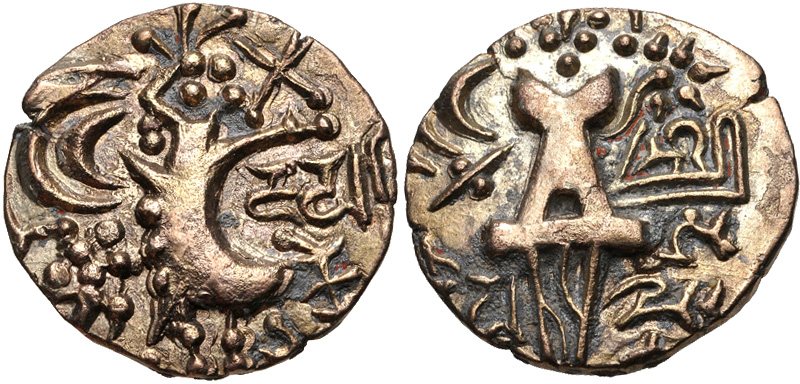
Debased gold Dinar of Durlabhavardhana, founder of the dynasty. Obverse: abstract Kushan-style king standing, with legend Jayati Kidāra (Sharada script). Reverse: abstract seated goddess Ardoxsho, holding garland and cornucopia, legend: Śri Durla and Deva. Karkota coins are simplified/symbolised versions of Late Kushan coins and Kidarite coins.

Kalhana assigns a regnal span of thirty-six years from 625 to 661/2. He was also known as Prajnaditya and gifted many villages (agraharas) to Brahmins. Rajatarangini records no military activity during his reign; assuming Xuanzang to have visited Kashmir twice during his reign, Durlabhavardhana controlled vast swaths of territories including modern day Kashmir, Punjab and Khyber Pakhtunkhwa.

=== Durlabhaka ===
Per Kalhana, Anaṅgalekhā had him declared as her dauhitra and Durlabhaka became known as Pratapaditya, adopting the surname of his maternal grandfather. Durlabhaka is assigned a regnal span of 50 years (662−712). He had a brother Malhana. Durlabhaka married Narendraprabhā, who had been earlier married to Nona, a wealthy merchant from outside Kashmir. (Note: Kalhana notes their romantic overtures to have started when Durlabhaka accepted Nona's invite to have a stay in his residence. The invite was a reciprocation of Durlabhaka having honoured Nona with a stay at the royal palace, for having constructed an accommodation for Brahmins in his homeland Rauhitaka. Durlabhaka suppressed his desires for being unworthy of a king but fell gradually ill, till Nona learned of it. He offered Narendraprabha as a Devadasi, urging him to marry her and regain his health.) He had three sons—Chandrapida, Tarapida and Lalitaditya—in descending order of age.

Durlabhaka's reign saw increasing trade relation with neighbouring polities and the development of the Classical Kārkoṭa style of sculpture. Kalhana records him to have impressive military prowess. Several agraharas were established by Hanumant, son of his minister Uda (var. Oda, Aida).

=== Candrapida ===
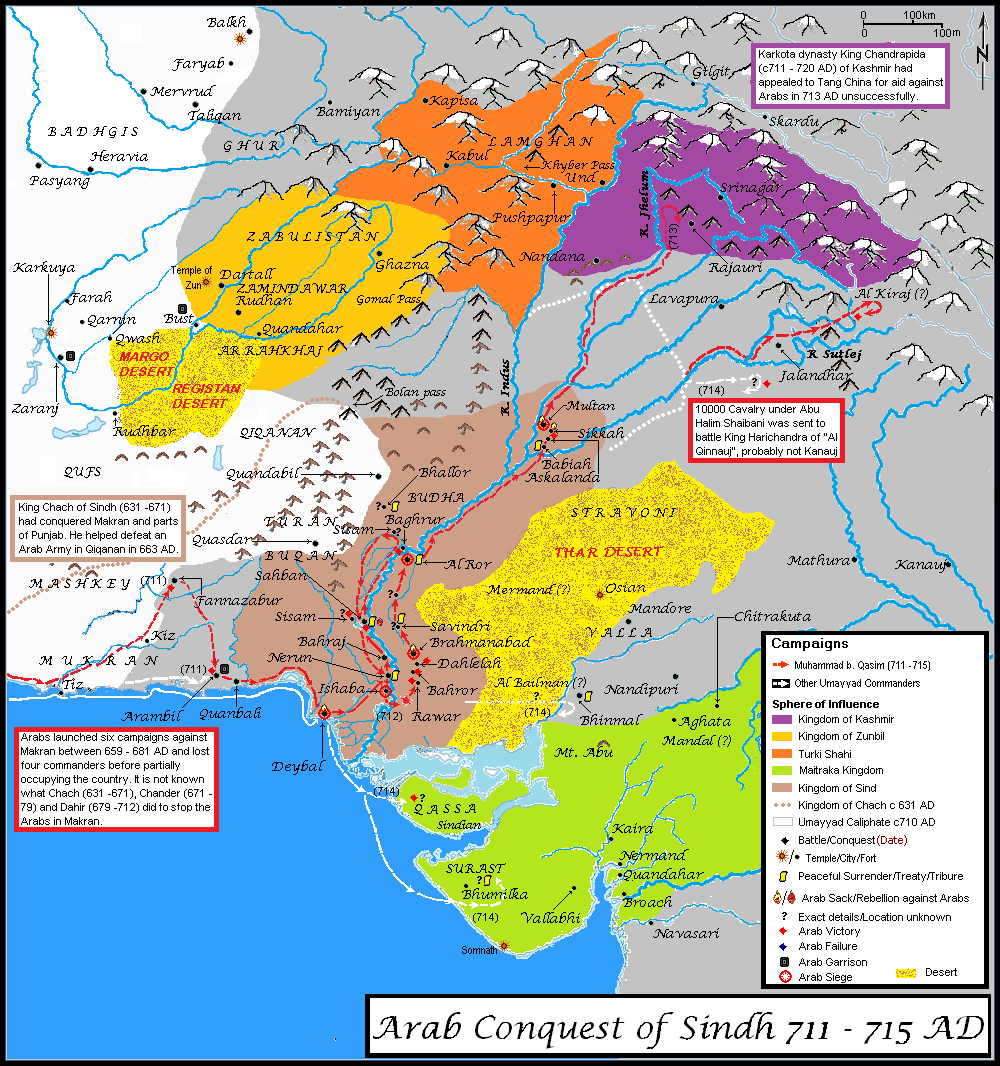
Candrapida was affected by the Umayyad campaigns in India in 711-715 AD. Desert areas (Registan Desert and Thar Desert) Zunbils Turk Shahis Kingdom of Kashmir (Karkota dynasty) Kingdom of Sindh (c. 632– 712 CE) Maitraka Kingdom (c.475–c.776 CE) Umayyad Caliphate (c.710 CE)

Candrapida ruled from 712/13−720 and bore the name Vajraditya. He is otherwise known from the Tangshu under the name Zhentuoluobili. Kalhana paints a benevolent and virtuous image of the ruler—two stories are narrated to the same effect. Jayanta Bhatta's great-grandfather Saktisvāmin was one of his ministers.

In 713, Emperor Xuanzong of Tang received an embassy from Candrapida requesting aid against Arab invasions. Candrapida did not receive any help but nonetheless, managed to defend his territory. In 720, Xuanzong sent an envoy to bestow upon him, the title "King of Kashmir". These diplomatic exchanges led to the formation of an imperial alliance between the Tangs and Karakotas; in 722, after the Tangs emerged victorious against Tibet, the Chinese court credits Kashmir for having provided ample food to their troops stationed in Gilgit.

Kalhana notes him to have been assassinated by his brother, Tarapida, who recruited a Brahmin for the purpose. (Note: Stein notes that the cause might have been derived from contemporary Tantric tradition.)

=== Tarapida ===
Little is noted about his rule in Rajatarangini except that he was tyrannical and oppressed the Brahmins. He bore the name Udayaditya, and was murdered after four years; the practice of magic-rites by Brahmins is held to be the cause.

In October–November 724, Chinese chronicles mention of an unhappy Jincheng seeking defection to Kashmir; the-then King (unnamed) apparently consented and urged for military assistance from Zabulistan to ward off the Tibetan troops. Tansen Sen notes this king to be Tarapida; however other scholars have identified him with Candrapida.

=== Lalitaditya ===
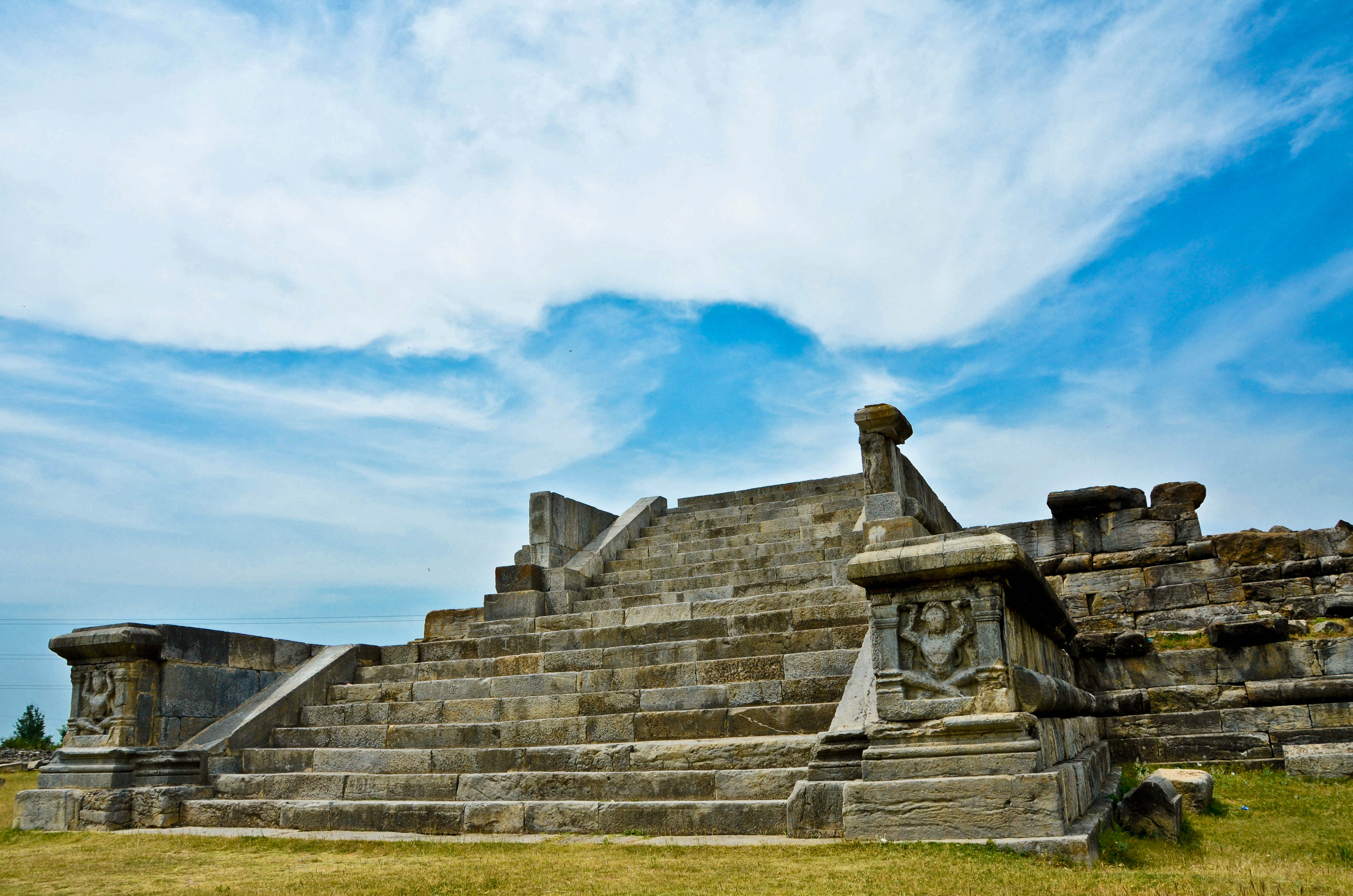
Parihaspur Stupa, built during the reign of Lalitaditya Muktapida, 8th century.

A world conqueror, Lalitaditya Muktapida (724/725−760/761) is credited by Kalhana with extensive conquests spanning major parts of India, Afghanistan and Central Asia; he is said to have even subdued Yashovarman, winning Kannauj. Kalhana lived around four centuries after Lalitaditya, and popular imagination appears to have embellished Lalitaditya's achievements by then. A century before, Al-Biruni noted the Kashmiris to celebrate an annual festival in commemoration of Lalitaditya, who "defeated the Turks and ruled over the world". Lalitaditya is also known from the Tangshu.

Stein had rejected Kalhana's description of Lalitaditya's conquests as "mythology" and noted his ignorance about territories outside Kashmir. However, Hermann Goetz found little amiss with Kalhana's claims and accepted them as "historical fact"; Goetz's acceptance has since penetrated into the work of numerous scholars like André Wink and Ronald Inden. Sen, comparing Kalhana's account with contemporary Chinese and Tibetan sources including official histories, coins and pilgrim-chronicles, agrees with Stein.

Numerous Brahmin immigrants were brought to Kashmir during his time including the ancestors of Abhinavagupta. A brilliant intellectual and artistic culture flourished during his reign.

=== Kuvalayapida ===
Son of Lalitaditya and his first queen Kamaladevi, his short reign of one year and half a month was marked by a succession struggle between him and his half-brother. No evidence other than the Rajatarangini exists to corroborate his reign. Kalhana held him to be a virtuous ruler. After being subject to treachery by his minister, Kuvalayapida realised the folly of material gains, abdicated the throne, and retreated to a holy forest where he attained siddhi.

=== Vajraditya ===
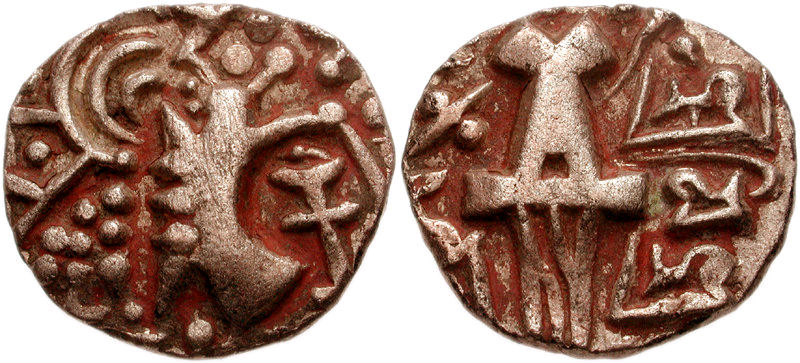
Coin of king Vajraditya (Vigraha Deva) of the Karkota dynasty, c. 763−770.

Son of Lalitaditya and his second queen Chakramardika, he was also known as Bappiyaka. No evidence other than the Rajatarangini exists to corroborate his reign. Kalhana noted the seven years of his rule to have been cruel.

Vajraditya's reign saw a successful raid by the Governor of Sindh and introduction of slave trade. He had numerous concubines and at-least four wives Meghavali, Amrtaprabha, Manjarika and Mamma; his four sons were Tribhuvanapida (from Meghabali), Jayapida (from Amrtaprabha), Prithivyapida I (from Manjarika) and Samgramapida I (from Mamma).

=== Prithivyapida I ===
According to Kalhana, he ruled for a span of four years and one month. He was overthrown by Samgramapida I, who ruled for seven days. Tribhuvanapida, despite being the eldest, had abdicated the throne.

Kalhana does not note any additional detail except not finding either of them to be worthy of wielding royal power, and Stein reiterates that no other evidence of these rulers have been located.

=== Jayapida ===
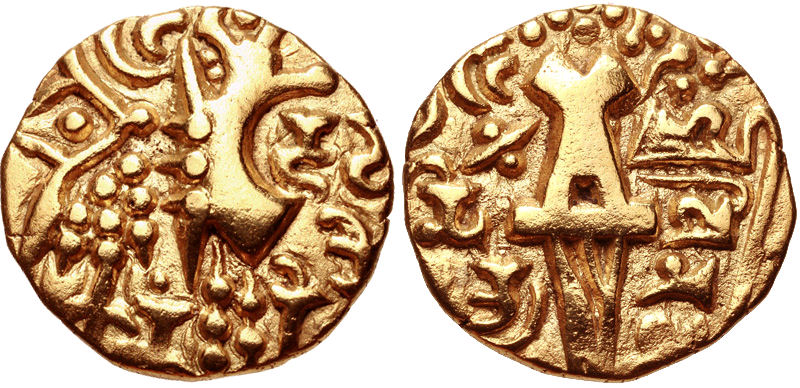
Coin of king Jayapida "Vinayaditya". Jammu and Kashmir.

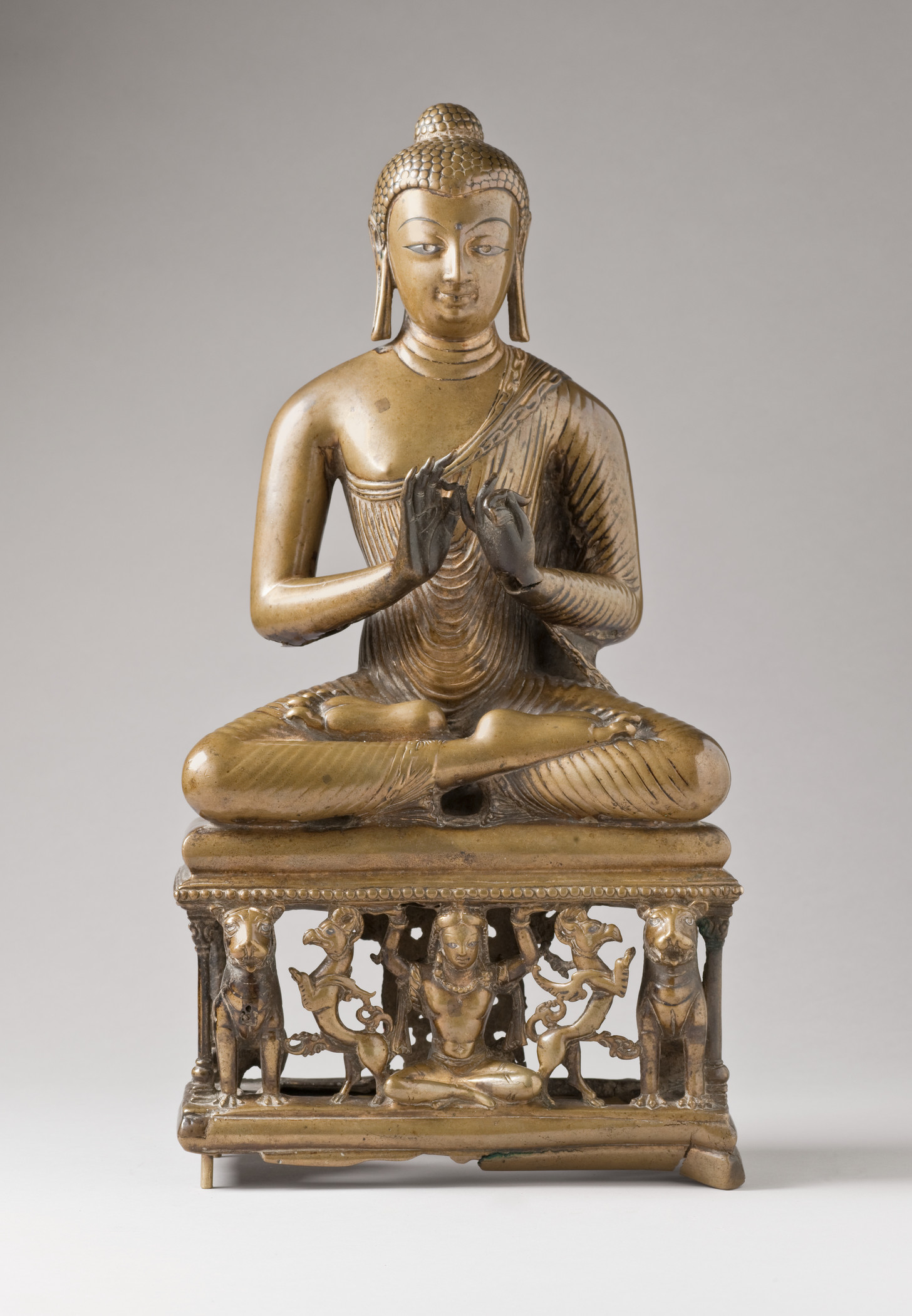
Vairocana Buddha performing the dharmacakra-pravartana mudrā. Circa 725–750, Kashmir, Jammu and Kashmir. Lacma.

Jayapida ruled for 31 years and partook in multiple conquests to faraway territories in an apparent bid to out-rival Muktapida; however, Kalhana's narrative is noted to be excessively exaggerated and in absence of other corroborating sources from across a vast geographical region, the authenticity of the raids and other events must be disputed. He was also known by the name Vinayaditya.

Brahmin immigrants from Indus and Dravida regions were settled in Kashmir during Jayapida's reign; Kshemendra's great-great-grandfather Narendra was a minister in his court. Jayapida married Kalyanadevi, daughter of King Jayanta of Cooch Behar, whilst away in a conquest. Returning to Kashmir, he found his brother-in-law Jajja to have usurped the throne but went on to defeat him.

Kalhana notes his later years to be tyrannical when Jayapida sought to (unsuccessfully) rescind agraharas and imposed a cruel taxation regime on Brahmins, forcing them to emigrate; he was cursed to death by a Brahmin. Jayapida had two sons—Lalitapida (from Durga) and Samgramapida II (from Kalyanadevi).

=== Lalitapida ===
Kalhana condemns Lalitapida as a recklessly extravagant ruler, whose court was infested with courtesans/concubines and jesters, and provided no patronage to learning. He ruled for twelve years and had donated agraharas.

He had one son Cippatajayapida, from his concubine Jayadevi, who was the daughter of a spirit distiller.

=== Samgramapida II ===
Lalitapida was succeeded by his step-brother Samgramapida II, also known as Prithivyapida II. He had at least one son - Anangipida and ruled for seven years; Kalhana notes no additional detail.

=== Cippatajayapida ===
Cippatajayapida (var. Brhaspati) was crowned in 837/8. However, due to his young age, the real power was vested in the five brothers of Jayadevi—Padma, Utpala, Kalyana, Mamma, and Dharma—who followed the orders of Jayadevi but yet engaged in an acute mismanagement of affairs.

=== Disintegration ===
After Cippatajayapida was murdered in around 840, having ruled for twelve years, the brothers gained considerable power but fought each other to retain complete control of the empire, whilst installing puppet kings belonging to the Karkota lineage.

Tribhuvanapida's son, Ajitapida was nominated by Utpala immediately after Cippatajayapida's death. A few years afterwards, Mamma waged a successful battle against Utpala, and installed Anangipida. Three years later, Utpala's son Sukhavarman rebelled successfully and installed Utpalapida, a son of Ajitapida. Under his rule, merchants declared independence at the outposts of the territory. Within a few years, Sukhavarman set out to assume the throne for himself but was murdered by a relative; finally, his son Avantivarman deposed Utpalapida and claimed the throne c. 855 with help from minister Sura, thus establishing the Utpala dynasty.

== Society ==
On a reading of Kuttanimata, the society seems to be unequal and dominated by merchant communities. Materialism was in vogue among the elites, and prostitution received state patronage. Sati as well as Devadasi system were prevalent. The dynasty (at least, the earlier rulers) had sought to restore Hinduism after a lengthy span of Buddhist influence in the valley; however a syncretic environment flourished. (Note: The extents of prior Buddhist influence is doubtful; the religious culture of Hunas is subject to extensive debates in scholarship.)

Hunting was a popular sport for the princely class. Theaters were frequently organised and there were halls for the purpose; Ratnavali is noted to be a popular drama.

== Economy ==
Metallic coins as well as cowrie shells were used as currency. The state collected a variety of taxes—customs-levy, prostitution-levy, market-tax etc.—corruption was rampant and Damodaragupta takes frequent digs.

== Art and architecture ==
=== Literature ===
The Nilamata Purana is believed to have been commissioned by Durlabhavardhana. The Vishnudharmottara Purana, was crafted around the same times. A famed patron of arts, Lalitaditya invited scholars from abroad to his court and promoted study of religions.

Kalhana notes Jayapida to be a liberal patron of arts and even invited scholars from abroad; Yigal Bronner notes his court to have ushered a breakthrough moment in Kashmiri poetics. Daniel Ingalls writes that Jayapada's court was responsible for birthing the "school of literary criticism in Kashmir". Two literary theorists were installed in his office: Vāmana as a minister and Udbhaṭa as the chief scholar. (Note: Udbhata was probably senior to Vāmana and might have begun his career under Lalitaditya.) Udbhata wrote four works—Kumārasambhava, a poem on the theme of the marriage of Śiva and Pārvatī; Kāvyālaṃkārasaṃgraha, a short commentary on Bhāmaha's Kāvyālaṃkāra; another (now-lost) commentary on the Nāṭyaśāstra; and a mostly-lost but extensive Vivaraṇa on Bhāmaha—in what Bronner notes to be an unprecedented volume of literature production by contemporary standards. Vāmana composed sūtra texts. Both aimed at an audience of literary scholars and engaged (for the first time) in critical discussions surrounding poetic theory, praxis and semantic cognition using tools from mīmāṃsā etc.; a grand universe of poetry, rigidly theorising the many elements of aesthetics, their scopes and inter-relation was sought to be created. Kuttanimata was penned by Damodaragupta in his court. Among other noted figures were the grammarian Kṣīra, the poets Manoratha, Śaṅkhadatta, Caṭaka, and Sandhimat, and a Buddhist philosopher Dharmottara.

Ratnākara wrote Haravijaya, under the patronage of Cippatajayapida; in fifty cantos and 4351 verses, it is the largest surviving Mahākāvya and is based on the defeat of Andhaka by Shiva.

=== Sculpture ===
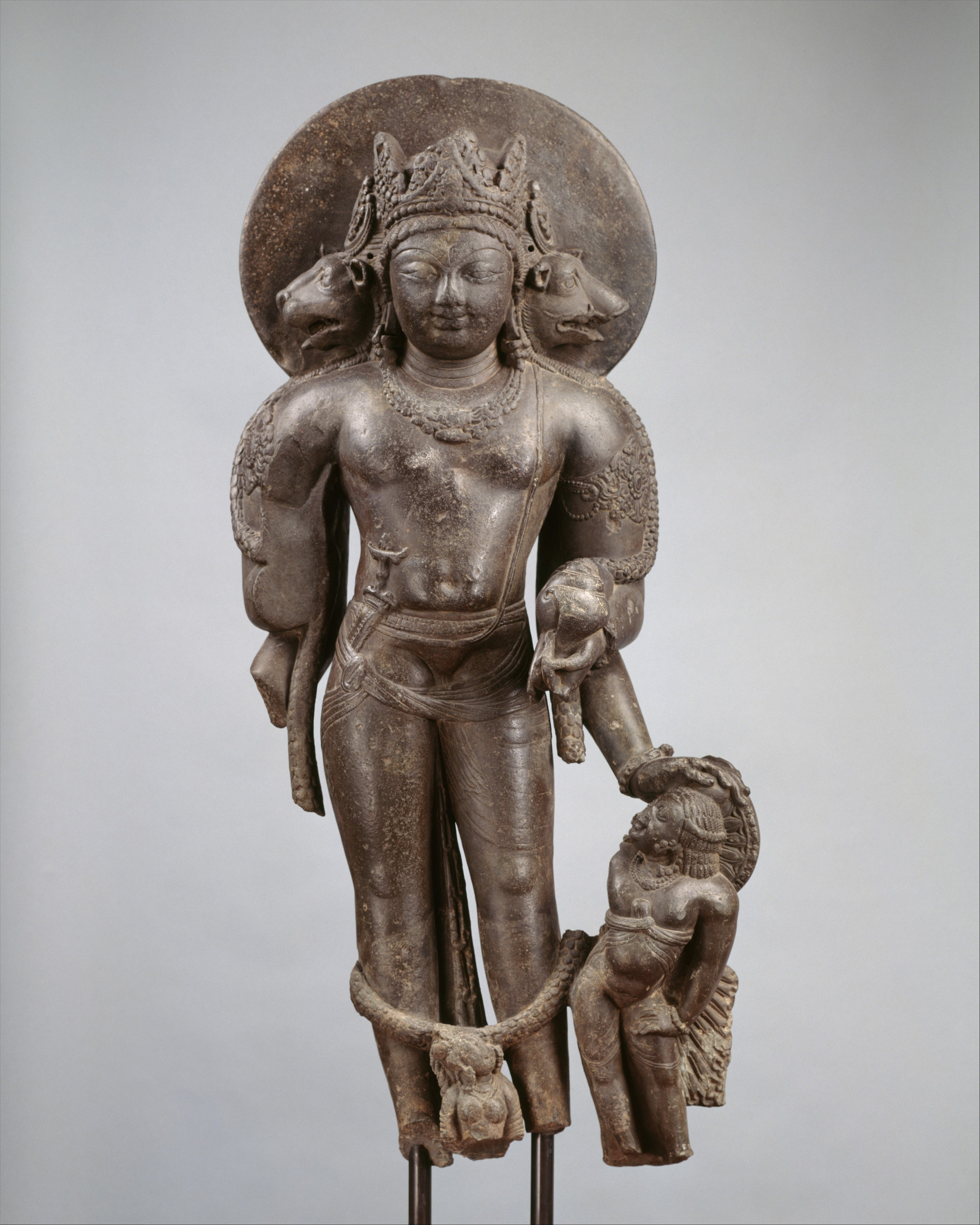
Vaikuntha Vishnu, Kashmir, 775−800. Metropolitan Museum of Art.

Sculpting proliferated during the Karkota dynasty, and Rajatarangini notes of several bronzes. Lalitaditya commissioned numerous gold and silver images for temples and monasteries across faiths, and his span is considered to be the zenith of Kashmiri sculpture.

Contemporary terracotta works (typically, faces) have been located. Stone sculptures dedicated to Durlabhaka have been excavated.

=== Shrines and cities ===
Durlabhavardhana, built a shrine dedicated to Lord Vishnu at Srinagar named "Durlabhasvāmin"; his wife had constructed a Buddhist monastery - Anangabhavana. He also introduced a distinct style of architecture into Kashmir by borrowing post-Gupta trends from Sarnath, Nalanda etc. Durlabhaka established the city of Pratāpapura (current day Tapar between Baramula and Srinagar) and the shrine of Malhanasvāmin; his wife had established the Narendreśvara Temple.

Candrapika had multiple Vishnu shrines installed. Jayapida set up Buddhist Viharas and commissioned the construction of multiple Buddha statues; he also established a new capital town at Jayapura (current day Andrkoth). Lalitaditya commissioned a number of shrines in Kashmir, including the now-ruined Martand Sun Temple and numerous Buddhist structures. He also established several towns, including a new capital at Parihasapura.

The five brothers had set up a Shiva shrine—Jayesvara during Cippatajayapida's rule. After coming to the helm, they commissioned multiple towns and temples—Utapalasvāmin, Padmasvāmin, Dharmasvāmin, Kalyanasvāmin, Mamasvāmin, Utpalapura, Padmapura, etc. Padma's wife had two mathas built.

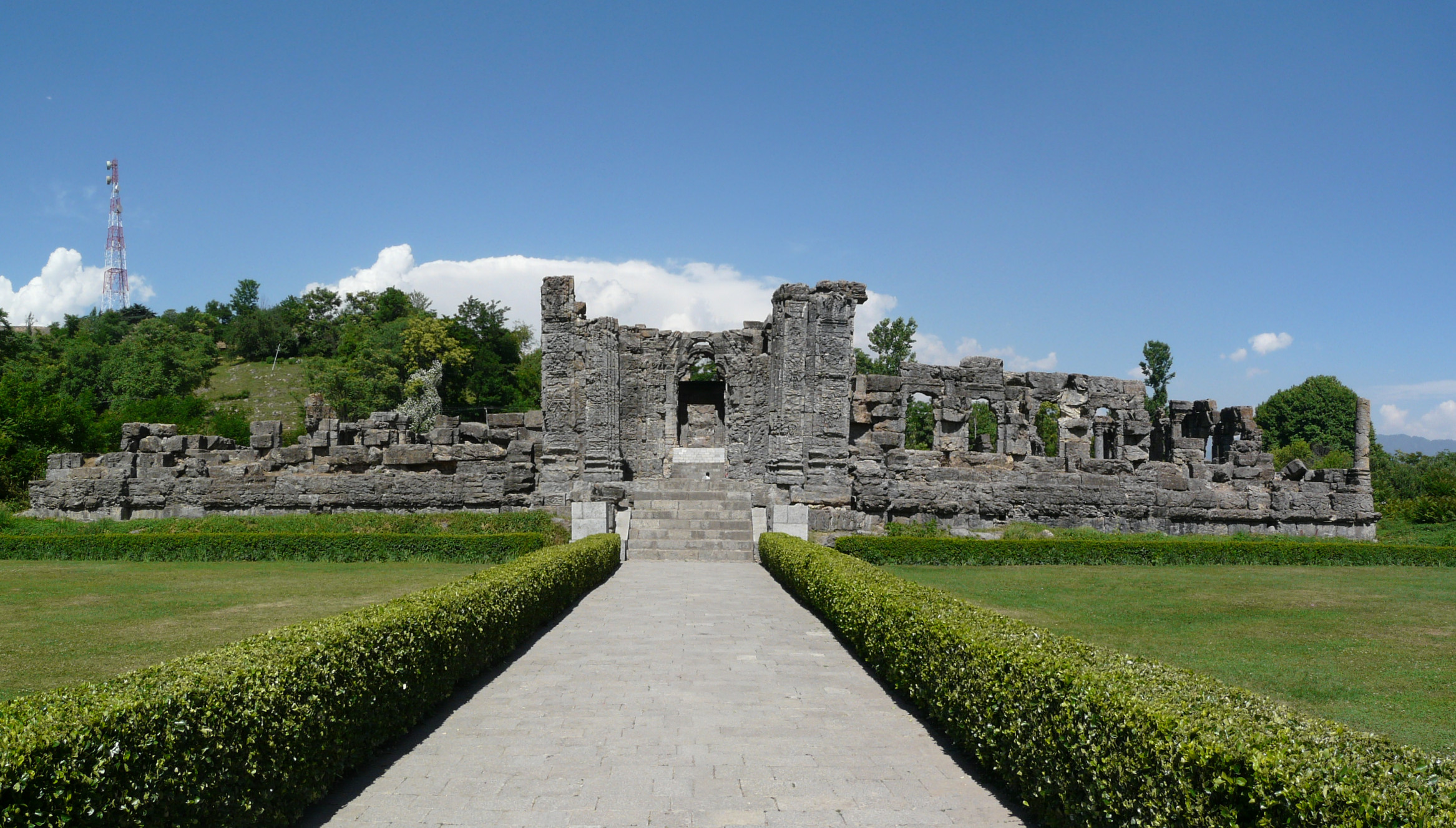
Ruins of the Martand Sun Temple

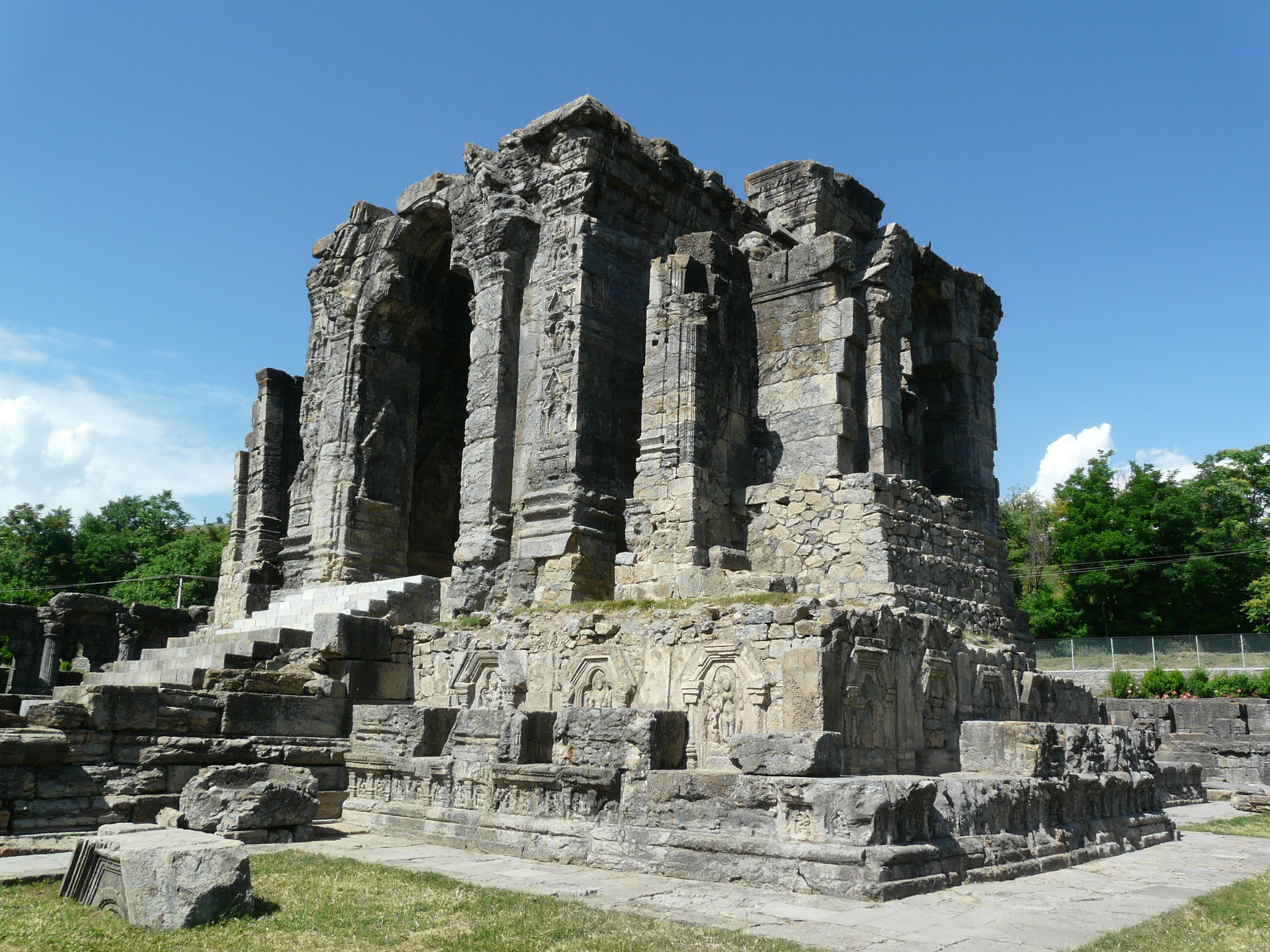
Central temple of the Martand Sun Temple built by Lalitaditya Muktapida.

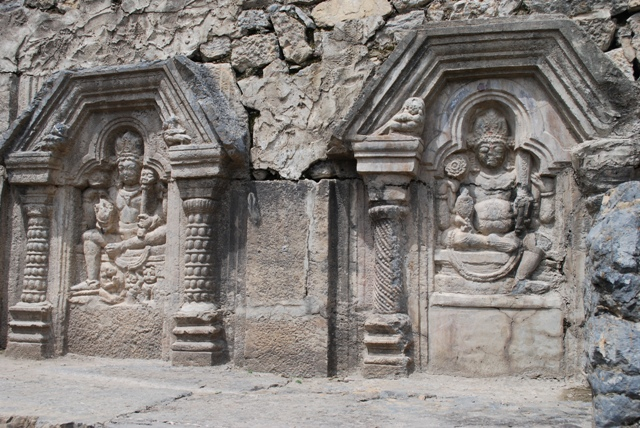
Sculptures in the Martand Temple. The trefoil arch is a characteristic feature of Brahminical temple architecture in Kashmir.

== List of rulers ==
List of Karkota rulers of Kashmir
S.N.	Ruler	Reign (CE)
1	Durlabhavardhana	625–662
2	Durlabhaka or Pratipaditya	662–712
3	Chandrapeeda or Varnaditya	712–720
4	Tarapida or Udayaditya	720–724
5	Lalitaditya Muktapida	724–760
6	Kuvalayaditya	760–761
7	Vajraditya or Bapyayika or Lalitapida	761–768
8	Prithivyapida I	768–772
9	Sangramapida	772–779
10	Jayapida	779–813
11	Lalitapida	813–825
12	Sangramapida II	825–832
13	Chipyata-Jayapida	832–885
Other puppet rulers under Utpala dynasty
14	Ajitapida	~
15	Anangapida	~
16	Utpalapida	~
17	Sukhavarma	~

== See also ==
- Karkotaka
- History of India
- Rajatarangini and Kalhana
- List of monarchs of Kashmir
- Martand Sun Temple
