= Gulab Bhavan =

- Interactive map of the Gulab Bhavan area

General information
- Type: Palace
- Location: Srinagar, Jammu and Kashmir
- Coordinates: 34.080457°N 74.864977°E
- Current tenants: LaLit Grand Palace Hotel
- Completed: 1910

Gulab Bhavan is a palace in Srinagar, India. It is a former residence of the maharaja of Jammu and Kashmir from the Dogra dynasty. The palace is in the eastern part of the city and overlooks the Dal Lake. Originally conceived as a royal summer residence, the palace was later converted into a luxury hotel in 1956 and is now operated as The LaLiT Grand Palace. Architecturally, the palace blends European influences with traditional Dogra design, featuring colonnaded verandahs, symmetrical stone masonry, and richly crafted interiors. Notably, its durbar hall houses one of the earliest earthquake-resistant systems in the Indian subcontinent.

== History ==
Construction was initially started in 1910 by Maharaja Pratap Singh as a summer residence, but it was under his successor, Maharaja Hari Singh's initiative that the major impetus to the construction of the palace was given.

After Indian independence, Maharaja Hari Singh moved to Mumbai and the palace was converted into "The Grand Palace" hotel in 1956. Bharat Hotels took over the hotel in 1998, restoring the palace and extending it. In 2008, the hotel was rebranded to LaLiT Grand Palace Srinagar, of The LaLiT Hotels, Palaces and Resorts.

== Architecture ==
The Gulab Bhavan showcases a refined fusion of European and Dogra design vernacular. The two-storey palace features locally quarried stone masonry, complemented by an elegant colonnaded verandah overlooking Dal Lake, and integrates structural motifs reminiscent of European palaces, such as pilasters and corniced window surrounds while retaining distinctly Indian spatial planning and proportions. The palace’s exterior is marked by symmetry and balance, with its rectangular massing further articulated by dominant verandahs and terraces that blur the boundary between indoor and outdoor realms.

Its interior boasted finely executed plasterwork, wood paneling, and detailed cornices, reflecting the craftsmanship of Dogra-era artisans under the oversight of Engineer Janki Nath Madan. Later enhancements by Maharaja Hari Singh maintained the building's coherent architectural character adding subtle decorative elements and landscape framing to preserve both its aesthetic continuity and visual prominence as a lakeside royal residence. The durbar hall, holds the India's first earthquake-proof systems. The main hall, or durbar hall, features one of the earliest earthquake-resistant systems in the Indian subcontinent from the twentieth century. It is adorned with a 2,000-square-foot carpet woven by Iranian craftsmen once imprisoned in Kashmir. It was so well-preserved that it appears freshly removed from the loom.
