= Second Gonanda dynasty =

C. 25 – 561 CE Hindu dynasty of Kashmir

Gonanda dynasty of Kashmir 𑆓𑆾𑆤𑆁𑆢: 𑆫𑆳𑆘𑆮𑆁𑆯 (Old Kashmiri and Sanskrit)
- c. 25 CE–c. 625 CE
- Heartland of the Gonanda Dynasty around Srinagara, with neighbouring polities, circa 700 CE.
- Common languages: Sanskrit (official),Kashmiri (common)
- Religion: Shaivite Hinduism
- Government: Monarchy
- Historical era: Pre Classical India
  - Established: c. 25 CE
  - Disestablished: c. 625 CE
Preceded by
Kushan Empire
Kidarites
Alchon Huns
Succeeded by
Karkota Dynasty

The Second Gonanda dynasty (or Restored Gonanda dynasty), was a Kashmiri Hindu dynasty. According to Kalhana, this dynasty ruled Kashmir just before the Karkotas.

== Sources ==
=== Literature ===
No contemporary literature exists.

The sole mentions are retrieved from the third book of Rajatarangini, an 11th-century work by Kalhana, which aimed to sketch an outline of Kashmir's history since ancient times, and did discuss the Karkota dynasty in depth. (Note: At least three other Rajataranginis were composed in medieval Kashmir. They are since-lost.) Kalhana claimed to have depended on a variety of sources — earlier historical works, dynastic genealogies, inscriptions, coins and Puranas.

=== Coinage ===
Several coins bearing names roughly consistent with the names of the Gonanda rulers — Śrī Meghamah (prob. king Meghavahana), Śrī Pravarasenah (King Pravarasena), Śrī Tuysīna (prob. King Tunjina), and Śrī Toramaņa (Toramana) — have been recently discovered. These coins are quite rare, made of copper, silver, or debased gold, and generally follow Kushan and Kidarite designs.

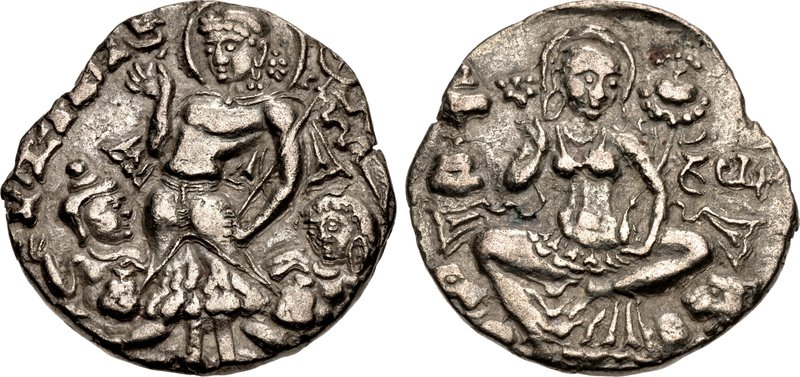
Coinage of Pravarasena, supposed founder of Srinagar. Obverse: Standing Shiva with two figures seated below. Name "Pravarasena". Reverse: goddess seated on a lion. Legend "Kidāra". Circa 6th-early 7th century CE.

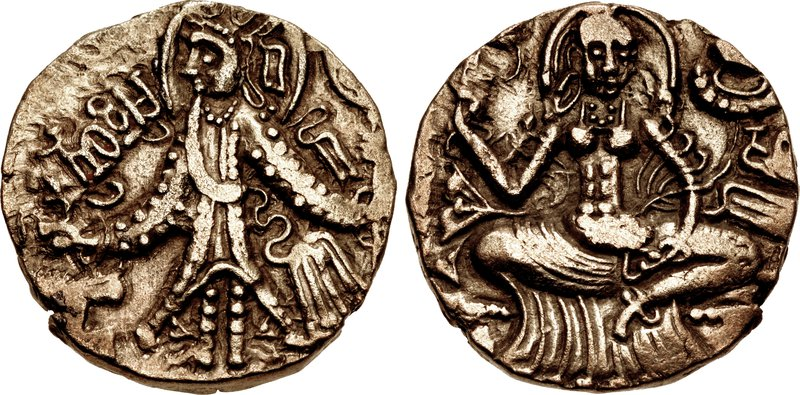
Coin in the name of Sri Tujina. Circa 7th century CE, Kashmir. Obverse: King in Kushan style, legend to left: "Sri Tu[jina]". Reverse: goddess on a lotus, legend to left: "Jaya", to right: "Kidara".

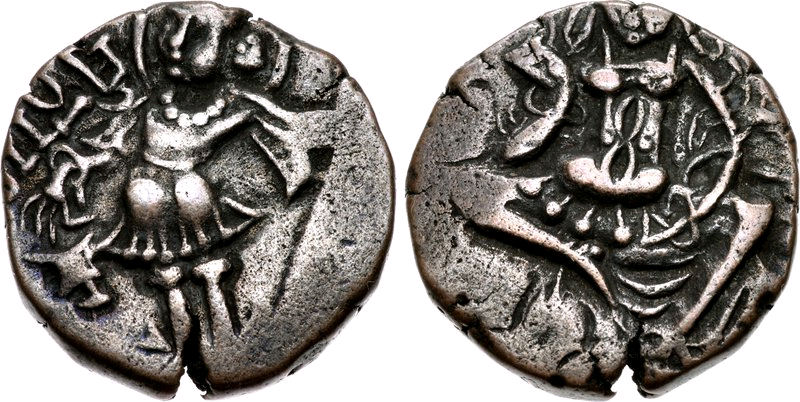
Coin in the name of Śrī Toramaņa (the Kashmir ruler named Toramana).

They show on the obverse a standing Shiva figures, variously accompanied by animals or Gana attendants, with the name of the king in the Brahmi script. On the reverse, the Goddess Ardoxsho or Sri Lakshmi appears seated, with a Kidara monogram to left, and Jaya in Brahmi to right.

== Accuracy ==
The third book of the Rajatarangini, the last Gonanda dynasty of Kashmir ruled for about 590 years, until the establishment of the Karkota dynasty. However the chronology is widely deemed to be faulty and on cross-vetting with coins and inscriptions from outside Kashmir, the names of some of the Gonanda rulers are found to roughly correspond with the Alchon Huns, who ruled hundreds of years later than the time-frame assigned by Kalhana. In Kalhana's narrative, names of some rulers are reshuffled and/or repeated multiple times across the first and third book, some stories are retrofitted and recycled, some reigns are impossibly long, and some rulers are telescoped into the past.

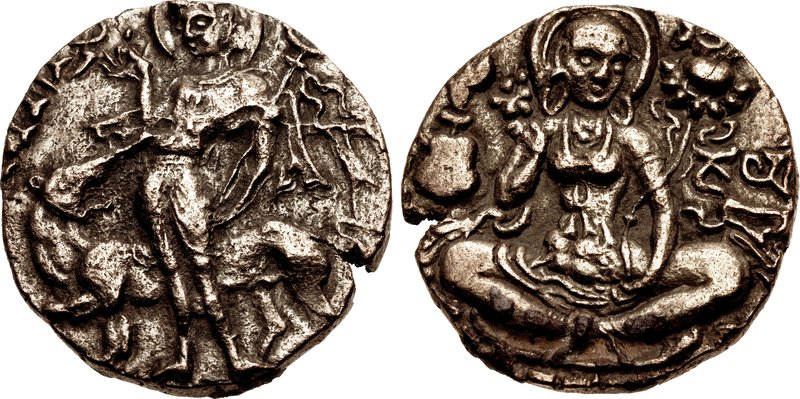
Coinage of Meghavahana. Obverse: Shiva Pashupati ("Lord of the Beasts"), making a mudra gesture with right hand and holding filleted trident; behind, a lioness or tiger. Trace of legend Meghana... in Brahmi. Reverse: Goddess seated facing on lotus, holding lotus in both hand, Kidara monogram to left, Jaya in Brahmi to right.

== Establishment ==
This dynasty was of Kashmiri origin, and around late 400 ce this dynasty was influenced by Kiderites and Alkhon Huns or Huna people, the Huna princes did marriages with members of this dynasty, that's how it was established.according to some theories their founder Meghavahana is a descendent of Great Kushan king Kanishka from maternal line and Huna king Toramana from Paternal line.

== Rule ==
This sections gives a literal description of the content of the third book in Rajatarngini. Efforts by historians to probe into individual kings are mentioned.

=== Meghavahana ===
Meghavahana was the son of Yudhisthira I's great-grandson, who had been granted asylum by Gopaditya, the king of Gandhara. Kalhana assigns a regnal span of 34 years. Meghavahana had been selected the husband of a Vaishnavite princess at a Swayamvara in another kingdom. The ministers of Kashmir brought him to Kashmir after San dhimati proved to be an unwilling king. Meghavahana banned animal slaughter and compensated those who earned their living through hunting. He patronized Brahmins, and set up a monastery. His queens built Buddhist viharas and monasteries. He subdued kings in regions as far as Sinhala Kingdom, forcing them to abandon animal slaughter.

=== Shreshtasena (Pravarasena I / Tungjina II) ===
Son of Meghavahana. Kalhana assigns a regnal span of 30 years.

=== Hiranya ===
Son of Shreshtasena, assisted by his brother and co-regent Toramana. The king imprisoned Toramana, when the latter stuck royal coins in his own name. Toramana's son Pravarasena, who had been brought up in secrecy by his mother Anjana, freed him. Hiranya died childless. Several coins of a king named Toramana have been found in the Kashmir region. This king is identified by some with Huna ruler Toramana, although his successor Mihirakula is placed much earlier by Kalhana. Kalhana assigns a regnal span of about 30 years.

=== Toramana ===
Son of Pravarasena I, Vice-king of Hiranya. Kalhana assigns a regnal span of years.

=== Matrigupta ===
According to Kalhana, the emperor Vikramditya (alias Harsha) of Ujjayini defeated the Shakas, and made his friend and poet Matrigupta the ruler of Kashmir. After Vikramaditya's death, Matrigupta abdicated the throne in favour of Pravarasena. According to D. C. Sircar, Kalhana has confused the legendary Vikramaditya of Ujjain with the Vardhana Emperor Harsha (c. 606-47 CE). The latter is identified with Shiladitya mentioned in Xuanzang's account. However, according to M. A. Stein, Kalhana's Vikramaditya is another Shiladitya mentioned in Xuanzang's account: a king of Malwa around 580 CE. Kalhana assigns a regnal span of 4 years and 9 months.

=== Pravarasena II ===
Historical evidence suggests that a king named Pravarasena ruled Kashmir in the 6th century CE. According to Kalhana, Pravarasena subdued many other kings, in lands as far as Saurashtra. He restored the rule of Vikramaditya's son Pratapshila (alias Shiladitya), who had been expelled from Ujjain by his enemies. Pratapshila agreed to be a vassal of Pravarasena after initial resistance. He founded a city called Pravarapura, which is identified by later historians as the modern city of Srinagar on the basis topographical details. Kalhana assigns a regnal span of 60 years.

=== Yudhisthira II ===
Son of Pravarasena II. Kalhana assigns a regnal span of 39 years and 8 months.

=== Narendraditya I ===
Son of Yudhishthira II and Padmavati. Kalhana assigns a regnal span of 13 years.

=== Ranaditya I (Tungina III) ===
Younger brother of Narendraditya. His queen Ranarambha was an incarnation of Bhramaravasini. The Chola king Ratisena had found her among the waves, during an ocean worship ritual. Kalhana assigns a regnal span of 300 years.

=== Vikramaditya ===
Son of Ranaditya. Kalhana assigns a regnal span of 42 years.

=== Baladitya ===
Younger brother of Vikramaditya. He subdued several enemies. Baladitya (apparently) had no male heir but a daughter Anaṅgalekhā and did not wish his territory to be annexed by in-laws. To avert such a possibility he married her to Durlabhavardhana, a low-caste employee having no royal lineage. However, after Baladitya's death, Durlabhavardhana ascended to the throne with help from a minister, and claimed descent from the mythical Naga king Karkotaka, establishing the Karkota Dynasty.

This view is accepted by Witzel. Kalhana assigns a regnal span of 36 years and 8 months.

== See also ==
- Karkoṭa dynasty
