= Toramana of Kashmir =

Huna King

- Ruler of Kashmir
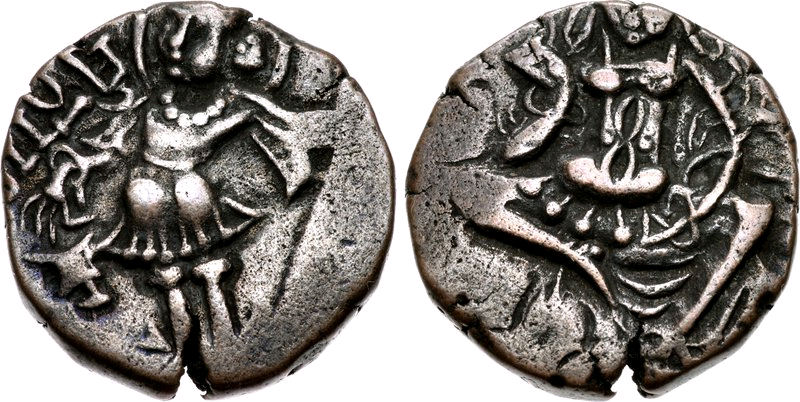
- Coin of Toramana of Kashmir. Approximate location of Toramana II's territory
- Reign: 6-7th century CE

Toramana of Kashmir (Gupta script: Śrī Toramāṇa, "Lord Toramana"), was a ruler of Kashmir in the 6-7th century CE. This ruler has often been called "Toramana II" in numismatic studies, but this name now tends to be used for an earlier Alchon Hun ruler of Kabulistan: Toramana II.

== Descendants of the Alchon Huns ==
The copper coinage of Toramana of Kashmir is found extensively in the region of Kashmir, together with the similarly styled coinage of other rulers such as Sri Pravarasena, Sri Megavah, and Sri Tuisyna. These coins are generally dated to the 6th-7th century CE, with the coins of Toramana coming last in the chronology and being copied for several centuries thereafter. Other rulers by the name of Toramana are known, such as the famous Alchon Hun rulers Toramana and Toramana II.

Given the time period and the geographical location of these Kashmiri rulers, and the fact that their names are identical or similar to the names of the 5-6th century Hunnish Alchon Hun rulers of northwestern India, it is "very likely" that they were themselves descendants of the Alchon Huns in the Kashmir area. The Alchon Huns are known to have resettled in the area of Gandhara and Kashmir following their defeats in northwestern India.

=== Coinage ===
The known coinage of Toramana of Kashmir is in copper only. These coins follow the coins types of the later Kushans and Kidarites, with king standing on the obverse and a goddess holding a lotus on the reverse. The name Toramama appears on the obverse legend in 5-6th century Brahmi script. The reverse has the legend "Ki-dd-ra" written vertically, which might refer to the former occupation of Kashmir by the Kidarites. The word Kidara would remain on Kashmir coinage as late as the Karkota dynasty.

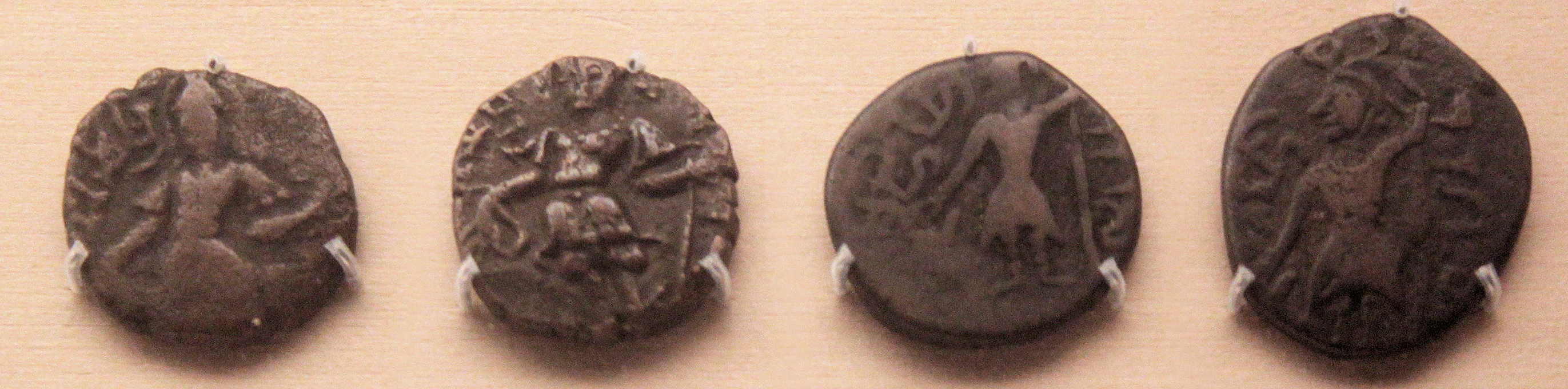
Coins of Toramana of Kashmir, Shanghai Museum.

== Appearance in the Rajatarangini ==
Several rulers with Alchon names appear in Kalhana's Rajatarangini (composed in the 12th century CE).

Although the chronology of the Rajatarangini is largely deficient, several of the names of these rulers, especially those belonging to the so-called Gonanda dynasty (II), have been confirmed by these coin finds in Kashmir and dated to the 6-7th century CE. According to Raj Kumar, "the connection of this coinage with Kalhana's notice cannot be doubted."

According to the Rajatarangini, Toramana of Kashmir was son of Shreshtasena (Pravarasena I) and grandson of Megavahana, and was sub-king to his brother Hiranya. According to the account, Hiranya imprisoned Toramana when the latter stuck royal coins in his own name. The discovery of the coinage of Toramana of Kashmir lends some credence to this story. According to the Rajatarangini, the son of Toramana was Pravarasena II, and again coinage in his name has been found.

According to the Rajatarangini, this line of rulers was dethroned by Pratapaditya, son of the founder of the Kashmiri Karkoṭa Empire, Durlabhavardhana.

== Later imitations of the coinage of Toramana of Kashmir ==
The coins of Toramana of Kashmir remained in use and were copied for several centuries thereafter, until the end of Hindu rule in Kashmir (Lohara dynasty, 1003-1320 CE).

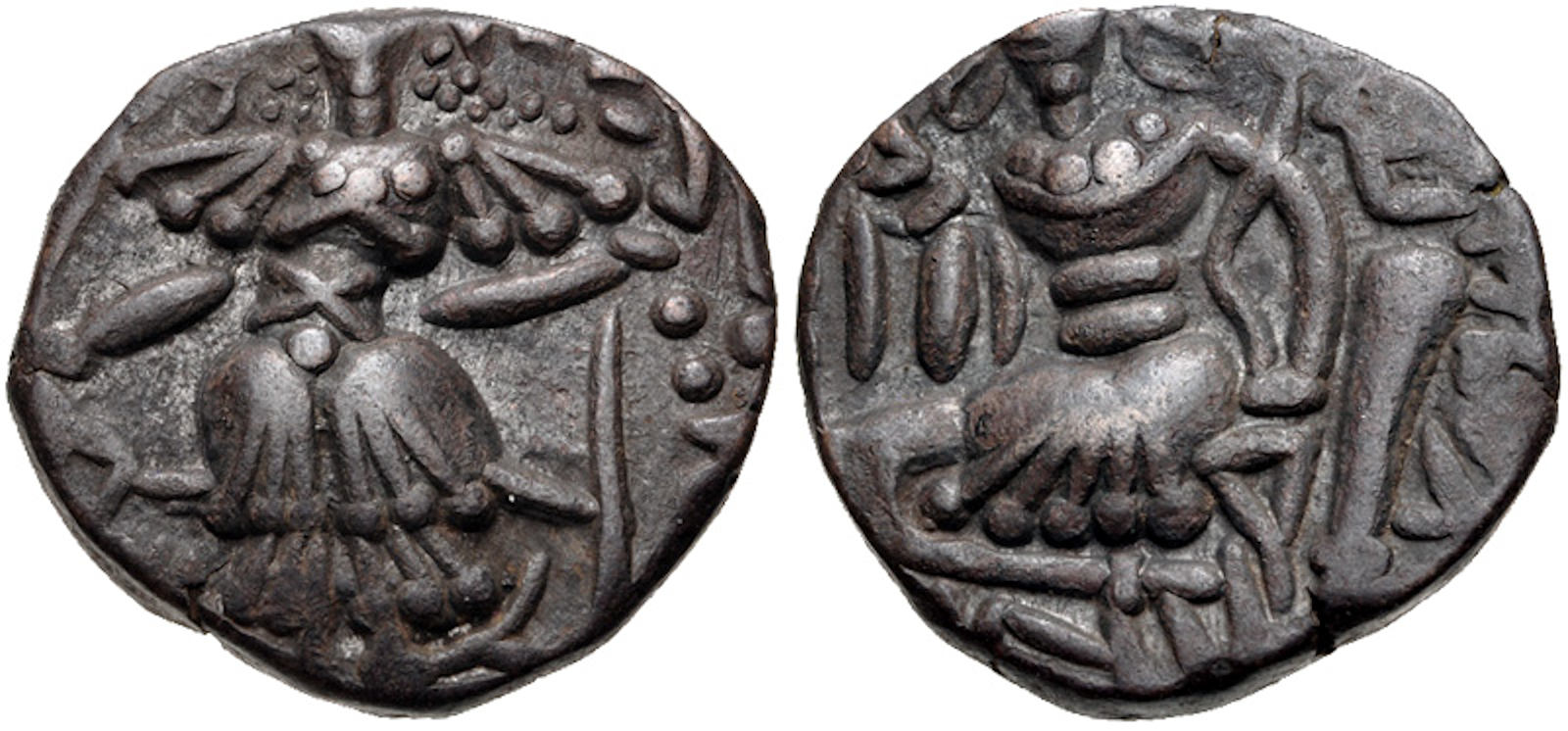
A coin of the successors of Toramana of Kashmir, dated as late as 855 CE.

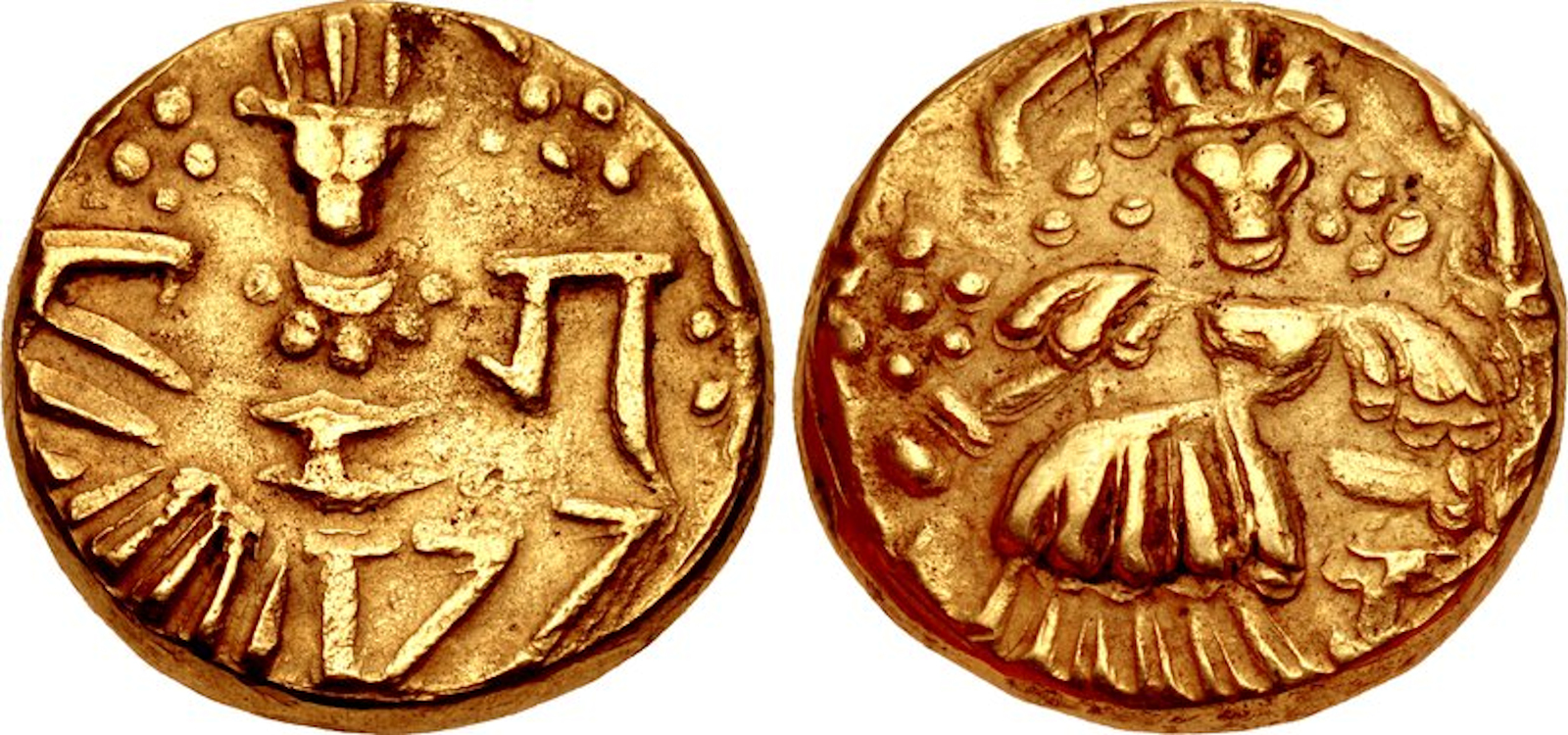
Coin of Jagadeva of the Vuppadevas (Lohara dynasty, Kashmir). 1199-1213 CE. Stylized figure of Toramana standing facing

== Sources ==
- Alram, Michael (2014). "From the Sasanians to the Huns New Numismatic Evidence from the Hindu Kush". The Numismatic Chronicle. 174: 261–291. ISSN 0078-2696. JSTOR 44710198.
- Cribb, Joe (1 April 2017). "Early Medieval Kashmir Coinage – A New Hoard and An Anomaly". Numismatic Digest. 40.
- Chandra Ray, Sunil (1969). Early History And Culture Of Kashmir. New Delhi: Munshiram Manoharlal.
