= Lohara =

Lohara may refer to:

== People ==
- Lohara dynasty, a dynasty in Kashmir

== Andhra Pradesh, India ==
- Lohara, Andhra Pradesh, a village in Adilabad Mandal, Adilabad district

== Bihar, India ==
- Lohara, Nalanda, a panchayat village in Harnaut Tehsil, Nalanda District
- Lohara, Munger, a village in Tetiha Bambor Tehsil, Munger District

== Chhattisgarh, India ==
- Lohara, Durg, a village in Dondiluhara tehsil, Durg district
- Lohara, Kawardha, a village in Kawardha tehsil, Kawardha district

== Maharashtra, India ==
- Lohara, Akola, a village in Balapur Taluka, Akola district
- Lohara, Latur, a panchayat village in Udgir Taluka, Latur district
- Lohara Tahsil, an administrative division in Osmanabad district
- Lohara Bk., a panchayat village in Lohara Taluka in Osmanabad district

== Punjab, Pakistan ==
- Lohara, Punjab, a village in Zafarwal tehsil, Narowal District

== See also ==
- Lahore (disambiguation)
- Lohar (disambiguation)
