= Lohar =

Lohar may refer to:

- Lohar (caste)
- Lohar (surname)
- Lohar, Punjab

== See also ==
- Lahore (disambiguation)
- Lohar (disambiguation)
- Lohra (disambiguation)
- Loharu
- Gadia Lohar
