= Didda =

Ruler of Kashmir from 980 to 1003

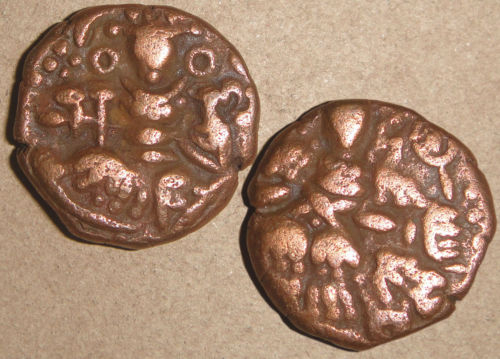
- Copper coin featuring Queen Didda

Queen of Kashmir
- Reign: 980 – 8 August 1003
- Predecessor: Bhimagupta (r. 975 – 980)
- Successor: Samgrāmarāja (r. 1003–1028)

Regent of Kashmir
- Regency: 958 – 980
- Monarch: Abhimanyu II (r. 958 – 972); Nandigupta (r. 972 – 973); Tribhuvanagupta (r. 973 – 975); Bhimagupta (r. 975 – 980)
- Born: c. 924
- Died: 8 August 1003 (aged 78–79)
- Spouse: Kshemagupta
- Issue: Abhimanyu II
- House: Lohara dynasty (by birth); Utpala dynasty (by marriage)
- Father: Simharaja, King of Lohara
- Religion: Hinduism
- Relatives: Bhimadeva Shahi (maternal grandfather); Udayaraja (brother); Samgrāmarāja (nephew)

Didda or Dyed Reayn (c. 924 – 8 August 1003), also known as The Catherine of Kashmir, was the last ruler of the Utpala Dynasty of Kashmir from 980 to 1003. She first acted as regent for her son and various grandsons from 958 to 980, and from 980 as sole ruler and monarch. Most of the information about Didda comes from the Rajatarangini, a work written by Kalhana in the twelfth century.

== Early life ==
Didda was a daughter of Simharāja, the King of Lohara, and a granddaughter on her maternal side of Bhimadeva Shahi, one of the Hindu Shahi of Kabul. Lohara lay in the Pir Panjal range of mountains, on a trade route between western Punjab and Kashmir.

At the age of 26, she married the King of Kashmir, Ksemagupta, thus uniting the Kingdom of Lohara with that of her husband. Even prior to becoming regent, Didda had considerable influence in state affairs, and coins have been found which appear to show both her name and that of Ksemagupta.

=== As regent ===
When Ksemagupta died following a fever contracted after a hunt in 958, he was succeeded by his son, Abhimanyu II. As Abhimanyu was still a child, Didda acted as regent and effectively exercised sole power. Compared to other societies of the period, women in Kashmir were held in high regard.

Her first task was to rid herself of troublesome ministers and nobles, whom she drove from office only to have them rebel against her. The situation was tense and she came close to losing control, but having asserted her position with support from others, including some whom she bribed, Didda displayed a ruthlessness in executing not only the rebels who had been captured but also their families. Further trouble erupted in 972, when Abhimanyu died. He was succeeded by his son, Nandigupta, still a young child himself, and this caused restlessness among the Dāmaras, who were feudatory landlords and later to cause huge problems for the Lohara dynasty which Didda founded.

In 973, she 'disposed of' Nandigupta, in Stein's phrase, and then did the same to Tribhuvanagupta, his younger brother, in 975. This left her youngest grandson, Bhimagupta, on the throne, again with Didda as regent. Her desire for absolute power became untrammeled, especially after the death of Phalunga, a counsellor who had been prime minister of her husband before being exiled by Didda after Ksemagupta's death and then brought back into her fold when his skills were required. She also took a lover called Tunga at this time, and although he was a mere herdsman, this provided her with a sense of security sufficient that in 980 she arranged for Bhimagupta to be tortured to death and assumed unfettered control for herself, with Tunga as her prime minister.

=== As monarch ===
Didda ruled as Queen regnant from 980 until her death in 1003, at the age of 79. She is one of the very few female monarchs in Indian history. She is sometimes called the Catherine of Kashmir, referring to the ruthless Catherine the Great of Russia, who ruled long and well with the help of her favourites, whom she periodically purged.

Although there remained some discontent among the Dāmaras, Didda and Tunga were able to resolve the issues by force and by diplomacy, causing Stein to comment that

The statesmanlike instinct and political ability which we must ascribe to Didda in spite of all the defects of her character, are attested by the fact that she remains the last in peaceful possession of the Kashmir throne, and was able to bequeath it to her family in undisputed succession.

Vigraharaja had assumed control after he had murdered her parents. Udayaraja had to flee. She adopted a nephew, Samgrāmarāja, Udayaraja's eldest son to be her heir in Kashmir. From this decision arose the Lohara dynasty of Kashmir, although Vigraharāja even during her lifetime made attempts to assert his right to that area as well as Lohara. Her reign ended in 1003.

Contrary to certain opinions, Didda died in 1003, ten years before Mahmud of Ghazni invaded India. Didda did not embark on any adventure involving a conflict with any neighboring ruler during her rule. It was during her successor Samgrāmarāja's rule that Mahmud of Ghazni invaded Northern India. In 1015, Ghazni's expedition to Kashmir failed, due to the inability to capture the fort of Loharkot, inclement weather and the mountainous terrain.

== In popular culture ==
- Ashish Kaul's historical fiction Didda: The Warrior Queen of Kashmir is based on Didda's life and legends.
- Didda has come to be seen as a hero in Kashmir's history before the foreign invasions. A commemorative monument listing her alongside other ancient Indian rulers like Ashoka can be found near Kaman Aman Post, Uri, Jammu & Kashmir.
