= Harsha of Kashmir =

Maharaja of Kashmir from 1089 to 1101

Harsha
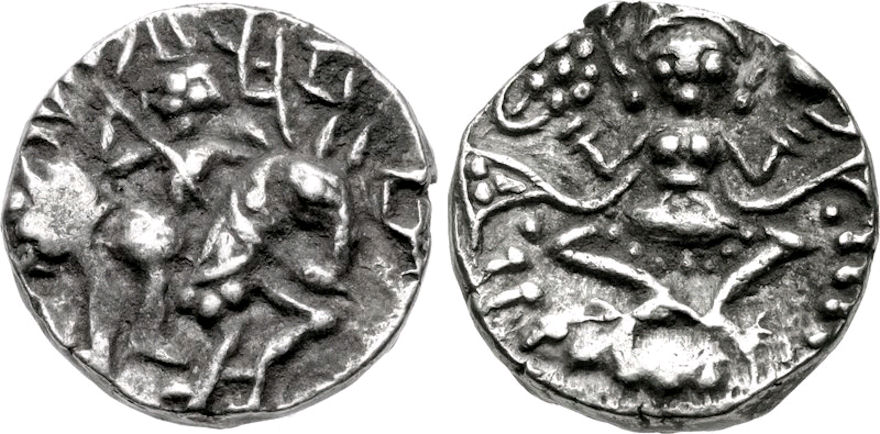
- Silver Coin of Harsha of Kashmir Left: Harsha riding horse right; Sharada legend Sri Harsha Deva above Right: Goddess Lakshmi seated facing on lotus, holding lotus and vase.

Maharaja of Kashmir
- Reign: 3 December 1089 – 31 August 1101
- Predecessor: Utkarsha
- Successor: Uchchala
- Born: 1059; Kashmir
- Died: 31 August 1101 (aged 41–42); Kashmir
- Spouse: Kusal Rani; Vartakar Rani
- Issue: Adesheva; Maharani Ajirani
- House: Lohara
- Father: Maharaja Kalasha
- Mother: Eshant Maharani
- Religion: Hinduism

Harsha (1059 – 31 August 1101), also known as Harshadeva, was the Maharaja of Kashmir from 1089 to 1101. He was given the epithet "raja-Turushka" (Turk king).

Harsha belonged to the First Lohara dynasty, of which he was the last ruler. According to Kalhana, Harsha was built like a god and was extremely handsome. Harsha's conduct has recently been a subject of discussion. Harsha started out as a capable and noble king, then ran into financial trouble because of his spending habits. He was the son of king Kalasha of Kashmir. According to Pandit Prithvi Nath Kaul Bamzai in A History of Kashmir, pp. 143, Kalhana mentioned that even night soil was taxed under his rule. Extravagant expenditure on his troops and senseless pleasure involved him in grave financial difficulties. His accidental discovery of hoarded treasures at the Bhimasahi temple induced him to despoil other temples and he started melting gold and silver images of gods and goddesses.

== History ==
Kalhana's Rajatarangini gives an interesting account of Harsha. Kalhana's father Champaka was a minister of Harsha. Kalhana wrote during the time of Jayasimha (AD 1127-59).

Bosworth, Clifford Edmund (1980). The Islamic dynasties : a chronological and genealogical handbook. Internet Archive. Edinburgh : Edinburgh University Press. pp. 2, 197. ISBN 978-0-85224-402-9. |name=Turushka|group=note}}. According to historian André Wink, in all likelihood, Harsha embraced the Muslim tradition of iconoclasm, as indicated by the term Turushka used to describe him.

From Taranaga (chapter) VII of Rajatarangini (Stein's translation):

1128: Other parasites plundered him by showing an old woman and saying: "There, we have brought your mother Bappika from heaven".

1129: Others brought slave girls before him and said they were goddesses. He worshipped them, and abandoning his exalted position and wealth was laughed at by people.

1148: He had carnal intercourse with his sisters, and angered by a harsh word he punished and violated Naga, the daughter of his father's sister."

It has been suggested that he had been influenced by Turushkas, as Masud Ghaznavi, son of Ghaznavid Sultan Mahmud, had occupied Kashmir in 1034, and Turkish troops were a permanent presence as mercenaries to Harsha:

1149: While continually supporting the Turushka captains-of-hundreds with money, this perverse-minded [king] ate domesticated pigs until his death.

Here Kalhana appears be to stating that Harsha did not even follow the religion of the people he was favoring. He however does call Harsha "that Turushka":

1095. There was not one temple in a village, town or in the city which was not despoiled of its images by that turushka, king Harsha.

1096. Only two chief divine images were respected by him, the illustrious Ranaswamin in the City, and Martanda [among the images]in townships.

1097-97. Among colossal images, two statues of Buddha were saved through requests addressed by chance to the king at a time when he was free with his favors, namely the one a Parihasapura by the singer Kanaka, who was born there and other in the City by Sramana (monk) Kusalsri.

The statue at Parihaspura was built by Lalitaditya Muktapida.

1203. He made the glorious [statue of] the Great Buddha which reached up to the sky.

Abul-fazl mentions that the temples of Parihasapura were finally destroyed by Sikandar Butshikan "Butshikast" (1389–1413).

There was a great fire in Srinagar during the reign of Sussala. All the buildings were burnt except the colossal Buddha:

1184: In the City, which was reduced to a heap of earth, there remained visible and aloft only the great Buddha, which blackened by smoke, and without its abode, resembled a burned tree.

That reminds one of the Great Buddha of Kamakura, the wooden temple of which was destroyed by a tidal wave. The temple of the Great Buddha of Nara was similarly destroyed by fire, but was later rebuilt. a colossal copper image of Buddha once stood in Nalanda, said by Xuanzang to have been 80 feet (24.6 m) tall. The great Buddhas of Kashmir may have been similar.

== See also ==
- Buddhism in Kashmir
- Shah Mir
- Sikandar Butshikan
- Sesshō and Kampaku
- Kashmir Shaivism
- Swami Lakshman Joo
