= Uchchala =

King of Kashmir from 1101 to 1111

King of Kashmir
- Reign: 1101 – 8 December 1111
- Predecessor: Harsha
- Successor: Radda
- Born: 1070
- Died: 8 December 1111 (aged 40–41) (Note: Book 8 of the Rājatarangini states that he was assassinated by Radda in his 41st year, on the sixth day of the bright half of Pausha, in the Laukika year 4187, which corresponds to 8 December 1111.); Banihal, Kashmir
- Spouse: Jayamati
- House: Utpala; Lohara
- Father: Malla
- Religion: Hinduism

Uchchala (Note: Also spelt as Uccala) (1070 – 8 December 1111), also known as Uchchala Deva, was the King of Kashmir from 1101 to 1111. He belonged to the Utpala dynasty, a Hindu Kingdom of Kashmiri rulers and was the founder of the Second Lohara dynasty. He was the close relative of Harsha and the brother of Sussala.

== Conquests ==
Uchchala, accompanied with his brother Sussala, entered in they valley through Lahore and they joined the army of reigning royal family at low-ranking commanding positions granted to them. The army was under the control of Harsha. Uchchala pretended to be the brave and loyal towards the king and as a result, He was appointed as the privileged member of the royal court. In 1099 when the kingdom was under draught-crises, the king imposed heavy taxes on people. Uchchala was disappointed by the taxes which were imposed by the king. He, along with his brother left the capital city Srinagar with the fear that they would be treated same. Despite showing the bravery and loyalty, the king had already started to suspect the two of harbouring the high ambitions to gain the throne and regarded them as a direct threat to the kingdom and rivals to his son Bhoja. After an interval of remaining away from Srinagar, the two brothers then returned with army via Lahore. It was Darmas who supported the two. They attacked the king and burnt the capital city. During this battle, the king's son Bhoja was killed. Uchchala then ascended the throne and was also regarded as the founder of the Second Lohara dynasty. He restored religious building and constructed new temples.

Kalhana, a 12th-century historian who covered the history of Kashmir, writes in his book Rajatarangini that Sussala ruled Lahore with the support of his brother Uchchala. Despite the fact of extended his support, Sussala was among the other rulers who were ambitious of throne. In order to avoid any untoward action identified to be taken by his brother, Uchchala divided the kingdom into two parts which placed Sussala on the throne in Lahore.

== Personal life ==
Uchchala, the eldest son of his parents was married to Jayamati, described as a beautiful queen and fond of singing.

== Assassination ==
Uchchala was assassinated by his enemy Radda at Banihâl (now Banihal) on 8 December 1111, and Radda ruled the region for one night only.
