= Ashoka (Gonandiya) =

- (Gonandiya)
- Predecessor: Sacinara
- Successor: Jalauka (son)
- Born: Kashmir
- Issue: Jalauka (son)
- Dynasty: Gonandiya, Godhara branch
- Religion: Hinduism

King Ashoka, of the Gonandiya dynasty, was a king of the region of Kashmir according to Kalhana, the 12th century CE historian who wrote the Rajatarangini.

According to the Rajatarangini, Ashoka was the great-grandson of Shakuni and son of Shachinara's first cousin.

The great grandson of Sakuni and a son of that king grand-uncle, named Ashoka, who was true to his engagement, then supported the earth

— Rajatarangini I101.

He is said to have built a great city called Srinagara (near but not same as the modern-day Srinagar). In his days, the mlechchhas (barbarians) overran the country, and he took sannyasa.

According to Kalhana's account, this Ashoka was the 48th king of the Gonandiya dynasty (Rajatarangini I102). By Kalhana's calculations, he would have ruled in the 2nd millennium BCE. Kalhana's chronology is widely seen as defective, as he places kings such as Kanishka and Mihirakula respectively 1100 years and 1200 years before their actual reigns.

Kalhana also states (Rajatarangini I102) that this king had adopted the doctrine of Jina, and constructed stupas. Despite the discrepancies, multiple scholars identify Kalhana's Ashoka with the Mauryan emperor Ashoka, who adopted Buddhism. Although "Jina" is a term generally associated with Jainism, some ancient sources use it to refer to the Buddha.

That king, who had extinguished sin and accepted the teachings of Buddha, covered Suskaletra and Vitastatra with numerous stupas

— Rajatarangini I102.

He also built Shiva temples, and appeased Bhutesha (Shiva) to obtain his son Jalauka.

Other scholars have disputed the identification with Ashoka of the Maurya Empire.

In the chronology of the Rajatarangini, the reign of Ashoka is followed by that of his son Jalauka, then a king named Damodara II, and then the Kushan kings Husha, Juska and Kanishka.

== Sources ==
- Lahiri, Nayanjot (2015). Ashoka in Ancient India. Harvard University Press. ISBN 978-0-674-91525-1.
- Guruge, Ananda (1994). Nuradha Seneviratna (ed.). King Asoka and Buddhism: Historical and Literary Studies. Buddhist Publication Society. ISBN 978-955-24-0065-0.
