= Ananta (king) =

King of Kashmir from 1028 to 1068

Ananta اننتا دیو 𑆃𑆤𑆤𑇀𑆠𑆢𑆼𑆮𑆂

King of Kashmir
- Reign: 1028–1068
- Predecessor: Hariraja
- Successor: Kalaśa
- Died: 1068; Kashmir
- Spouse: Sūryavati (m. 1039)
- Issue: Kalasha
Names
- Anantadeva
- House: Lohara dynasty
- Father: Sangrama
- Mother: Srilekha
- Religion: Hindu

Ananta or King Ananta, also known as Anantadeva, was the king of Kashmir from 1028 until his death in 1068. He belonged to the Lohara dynasty. Ananta (Sanskrit: अनन्त) is the Sanskrit term for that which is infinite due to unending element.

King Ananta's wife Sūryavatī is the dedicatee of Somadeva's Kathasaritsagara.

== Coronation ==
At a young age, Ananta succeeded his close relative — who possibly ruled the region for less than a month — on the throne of Kashmir. According to the Kashmiri historian Kalhana, Ananta's mother, Srilekha, attempted to kill the reigning king to rise to power herself. However, the Ekanga nobles and royal bodyguards interceded to crown Ananta instead. Srilekha became the regent for the young king.

== Administration ==
King Ananta's administration was well organized when his reign began, but his top officials were corrupt and quickly caused instability in the kingdom. He devoted significant effort to restoring the effectiveness of the existing administration but was unsuccessful, and his failure resulted in the division of the kingdom into many mandalas (modern: divisions). His wife, a wise queen, reformed state finances. This consolidated his power, and as a result, the government was strengthened jointly by the king and his wife. Historians of the 11th century recorded his administration as "always-divided". It is also recorded that his wife removed all dishonest officials and recruited new ones.

It has been said that the king was an affectionate person and was known for appointing previous enemies to offices in the Aksapatal (modern: tax collection department).

== Battles and events ==
Ananta is believed to have won many victories over other kings during his reign, but evidence collected by historians does not yet confirm this. Tribhuvana was the commander-in-chief of his army, whose forces were largely recruited from damaras. The chief revolted against Ananta and started a war against him. However, the army did not follow Tribhuvana and supported the king instead. Ultimately, Tribhuvana admitted defeat and surrendered himself to the king. Records also contain accounts of Kashmir's conflict with Chamba during the reign of Salavahana (Salakara). After Ananta killed the latter, the kingdom became his dependency. The Kingdom of Chamba was among nine neighboring kingdoms that were subordinated by Kashmir as a result of Ananta's campaigns.

== Economy ==
Ananta's wife, Sūryavatī, had two brothers, but they were believed to be greedy and mercenary. They came to Kashmir where they earned the trust and confidence of the king, but they were always in need of money to support their lifestyles; for instance, they loved chewing betel leaves, which had to be brought from foreign countries at an extravagant cost. They were given charge of the state treasury and managed it poorly. After an interval of some years, the treasury was empty; Sūryavatī had to rebuild the state's finances by taking charge herself. Eventually, the two princes died and stability returned as evidenced by Ananta's resumed interest in annexing neighbouring territories.

== Personal life ==
Ananta was married to Sūryavatī (or Subhata), the daughter of Kangra, who was king of Trigarta in the Kullu region. She was a Shaiva devotee and was known as a patron of many temples. When her husband committed suicide, she followed him to the grave.

== Death ==
Amanta had a son named Kalasha (or Kalsa) on 12 November 1040, whom Queen Sūryavatī attempted to place on the throne in 1063. The king proved unwilling to accept this and their relationship suffered as a result, leading to a feud that continued for nearly twenty years. One account states that Sūryavatī eventually persuaded her husband to abdicate in favour of their son. In 1063, when Ananta was deposed, his son treated him badly and suggested his father leave the palace and seek shelter in Parnotsa (now Poonch). This shattered the family, leading to Amanta thrusting a dagger through his abdomen and ending his life in 1068 AD. His wife performed sati, immolating herself on her husband's funeral pyre.
