= Damara =

Damara may refer to:

- Damara (people), Namibian people
- Damara (feudal landlord), landlords of ancient Kashmir
- Damara (Forgotten Realms), a fictional kingdom in the Forgotten Realms D&D campaign setting
- Damara, Central African Republic, a town
- Damara sheep, a breed of sheep
- Damara Megido, a character from the webcomic Homestuck (2009-2016)

== See also ==
- Damaraland, a region in Namibia inhabited by the Damara people
