= Lahore (disambiguation) =

Lahore is the capital and largest city of Punjab, Pakistan.

Lahore may also refer to:

== Places ==
=== Historical ===
- Lahore Subah, an administrative subdivision of the Mughal Empire in Punjab

=== Pakistan ===
==== Punjab ====
- Lahore District, a district in the central-eastern Punjab that contains the city of Lahore
- Lahore Division, an administrative division in Punjab
- Lahore Cantonment, a military-administered settlement
- Lahore Fort, a citadel in the city of Lahore
- Nawan Lahore, a small town in Toba Tek Singh District, situated near Gojra Tehsil at Jhang Road

==== Khyber Pakhtunkhwa ====
- Lahor, a town in Swabi District
- Lahor Tehsil, an administrative subdivision (tehsil) in Swabi District
- Lahor, Khyber Pakhtunkhwa, a village in the Federally Administered Tribal Areas of Pakistan

=== India ===
- Lohare, also Lahore, a village in Maharashtra, India

=== United States ===
- Lahore, Virginia, a small town in Orange County, Virginia in the United States

== In arts and entertainment ==
- Lahore (1949 film), a film directed by M. L. Anand
- Lahore (2010 film), a Bollywood sports film
- Lahore: A Sentimental Journey, a 1993 memoir book by Pran Nevile
- "Lahore" (song), a 2017 song by Guru Randhawa

== In government and politics ==
- 3rd (Lahore) Division, an infantry division of the British Indian Army, first organised in 1852
- Lahore Declaration, a bilateral agreement and governance treaty between India and Pakistan
- Lahore Front, battle in the Indo-Pakistani War of 1965
- Lahore Resolution, a formal political statement adopted by the All-India Muslim League
- Treaty of Lahore, a peace treaty marking the end of the First Anglo-Sikh War

== Other uses ==
- Lahore (pigeon)

== See also ==
- Lahore 1947, a 2026 Indian Hindi-language film about the partition of India by Rajkumar Santoshi
- Lohar, an ethnic group in Northern India, Pakistan, and Nepal
- Battle of Lahore (disambiguation)
- Siege of Lahore (disambiguation)
- Lahore bombing (disambiguation)
- Lohara (disambiguation)
