= Rajatarangini =

History book of Kashmir by Kalhana

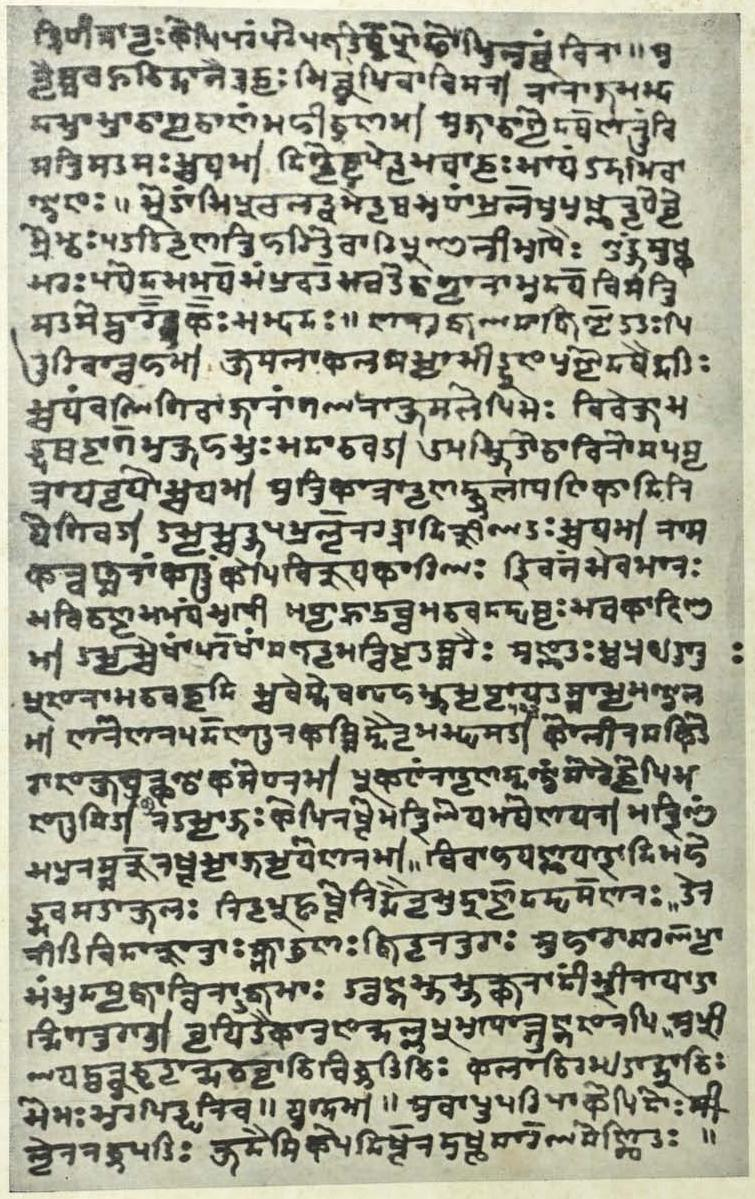
- Folio of a manuscript of the Rajatarangini by Kalhana, written in Sharada script
- Author: Kalhana
- Language: Sanskrit

Rājataraṅgiṇī (Sanskrit: राजतरंगिणी, romanized: rājataraṃgiṇī, lit. 'the wave of kings', Sanskrit pronunciation: [ɾɑː.d͡ʑɐ.t̪ɐˈɾɐŋ.ɡi.ɳiː]) is a metrical legendary and historical chronicle of the north-western part of the Indian subcontinent, particularly the kings of Kashmir. It was written in Sanskrit by Kashmiri historian Kalhana in the 12th century CE.

== List of kings ==
=== Book 1 : Gonanda dynasty (I) ===
The total reign of the following kings is mentioned as 1266 years.

Ruler	Notes
Gonanda I	Contemporary of Yudhishthira, a relative of Magadha's ruler Jarasandha (Jarasindhu) (I.59). He was killed by Balarama, the elder brother of Krishna.
Damodara I	Killed in a battle by Krishna.
Yashovati	Wife of Damodara. She was pregnant at the time of her husband's death, and Krishna helped her ascend the throne.
Gonanda II	Son of Yashovati and Damodara. Ruled as a minor over Kashmir during the Kurukshetra War. Killed by Parikshit.
35 kings (names lost)	A manuscript titled Ratnakar Purana supposedly contained these names and was translated into Persian by the orders of the later Muslim ruler Zain-ul-Abidin. The purported original manuscript as well as its translation are now lost. A Muslim historian named Hassan is said to have obtained a copy of the translation, and later Muslim historians provided a fabricated list of 35 names ending in -Khan.Some sources claim that after Gonanda II was killed, Parikshit handed over Kashmir to his second son Harnadeva. This gave rise to the Pandava Dynasty of Kashmir. Harnadeva lost a succession war against Janamejaya, and so he remained the King of Kashmir. The last ruler was Bhagavanta, who was defeated by Lava in 1752 BCE.
Lava	A descendant of Gonanda I, who belonged to the Naga Dynasty and defeated King Bhagavanta of the Pandava Dynasty of Kashmir in 1752 BCE. He laid the foundation of the Kashmira Naga Dynasty, a subdivision of the Gonanda Dynasty (I). He established a city named Lolora (Lolab) in Kashmir. According to the Rajatarangini, there were 84 lakh stone-walled houses in it.
Kusheshaya	Son of Lava
Khagendra	Son of Kushyendra
Surendra	Son of Khagendra. Surendra was the first Buddhist king of Kashmir who established the Buddhist culture of Saman culture in Kashmir.
Godhara	Belonged to a different family from Lava's dynasty (I.95)
Suvarna	Known for constructing a canal named Suvarnamani
Janaka	Unsuccessfully invaded Persia
Shachinara	Died childless
Ashoka	Great-grandson of Shakuni and son of Shachinara's first cousin. Built a great city called Shrinagara (near but not the same as the modern-day Srinagar). In his days, the mlechchhas (foreigners) overran the country, and he took sannyasa. According to Kalhana's account, this Ashoka would have ruled in the 2nd millennium BCE and was a member of the dynasty founded by Godhara. Kalhana also states that this king had adopted the doctrine of Jina, constructed stupas and Shiva temples, and appeased Bhutesha (Shiva) to obtain his son Jalauka. Despite the discrepancies, multiple scholars identify Kalhana's Ashoka with the Mauryan emperor Ashoka, who adopted Buddhism. Although "Jina" is a term generally associated with Jainism, some ancient sources use it to refer to the Buddha.
Jalauka (Jaloka)	A staunch Shaivite, who constructed several Shiva temples. He rid the country from the mlechchhas (foreigners, possibly Greco-Bactrians).
Damodara II	Devout Shaivite. Built a new city called Damodarasuda, and a dam called Guddasetu.
Hushka, Jushka, and Kanishka	Buddhist kings of Turashka origin (according to Kalhana). The third king is identified with Kanishka of the Kushan Empire.
Abhimanyu I	A Shaivite during whose reign Buddhists also flourished. Because of the rising Buddhist influence, people stopped following the Shaivite Nāga rites prescribed in the holy text Nilamata Purana. This angered the Nāgas, who heavily persecuted the Buddhists. To avoid this disorder, the king retired. A Brahmin named Chandradeva restored Shaivite rites by worshipping Shiva.

==== Gonanditya dynasty (I) ====
The Gonanda dynasty ruled Kashmir for 1002 years.

Ruler	Reign	Ascension year	Notes
Gonanda III	35 years	1182 BCE	Gonanda III founded a new dynasty. (I.191) He belonged to Rama's lineage, and restored the Nāga rites
Vibhishana I	53 years, 6 months	1147 BCE	
Indrajit	35 years	1094 BCE	
Ravana	30 years, 6 months	–	A Shivalinga attributed to Ravana could still be seen at the time of Kalhana.
Vibhishana II	35 years, 6 months	1058 BCE	
Nara I (Kinnara)	40 years, 9 months	1023 BCE	His queen eloped with a Buddhist monk, so he destroyed the Buddhist monasteries and gave their land to the Brahmins. He tried to abduct a Nāga woman, who was the wife of a Brahmin. Because of this, the Nāga chief burnt down the king's city, and the king died in the fire.
Siddha	60 years	983 BCE	Siddha, the son of Nara, was saved from the Nāga's fury because he was away from the capital at the time. He was a religious king and followed a near-ascetic lifestyle.
Utpalaksha	30 years, 6 months	923 BCE	Son of Siddha
Hiranyaksha	37 years, 7 months	893 BCE	Son of Utpalaksha
Hiranyakula	60 years	855 BCE	Son of Hiranyaksha
Vasukula (Mukula)	60 years	795 BCE	Son of Hiranyakula. During his reign, the Mlechchhas (possibly Hunas) overran Kashmir.
Mihirakula	70 years	735 BCE	According to historical evidence, Mihirakula's predecessor was Toramana. Kalhana mentions a king called Toramana, but places him much later, in Book 3. According to Kalhana, Mihirakula was a cruel ruler who ordered the killing of a large number of people, including children, women and elders. He invaded the Sinhala Kingdom and replaced their king with a cruel man. As he passed through Chola, Karnata and other kingdoms on his way back to Kashmir, the rulers of these kingdoms fled their capitals and returned only after he had gone away. On his return to Kashmir, he ordered the killing of 100 elephants, who had been startled by the cries of a fallen elephant. Once, Mihirakula dreamt that a particular stone could be moved only by a chaste woman. He put this to the test: the women who were unable to move the stone were killed, along with their husbands, sons and brothers. He was supported by some immoral Brahmins. In his old age, the king committed self-immolation.
Vaka (Baka)	63 years, 18 days	665 BCE	A virtuous king, he was seduced and killed by a woman named Vatta, along with several of his sons and grandsons.
Kshitinanda	30 years	602 BCE	The only surviving child of Vaka
Vasunanda	52 years, 2 months	572 BCE	"Originator of the science of love"
Nara II	60 years	520 BCE	Son of Vasunanda
Aksha	60 years	460 BCE	Son of Nara II
Gopaditya	60 years, 6 days	400 BCE	Son of Aksha. Gave lands to Brahmins. Expelled several irreligious Brahmins who used to eat garlic (non-Sattvic diet); in their place, he brought others from foreign countries.
Gokarna	57 years, 11 months	340 BCE	Son of Gopaditya
Narendraditya I (Khingkhila)	36 years, 3 months, 10 days	282 BCE	Son of Gokarna
Yudhisthira I	34 years, 5 months, 1 day	246 BCE	Called "the blind" because of his small eyes. In later years of his reign, he started patronising unwise persons, and the wise courtiers deserted him. He was deposed by rebellious ministers and granted asylum by a neighbouring king. His descendant Meghavahana later restored the dynasty's rule.

=== Book 2: Other rulers ===
No kings mentioned in this book have been traced in any other historical source. These kings ruled Kashmir for 192 years.

Ruler	Reign	Ascension year	Notes
Pratapaditya I	32 years	167 BCE	Pratapaditya was a relative of a distant king named Vikrmaditya (II.6). This Vikramaditya is not the same as the Vikramaditya of Ujjain, who is mentioned later as a patron of Matrigupta.
Jalauka	32 years	135 BCE	Son of Pratapaditya
Tungjina I	36 years	103 BCE	Shared the administration with his queen. The couple sheltered their citizens in the royal palace during a severe famine resulting from heavy frost. After his death, the queen committed sati. The couple died childless.
Vijaya	8 years	67 BCE	From a different dynasty than Tungjina.
Jayendra	37 years	59 BCE	Son of Vijaya: his "long arms reached to his knees". His flatterers instigated him against his minister Sandhimati. The minister was persecuted and ultimately imprisoned because of rumours that he would succeed the king. Sandhimati remained in prison for 10 years. In his old age, the childless king ordered the killing of Sandhimati to prevent any chance of him becoming a king. He died after hearing about the false news of Sandhimati's death.
Sandhimati alias Aryaraja	47 years	22 BCE	Sandhimati was selected by the citizens as the new ruler. He ascended the throne reluctantly, at the request of his guru Ishana. He was a devout Shaivite, and his reign was marked by peace. He filled his court with rishis (sages), and spent his time in forest retreats. Therefore, his ministers replaced him with Meghavahana, a descendant of Yudhishthira I. He willingly gave up the throne.

=== Book 3: Restored Gonandiya dynasty ===
Ruler	Reign	Ascension year	Notes
Meghavahana	34 years	25 CE	Possible coinage of Meghavahana. Circa 7th century CE, Kashmir. (Note: Obverse: Shiva Pashupati ("Lord of the Beasts"), making a mudra gesture with right hand and holding a filleted trident; behind, a lioness or tiger. Trace of the legend Meghana... in Brahmi. Reverse: Goddess seated facing on lotus, holding lotus in both hand, Kidara monogram to left, Jaya in Brahmi to right.) Meghavahana was the son of Yudhisthira I's great-grandson, who had been granted asylum by Gopaditya, the king of Gandhara. Meghavahana had been selected as the husband of a Vaishnavite princess at a Swayamvara in another kingdom. The ministers of Kashmir brought him to Kashmir after Sandhimati proved to be an unwilling king. Meghavahana banned animal slaughter and compensated those who earned their living through hunting. He patronised Brahmins and set up a monastery. His queens built Buddhist viharas and monasteries. He subdued kings in regions as far as the Sinhala Kingdom, forcing them to abandon animal slaughter.
Shreshtasena (Pravarasena I / Tungjina II)	30 years	59 CE	Son of Meghavahana
Hiranya and co-regent Toramana	30 years, 2 months	89 CE	Coin in the name of "Śrī Toramaņa", c. 6th century, Kashmir. Son of Shreshtasena, assisted by his brother and co-regent Toramana. The king imprisoned Toramana when the latter struck royal coins in his own name. Toramana's son Pravarasena, who had been brought up in secrecy by his mother Anjana, freed him. Hiranya died childless. Several coins of a king named Toramana have been found in the Kashmir region. This king is identified by some with Huna ruler Toramana, although his successor Mihirakula is placed much earlier by Kalhana.
Matrigupta	4 years, 9 months, 1 day	120 CE	According to Kalhana, the emperor Vikramaditya (alias Harsha) of Ujjayini defeated the Shakas and made his friend and poet Matrigupta the ruler of Kashmir. After Vikramaditya's death, Matrigupta abdicated the throne in favour of Pravarasena. According to D. C. Sircar, Kalhana has confused the legendary Vikramaditya of Ujjain with the Vardhana Emperor Harsha (c. 606–47 CE). The latter is identified with Shiladitya mentioned in Xuanzang's account. However, according to M. A. Stein, Kalhana's Vikramaditya is another Shiladitya mentioned in Xuanzang's account: a king of Malwa around 580 CE.
Pravarasena II	60 years	125 CE	Coinage in the name of "Pravarasena". Circa 6th-early 7th century CE, Kashmir. (Note: Obverse: Standing king with two figures seated below. Name "Pravarasena". Reverse: goddess seated on a lion. Legend "Kidāra".) Historical evidence suggests that a king named Pravarasena ruled Kashmir in the 6th century CE. According to Kalhana, Pravarasena subdued many other kings, in lands as far as Saurashtra. He restored the rule of Vikramaditya's son Pratapshila (alias Shiladitya), who had been expelled from Ujjain by his enemies. Pratapshila agreed to be a vassal of Pravarasena after initial resistance. He founded a city called Pravarapura, which is identified by later historians as the modern city of Srinagar on the basis of topographical details.
Yudhishthira II	39 years, 8 months	185 CE	Son of Pravarasena
Narendraditya I (Lakshmana)	13 years	206 CE	Son of Yudhishthira II and Padmavati
Ranaditya I (Tungjina III)	300 years	219 CE	Coinage in the name of "Sri Tujina". Circa 7th century CE, Kashmir. Younger brother of Narendraditya. His queen Ranarambha was an incarnation of Bhramaravasini. The Chola king Ratisena had found her among the waves during an ocean worship ritual.
Vikramaditya	42 years	519 CE	Son of Ranaditya
Baladitya	36 years, 8 months	561 CE	Younger brother of Vikramaditya. He subdued several enemies. An astrologer prophesied that his son-in-law would succeed him as king. To avoid this outcome, the king married his daughter Anangalekha to Durlabhavardhana, a handsome but non-royal man from the Ashvaghama Kayastha caste.

=== Book 4: Karkota dynasty ===
Ruler	Reign	Ascension year	Notes
Durlabhavardhana (Prajnaditya)	38 years	598 CE	Coin of Durlabhavardhana, founder of the dynasty. Obverse legend: Śri Durlabha. Reverse legend: Jayati Kidāra. Born to Nāga Karkota (a deity), Durlabhavardhana was Baladitya's officer in charge of fodder. Baladitya married his daughter Anangalekha to him. As the royal son-in-law, he became known as a just and wise man and was given the title "Prajnaditya" by the king. His wife Anangalekha became involved in an extramarital affair with the minister Kharga. Despite catching them sleeping together, Durlabhavardhana forgave Khankha and won over his loyalty. After Baladitya's death, Khankha crowned him the new king.
Durlabhaka (Pratapaditya II)	60 years	634 CE	Son of Durlabhavardhana and Anangalekha. He was adopted as a son by his maternal grandfather and assumed the title Pratapaditya after the title of the grandfather's dynasty.
Chandrapida (Vajraditya I)	8 years, 8 months	694 CE	Son of Durlabhaka and Shrinarendraprabha.
Tarapida (Udayaditya)	4 years, 24 days	703 CE	Younger brother of Chandrapida.
Muktapida (Lalitaditya I)	36 years, 7 months, 11 days	703 CE	Younger brother of Chandrapida and Tarapida. According to the historical evidence, Lalitaditya Muktapida ruled during the 8th century. Kalhana states that Lalitaditya Muktapida conquered the tribes of the north and after defeating the Kambojas, he immediately faced the Tusharas. The Tusharas did not fight but fled to the mountain ranges, leaving their horses on the battlefield. Then Lalitaditiya met the Bhauttas in Baltistan in western Tibet north of Kashmir, then the Daradas in Karakoram/Himalaya, the Valukambudhi and then he subdued Strirajya, the Uttar Kuru/Western China and the Pragjyotisha respectively (IV.165–175). According to some historians, Kalhana has highly exaggerated the military conquests of Muktapida.
Kuvalayapida	1 year, 15 days	739 CE	Son of Lalitaditya and Kamaladevi. His short reign was marked by a succession struggle with his half-brother Vajraditya II. He abdicated the throne and became a hermit to seek peace.
Vajraditya II (Bappiyaka / Vappiyaka / Lalitaditya II)	7 years	746 CE	Coin of king Vajraditya (Vigraha Deva) of the Karkota dynasty, c. 763–770 CE. Son of Lalitaditya and Chakramardika. He was a cruel and immoral person who introduced the evil habits of mlechchhas to Kashmir.
Prithivyapida I	4 years, 1 month	750 CE	Son of Vajraditya II and Mangjarika. Deposed by his half-brother Sangramapida.
Sangramapida I	7 days	750 CE	Son of Vajraditya II and Massa. Deposed his half-brother to become king, but died after a week.
Jayapida (Vinayaditya); Jajja	31 years; 3 years	781 CE	Youngest son of Vajradjtya II. He erected a monument at Prayaga, which existed at Kalhana's time. His wife Kalyanadevi was the daughter of Jayanta, the king of Pundravardhana in Gauda region. Jayapida subdued five kings of Gauda and made them vassals of his father-in-law. On his way back to Kashmir, he also defeated the king of Kanyakubja. While Jayapida was in Gauda, his brother-in-law usurped the throne in Kashmir. After three years of ruling Kashmir, Jajja was killed by Shrideva, a supporter of Jayapida. Jayapida became the king once again and patronised scholars. He waged wars against Bhimasena of the East and Aramuri of Nepala. In both instances, he was first imprisoned by the enemy king, but managed to escape and defeat the enemy. During the last years of his reign, he imposed excessive taxes on the advice of Kayasthas, and treated his subjects cruelly. He died because of a curse by a Brahmin.
Lalitapida	12 years	793 CE	Son of Jayapida and Durgi. He devoted his time to sensual pleasures and neglected royal duties.
Sangramapida II (Prithivyapida II)	7 years	805 CE	Son of Jayapida and Kalyana.
Chippatajayapida (Brhspati / Vrihaspati)	12 years	812 CE	Son of Lalitapida and his concubine Jayadevi. The actual power was in the hands of Jayadevi's brothers Padma, Utpalaka, Kalyana, Mamma and Dharmma.
Ajitapida	37 years	830 CE	Son of Lalitapida and Jayadevi, made king by his maternal uncle Utpalaka. Dethroned by Utpalaka's rival Mamma and the latter's son Yashovarman.
Anangapida	3 years	867 CE	Son of Sangramapida II. Made king by Mamma and Yashovarman.
Utpalapida	2 years	870 CE	Son of Ajitapida. Made king by Sukhavarman, the son of Utpala. Deposed by the minister Shura.

=== Book 5: Utpala dynasty (Part-I) ===
Ruler	Reign	Ascension year	Notes
Avantivarman		855 CE	Son of Sukhavarman. Made king by the minister Shura. Established the city of Avantipura
Shankaravarman		883 CE	According to Kalhana, this king "did not speak the language of the gods but used vulgar speech fit for drunkards, showed that he was descended from a family of spirit-distillers" (Stein's translation). This refers to the fact that the power had passed to the brothers of a queen, who was born in a family of spirit-distillers.
Gopalavarman	2 years	902 CE	Son of Shankaravarman; ruled with help of his mother Sugandha; Murdered
Sankata	10 days	904 CE	Brother of Gopalavarman, died soon after ascending the throne
Sugandha	2 years	904 CE	Became queen after the death of all male heirs. Deposed by Tantrin soldiers, who had earlier served as the royal bodyguards. Waged a war against the Tantrins with the help of their rivals (known as Ekanga), but was defeated and killed.
Partha		906 CE	10-year-old child of Nirjitavarman; placed on throne by the Tantrins
Nirjitavarman		921 CE	Half-brother of Avantivarman.
Chakravarman		922 CE	Purchased the throne from the Tantrins
Shuravarman I	1 year	933 CE	Purchased the throne from the Tantrins
Partha (2nd reign)		934 CE	Purchased the throne from the Tantrins
Chakravarman (2nd reign)		935 CE	Purchased the throne from the Tantrins
Shankaravardhana (or Shambhuvardhana)		935 CE	Purchased the throne from the Tantrins
Chakravarman (3rd reign)		936 CE	Defeated the Tantrins with help of Damara feudal lords. An unpopular king, he was killed.
Unmattavanti ("Mad Avanti")		937 CE	Son of Partha. Murdered his father and starved his half-brothers to death.
Shuravarman II		939 CE	Son of Unmattavanti

=== Book 6: Utpala dynasty (Part-II) ===
Ruler	Ascension year	Notes
Yashaskara-deva	939 CE	The nobles of Kashmir enthrone Yashaskara, from a 14th-century manuscript of the Jami' al-Tawarikh of Rashid al-Din Elected by a council of Brahmins
Varnata	948 CE	
Sangramadeva (Sanggrama I)	948 CE	Murdered by the divira (clerk or writer) Parvagupta, who had become a regent-minister
Parvagupta	948 CE	Strong but unpopular ruler
Kshemagupta	950 CE	Son of Parvagupta and husband of Didda (a member of the Lohara dynasty). Didda and/or her relatives ran the administration.
Abhimanyu II	958 CE	Ruled with his mother Didda as regent, aided by the minister Naravahana. Died young.
Nandigupta	972 CE	Didda's grandson, deposed by her
Tribhuvanagupta	973 CE	Didda's grandson, deposed by her
Bhimagupta	975 CE	Didda's grandson, deposed by her
Didda	980 CE	Wife of Kshemagupta After a young son of Yashaskara, Pravaragupta, a Divira (clerk), became king. His son Kshemagupta married Didda, daughter of Simharaja of Lohara. After ruling indirectly and directly, Didda (980–1003 CE) placed Samgrāmarāja, son of her brother, on the throne, starting the Lohara dynasty.

=== Book 7: First Lohara dynasty ===
Ruler	Reign	Ascension year	Notes
Sangramaraja (Samgramaraja / Kshamapati)		1003 CE	Nephew of Didda. Ascended the throne after her death, beginning Lohara dynasty's rule over Kashmir.
Hariraja	22 days	1028 CE	
Ananta-deva		1028 CE	Abdicated the throne in favour of his son, but retained power through his minister Haladhara
Kalasha (Ranaditya II)		1063 CE	Rebelled against his parents, leading to the suicide of his father Ananta, followed by sati-suicide by his mother. His son Harsha revolted against him and was imprisoned.
Utkarsha	22 days	1089 CE	Second son of Kalasha. His half-brother Vijaymalla rebelled against him and got Harsha released from prison. Utkarsha was imprisoned and committed suicide.
Harsha		died in 1101 CE	Harshadeva of Kashmir 1089–1101 CE In his early years, he was a sagacious king and a patron of art and literature. The later years of his reign were marked by unsuccessful military campaigns, resulting in excessive taxation and plundering of temples. Revolts by his generals Uchchala and Sussala (of the Lohara family) ended his reign. His son Bhoja was killed, and Harsha himself was killed by Uchchala's men while hiding in a village.

=== Book 8: Second Lohara dynasty ===
Ruler	Notes
Uchchala	Made his brother Sussala the ruler of Lohara. Murdered by Radda.
Radda (Shankharaja)	Usurped the throne, claiming to be a descendant of Yashaskara
Salhana	Uchchala's step-brother; became the king after Radda's death. The real power lay in the hands of a noble named Gargachandra. Salhana was deposed and imprisoned.
Sussala	Uchchala's brother; ascended throne with Gargachandra's support
Bhikshachara	Harsha's grandson, who had escaped Uchchala's revolt. Brought up by Naravarman, the king of Malava. Deposed Sussala.
Sussala (2nd reign)	Within 6 months of Bhikshachara's ascension, Sussala recovered his capital, leading to a civil war
Jayasimha (Sinha-deva)	Sussala's son. In the early years of his reign, the actual power was held by Sussala. Kalhana's account closes in the 22nd year of his reign.

== Evaluation ==
=== Literary ===
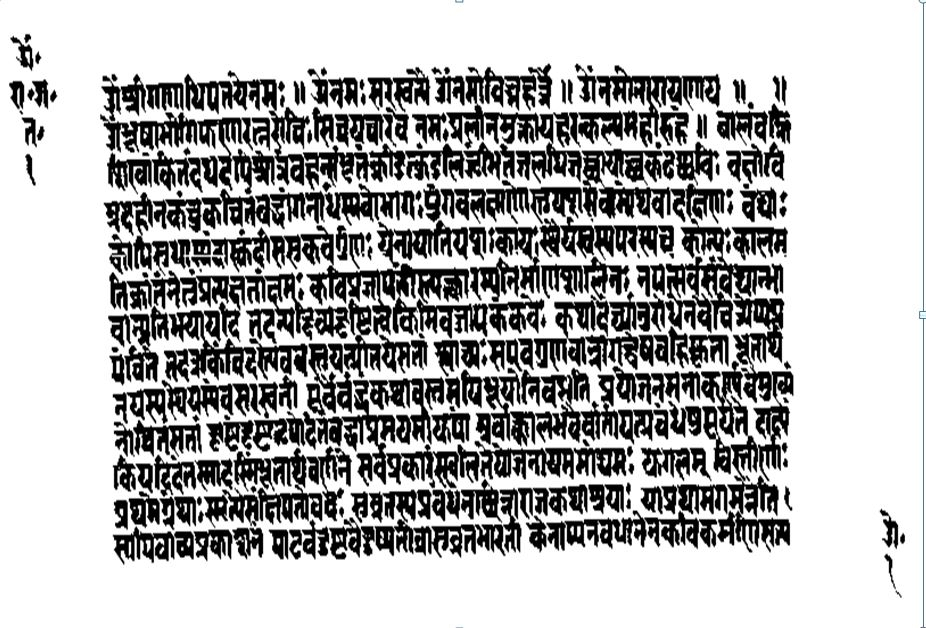
Folio of a manuscript of the Rajatarangini by Kalhana, scribed by Rājānaka Ratnakaṇṭha, ca.1648–49

Kalhana was an educated Sanskrit scholar, connected in the highest political circles. His writing is full of literary devices and allusions, concealed by his unique and elegant style.

=== Historical reliability ===
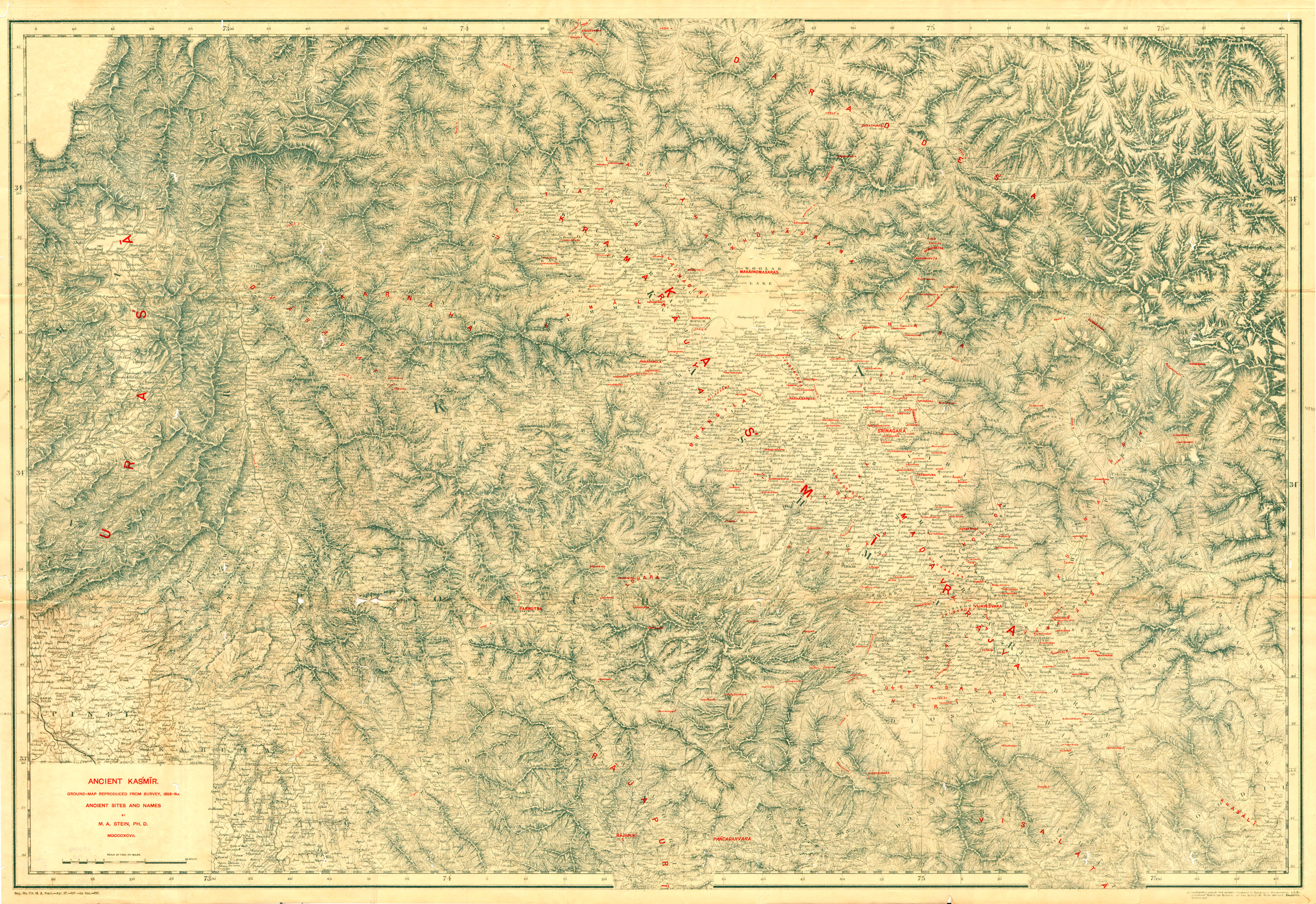
Map of Kashmir, Kalhana's Rajatarangini, A Chronicle of the Kings of Kashmir, Marc Aural Stein

Despite the value that historians have placed on Kalhana's work, there is little evidence of authenticity in the earlier books of Rajatarangini. For example, Ranaditya is given a reign of 300 years. Toramana is clearly the Huna king of that name, but his son Mihirakula is given a date 700 years earlier. Even where the kings mentioned in the first three books are historically attested, Kalhana's account suffers from chronological errors.

Kalhana's account starts to align with other historical evidence only by Book 4, which gives an account of the Karkota dynasty. But even this account is not fully reliable from a historical point of view. For example, Kalhana has highly exaggerated the military conquests of Lalitaditya Muktapida.

== Sequels ==
Dvitiya Rājataraṅgiṇī by Jonarāja
During the reign of Zain-ul-Abidin, Jōnarāja authored a sequel by the same name. Also known as Dvitīyā Rājataraṅgiṇī ("second Rajatarangini"), it gives an account of Kashmir from c. 1148 CE to 1459 CE.

Jaina-Rājataraṅgiṇī by Śrīvara
After Jonarāja's death in 1459, his disciple Śrīvara Paṇḍita continued his work. He titled his work Jaina-Rājataraṅgiṇī, and it is also known as Tṛtīyā Rājataraṅgiṇī ("third Rājataraṅgiṇī"). It gives an account of Kashmir from 1451 CE to 1486 CE.

Rājāvalipatākā by Prājyabhaṭṭa
Prājyabhaṭṭa's Rājāvalipatākā gave an account of Kashmir from 1486 to 1513. His work is lost.

Caturthī Rājataraṅgiṇī by Śuka
Śuka continued Prājyabhaṭṭa's lost work, resulting in the Caturthī Rājataraṅgiṇī ("fourth Rājataraṅgiṇī"). It begins after the end of Bhaṭṭa Prājya’s Rājāvalipatākā in 1513, while Fatḥ Šāh was still exercising his second reign, and ends in 1597 with the construction of the Naganagarī city fort just before Emperor Akbar’s third visit to Śrīnagara.

== Translations ==
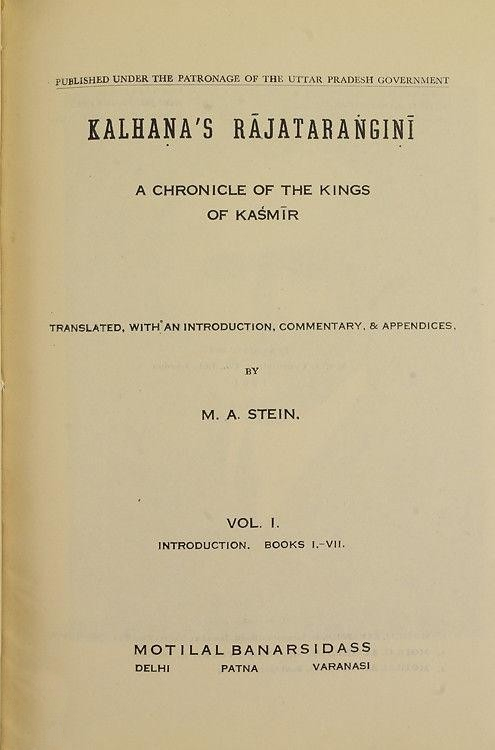
Translation of the Rajatarangini by Sir Aurel Stein (1900 edition).

A Persian translation of Rajatarangini was commissioned by Zain-ul-Abidin, who ruled Kashmir in the 15th century CE.

Horace Hayman Wilson partially translated the work and wrote an essay based on it, titled The Hindu History of Kashmir (published in Asiatic Researches Volume 15). Subsequent English translations of Kalhana's Rajatarangini include:

- Rajatarangini: The Saga of the Kings of Kashmir by Ranjit Sitaram Pandit (The Indian Press, Allahabad; 1935)
- Kings of Kashmira (1879) by Jogesh Chandra Dutt
- Kalhana's Rajatarangini: a chronicle of the kings of Kaśmir by Marc Aurel Stein
- In the Guise of Poetry — Kalhaṇa Reconsidered. In: Śāstrārambha. Inquiries into the Preamble in Sanskrit. Edited by Walter Slaje. Preface by Edwin Gerow. (AKM 62). Wiesbaden 2008: 207–244.
- Slaje, Walter (2014). Kingship in Kaśmīr (AD 1148–1459). From the Pen of Jonarāja, Court Paṇḍit to Sulṭān Zayn al-'Ābidīn (PDF). Studia Indologica Universitatis Halensis. Vol. 7. University of Halle-Wittenberg. Critically Edited by Walter Slaje with an Annotated Translation, Indexes and Maps.
- Slaje, Walter (2022). Kaschmir unter den Šāhmīrīden. Śrīvaras Jaina- und Rājataraṅgiṇī, A.D. 1451–1486. Studia Indologica Universitatis Halensis (in German). Vol. 20. University of Halle-Wittenberg. Four contemporary historical lives of rulers of an Indo-Persian sultanate. Newly published with annotated translation.
- Slaje, Walter (2023). Kaschmir im 16. Jahrhundert. Vom unabhängigen Sultanat zur moghulischen Annexion (Śukas Rājataraṅgiṇī, A. D. 1513–1597) (PDF). Studia Indologica Universitatis Halensis (in German). Vol. 27. University of Halle-Wittenberg. Republished with an annotated translation.

Translations in other languages include:

- Rajatarangini with Hindi commentary by Ramtej Shastri Pandey (Chaukhamba Sanskrit Pratishthan, 1985)
- Rajatarangini of Kalhana, edited by Vishwa Bandhu (1963–65); a later addition includes the texts of Jonaraja, Srivara and Suka (1966–67)
- Rajatarangini, Hindi translation by Pandit Gopi Krishna Shastri Dwivedi
- Histoire Des Rois Du Kachmir: Rajatarangini, French translation by M. Anthony Troyer
- Rajatarangini, Urdu translation by Pandit Thakar Acharchand Shahpuriah
- Rajatarangini, Telugu translation by Renduchintala Lakshmi Narasimha Sastry

== Adaptations ==
Several books containing legendary stories from Rajatarangini have been compiled by various authors. These include:

- S.L. Sadhu's Tales from the Rajatarangini (1967)
- Devika Rangachari's Stories from Rajatarangini: Tales of Kashmir (2001)
- Anant Pai's Amar Chitra Katha series:
  - Chandrapeeda and other Tales of Kashmir (1984)
  - The Legend of Lalitaditya: Retold from Kalhana's Rajatarangini (1999)

A television series based on Rajatarangini named Meeras began in 1986 in Doordarshan, Srinagar.

== See also ==
- Chach Nama, similar treatise about Sindh
