= Battle of Lahore =

Battle of Lahore may refer to the following battles in Lahore:

- Battle of Lahore (1241), during the Mongol invasions of India
- Battle of Lahore (1748), during the Mughal–Afghan Wars
- Battle of Lahore (1752), during the Mughal–Afghan Wars
- Battle of Lahore (1764), during the Afghan–Sikh Wars
- Capture of Lahore (1765), Afghan–Sikh Wars

== Indo-Pakistan War of 1965 ==
- Attacks near Icchogil Canal
- Battle of Burki
- Battle of Dograi
- Battle of Ichogil Bund

== See also ==
- Siege of Lahore (disambiguation)
- Lahore (disambiguation)
