= Jalauka =

- Nripa
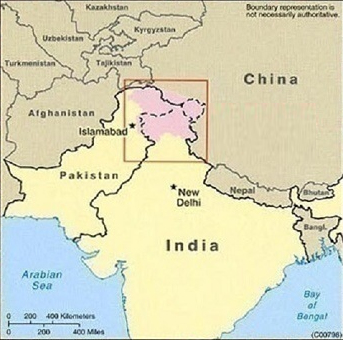

King of Kashmir
- Spouse: Isana-devi
- Father: Ashoka
- Religion: Hinduism

Jalauka (also known as Jaluka) was, according to the 12th century Kashmiri chronicle, the Rajatarangini, a King of Kashmir, who cleared the valley of oppressing Mleccha. Jaluka was reputed to have been an active and vigorous king of Kashmir, who expelled certain intrusive foreigners, and conquered the plains as far as Kannauj. Jalauka was devoted to the worship of the Hindu god Shiva and the Divine Mothers, in whose honour he and his queen, Isana-devi, erected many temples in places which can be identified.On Ashoka’s death his mighty empire had fragmented into as many as four or five regional kingdoms each ruled by his sons or grandsons, among them Jalauka in Kashmir, who reversed his father’s policies in favour of Shaivism and led a successful campaign against the Greco-Bactrian Kingdom, themselves seeking to take advantage of the power vacuum in north-west India to reclaim Taxila. According to Dwijendra Narayan Jha, the Rajatarangini associates Jalauka with the destruction of Buddhist monasteries. Aurel Stein's translation of the Rajatarangini infers that the king first appears in the work as an opponent of Buddhist worship, but is later converted to a more friendly attitude by divine intercession.

== Historicity ==
The story of Jalauka, notwithstanding the topographical details, is essentially legendary, and no independent corroboration of the Kashmir tradition has been discovered.

"In the Brahmi script of the Aśokan period, the name Kunala would be written thus, and the name Jalauka thus,. It is possible that after the invasion of the Bactrian Greeks and the Kuśāņas with their foreign names, a name such as Jalauka became accepted without much questioning."
—Romila Thapar (1963). Asoka and the Decline of the Mauryas.

Rajatarangini mentions that Jalauka's father and predecessor as Ashoka.

अथाऽशोककुलोत्पन्नोयद्वाऽन्याभिजनोद्भवः । भूमि दामोदरो नाम जुगोप जगतीपतिः ।।१५३॥

— Kalhana, Rajatarangini 1.143

Translation : Jalauka who born in the lineage of Ashok, become the father of a son named Damodara.

According to the dates given in that text, this Ashoka would have ruled in the 2nd millennium BCE, and was a member of a Mauryan Dynasty . Kalhana also states that this king appeased Bhutesha (Shiva) to obtain his son Jalauka. Multiple scholars identify Kalhana's Ashoka with the Mauryan emperor Ashoka, who had adopted Buddhism. Romila Thapar equates Jalauka to the Mauryan prince Kunala, arguing that "Jalauka" is an erroneous spelling caused by a typographical error in Brahmi script.

== Religion ==
- Ashoka

In Rajatrangani Ashoka was a truthful and spotless king, and a follower of Buddha. He also maintained his Shavite belief . He worshiped Lord Shiva for a son so after his worship Jalauka was born from his queen. Ashoka also built many Stupas and a Shiva temple in Kashmir -

सभायां विजयेशस्य समीपे च विनिर्ममे । शान्तावसादः प्रासादा अशोकेश्वर संज्ञिती ॥१०६॥

— Kalhana, Rajatarangini 1.103

Translation :Near the assembly hall of Vijayeshvara, the king Ashok built two Temples, which were called Ashokeshwara, free from any unrest..

शुष्क लेत्रवितस्तात्रौ तस्वार स्तूपमण्डलैः ॥१०२।।

— Kalhana, Rajatarangini 1.102

Translation : The king Ashoka adorned the dry and vacant land with stupas and mandalas.

- Jalauka

The Kalhana's Rajatarangini mentioned that Jalauka was very orthodox follower of Shaivism. He was intolerant toward Buddhism :-

तत्कालप्रबलप्रेद्धबौद्धवादिसमूह जित् अवधूतोऽभवत्सिद्धस्तस्य ज्ञानोपदेशकृत् ॥११२॥

— Kalhana, Rajatarangini 1.112

Translation :The teacher of victorious king Jalauka, defeated the powerful and arrogant group of Buddhists, became an accomplished sage, a teacher of knowledge.

== Origin ==
The Kalhana's Rajatarangini provide information about the clan of Jalauka -

महाशाक्यः स नृपतिर्न शक्यो बाधितुं त्वया। तस्मिन्दृष्टे तु कल्याणि भविता ते तमःक्षयः ॥१४१॥

— Kalhana, Rajatarangini 1.141

Translation : The great king Jalauka was not possible to be defeated by you, O Bhadra, the excited monks had thought to send me to your destruction. The Bodhisattvas summoned me. Thus, O Kashyani, this king is the great Shakya.

Further Kalhana mentioned that Ashoka ancestry belong to the lineage of Ikshuvaku Gandhara king Sakuni.
