= Lohar (surname) =

Lohar is a surname. Notable people with the surname include:

- Alam Lohar, prominent Pakistani Punjabi folk music singer
- Arif Lohar (born 1966), Pakistani singer
- Deepak Lohar, actor who mostly acts in Nagpuri and Hindi films
- Kayadu Lohar (born 2000), Indian actress and model
- Nizam Lohar (1835 — 1877), dacoit who rebelled against the colonial government
- Dalbir Singh Lohar, Indian Freedom fighter
- Tribhuvandas Luhar - Gujarati Poet

== See also ==
- Lohar (caste)
- Lohar (disambiguation)
