= Siege of Lahore =

Siege of Lahore may refer to the following military sieges of Lahore:

- Siege of Lahore (1186), part of the Ghurid campaigns in India
- Siege of Lahore (1241), part of the Mongol invasions of India
- Siege of Lahore (1761), part of the Afghan–Sikh Wars

== See also ==
- Battle of Lahore (disambiguation)
- Lahore (disambiguation)
