= Lohar, Punjab =

Lohar
- Village
- Location in Punjab, India Lohar (India)
- Coordinates: 31.2425491°N 75.5240699°E
- Country: India
- State: Punjab
- District: Jalandhar

Government
  - Type: Panchayat raj
  - Body: Gram panchayat
- Elevation: 240 m (790 ft)

Languages
  - Official: Punjabi
- Time zone: UTC+5:30 (IST)
- ISO 3166 code: IN-PB
- Vehicle registration: PB- 08
- Website: jalandhar.nic.in

Lohar is a village in Jalandhar district of Punjab State, India. It is located 12 kilometres (7.5 mi) from district headquarter Jalandhar and 161 kilometres (100 mi) from state capital Chandigarh. The village is administrated by a sarpanch who is an elected representative of village as per Panchayati raj (India).

== See also ==
- List of villages in India
