= Lohara, Nalanda =

Coordinates: 25°21′16″N 85°34′18″E

Lohara is a panchayat village in Harnaut Tehsil, Nalanda District, in the state of Bihar, India. Lohara is located 6.5 km by road east of Harnaut, the tehsil headquarters, and 28 km by road north of Bihar Sharif.

There are four villages in the Lohara gram panchayat: Lohara, Kichni, Patasia, and Phalhanwan.

== Demographics ==
In the 2001 India census, the village of Lohara had a population of 3,425 with 1,801 males (52.6%) and 1,624 females (47.4%), for a gender ratio of 902 females per thousand males.
