= Lohra =

Lohra may refer to:

- Lohra, Bihar, India
- Lohra, Germany
  - Lohra (megalithic tomb), near Lohra, Germany
- Lohra (tribe), a tribe and social community in Jharkhand, India
- Lohra, a panchayat in Padwa block, Palamu, Jharkhand, India
