= Lahor, Khyber Pakhtunkhwa =

Lahor
- Location within Pakistan
- Coordinates: 34.28°N 71.17°E
- Country: Pakistan
- Province: Federally Administered Tribal Areas
- Elevation: 681 m (2,234 ft)
- Time zone: UTC+5 (PST)

Lahor is a village in the Federally Administered Tribal Areas of Pakistan. It is located at 34°28'41N 71°17'27E with an altitude of 681 metres (2237 feet).
