= Lohara, Munger =

Lohara
- Village
- Location in Bihar, India Lohara (India)
- Coordinates: 25.0954871°N 86.5740567°E
- Country: India
- State: Bihar
- District: Munger
- Subdivision: Haveli Kharagpur
- Elevation: 48 m (157 ft)

Population (2011)
  - Total: 2,000

Languages
  - Official: Angika, Magahi, Hindi
- Time zone: UTC+5:30 (IST)
- Postal code: 811213

Lohara is a village in Munger District, in the state of Bihar, India. Administratively it is under Bangama gram panchayat, Tetia Bambar Tehsil of Munger District. Lohara is located 9.5 km by road southeast of Kharagpur and 47 km by road south of Munger.

== Demographics ==
In the 2001 India census, the village of Lohara had a population of 779, with 429 males (55.1%) and 350 females (44.9%), for a gender ratio of 816 females per thousand males.
