= Lohare =

Village in Maharashtra

- village
- Location in Maharashtra, India Lohare (India)
- Coordinates: 19.6358°N 74.3894°E
- Country: India
- State: Maharashtra
- District: Ahmadnagar
- Taluka: Sangamner

Government
  - Body: Village Panchayat

Languages
  - Official: Marathi
- Time zone: UTC+5:30 (IST)
- Lok Sabha constituency: Shirdi
- Vidhan Sabha constituency: Sangamner

Lohare is a village in Sangamner Taluka in Ahmednagar District of Maharashtra State, India. The native language of Lohare is Marathi. Lohare Village Total population is 2363 and number of houses are 433. Female Population is 48.6%. Village literacy rate is 65.7% and the Female Literacy rate is 28.1%.
