= Damara (feudal landlord) =

A damara was a feudal landlord of ancient Kashmir.

Kashmiri society was organised somewhat differently from other areas of India in which Hinduism flourished, this being due to the influence that Buddhism came to have from the time of the reign of Asoka around the third century BC. The more common social and economic demarcation lines of varna - a ritual ranking system comprising Brahmin, Kshatriya, Vaishya and Shudra - became blurred, with the exception of that between the Brahmins and all other Hindus. Instead, it was occupation that formed the primary differentiator and of the occupations it was that of agriculture which was most important.

As landholders and agriculturalists, the damaras were the most important of the occupational classes and their power could be considerable. It was in part as a consequence of their many disputes with the kings of the Lohara dynasty, during a prolonged period of corruption, internecine fighting and misrule, that the region eventually passed into control by Muslim rulers. Mohibul Hassan described that

The Dãmaras or feudal chiefs grew powerful, defied royal authority, and by their constant revolts plunged the country into confusion. Life and property were not safe, agriculture declined, and there were periods when trade came to a standstill. Socially and morally too the court and the country had sunk to the depths of degradations.

Present day Kashmiri Dar tribe is considered the surviving descendant of Damaras.
