= Kalhana =

Kashmiri poet and chronicler

Kalhana (c. 12th century) was the author of Rajatarangini (River of Kings), an account of the history of Kashmir. He wrote the work in Sanskrit between 1148 and 1149. All information regarding his life has to be deduced from his own writing, a major scholar of which is Mark Aurel Stein. Robin Donkin has argued that with the exception of Kalhana, "there are no [native Indian] literary works with a developed sense of chronology, or indeed much sense of place, before the thirteenth century".

== Life ==
Kalhana was born in a Hindu Brahmin family to a Kashmiri minister, Chanpaka, who probably served king Harsha of the Lohara dynasty. It is possible that his birthplace was Parihaspore and his birth would have been very early in the 12th century. The introductory verses to each of the eight Books in his Rajatarangini are prefaced with prayers to Shiva, a Hindu deity. In common with many Hindus in Kashmir at that time, he was also sympathetic to Buddhism, and Buddhists tended to reciprocate this feeling towards Hindus. Even in relatively modern times, Buddha's birthday has been a notable event for Kashmiri Brahmins and well before Kalhana's time Buddha had been accepted by Hindus as an avatar of Vishnu.

Kalhana was familiar with earlier epics such as the Vikramankadevacharita of Bilhana, the Ramayana and the Mahabharata, to all of which he alludes in his own writings. However, his own writings did not employ what Stein has described as "the very redundant praise and flattery which by custom and literary tradition Indian authors feel obliged to bestow on their patrons". From this comes Stein's deduction that Kalhana was not a part of the circle surrounding Jayasimha, the ruling monarch at the time when he was writing the Rajatarangini.

== See also ==
- Dynasties of Ancient Kashmir
- Historiography of India

== Bibliography ==
- Stein, Mark Aurel (1989) [1900]. Kalhana's Rajatarangini: a chronicle of the kings of Kasmir, Volume 1 (Reprinted ed.). Motilal Banarsidass. ISBN 978-81-208-0369-5.
- Stein, Mark Aurel (1989) [1900]. Kalhana's Rajatarangini: a chronicle of the kings of Kasmir, Volume 2 (Reprinted ed.). Motilal Banarsidass. ISBN 978-81-208-0370-1.
- Donkin, Robin A. (1998). "Beyond price: pearls and pearl-fishing: origins to the age of discoveries". Memoirs of the American Philosophical Society. 224. American Philosophical Society. ISBN 978-0-87169-224-5.
