= New Theed =

New Theed نیو تھید
- Location in Jammu and Kashmir New Theed (India)
- Coordinates: 34°9′51″N 74°54′35″E
- Country: India
- Union Territory: Jammu and Kashmir
- District: Srinagar district
- Resettlement: 1940-1942
- Elevation: 1,700.0 m (5,577.4 ft)

Languages
  - Official: Kashmiri, Urdu, English
- Time zone: UTC+5:30 (IST)
- Postal Code: 191121
- Telephone code: 0194
- Vehicle registration: JK
- Website: srinagar.nic.in

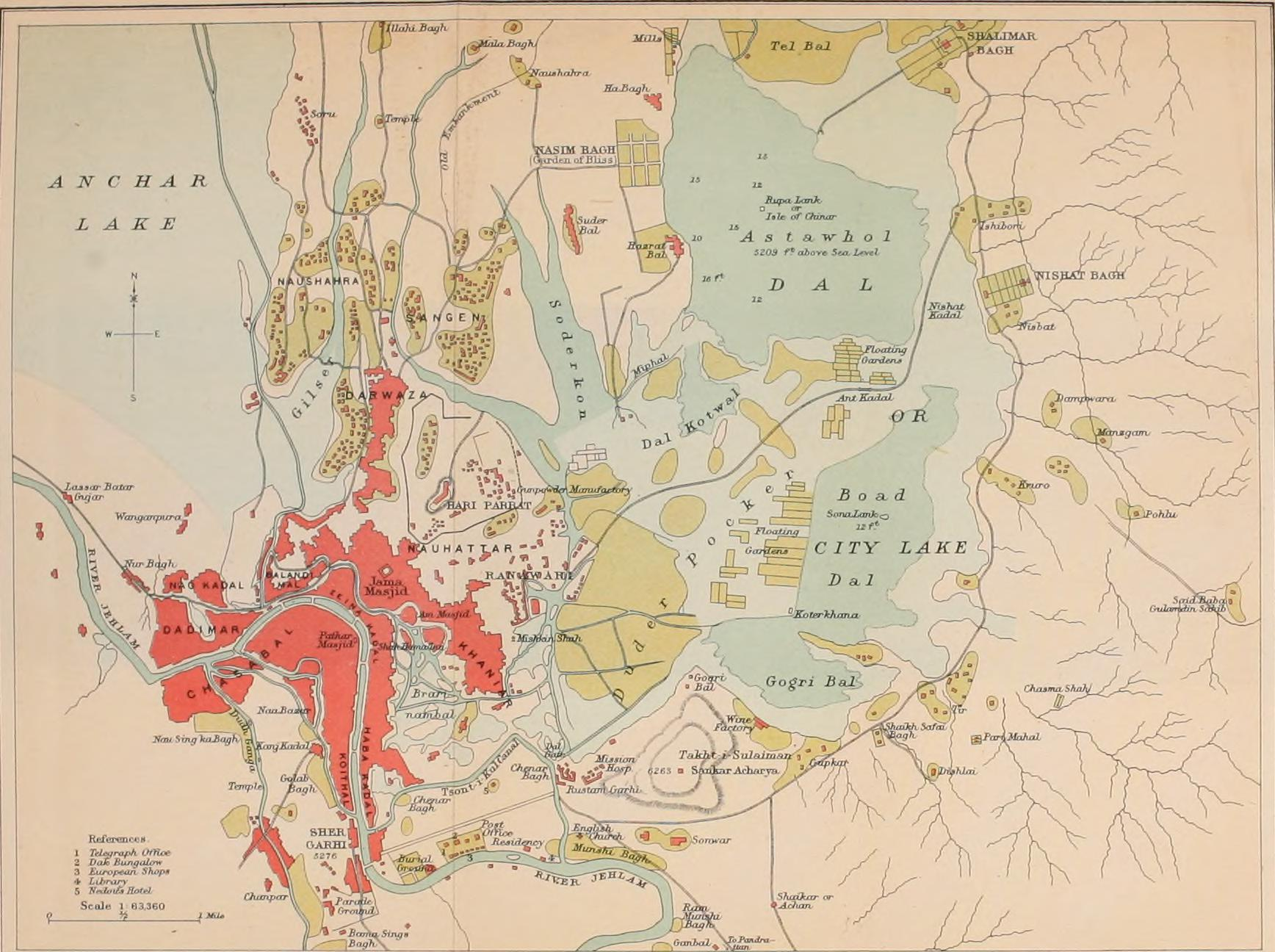
Srinagar and Environ map 1911. The name "Tir" is mentioned which presents the old location of the Residents of this area.

New Theed is a notified area in Srinagar city in the Kashmir Valley of Jammu and Kashmir, India known for its historical significance and natural surroundings.

The people of New Theed are actually from 'Chasma Shahi (Old Theed). And were resettled to the current new theed somewhere between 1940 and 1942 by Maharaja Hari Singh. Quoting my grandmother's statement, she says, "We had houses and properties there, but then the Maharaja sent us here."

== Location ==
It is located about 20km from Srinagar city center. It is a well-known tourist attraction within the city. The gateway to the Dachigam National Park. The base point for undertaking trekking to the adjacent Mahadev Mountain peak. The land's topography is mountainous and is enclosed by Dachigam National Park on the east side. From the south side, there is the famous Harwan Garden below the foothills of the Zabarwan Range, which is also the entry point to the area. It hosts the Heritage Chestnut Garden and a Sericulture nursery. There is also a branch unit of Jammu and Kashmir Bank along with an ATM service.

== History ==
The history of Haripora Harwan, commonly known as New Theed, dates back to the 1940s. According to the speech delivered by the well-known historian and expert on vedic scriptures and philosophy, Professor Triloki Nath Ganjoo, the word "Theed" is the altered form of the original word "/θɪrɑː ðrə/" (phonetic transcription) mentioned in Sharada Script. This place is mentioned in the Sharada Script with special reference to the incident with one of the Hindu goddesses, Zeashta Devi during the Vedic era. In 1940–1942, the Dogra Ruler, Hari Singh, forced the mass migration of people from their homeland old Theed, the present-day Chashma Shahi, Botanical Garden, Royal Springs Golf Course, Raj Bhavan, and Hari-Niwas. During the mass migration process, people resettled in different areas of Kashmir like Nishat-Zithyar, Brein, Pampore, Gupt Ganga Ishber, Khunmoh, Zakura, Hazratbal, Islamabad, Sarnal Anantnag, Satoora Tral, Pantha-chowk, Lasjan, and Nowgam. However, the majority of the people preferred to stay in the New Theed, which was allotted to them by the government as a substitute land without any monetary compensation or any other benefits. Hari Singh set up the revenue settlement committee that included Prithvi Nath (Tehsildar), Nurjin Nath, Gopi Nath (Naib Tehsildar), Badri Nath, Sadurdin, Ahmad Syed, Pundit Lasa Bhat, Patwaris (village accountant) at the time of migration. On a local level, Ghulam Ahmad Bhat S/O Abdul Salam Bhat facilitated the entire process. Ghulam Mohammad Bhat S/O Ghulam Ahmad Bhat and Mohammad Akbar Hajam rendered their duties as the Jareeb-Kash (Land Surveyor). Other Government officers who were part of the resettlement process included Abdul Hamid Banihali and M. M. Sidique, the Financial Commissioner. Each household was proposed to be given 2 Kanals of land for every 1 Kanal of land owned at Old-Theed, with a proper land revenue record. However, the proposal has not been implemented so far. During migration, no rehabilitation process was adopted, depriving its inhabitants of their fundamental rights. To get genuine compensation and registration of the land record in favour of the inhabitants of New Theed, the village Awaqaf Committee initiated a court petition that is still pending in the court.

== Geography of Old Theed ==
The hamlet of Old-Theed was located on the banks of Dal Lake, with the Zabarwan Mountains as its backdrop. It is almost 6 km away from city centre. This place offers views of the Dal-Lake, Hariparbat, and the Boulevard Road. Nearby points of interest include the Botanical Garden, Chashma Shahi, Pari Mahal, and Takht-i-Sulaiman /Shankaracharya Temple

Mohallas

- Makan Mohalla
- Gania-Pora
- Zithyar
- Gupkar Sunar-Bagh
- Darbagh
- Chesma-Shahee
- Bhat Mohalla
- Chani Mohalla
- Naveech Mohalla
- Shah Mohalla
- Nowpora-Baghi Kushi

== Waqf Property At Old Theed ==
As per the revenue record, there are approximately 446 Kanals and 14 Marla Waqf land, including the following structures.

Masajid

- Chare Masjid
- Panyaar Masjid
- Sonarbagh Masjid
- Darbagh Masjid
- Chesmashee Masjid
- Novpora Masjid (also known as Baba Azim Masjid)

Shrines

- Shrine of Azim Bab Sahab R.A
- Sayed Sahab R.A
- Asim Sahab and Qasim Sahab R.A

== See also ==
- Dachigam National Park
- Mahadev Peak
- Chashme Shahi
- Royal Springs Golf Course, Srinagar
- Nishat
