= Royal Springs Golf Course =

Golf course in Srinagar, Kashmir

Coordinates: 34°5′18.04″N 74°52′15.5″E

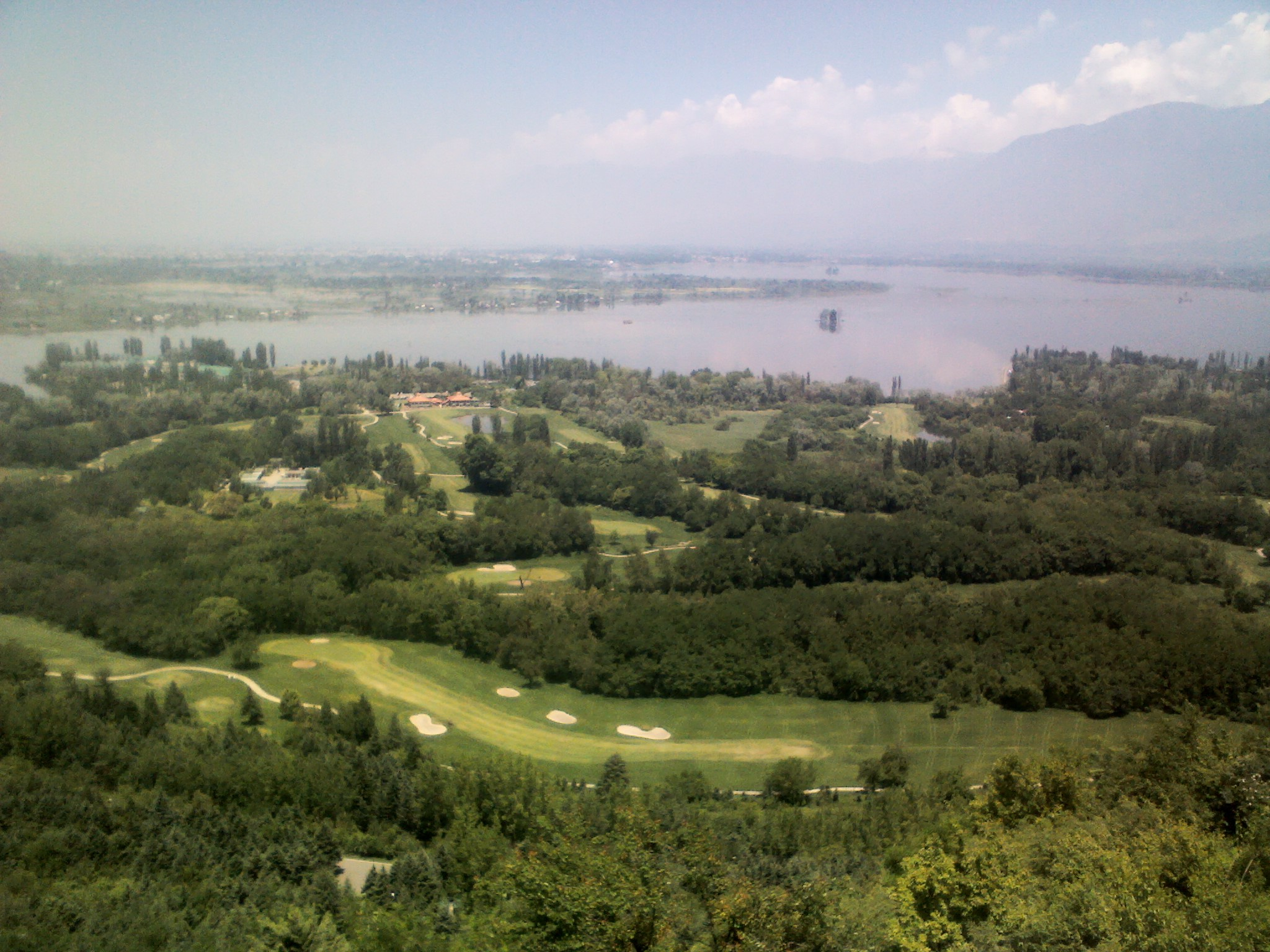
- Royal Springs Golf Course Srinagar
- Interactive map of Royal Springs Golf Course

Club information
- Location: Chashme Shahi, Srinagar, Kashmir
- Owner: JKTDC
- Operator: JKTDC
- Total holes: 18
- Designed by: Robert Trent Jones Jr.
- Par: 72
- Length: 6,387 m (6,985 yd)

The Royal Springs Golf Course is a public golf course located near Chashme Shahi overlooking Dal Lake in Srinagar, Kashmir.

== History ==
The Royal Springs Golf Course, initially locality of Old Theed as In 1940–1942, the Dogra Ruler, Hari Singh, ordered the mass migration of people from their homeland old Theed, the present-day Chashma Shahi, Botanical Garden, Royal Springs Golf Course, Raj Bhavan, and Hari-Niwas after that a part of which was converted into Salim Ali National Park, which situated at the foothills of Zabarwan mountains overlooking Dal Lake, it is managed by Jammu and Kashmir Tourism Development Corporation, a quasi-government institution. The Royal Springs Golf Course, commissioned in 2001, is designed by the American golfer Robert Trent Jones Jr. It is regarded as one of the most picturesque golf course in Asia and has quality amenities like motorised golf carts etc. It is considered as No.1 golf course of India by Golf Digest. This golf course is open to non-members also (not restricted to members only). Golf tournaments are conducted at regular intervals. The first ever women's golf tournament conducted at Srinagar valley was arranged in this course in July 2012, which attracted more than 50 female golfers across India.

Overlooking the golf course, in the hillside, is a heritage structure named Paree Mahal built by Prince Dara Shikoh, son of Emperor Shah Jahan during the Mughal period.

=== Cork oaks groove ===
The golf course harbors a rare groove of cork oaks, planted by last Dogra maharaj, Hari Singh, before 1947, the plants were imported from Europe. Cork had demand then, mostly for closing bottles, and the cork oaks and other trees escaped felling at the time of construction of the golf course.

== See also ==
- Gulmarg Golf Club
