= Boulevard =

Wide road with buildings on sides

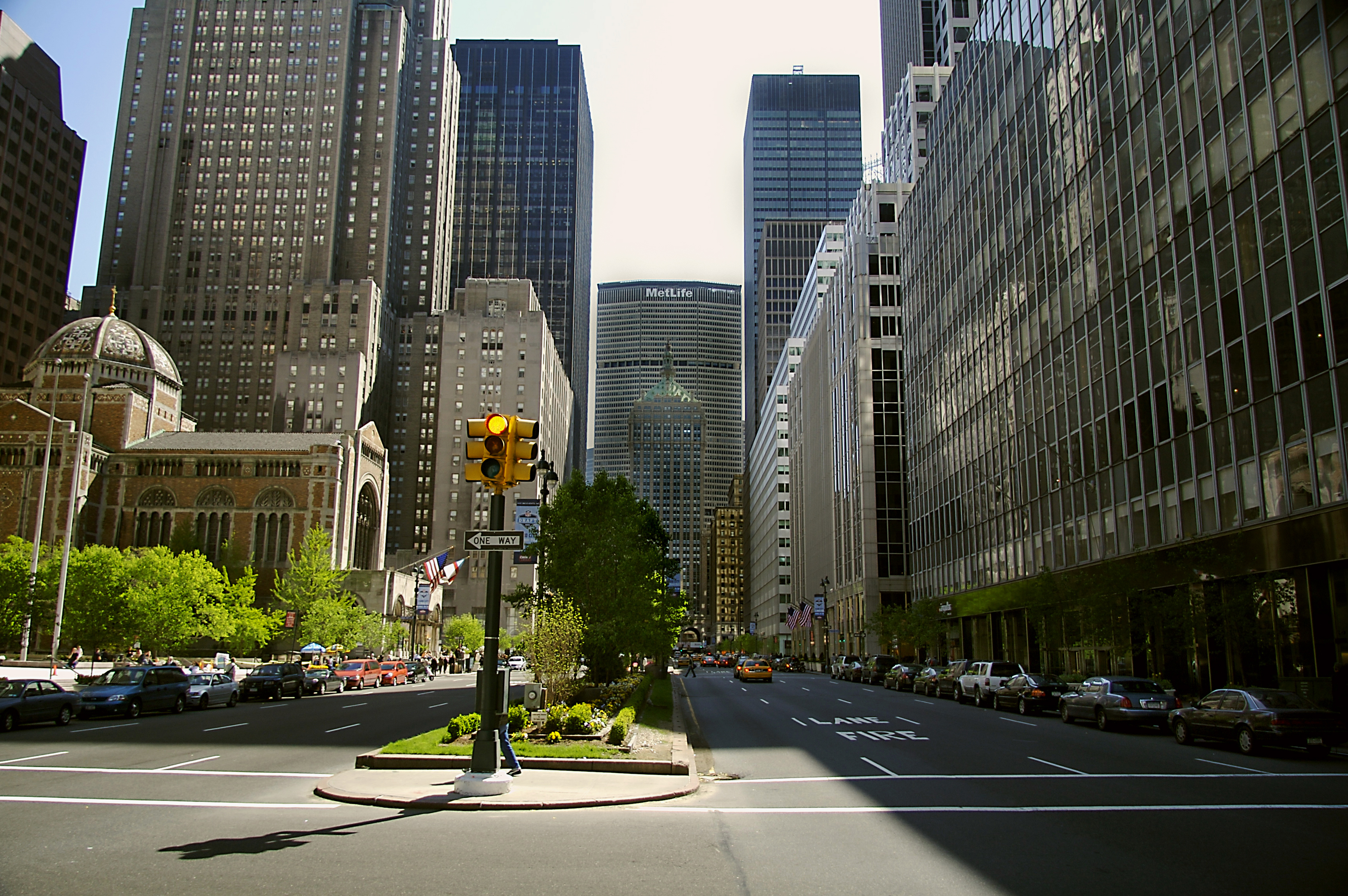
Park Avenue in Midtown Manhattan, United States

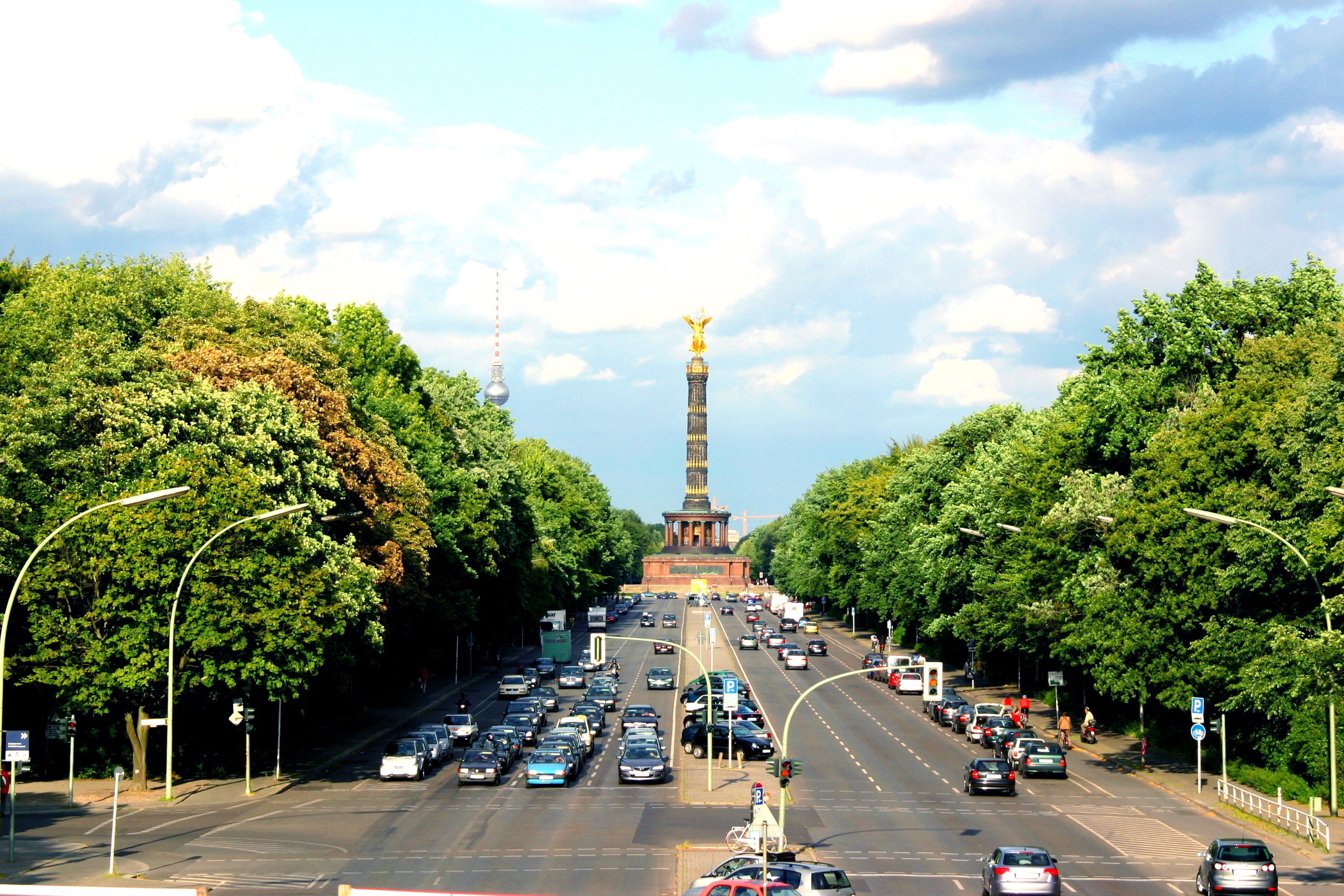
The Straße des 17. Juni in Berlin, Germany

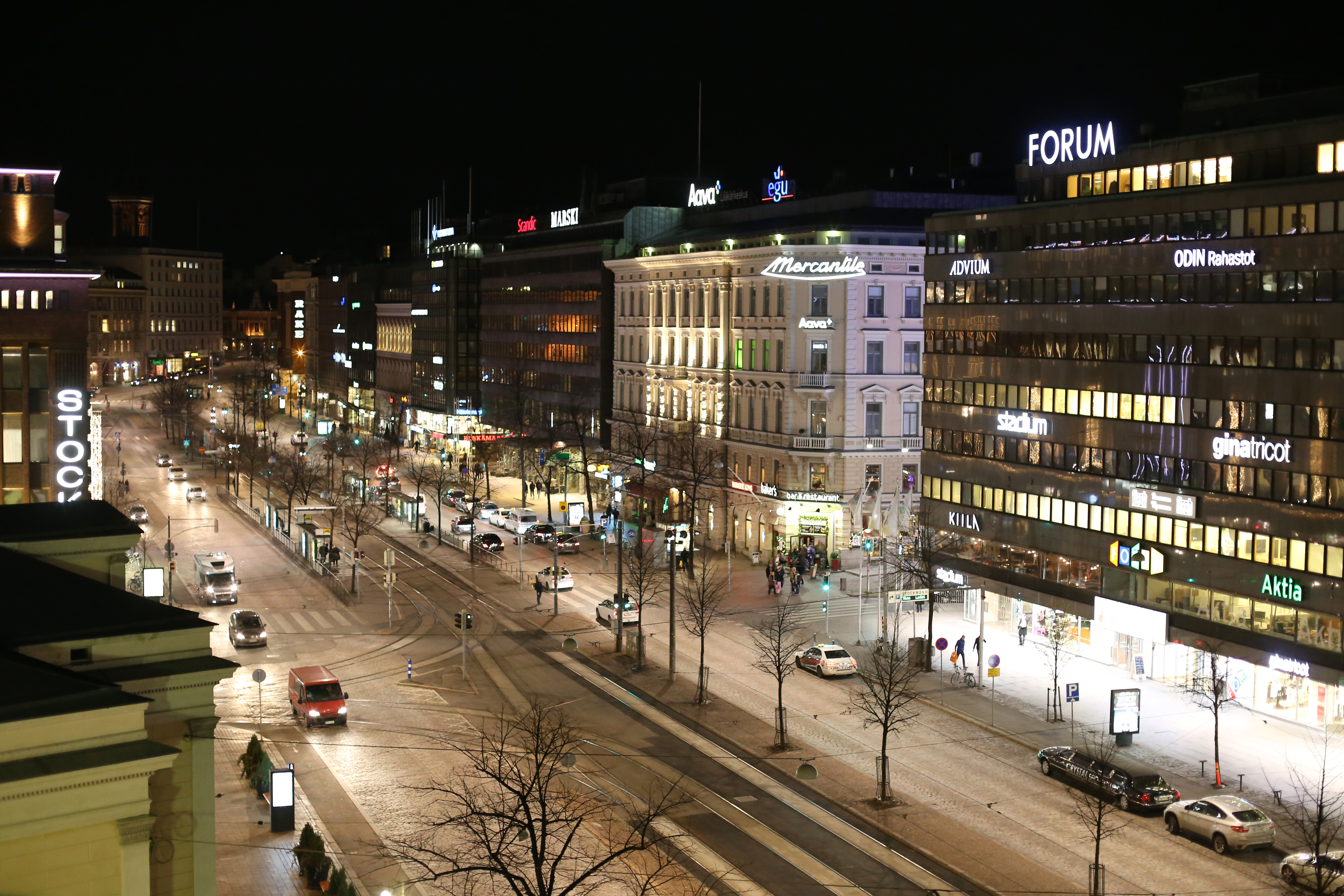
Mannerheimintie in Helsinki, Finland

Beihuan Boulevard in Shenzhen, China

A boulevard is a type of broad avenue planted with rows of trees, or in parts of North America, any urban highway or wide road in a commercial district.

In Europe, boulevards were originally circumferential roads following the line of former city walls.

In North American usage, boulevards may be wide, multi-lane thoroughfares divided with only a central median.

== Etymology ==
The word boulevard is borrowed from French. In France, it originally meant the flat surface of a rampart, and later a promenade taking the place of a demolished fortification. It is a borrowing from the Dutch word bolwerk 'bulwark'.

== Notable examples ==
=== Asia ===
==== Azerbaijan ====
- Baku Boulevard

==== Bangladesh ====
- Manik Mia Avenue

==== Cambodia ====
- Norodom Boulevard
- Monivong Boulevard
- Sihanouk Boulevard
- Xi Jinping Boulevard

==== India ====
- M G Road
- Anna Salai
- Indira Gandhi Sarani
- Marine Drive
- Krishnaraja Boulevard
- Rajpath
- Necklace Road
- Mahatma Gandhi Road
- Foreshore Road

==== Indonesia ====
- Jalan Jenderal Sudirman
- Jalan M.H. Thamrin
- Jalan Jenderal Gatot Subroto
- Jalan H.R. Rasuna Said
- Jalan Gajah Mada/Jalan Hayam Wuruk
- Jalan Prof. Dr. Satrio
- Jalan Plaza Boulevard

==== Vietnam ====
- Thang Long Boulevard

==== Iran ====
- Keshavarz Boulevard

==== Philippines ====
- Roxas Boulevard
- Shaw Boulevard
- España Boulevard
- Quezon Boulevard
- Aurora Boulevard
- Osmeña Boulevard
Boulevards of Asia
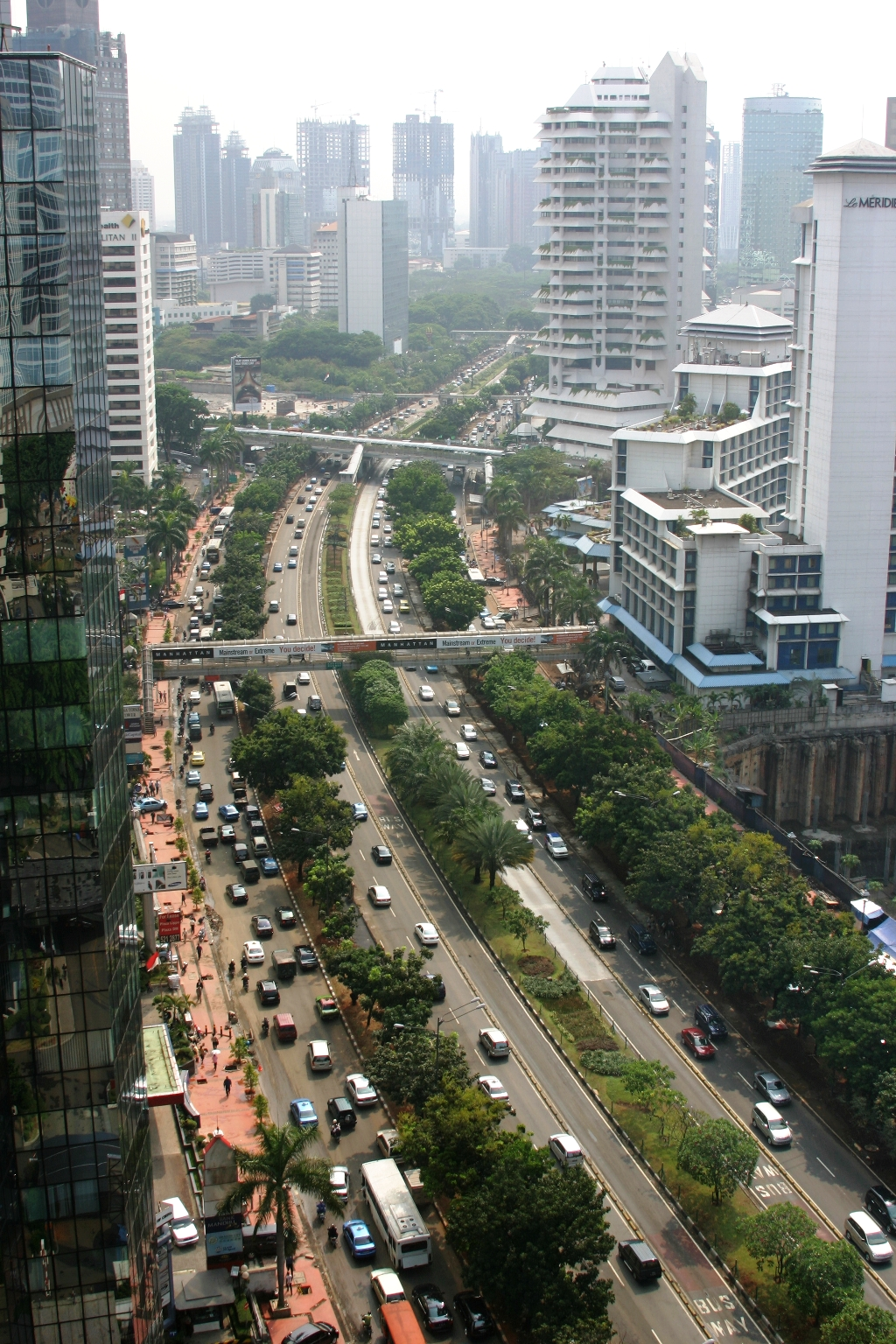
Jalan Jenderal Sudirman in Jakarta

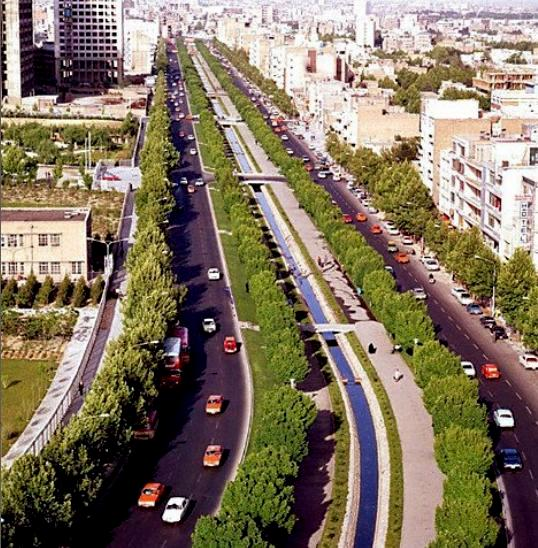
Keshavarz Boulevard of Tehran in mid 1970s

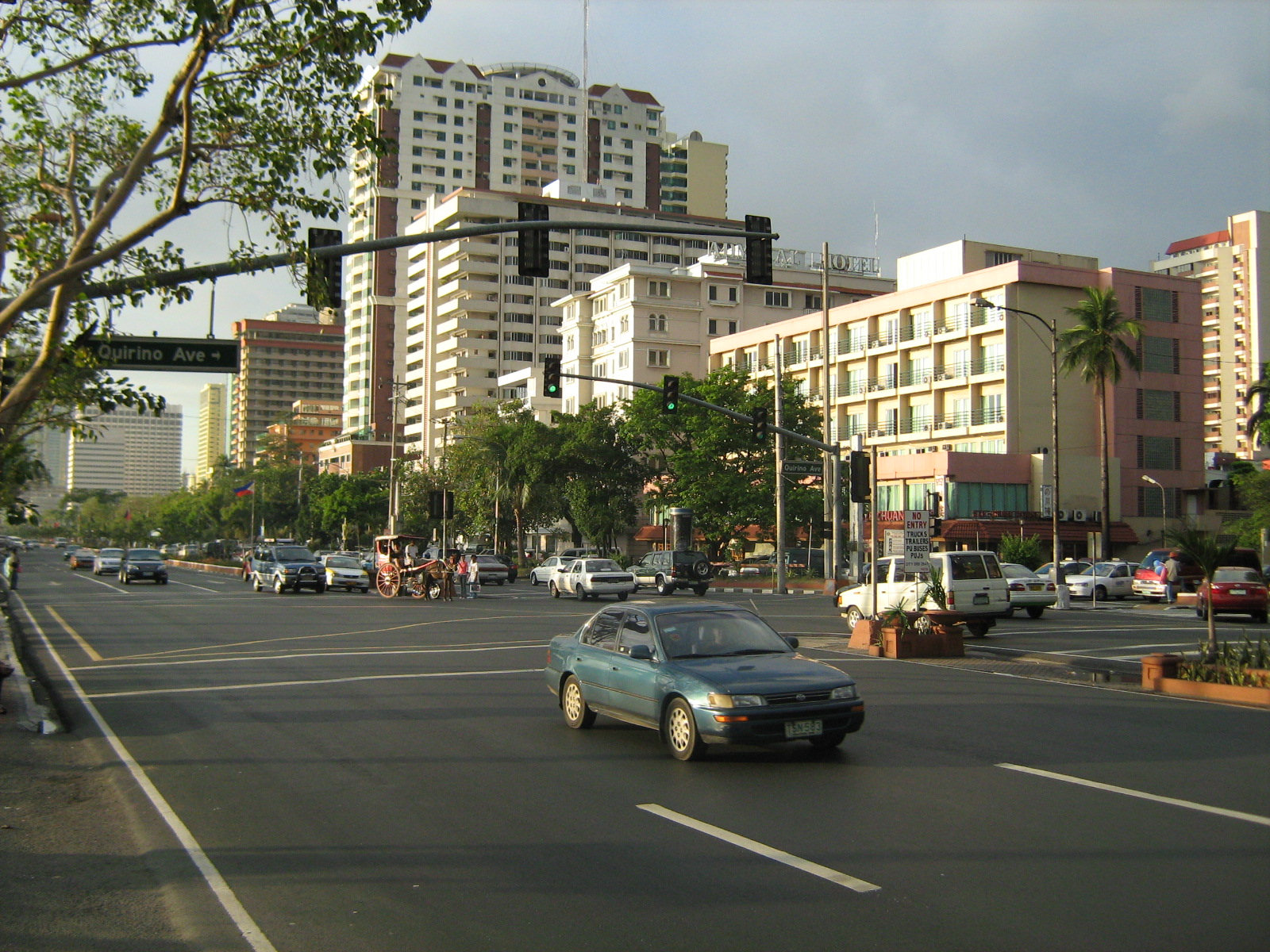
Roxas Boulevard in Manila

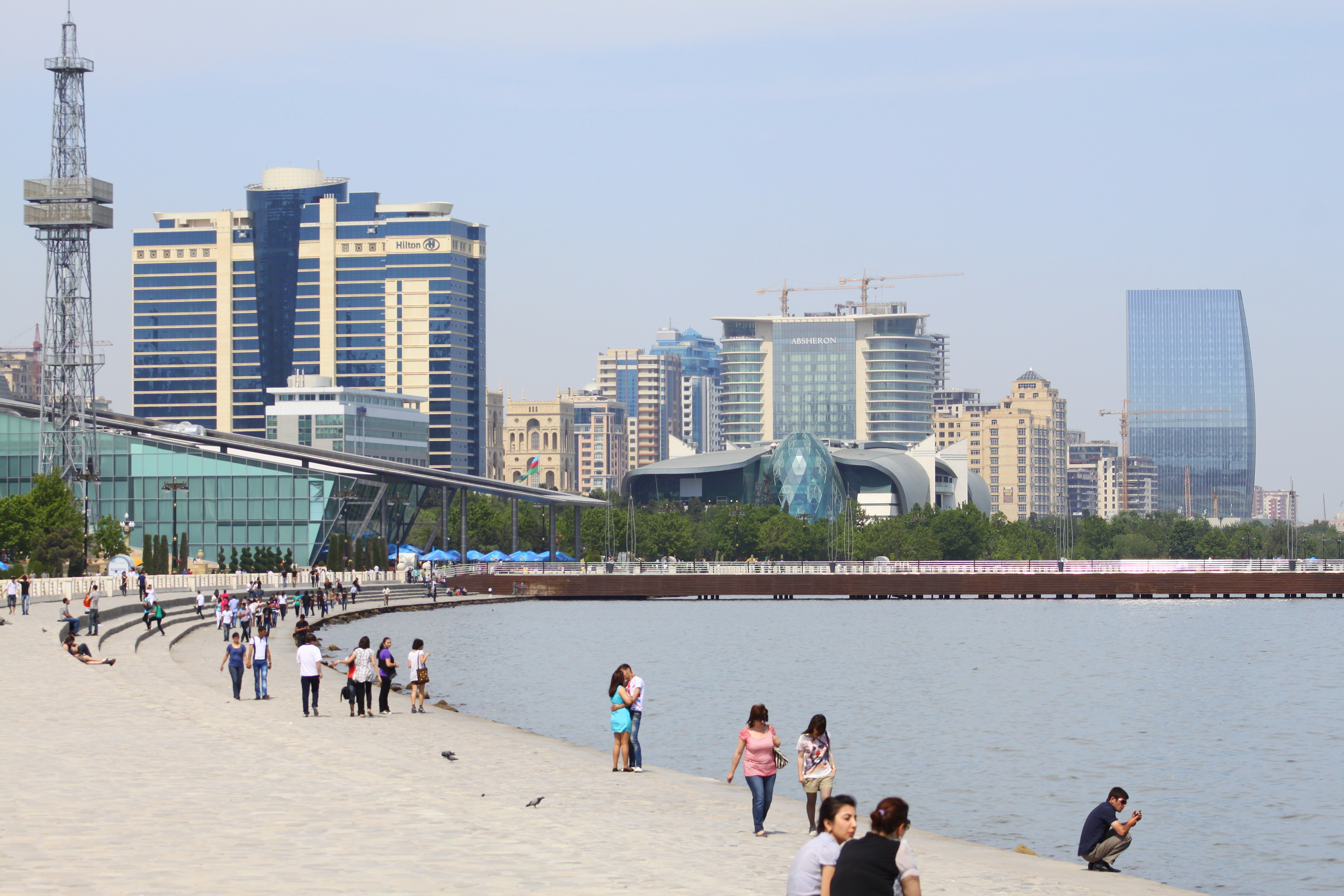
Baku Boulevard

=== Australia and Oceania ===
==== Australia ====
- St Kilda Road, Melbourne
- Royal Parade, Melbourne
- Victoria Parade, Melbourne
- Flemington Road, Melbourne
- Mount Alexander Road, Melbourne
- The Boulevard, Perth

==== New Zealand ====
- The Four Avenues, Christchurch
- Anzac Avenue, Dunedin
- Marine Parade, Napier
Boulevards of Oceania
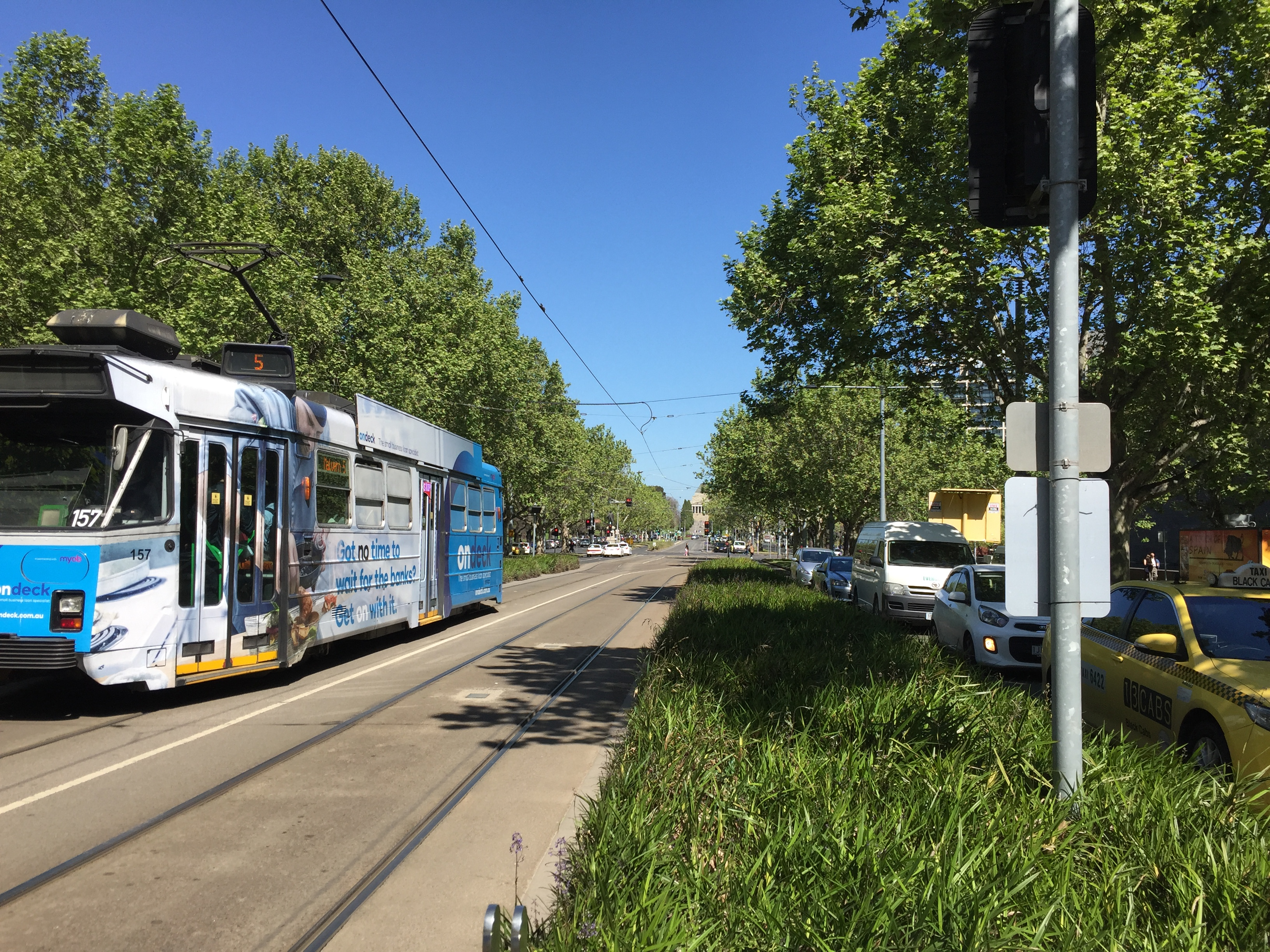
St Kilda Road, Melbourne

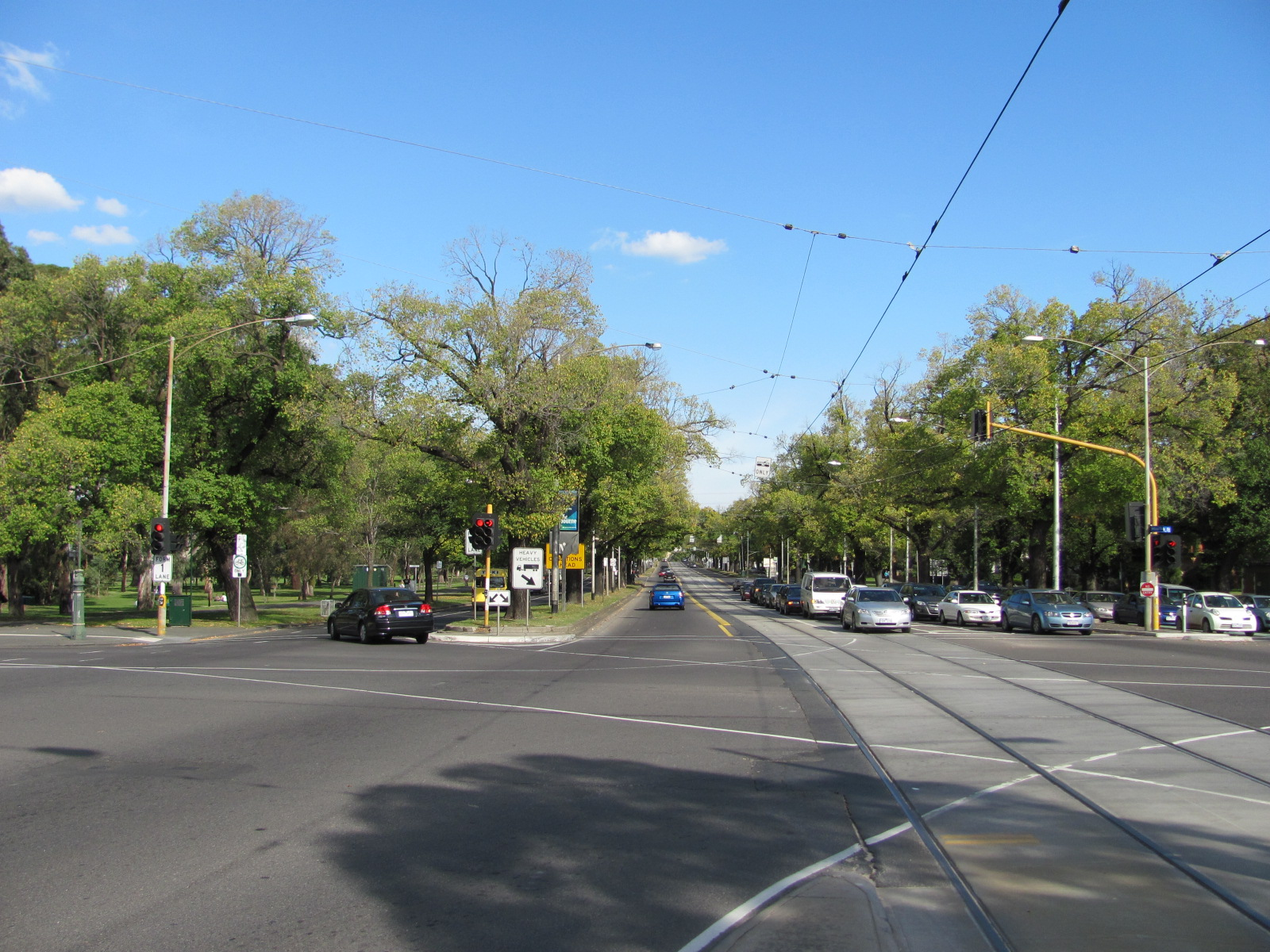
Royal Parade, Melbourne

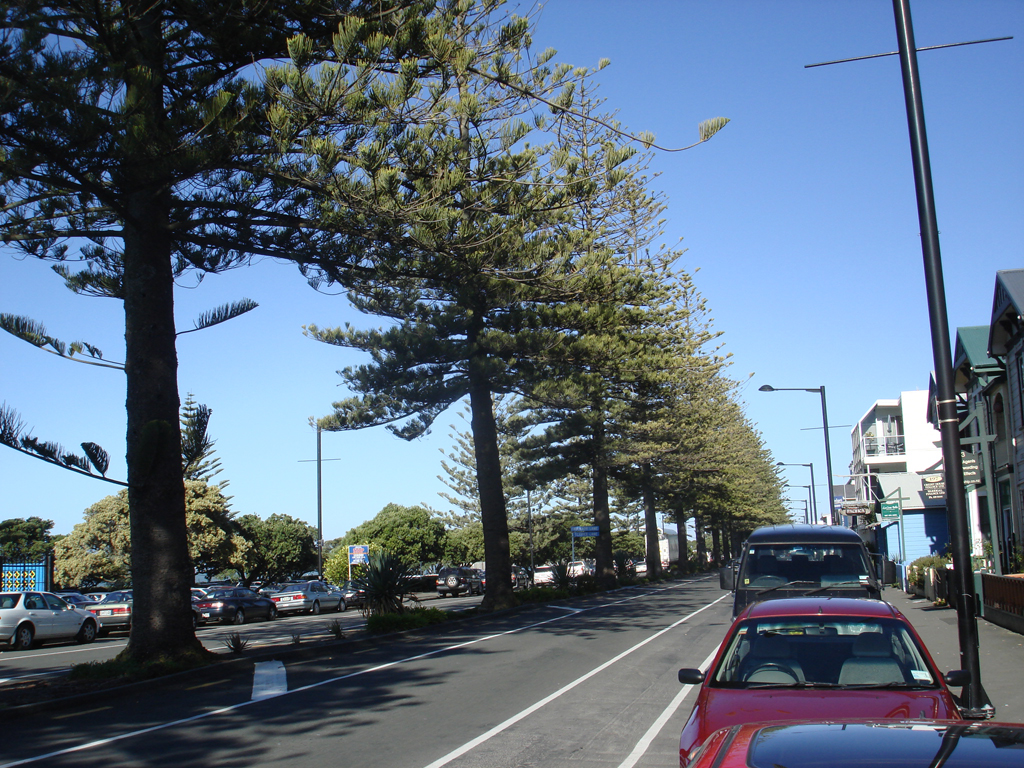
Marine Parade, Napier

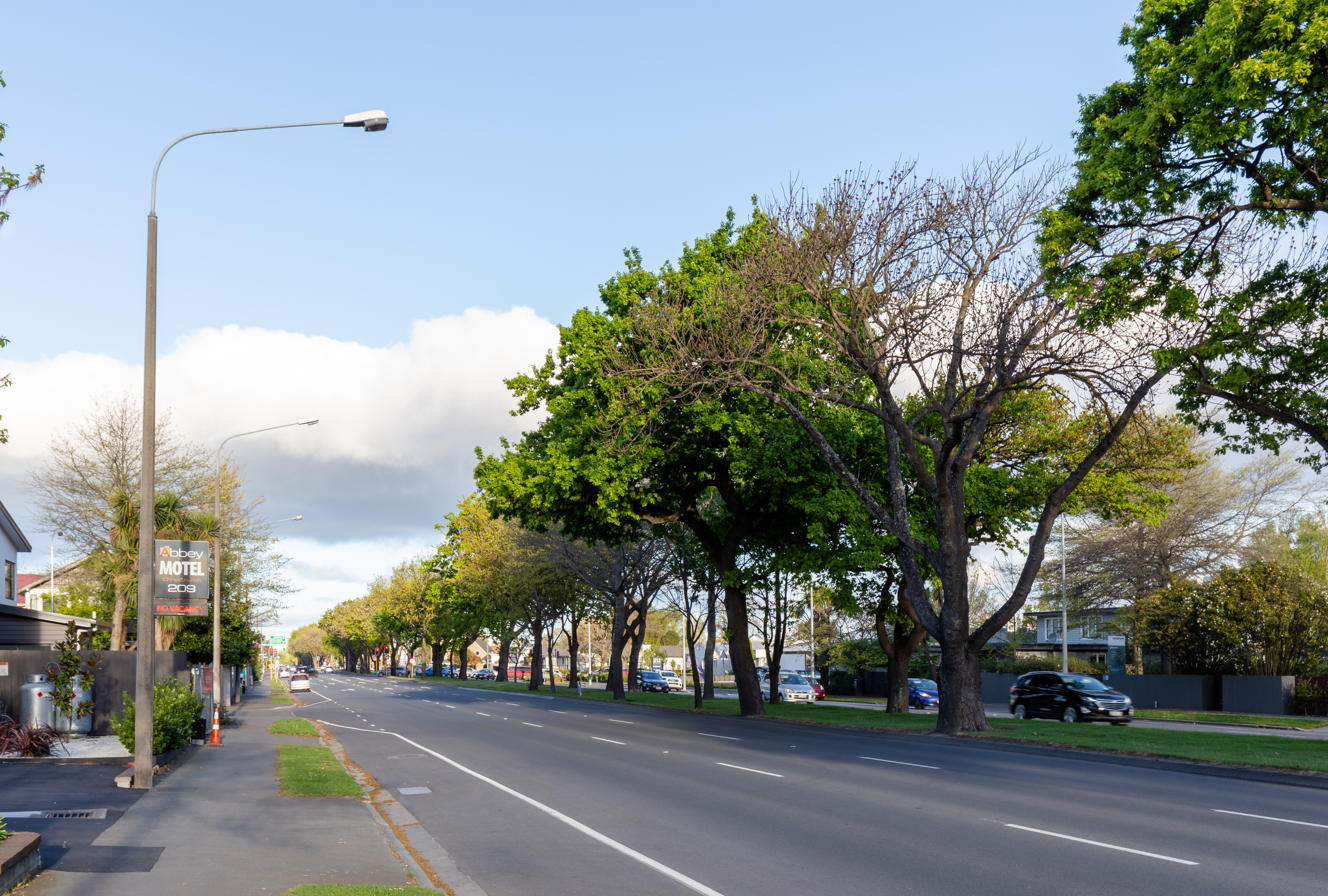
Bealey Avenue, one of Christchurch's Four Avenues

=== Europe ===
==== Austria ====
- Vienna Ring Road

==== Denmark ====
Boulevards in Copenhagen:

- Nørre Voldgade
- H. C. Andersens Boulevard
- Vesterbrogade
- Sønder Boulevard
- Dalgas Boulevard
- Strandboulevarden
- Frederiksberg Allé

==== France ====
- Boulevard Beaumarchais
- Boulevard du Temple
- Boulevard Montmartre
- Boulevard des Italiens
- Boulevard des Capucines
- Boulevard de la Madeleine

==== Germany ====
- Unter den Linden, Berlin
- Kurfürstendamm, Berlin
- Karl-Marx-Allee, Berlin
- Boulevard der Stars, Berlin
- Königsallee, Düsseldorf
- Goerdelerring, Leipzig
- Brienner Straße, Munich
- Leopoldstraße, Munich
- Maximilianstraße, Munich
- Prinzregentenstraße, Munich

==== Hungary ====
- Little Boulevard, Budapest
- Grand Boulevard, Budapest
- Hungária Boulevard, Budapest

==== Ireland ====
- O'Connell Street, Dublin

==== Italy ====
- Viali di Circonvallazione, Florence
- Foro Buonaparte, Milan
- Stradone Martiri della Libertà, Parma
- Via Merulana, Rome

==== Netherlands ====
- Lange Voorhout, The Hague

==== Spain ====
- Gran Via de les Corts Catalanes, Barcelona
- Avenida de la Granvia de Hospitalet, Barcelona
- Avinguda Diagonal, Barcelona
- Alameda Principal, Málaga

Gran Vía de Madrid

==== Portugal ====
- Avenida da Liberdade, Lisbon

==== Russia ====
- Boulevard Ring, Moscow
  - Tverskoy Boulevard
- Garden Ring, Moscow

==== Ukraine ====
- Lesya Ukrainka Boulevard
- Sections of Small Ring Road, Kyiv
Boulevards of Europe
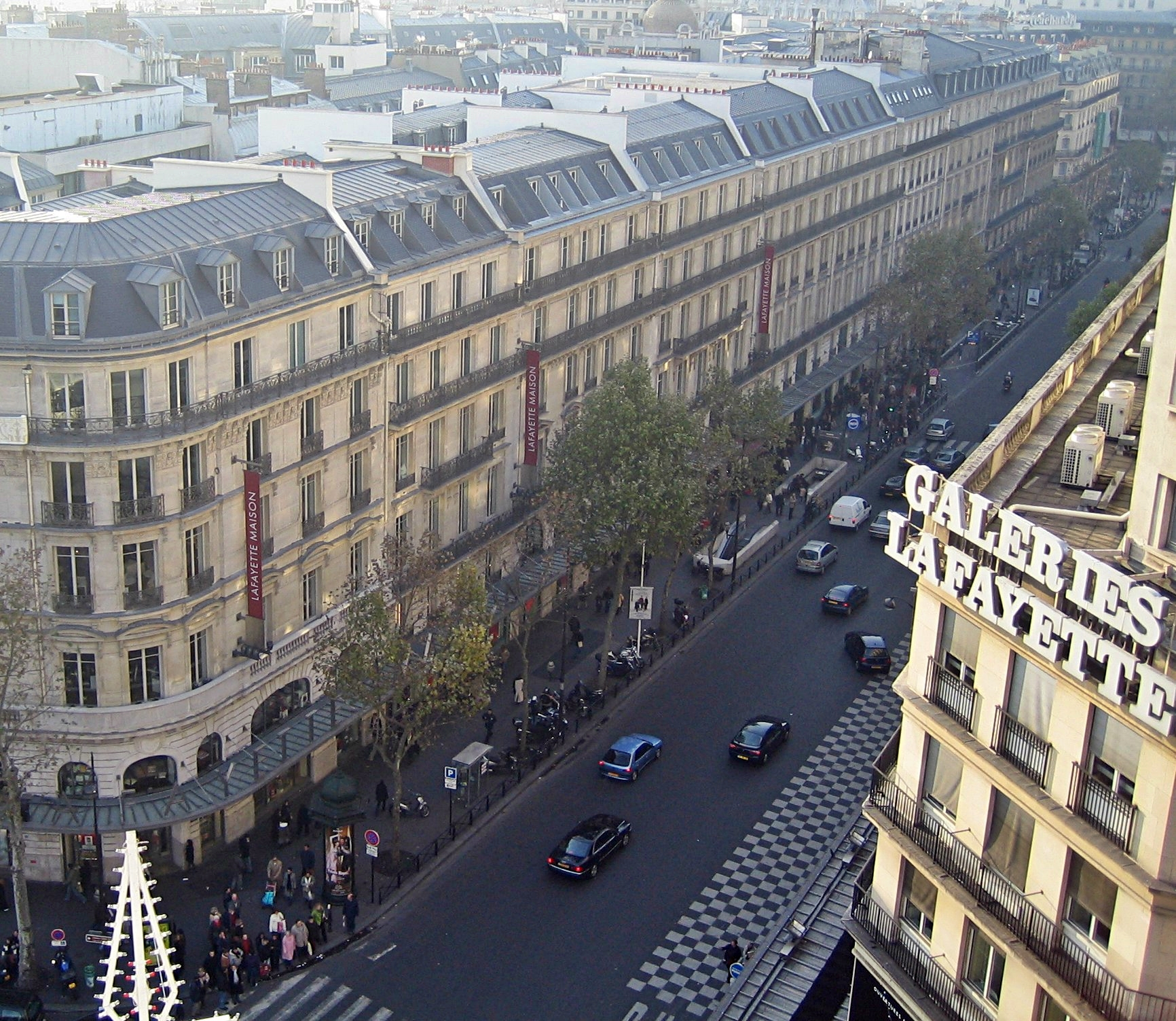
Boulevard Haussmann in Paris

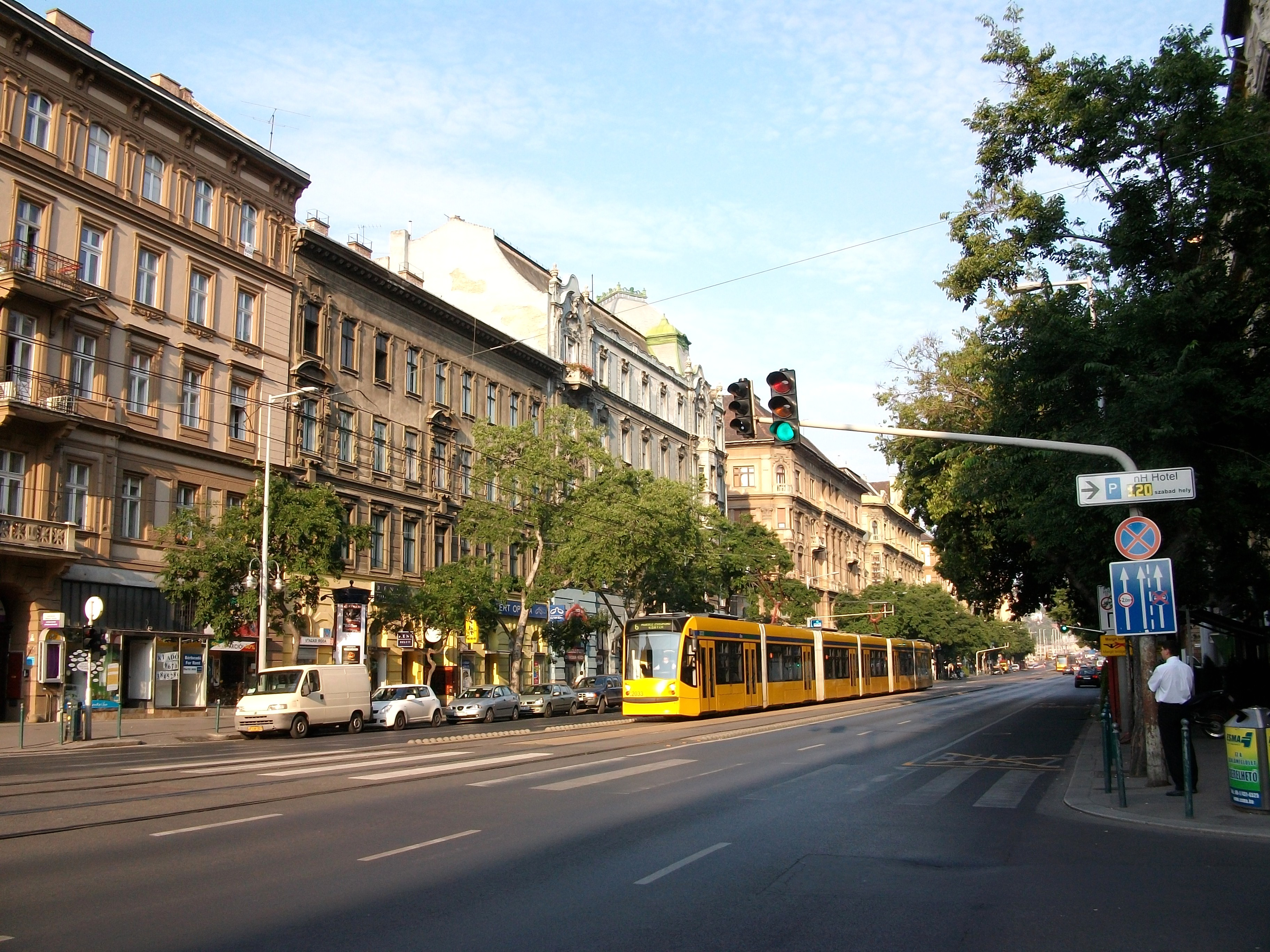
Combino Supra at the Grand Boulevard in Budapest

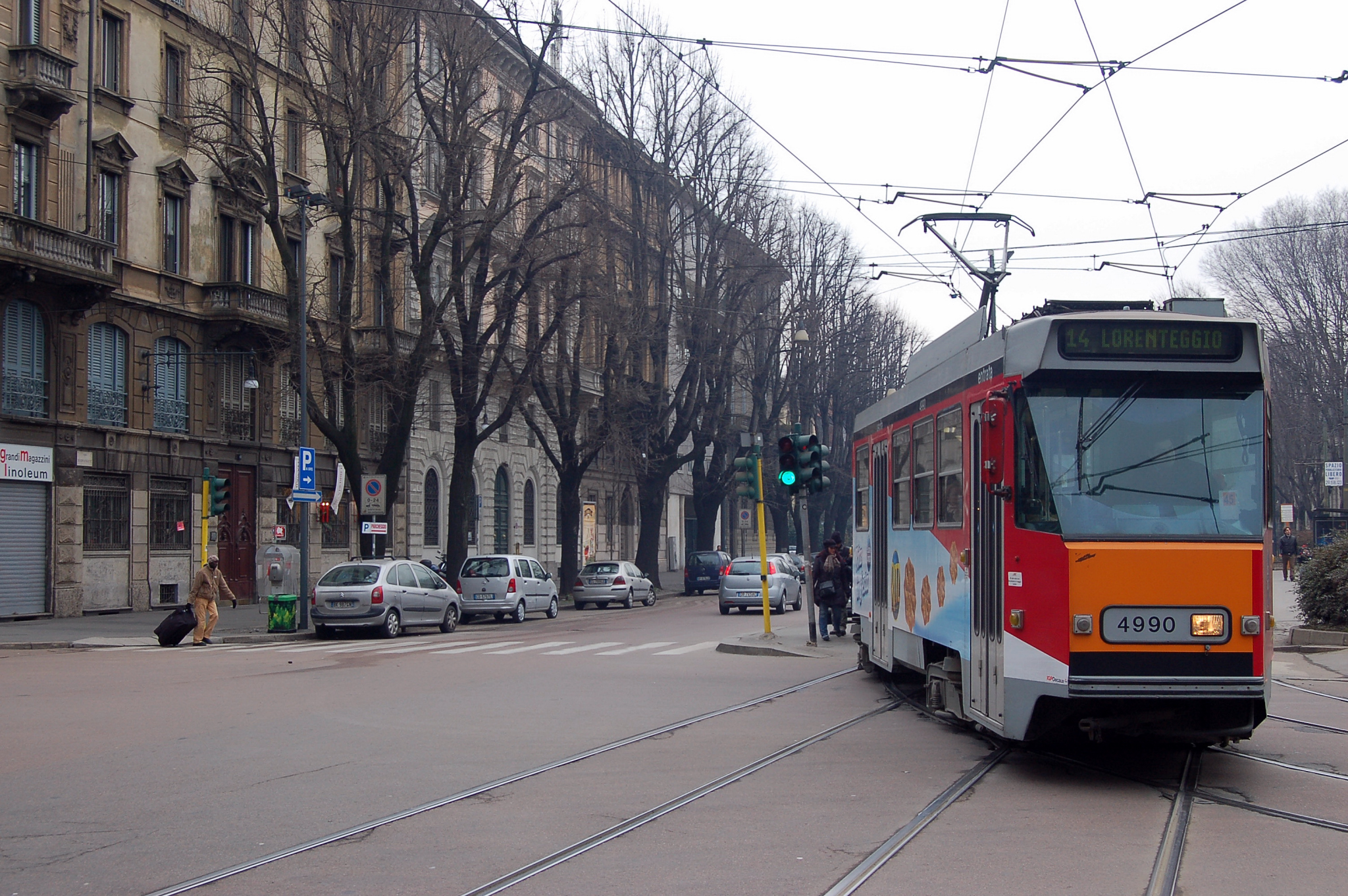
Foro Buonaparte in Milan

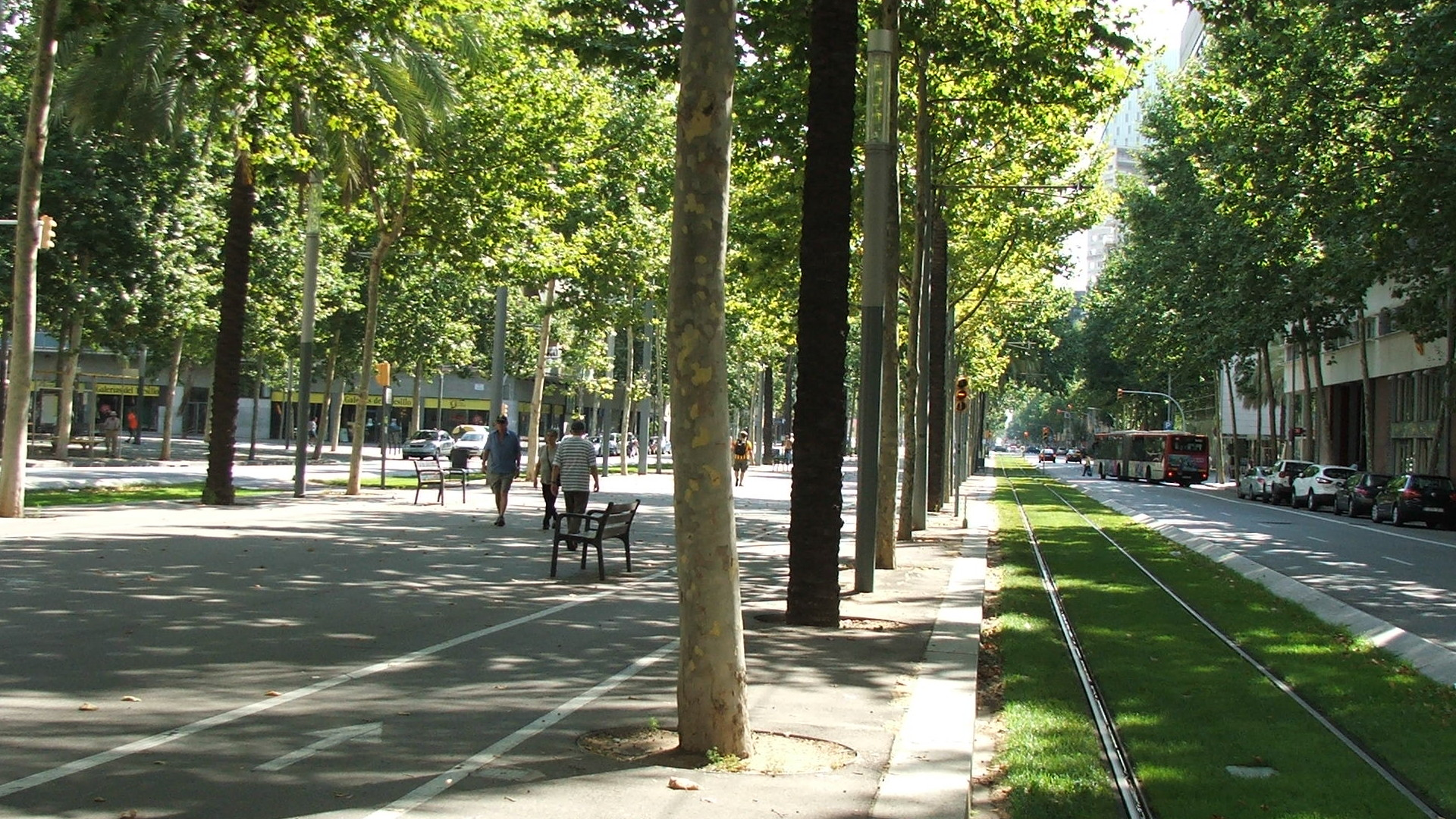
Avinguda Diagonal in Barcelona

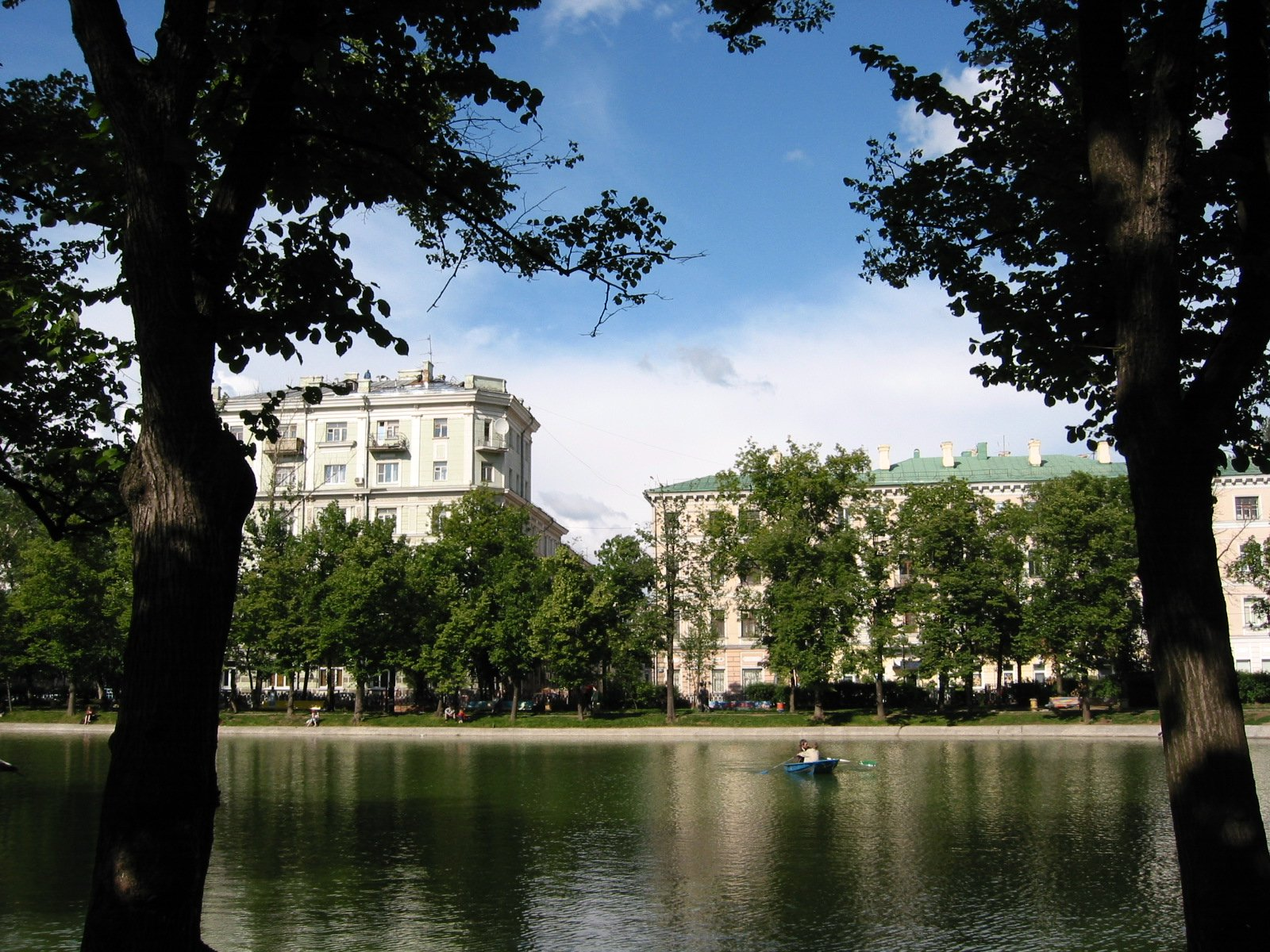
Clean Ponds in the wide median green of Chistoprudny Boulevard in Moscow

==== United Kingdom ====
- Avebury Boulevard, Milton Keynes
- Bradwell Common Boulevard, Milton Keynes
- Conniburrow Boulevard, Milton Keynes
- Midsummer Boulevard, Milton Keynes
- Silbury Boulevard, Milton Keynes

=== North America ===
==== Canada ====
- Lake Shore Boulevard, Toronto
- Pie-IX Boulevard, Montreal
- King George Boulevard, Surrey

==== Mexico ====
- Paseo de la Reforma, Mexico City

==== United States ====
- Ocean Parkway, Brooklyn
- Broadway, Manhattan
- West Side Highway, Manhattan
- FDR Drive, Manhattan (future project)
- Sunset Boulevard, Los Angeles
- Santa Monica Boulevard, Los Angeles
- Wilshire Boulevard, Los Angeles
- Hollywood Boulevard, Los Angeles
- Chicago Boulevard System
- Benjamin Franklin Parkway, Philadelphia
- Roosevelt Boulevard, Philadelphia
- Southern Boulevard Park, Philadelphia
- Boulevard, Atlanta
- Park Avenue, New York City
- Las Vegas Boulevard, Las Vegas
- Ohio River Boulevard, Pittsburgh
Boulevards of North America
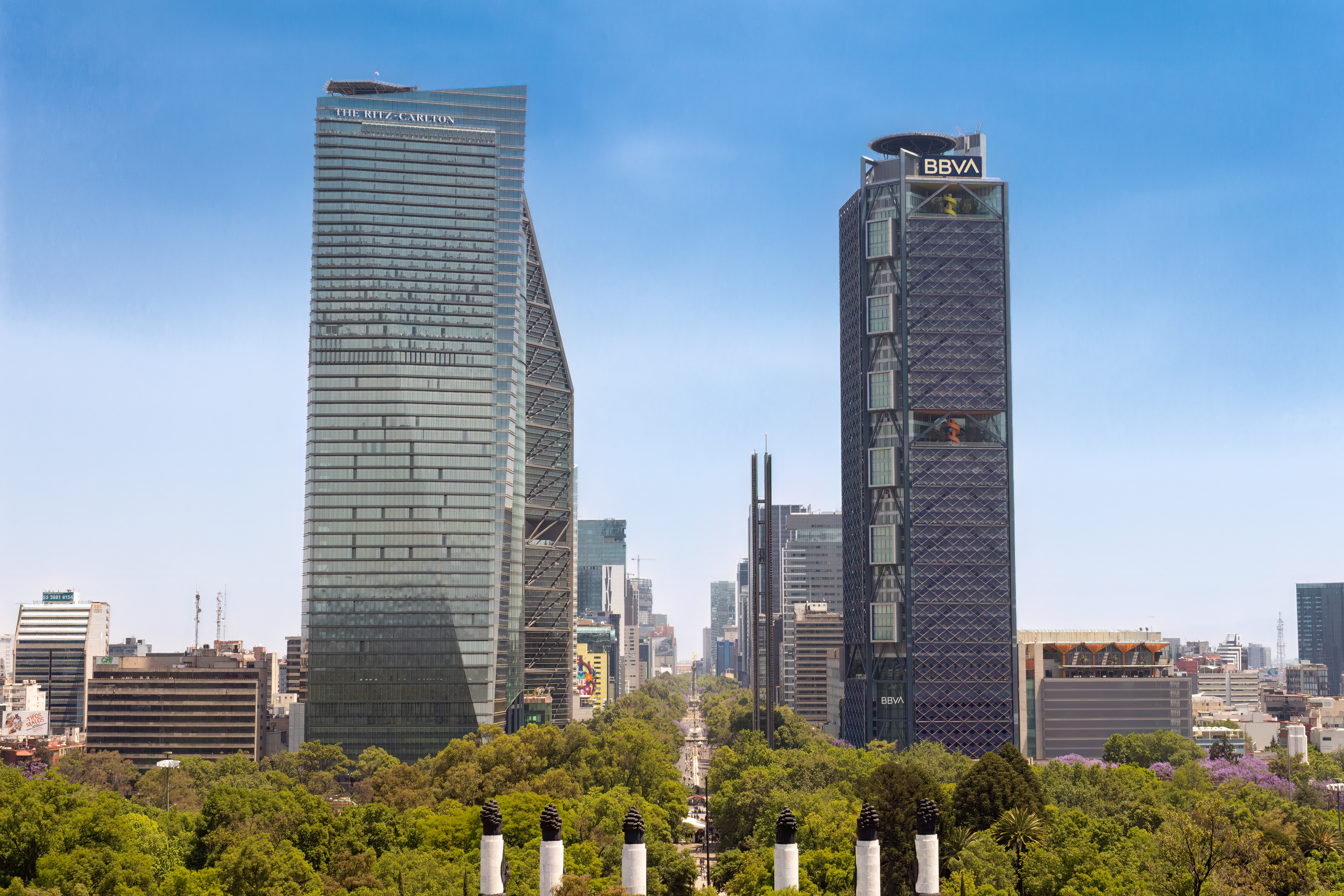
Mexico City's Paseo de la Reforma

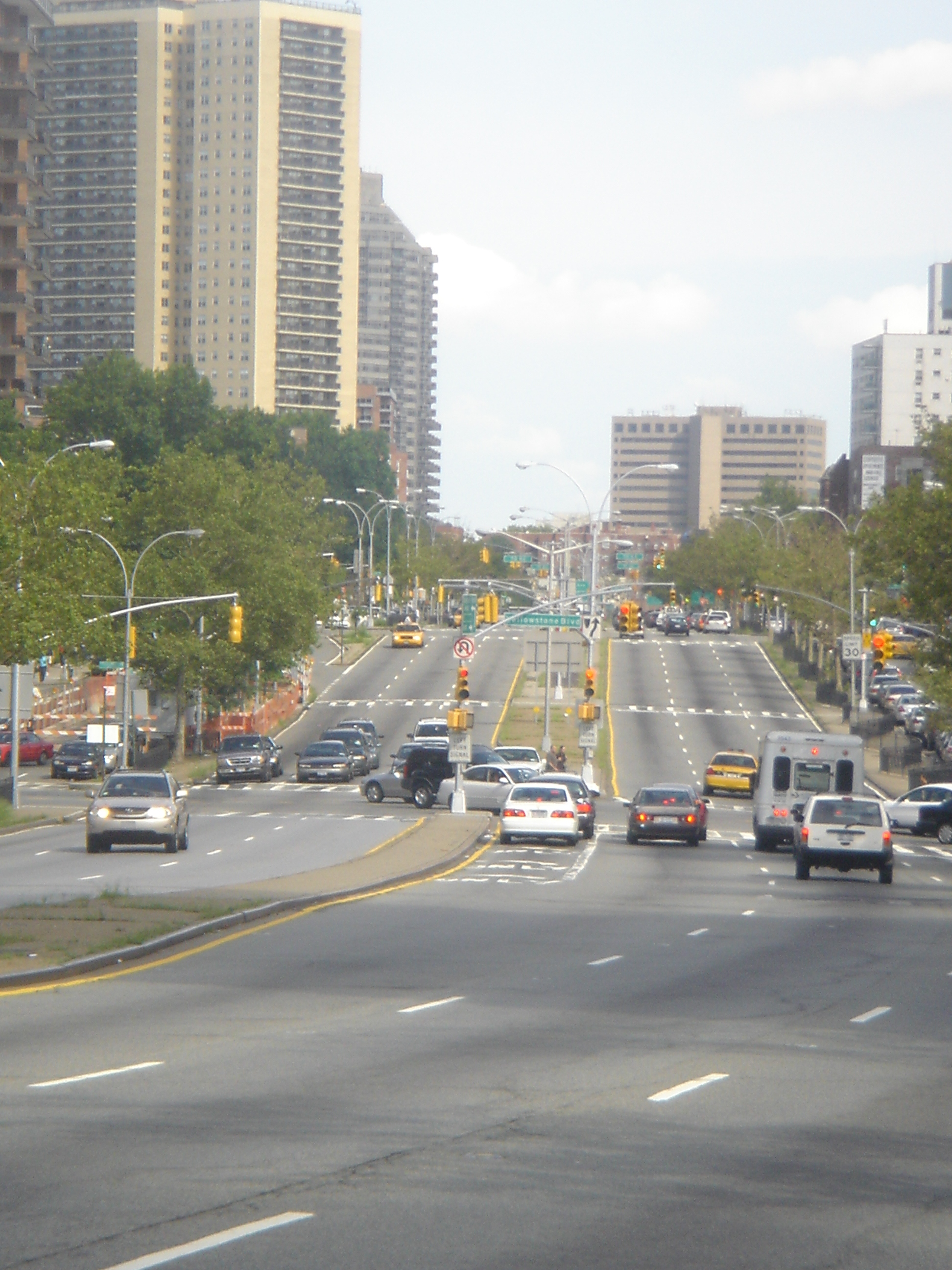
Queens Boulevard in New York City

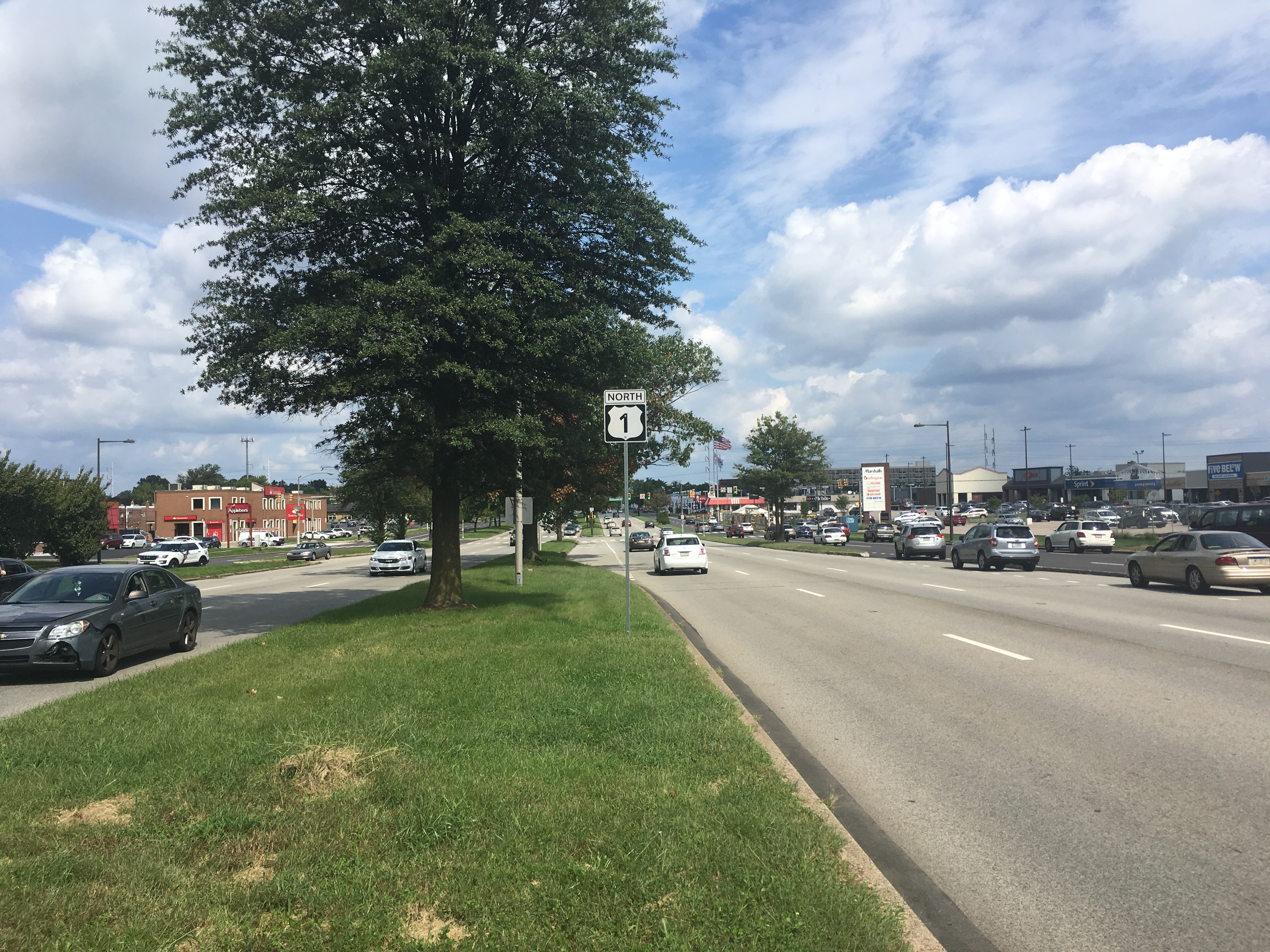
Roosevelt Boulevard in Philadelphia

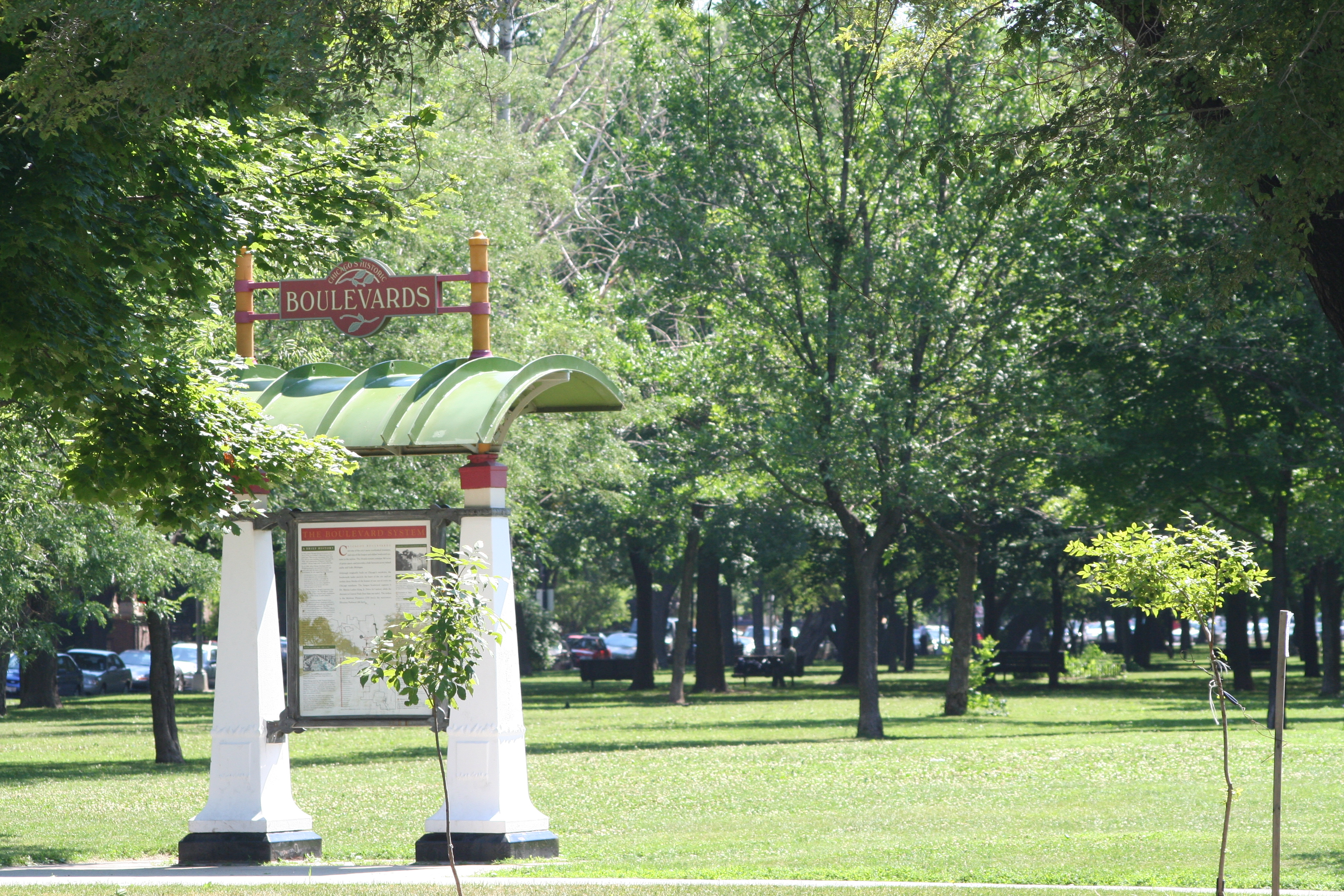
North Kedzie Boulevard (3200W) at West Palmer Square (2200N) in Chicago

=== South America ===
==== Argentina ====
- Avenida 9 de Julio, Buenos Aires

==== Uruguay ====
- Artigas Boulevard, Montevideo

==== Brazil ====
- Avenida Rio Branco, Rio de Janeiro
- Avenida São João, São Paulo

== Books ==
- Jacobs, Allan B.; Elizabeth Macdonald; Yodan Rofé (2003). The Boulevard Book. The MIT Press. ISBN 978-0-262-60023-1.
- Fiaccadori, Gianfranco; Malinverni, Alessandro; Mambriani, Carlo (2012). Guglielmo du Tillot: regista delle arti nell'età dei Lumi (in Italian). Parma: Fondazione Cariparma. ISBN 978-88-7898-064-8. OCLC 889616353.
- Pastega, Agostino Brotto (2010). Antonio Gaidon 1738–1829. Un professionista ante litteram dal rilievo mappale al boulevard. Bassano: Associazione Interprofessionale Bassanese.
