= Theed =

Theed may refer to:

== People with the surname Theed ==
- William Theed the elder (1764–1817), British sculptor, father of:
- William Theed the younger (1804–1891), British sculptor
- William A. C. Theed, owner of the Combe Sydenham estate and High Sheriff of Somerset

== Geographic locations ==
- New Theed, town on the eastern outskirts of Srinagar, India

== Fictional locations ==
- Theed, the capital city of the planet Naboo in the Star Wars series of films
