= Foreshore Road =

Road in Srinagar, Jammu and Kashmir, India

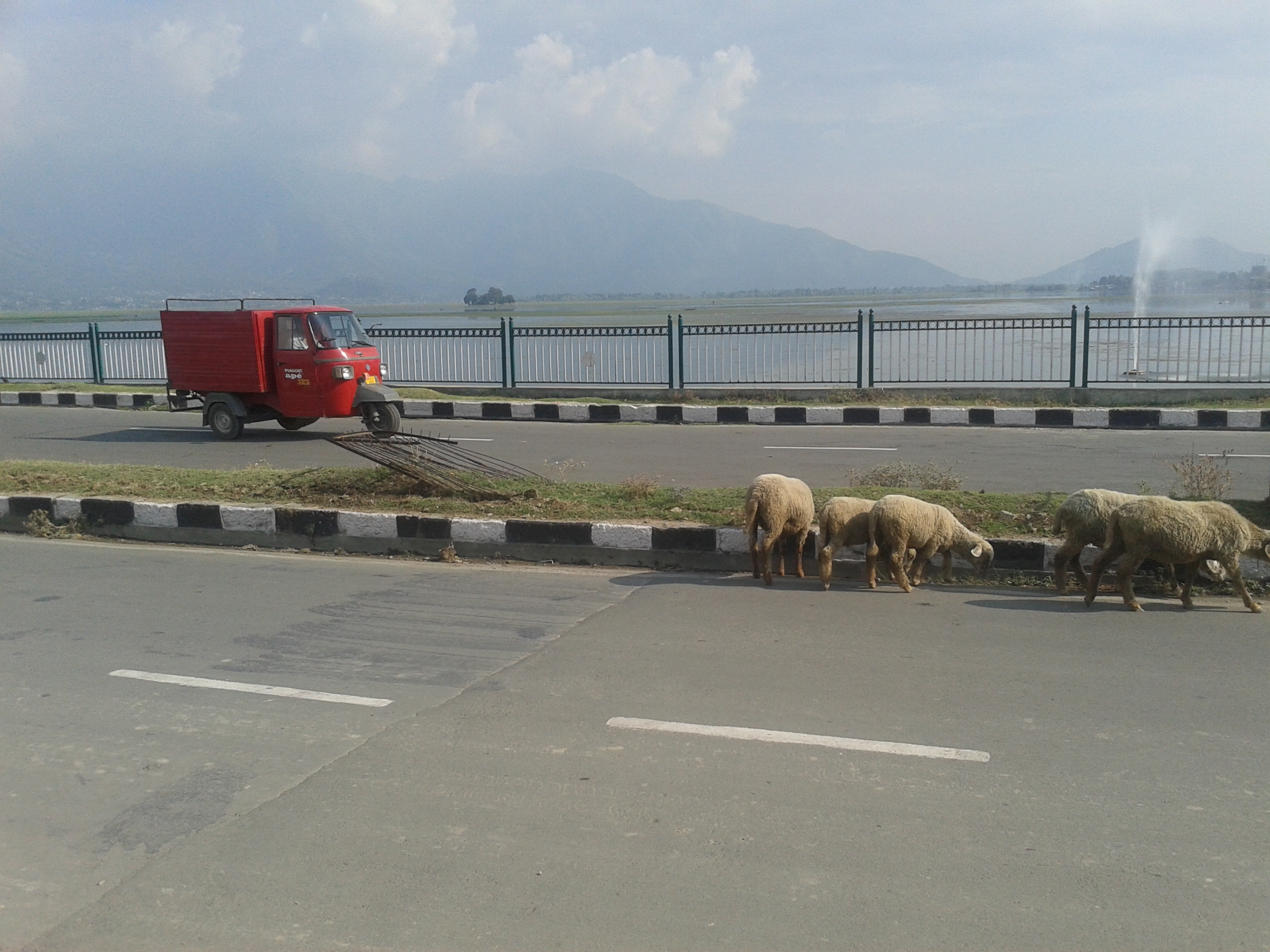

Route information
- Maintained by National Highways Authority of India
- Length: 5.2 km (3.2 mi)

Major junctions
- From: Hazratbal, Srinagar district
- To: Nishat, Srinagar district

Location
- Country: India
- Major cities: Hazratbal, Shalimar, Nishat

Highway system
- Roads in India; Expressways; National; State; Asian

Foreshore Road is one of the prestigious roads in the city of Srinagar. The notability of the road lies in the fact that the entire road lies on the banks of Dal Lake. The road starts from Hazratbal, Srinagar and ends at Nishat. The famous Mughal Gardens of Shalimar Bagh and Nishat Bagh are situated on the road. The economy of the people living here greatly depends on tourism. The road is also connected to the Boulevard road. Driving on the road provides glances of the beautiful Dal Lake and views of the sunset can be enjoyed from this road. In the summers the cool breeze of Dal Lake provides respite to the people resting on the roadside. From 13 April every year, government officials open the Mughal Gardens for visitors around the world. Due to this, tourists can be seen on the way to visit these places. The Foreshore and Boulevard roads also host largest number of hotels for tourists in Srinagar and is maintained by the Government of Jammu and Kashmir regularly.

== Significance ==
The road rests on the northern boundary of the Dal Lake and provides necessary barricade for the possible encroachment in the form of construction.

== Gallery ==
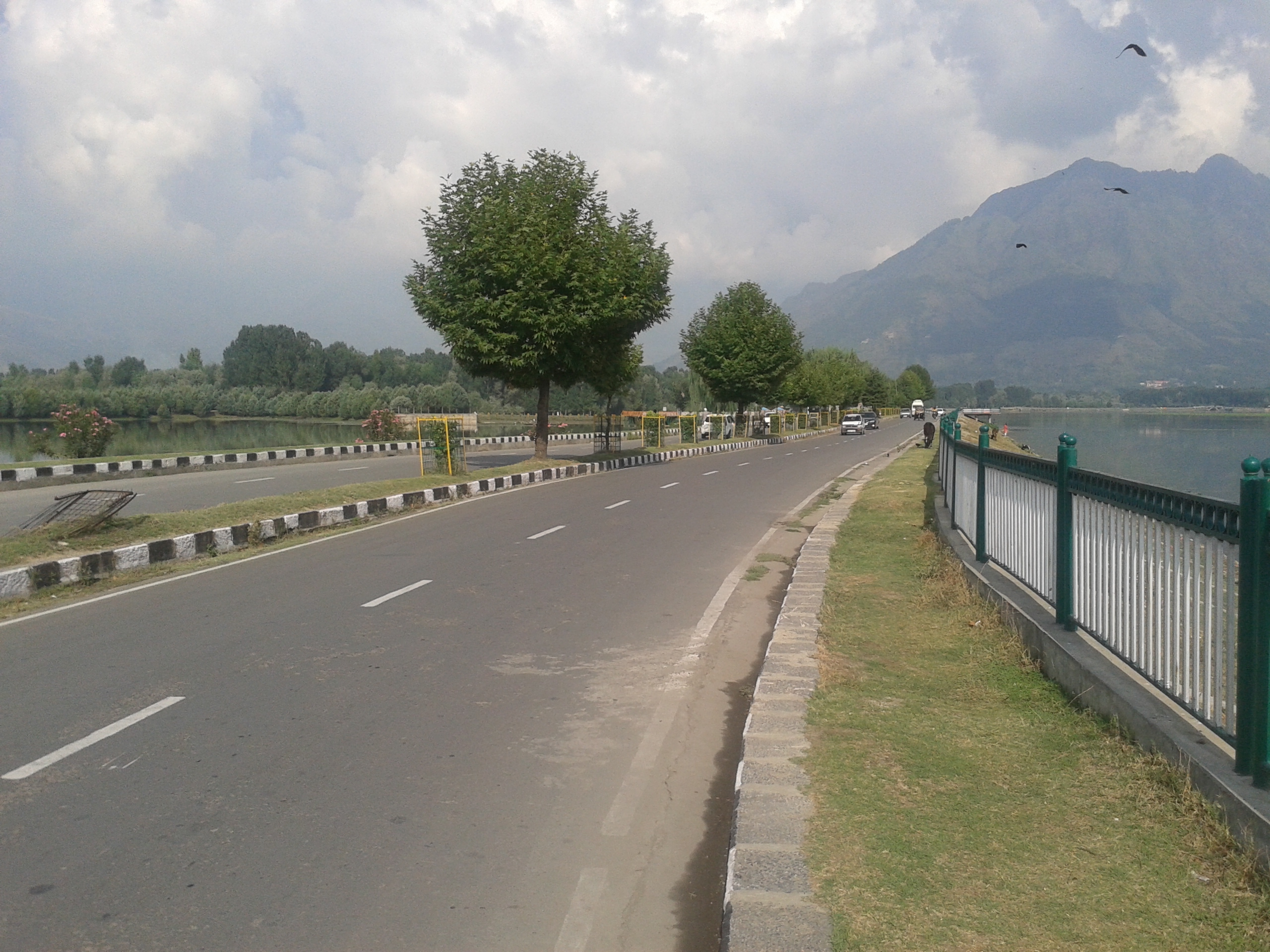
Foreshore Road on the banks of Dal Lake

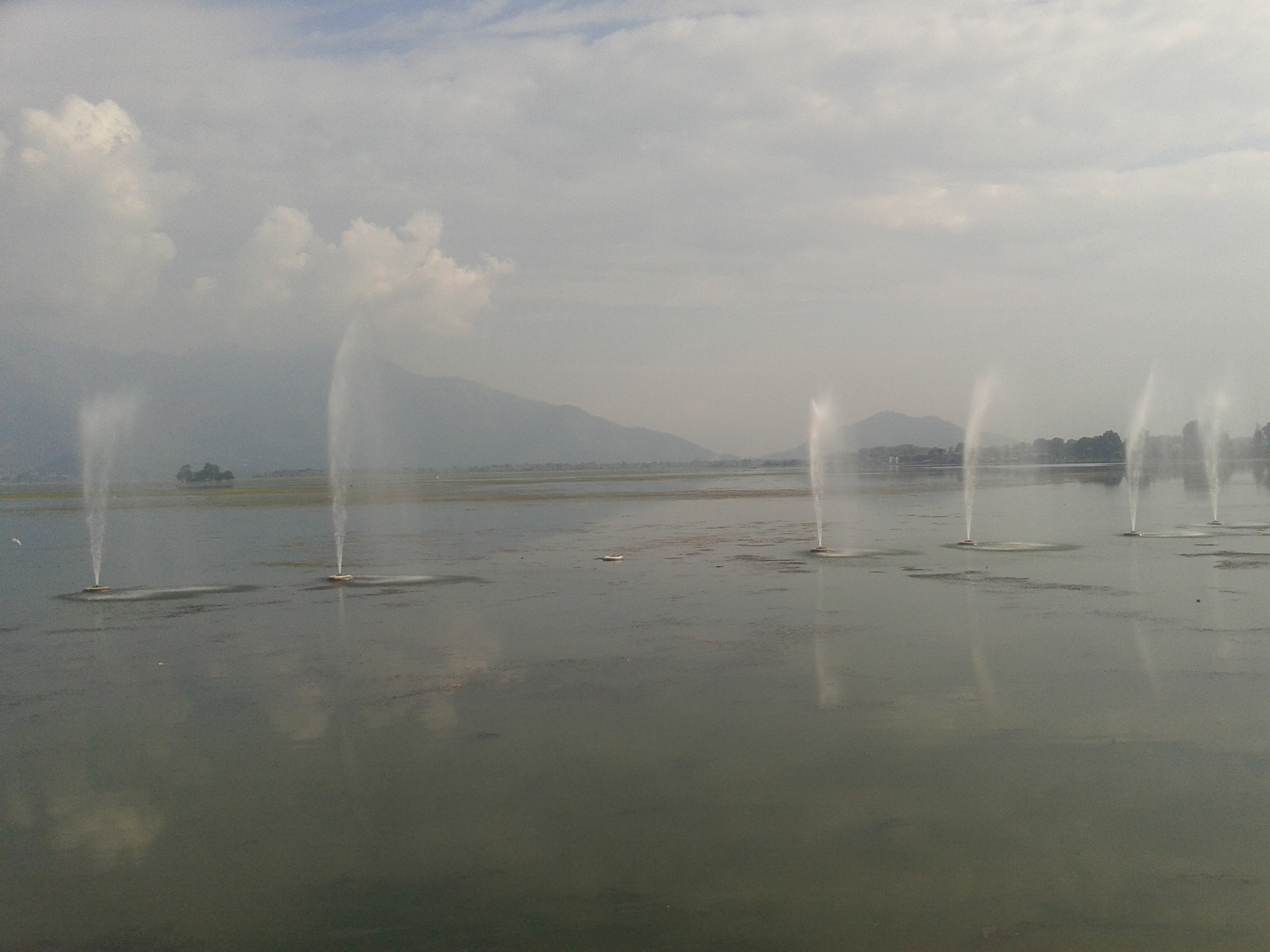
View of the Dal Lake from Foreshore Road

== See also ==
- Hazratbal Shrine
- Kashmir University
- National Institute of Technology, Srinagar
- 90 Feet Road
- Lal Bazar
