= Xi Jinping Boulevard =

Road in Phnom Penh, Cambodia

Xi Jinping Boulevard (Khmer: មហាវិថីស៊ីជីនពីង) is a boulevard in Phnom Penh, the capital of Cambodia.

It was named after General Secretary of the Chinese Communist Party Xi Jinping. It complements the existing Mao Zedong Boulevard.

== Route ==
The road is 53 kilometers long and 22 meters wide. It connects National Highway 1 and National Highway 4 of the Phnom Penh Third Ring Road.

== Construction ==
It was built by China's Shanghai Construction Group. Construction began on January 14, 2019, with a total cost of US$273 million, of which the Cambodian government provided funds and China provided preferential loans. The road is hailed as one of the most expensive infrastructure projects in Cambodia's history.

Asia-Pacific geopolitical observer Seng Vanly told CamboJA News that naming a road "Xi Jinping Avenue" was not unusual, as other roads in Cambodia have been named after international leaders or countries to symbolize the close friendship between the two sides.
