= Salim Ali National Park =

National park in Jammu and Kashmir, India

- IUCN category II (national park)
- Interactive map of Salim Ali National Park
- Location: Srinagar, Jammu and Kashmir, India
- Area: 9.07 km^{2} (3.50 sq mi)
- Established: 1986

Salim Ali National Park or City Forest National Park is a national park located in Srinagar, Jammu and Kashmir, India. It covered an area of 9.07 km^{2}. Notified in 1986, the name of the park commemorated the Indian ornithologist Salim Ali. The park was converted into the Royal Springs Golf Course, Srinagar between 1998 and 2001 by Farooq Abdullah, then Chief Minister of Jammu and Kashmir.

The park features wildlife species such as the hangul, musk deer, Himalayan black bear, leopard, Himalayan serow and 70 species of birds, including the paradise flycatcher, Himalayan monal, and Himalayan snowcock.
