= Nishat =

Place in Jammu and Kashmir, India

- Location in Jammu and Kashmir, India
- Coordinates: 34°9′36″N 74°46′49″E

Government
  - Type: India
  - Body: Government of Jammu and Kashmir
- Elevation: 1,590 m (5,220 ft)

Languages
  - Official: Kashmiri, Urdu, Hindi, Dogri, English
- Time zone: UTC+5:30 (IST)
- Postal Code: 190006
- Vehicle registration: JK

Nishat is a town on the eastern outskirts of Srinagar, the summer capital of the union capital of Jammu and Kashmir, India.

Nishat is famous for the Nishat Gardens (Nishat Bagh). And is a very popular tourist destination. The Nishat Bagh is a 12 terraced garden located near Srinagar's famous Dal Lake. It is the second-largest Mughal garden in Kashmir after Shalimar Bagh. Nishat Bagh was designed and built in 1633 by Asif Khan, the elder brother of Nur Jehan.

The area also hosts the house of Lakshman Joo, a 20-century Kashmiri mystic and philosopher, which has become a local pilgrimage centre.
