= Jawaharlal Nehru Memorial Botanical Garden =

Botanical garden in India

Coordinates: 34.093°N 74.882°E

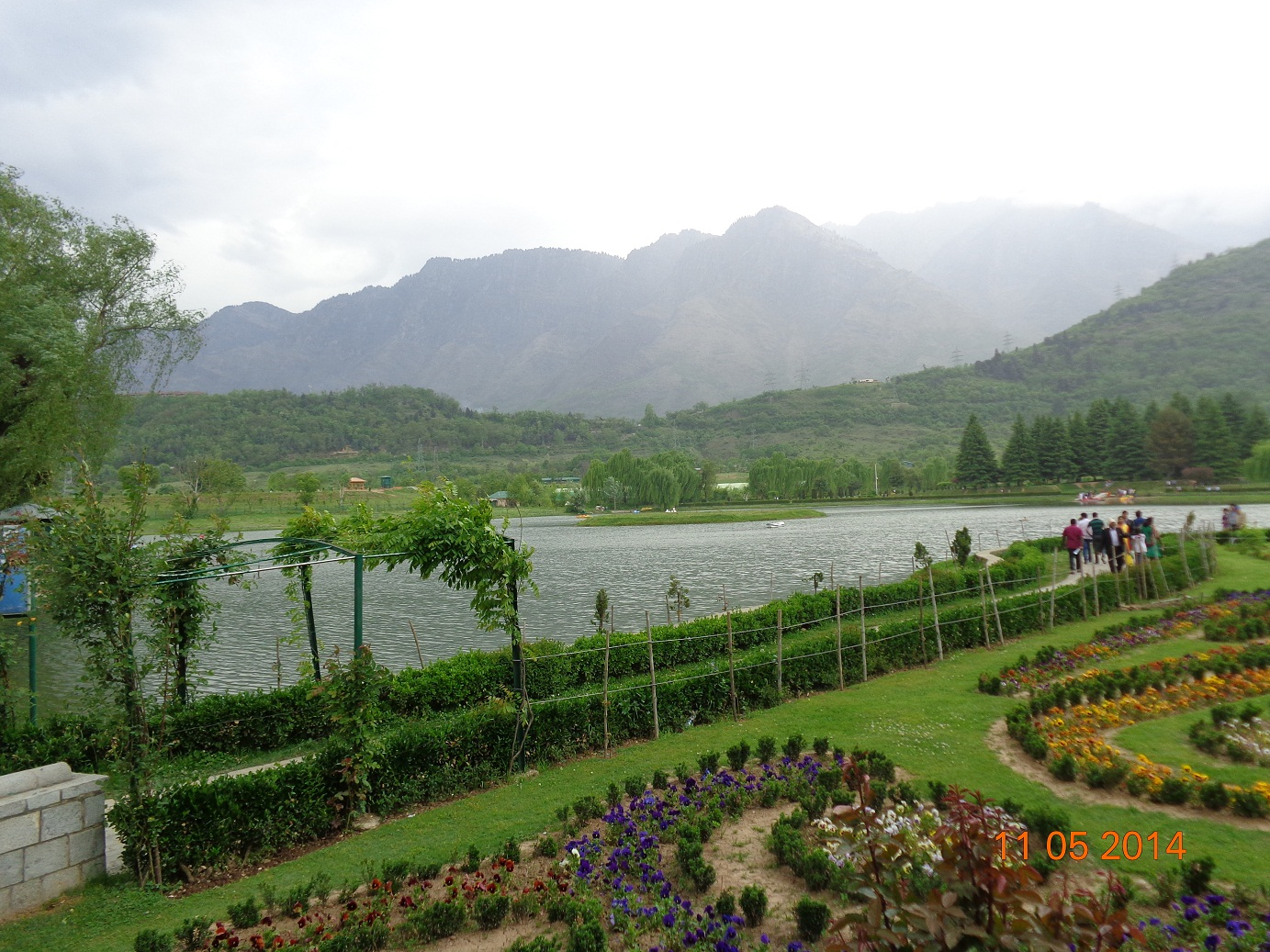
Lake in the botanical garden

The Jawaharlal Nehru Botanical Garden is a botanical garden in Srinagar, Jammu and Kashmir, India, which was set up in 1969 and fully established in 1987. It was created in memory of India's first Prime Minister. It contains many types of plants and vegetation. This garden has a collection of about 150,000 ornamental plants and a huge collection of oak varieties. The lake spreads over 17 hectares.

This garden is located on the side of a mountain and near to Chashma Shahi and Roop Bhavani Temple. Many people from various areas of world visit this place. It has four main divisions: the Plant Introduction Centre, the Research Section, the Recreational Garden and the Botanical Garden.
