= Nishat Bagh =

Terraced Mughal garden near Dal Lake, in Srinagar, Indian-administered Kashmir

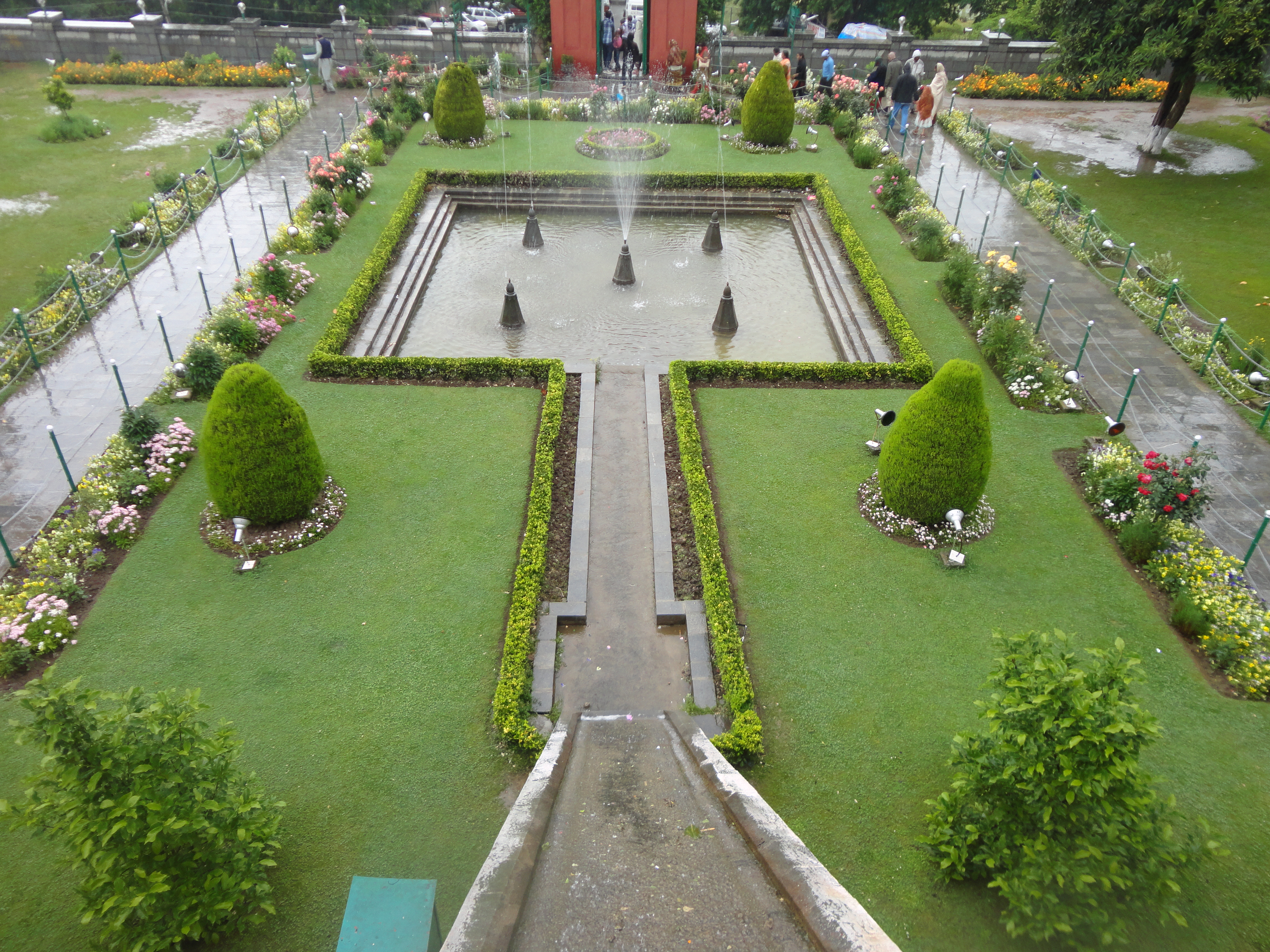
- Nishat Bagh
- Interactive map of Nishat Bagh
- Type: Mughal garden
- Location: Srinagar, Kashmir
- Coordinates: 34°07′30″N 74°52′52″E
- Area: 19 hectares (47 acres)
- Opened: 1633; 393 years ago
- Founder: Asif Khan
- Owner: Jammu and Kashmir Tourism Department
- Operator: Jammu and Kashmir Tourism Department
- Website: https://www.jktdc.co.in/nishat-garden.aspx

Nishat Bagh (lit. 'Garden of Joy' or 'Garden of Delight') is a terraced Mughal garden built on the eastern bank of the Dal Lake, close to Srinagar in the Indian-administered union territory of Jammu and Kashmir in the disputed Kashmir region. It is the second-largest Mughal garden in the Kashmir Valley after Shalimar Bagh.

== History ==
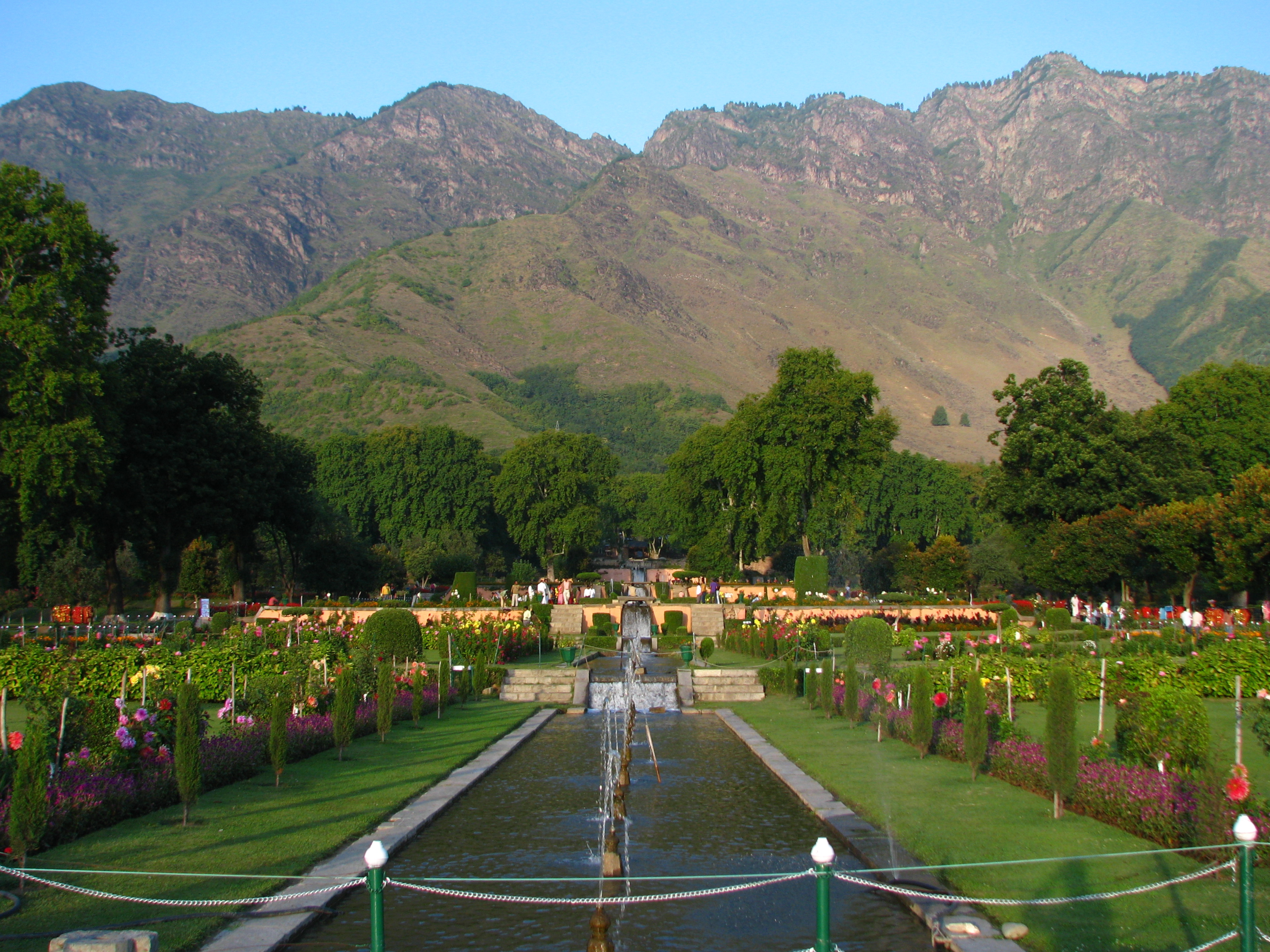
Fountains at Nishat Bagh

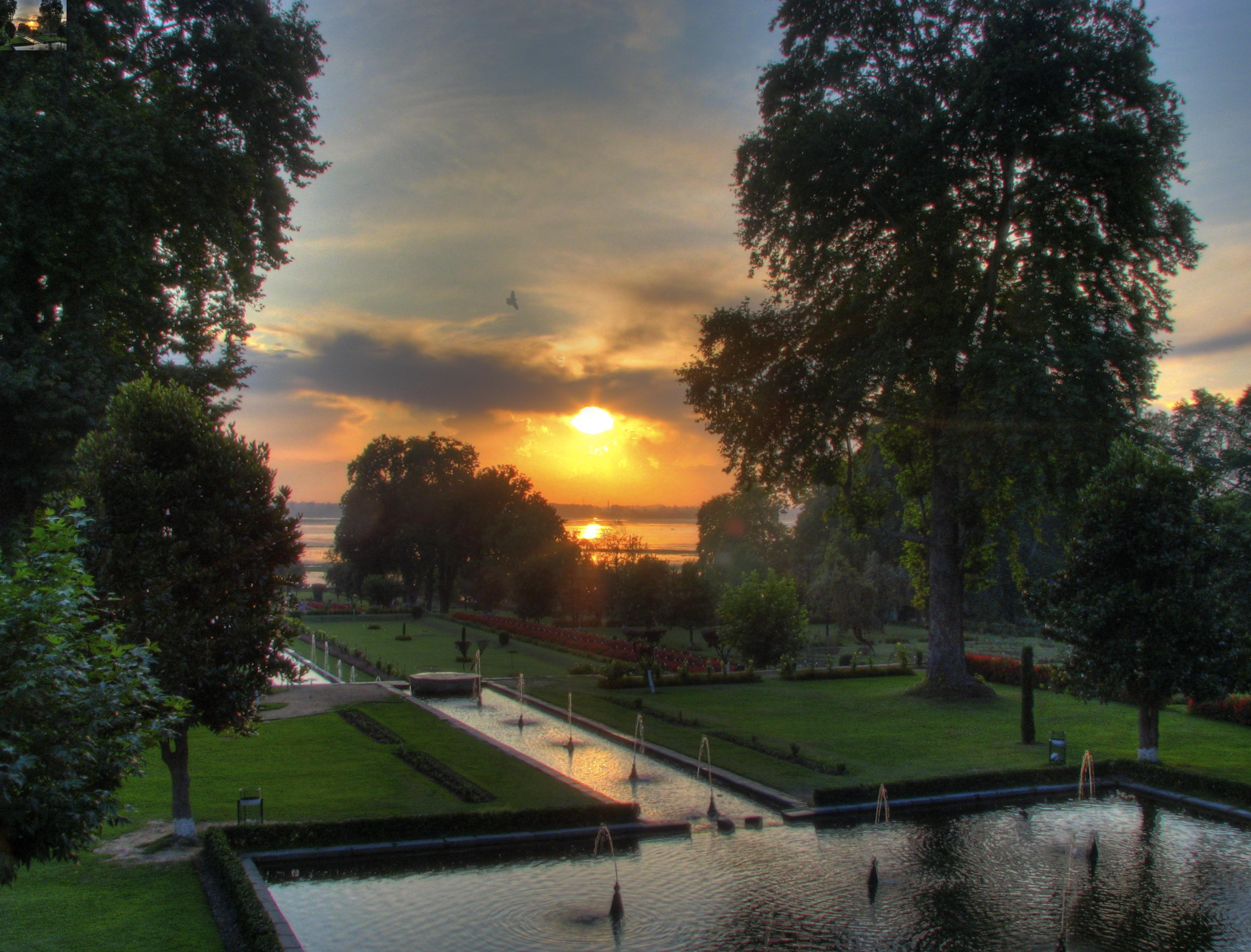
Sunset at Nishat Bagh

The garden is located on the bank of Dal Lake, with the Zabarwan Range as its backdrop, and views of the lake beneath the Pir Panjal Range. The Bagh was designed and built in 1633 by Asif Khan, the elder brother of Nur Jahan. The name 'Nishat Bagh' is derived from Urdu, meaning "Garden of Joy".

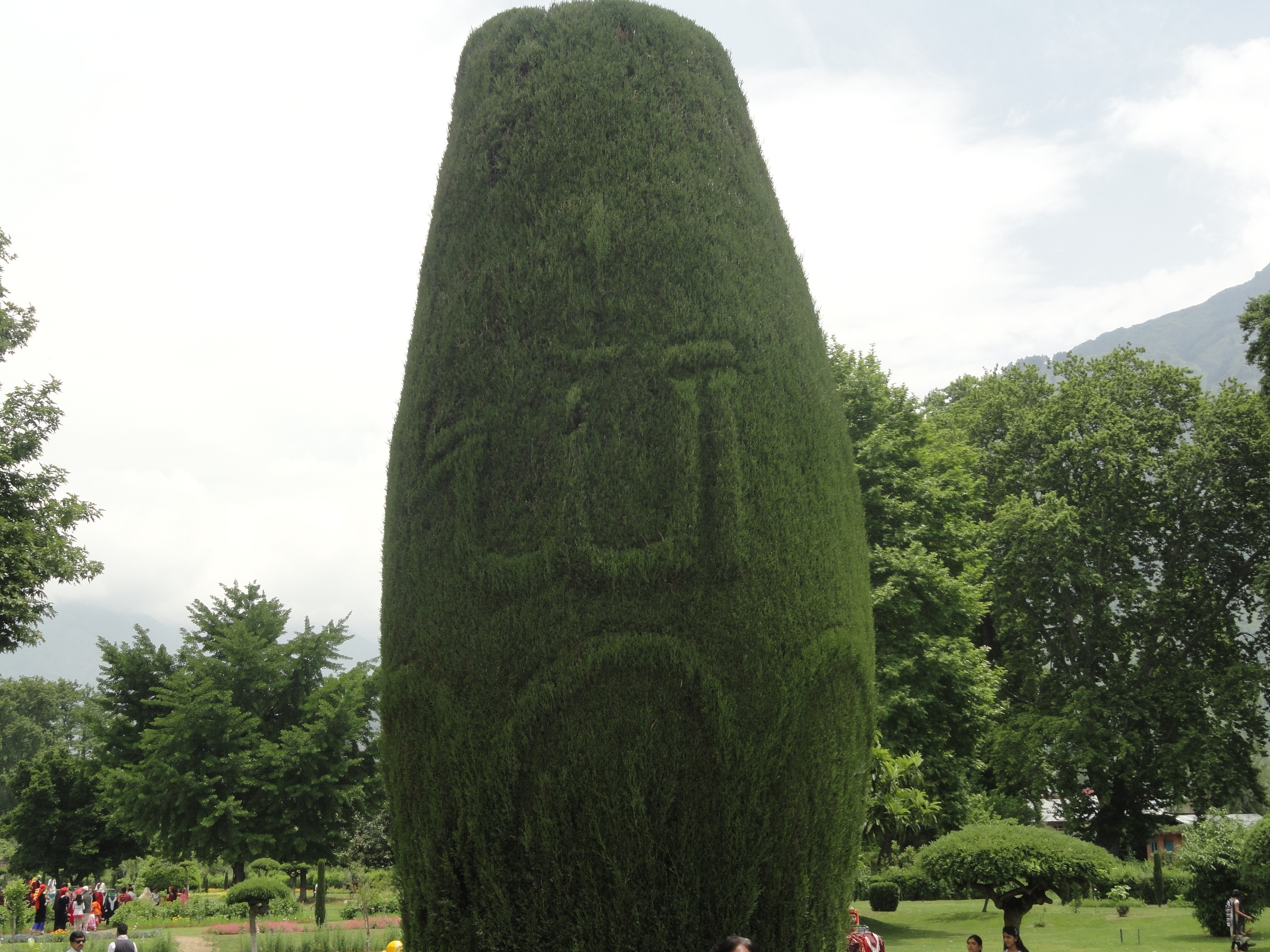
A jhau tree at Nishat Bagh

An anecdote is told of Mughal emperor Shah Jahan being in awe on beholding such a delightful garden. When Shah Jahan saw the garden after its completion in 1633, he expressed great appreciation of its grandeur and beauty. He is reported to have expressed his delight thrice to Asif Khan, his father-in-law, in the hope that Asif Khan would gift the gardens to him. As no such offer was forthcoming from Asif Khan, however, Shah Jahan was piqued and ordered the water supply to the garden to be cut off. The garden was then left deserted for a time. Asif Khan was desolate and heartbroken; he was uninterested in the sequence of events. Once, when he was resting under the shade of a tree, in one of the terraces, one of his servants was bold enough to turn on the water supply to the gardens. When Asif Khan heard the sound of water and the fountains in action, he was startled and immediately ordered the disconnection of the water supply as he feared the worst reaction from the Emperor for this wanton act of disobedience. Fortunately for the servant and for the Khan, Shah Jahan, who had heard about this incident in the garden, was not disturbed or annoyed by the disobedience of his orders. Instead, he approved of the servant's loyal service to his master and then ordered the full restoration of rights for the supply of water to the garden to Asif Khan.

The Mughal Princess Zuhra Begum, daughter of Mughal emperor Alamgir II and granddaughter of emperor Jahandar Shah, is buried in the garden.

== Layout ==
The layout of Nishat Bagh was based on the conceptual model of the Persian gardens, remodelled to fit the topographic and water source conditions at the site chosen in the Kashmir Valley. The plan, instead of being central with four radiating arms in a square pattern as in the case of Chahar (suited for a flat countryside), was changed to an axial stream flow design to fit the hill condition with water source originating at the top of the hill end. This resulted in planning a rectangular layout rather than a square layout. This helped in dispensing with the long side arms. Thus, a rectangular layout with an east–west length of 548 metres (1,798 ft) and a width of 338 metres (1,109 ft) was adopted.

== Architecture ==
Nishat Bagh has a broad cascade of terraces lined with avenues of chinar and cypress trees, which starts from the lakeshore and reaches up to an artificial façade at the hill's end. Rising from the edge of the Dal Lake, it has twelve 12 terraces representing twelve zodiacal signs. However, it has only two sections, namely the public garden and the private garden for the Zanana or harem vis-à-vis the four sections of the Shalimar Bagh; this difference is attributed to the fact that the latter Bagh catered to the Mughal Emperor, while Nishad Bagh belonged to a man of his court, a noble. There are, however, some similarities with the Shalimar Bagh, such as the polished stone channel and terraces. The source of water supply to the two gardens is the same. Built in an east–west direction, the top terrace has the Zenana garden, while the lowest terrace is connected to the Dal Lake. In recent years, the lowest terrace has merged with the approach road. A spring called the Gopi Thirst provides a clear water supply to the gardens. There are a few old Mughal period buildings in the vicinity of the Bagh.

The central canal, which runs through the garden from the top end, is 4 metres (13 ft) wide and has a water depth of 20 centimetres (7.9 in). Water flows down in a cascade from the top to the first terrace at the road level, which could also be approached from the Dal Lake through a shikara ride. The water flow from one terrace to the next is overstepped a stone ramps that provide the sparkle to the flow. At all the terraces, fountains with pools are provided, along the water channel. At channel crossings, benches are provided.

== The terraces ==
The details of the twelve terraces have been recorded as originally built:

- The first terrace is a water collection chamber that is also linked to the side flow from the garden.
- The second terrace is accessed through a gate. This terrace has five fountains that are supplied water from the third terrace, from where it flows to the lowest terrace.
- The third terrace has a different design. The water chute has five arched open niches in the front and similar niches on the sides. A pavilion (baradari), a two-storied structure, which existed here when it was originally built, has since been dismantled. Stairways, on either side of the channel, lead to the third terrace, which has a square chamber with five fountains. Moving up the flight of steps (four steps) on either side of the channel leads to the fourth terrace.
- The fourth terrace has two levels, namely, a water channel and a square pool. Stairways with 7 steps lead to the fifth terrace.
- The fifth terrace, where a stone bench is provided to take in the view across the channel. This also has a square chamber with five fountains.
- The sixth terrace is at two levels with five fountains and a distinctive paving pattern.
- The seventh terrace, where the same pattern continues.
- The eighth terrace is only a water channel or chute.
- The ninth terrace, at the end of two stairways, there is an octagonal bench. The pool in this terrace has nine fountains.
- The stairways to the tenth terrace are along the side retaining walls, where only the water chute with fountains is provided.
- Engraved paths lead to an impressive eleventh terrace, which has twenty-five fountains in a pool. Up from this dramatic terrace is the last one.
- The Zenana chamber, the twelfth terrace, is covered in the front by 5.5 metres (18 ft) high wall with a façade of blind arches. Only one arch in this blind facade provides an opening to the twelfth terrace. Two small octagonal towers on either side of the retaining walls provide views of the lower-level terraces. A two-storey pavilion here is surrounded by a lovely garden with lush plantings.

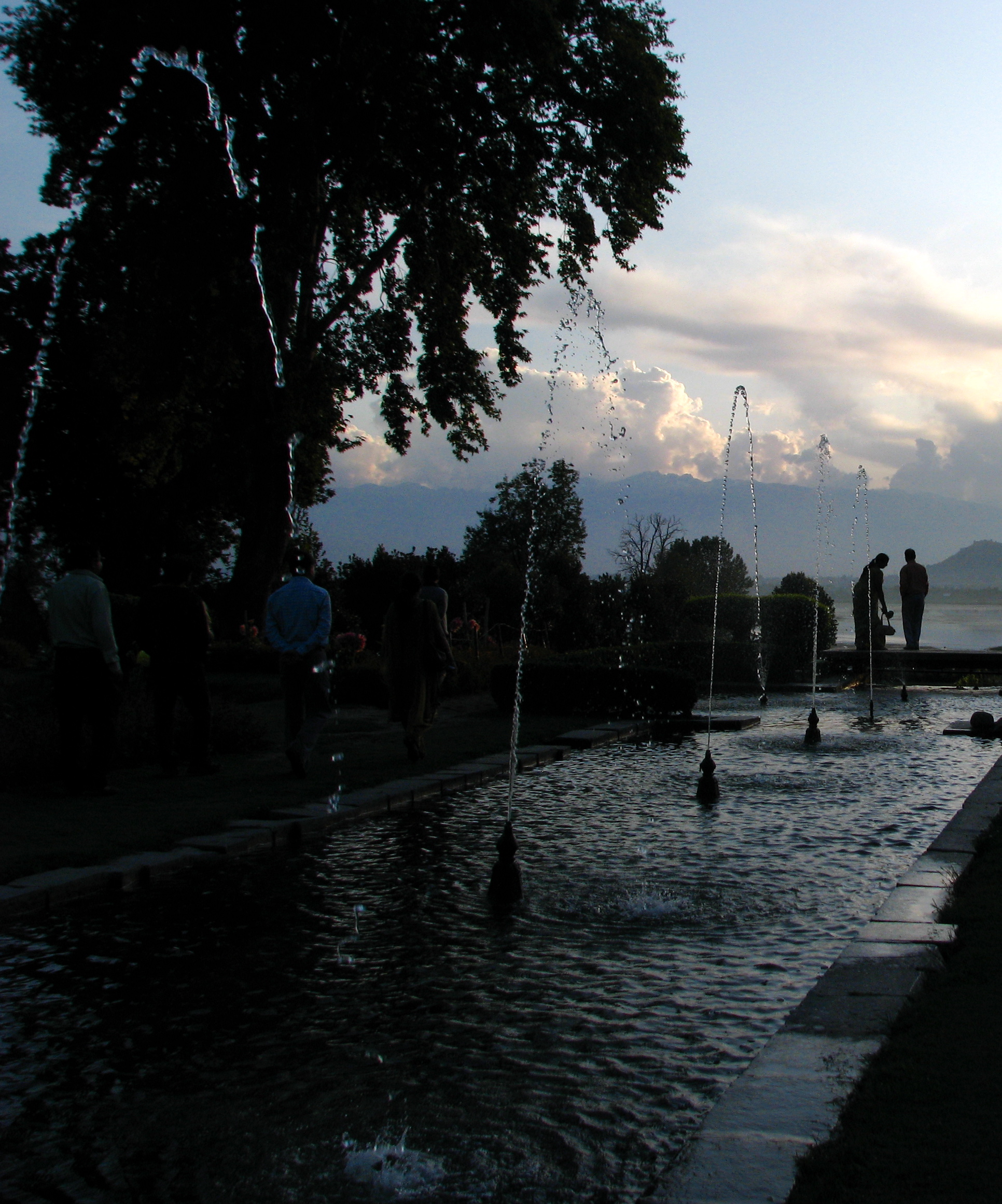
Fountains on terraces in Nishat Bagh

Out of all the terraces, the second terrace is considered the most impressive because of the twenty-three niches provided in the arched recess just behind the cascade. Originally, lighted lamps used to be placed at these niches. The second terrace also has an abundance of Persian lilacs and pansies, coupled with sparkling cascading water over the chute, which provided a lovely sight. Another interesting feature in the Nishat Bagh is the many stones and marble thrones that are placed at the head of almost every waterfall.

== See also ==
- Foreshore Road
- Indo-Islamic Architecture
- Hazratbal
