= Chashme Shahi =

Mughal garden

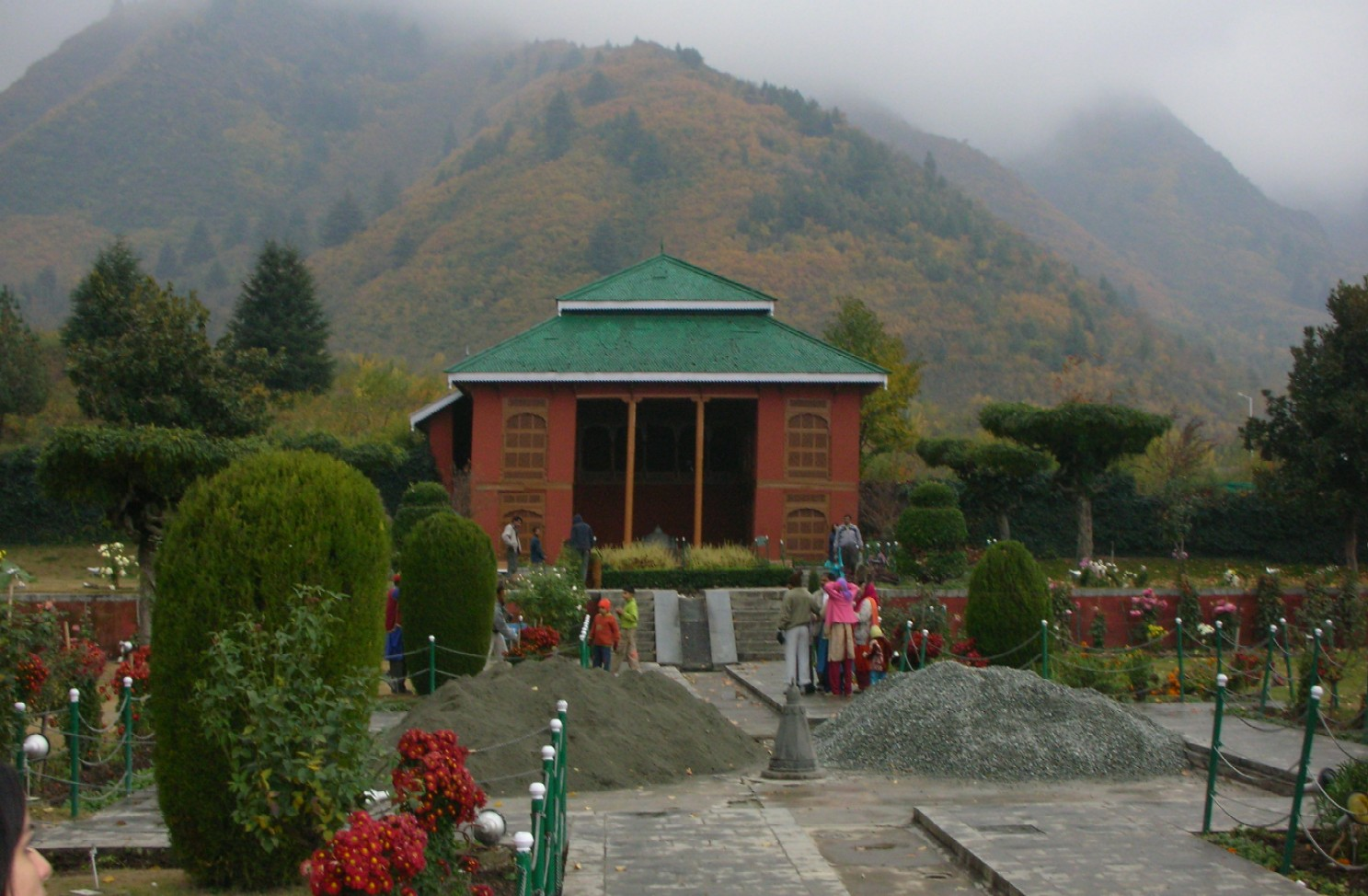
- The Royal Spring
- Interactive map of Chashme Shahi
- Type: Mughal garden
- Location: Srinagar, Kashmir, India
- Coordinates: 34°5′10.14″N 74°53′13.79″E
- Area: 1 acre (0.40 ha)
- Opened: 1632; 394 years ago
- Founder: Shah Jahan
- Owner: Jammu and Kashmir Tourism Department
- Operator: Jammu and Kashmir Tourism Department
- Visitors: 100,000
- Status: Open March–November
- Website: www.jktourism.org

Chashme Shahi, Chashma i Shahi, or Cheshma Shahi (translation: the royal spring), also called Chashma Shahi or Cheshma Shahi, is one of the Mughal gardens built in 1632 AD around a spring by Ali Mardan Khan, a governor of Mughal emperor Shah Jahan as per the orders of the Emperor, as a gift for his eldest son Prince Dara Shikoh. The garden is located in the Zabarwan Range, near Raj Bhawan (Governor's house) overlooking Dal Lake in Srinagar, Jammu and Kashmir, India.

== History ==
Chashme Shahi originally derives its name from the spring which was discovered by the great female saint of Kashmir, Rupa Bhawani, who was from the Sahib clan of Kashmiri Pandits. The family name of Rupa Bhawani was 'Sahib' and the spring was originally called 'Chashme Sahibi'. Over the years the name got corrupted and today the place is known as Chashme Shahi (the Royal Spring).

== Establishment ==
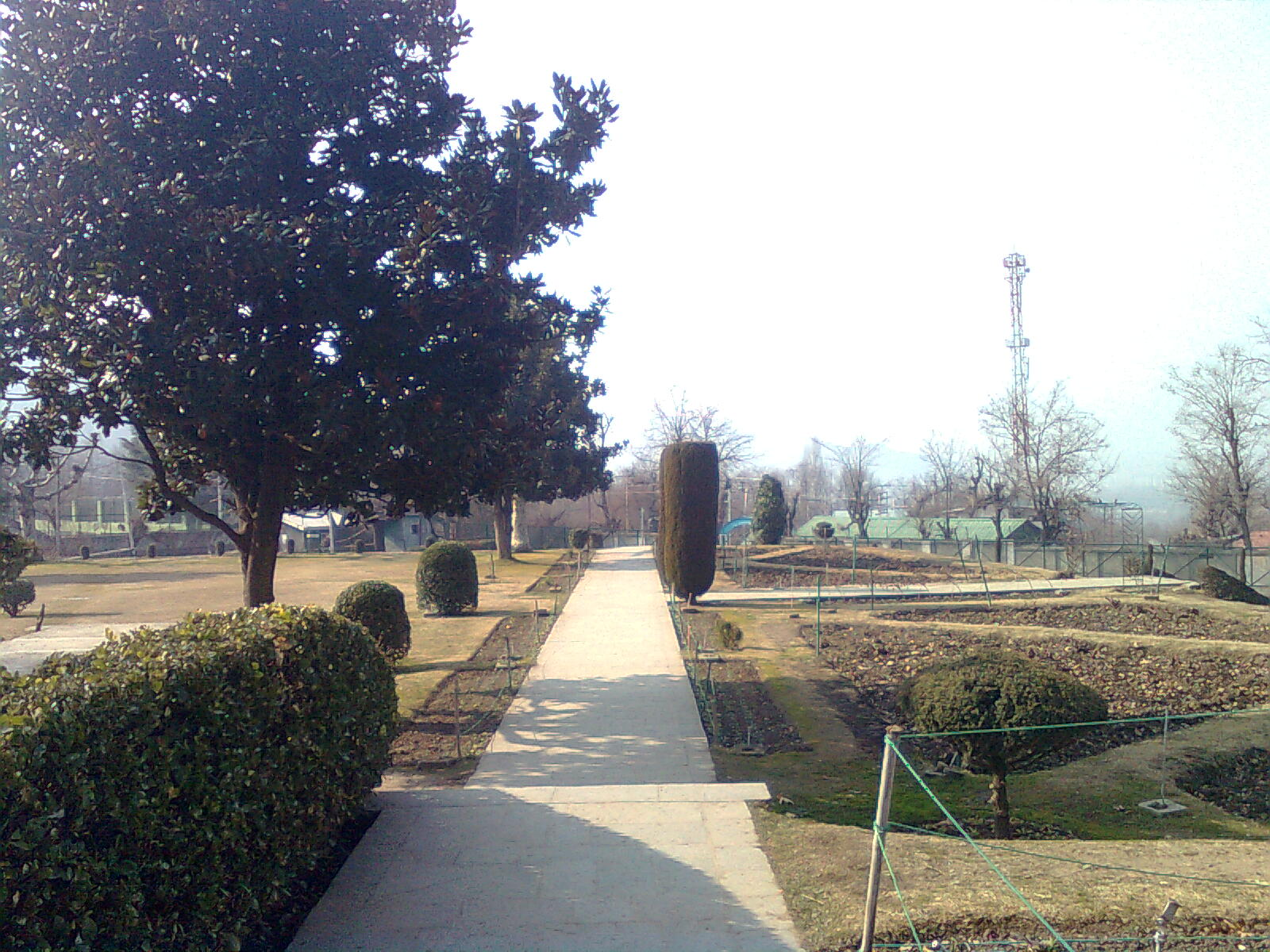
Chasme Shahi

The garden was constructed around the spring by the Mughal Governor Ali Mardan Khan in 1632. It was commissioned by the Mughal emperor Shah Jahan for his eldest son, Dara Sikoh. In the east of Chashma Shahi the Pari Mahal (Fairy Palace) lies where Dara Sikoh used to learn astrology. The garden is 108 m long and 38 m wide and is spread over one acre of land. It is the smallest garden among the three Mughal gardens of Srinagar; the Shalimar garden is the largest and the Nishat garden is the second largest. All the three gardens were built at the right bank of the Dal Lake, with the Zabarwan mountains (Zabarwan Range) as the backdrop.

== Architecture and the spring ==
The garden presents Mughal architecture as used in different Mughal gardens. The artistically built garden has Iranian influence in its art and architecture and the design is based on the Persian gardens. It is built around a freshwater spring, discovered by Rupa Bhawani, which flows through its centre in terraces. The topography and the steepness of the land has led to the formation of the garden. The main focus of the garden is the spring which flows down in terraces and is divided into three sections: an aqueduct, waterfall, and fountains. A two-storey Kashmiri hut stands at the first terrace which is the origin of the spring. The water then flows down through a water ramp (chadar) into the second terrace. The second terrace serves as a water pool and a large fountain stands at its centre. The water again flows down through a water ramp into the third terrace, which is a square five-fountain pool. It is the lowest pool at the entrance of the garden. The visitors are received through a flight of stairs on both sides of the terraces which leads up to the origin of the spring. The English writer and traveler Amit Kumar wrote about the garden that "the little Chashma Shahi is architecturally the most charming of the gardens near Srinagar". The water of the spring is believed to have some medicinal properties. The former Premier of India, Pandit Jawahar Lal Nehru, used to get the water from the spring to Delhi.

== Access ==
The Chashme Shahi is located within the jurisdiction of Srinagar city, 14 kilometres (9 mi) in the northeast from the Srinagar Airport. It is adjacent to Rajbhawan (Governor's house). The garden is connected by the Boulevard Road which passes along the banks of the Dal lake. There are many hotels and restaurants available for boarding and lodging near the garden. The garden remains open for tourists from March to November. The best time to visit the garden is from April to October. The garden is at full bloom during May and June.
