= Kashmir =

Region in South Asia

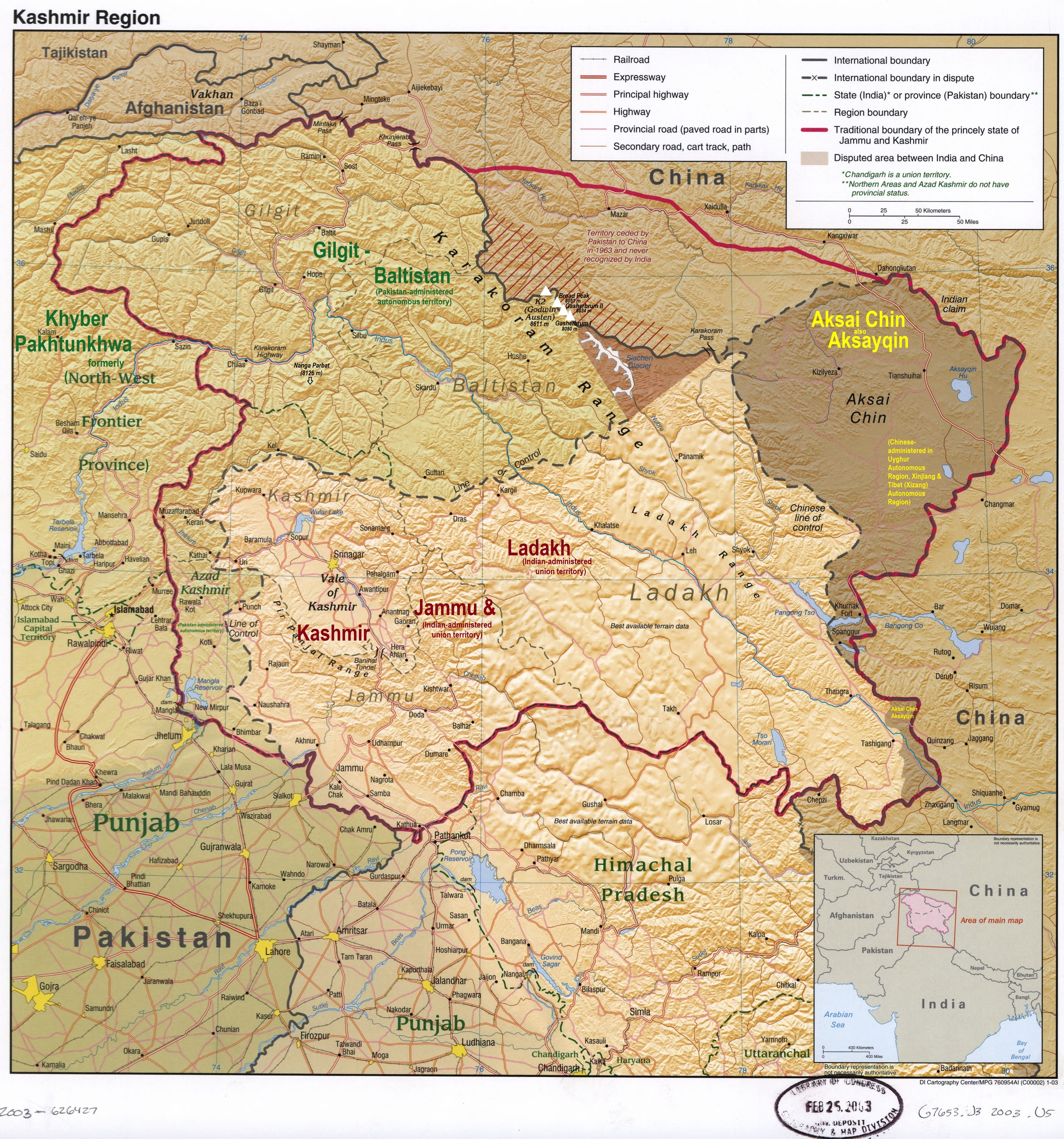
Political map of the Kashmir region

Kashmir (/ˈkæʃmɪər/ KASH-meer or /kæʃˈmɪər/ kash-MEER) is the northernmost geographical region of the Indian subcontinent. Until the mid-19th century, the term Kashmir denoted only the Kashmir Valley between the Great Himalayas and the Pir Panjal Range. The term has since also come to encompass a larger area that formerly comprised the princely state of Jammu and Kashmir, and includes the Indian-administered territories of Jammu and Kashmir and Ladakh, the Pakistani-administered territories of Azad Kashmir and Gilgit-Baltistan, and the Chinese-administered territories of Aksai Chin and the Trans-Karakoram Tract.

In the first millennium, the Kashmir region became an important centre of Buddhism. In the second half of the first millennium, the Karakotas ruled Kashmir, most notably Lalitaditya Muktapida; they were followed by the Loharas. Later still, in the ninth century, Kashmir Shaivism arose. In 1339, Shah Mir became the first Muslim ruler of Kashmir, inaugurating the Shah Miri dynasty dynasty, which ruled until 1568; most notable was Zain Ul Abedin. Sufism flowered, especially through Nund Rishi. Mughal rule began with Akbar, who conquered Kashmir in 1586, and lasted until 1751, followed by the Afghan Durrani Empire, which ruled from 1751 until 1820. That year, the Sikhs, under Ranjit Singh, annexed Kashmir. In 1846, after the Sikh defeat in the First Anglo-Sikh War, and upon the purchase of the region from the British under the Treaty of Amritsar, the Raja of Jammu, Gulab Singh, became the new ruler of Jammu and Kashmir. The rule of his descendants, under the paramountcy (or tutelage) of the British Crown, lasted until the Partition of India in 1947, when the former princely state of the British Indian Empire became a disputed territory, now administered by three countries: China, India, and Pakistan.

== Etymology ==
The word Kashmir is thought to have been derived from Sanskrit and was referred to as káśmīra. A popular local etymology of Kashmir is that it is land desiccated from water. An alternative etymology attributes the name to the Vedic sage Kashyapa, who is believed to have settled people in this land. Accordingly, Kashmir is derived from either kashyapa-mir (Kashyapa's Lake) or kashyapa-meru (Kashyapa's Mountain).

While early references to Kashmir can be found in Hindu texts such as Mahabharata and the puranas such as Matsya Purana, Vayu Purana, Padma Purana, Vishnu Purana, and Vishnudharmottara Purana, the earliest text which mentions the name Kashmir is the Ashtadhyayi by the Sanskrit grammarian Pāṇini in the 5th century BCE. Pāṇini calls the people of Kashmir Kashmirikas.

The Ancient Greeks called the region Kasperia, which has been identified with Kaspapyros of Hecataeus of Miletus (apud Stephanus of Byzantium) and Kaspatyros of Herodotus (3.102, 4.44). Kashmir is also believed to be the country meant by Ptolemy's Kaspeiria.

Kashmir is mentioned as "Sharada Desha" (land of Sharada), in the 11th century Sanskrit poems by Bilhana. Sharada refers to the Hindu goddess Saraswati, and Kashmir has been the seat of Sharada Peeth, one of the historical centers of learning in the Indian subcontinent.

Kashmir is known as Kasheer in Kashmiri language. Buddhist scholar and traveller Huientsang called it kia-shi-milo, while some other Chinese accounts refer to Kashmir as ki-pin and ache-pin. Cashmere is an archaic spelling of Kashmir used in English.

=== Terminology ===
The Government of India and Indian sources refer to the territory under Pakistan control as "Pakistan-occupied Kashmir" ("POK"). The Government of Pakistan and Pakistani sources refer to the portion of Kashmir administered by India as "Indian-occupied Kashmir" ("IOK") or "Indian-held Kashmir" (IHK). The terms "Pakistan-administered Kashmir" and "India-administered Kashmir" are generally used by neutral sources for the parts of the Kashmir region controlled by each country.

== History ==
After a period of cultural flowering under Hindu dynasties—most notably the Karkota and Lohara dynasties—Hindu rule in Kashmir ended in 1339 with the rise of the Shah Mir dynasty. Rule of the native Chak dynasty followed, and lasted until 1586, when the region was conquered by the Mughal Empire under Akbar. Kashmir was annexed by the Afghan Durrani Empire in 1752.

=== Sikh rule ===
In 1819, the Kashmir Valley passed from the control of the Durrani Empire of Afghanistan to the conquering armies of the Sikhs under Ranjit Singh of the Punjab, thus ending four centuries of Muslim rule under the Mughals and the Afghan regime. As the Kashmiris had suffered under the Afghans, they initially welcomed the new Sikh rulers. However, the Sikh governors turned out to be hard taskmasters, and Sikh rule was generally considered oppressive, protected perhaps by the remoteness of Kashmir from the capital of the Sikh Empire in Lahore. The Sikhs enacted a number of anti-Muslim laws, which included handing out death sentences for cow slaughter, closing down the Jamia Masjid in Srinagar, and banning the adhan, the public Muslim call to prayer. Kashmir had also now begun to attract European visitors, several of whom wrote of the abject poverty of the vast Muslim peasantry and of the exorbitant taxes under the Sikhs. High taxes, according to some contemporary accounts, had depopulated large tracts of the countryside, allowing only one-sixteenth of the cultivable land to be cultivated. Many Kashmiri peasants migrated to the plains of the Punjab. However, after a famine in 1832, the Sikhs reduced the land tax to half the produce of the land and also began to offer interest-free loans to farmers; Kashmir became the second highest revenue earner for the Sikh Empire. During this time Kashmir shawls became known worldwide, attracting many buyers, especially in the West.

The state of Jammu, which had been on the ascendant after the decline of the Mughal Empire, came under the sway of the Sikhs in 1770. Further in 1808, it was fully conquered by Maharaja Ranjit Singh. Gulab Singh, then a youngster in the House of Jammu, enrolled in the Sikh troops and, by distinguishing himself in campaigns, gradually rose in power and influence. In 1822, he was anointed as the Raja of Jammu. Along with his able general Zorawar Singh Kahluria, he conquered and subdued Rajouri (1821), Kishtwar (1821), Suru valley and Kargil (1835), Ladakh (1834–1840), and Baltistan (1840), thereby surrounding the Kashmir Valley. He became a wealthy and influential noble in the Sikh court.

=== Princely state ===
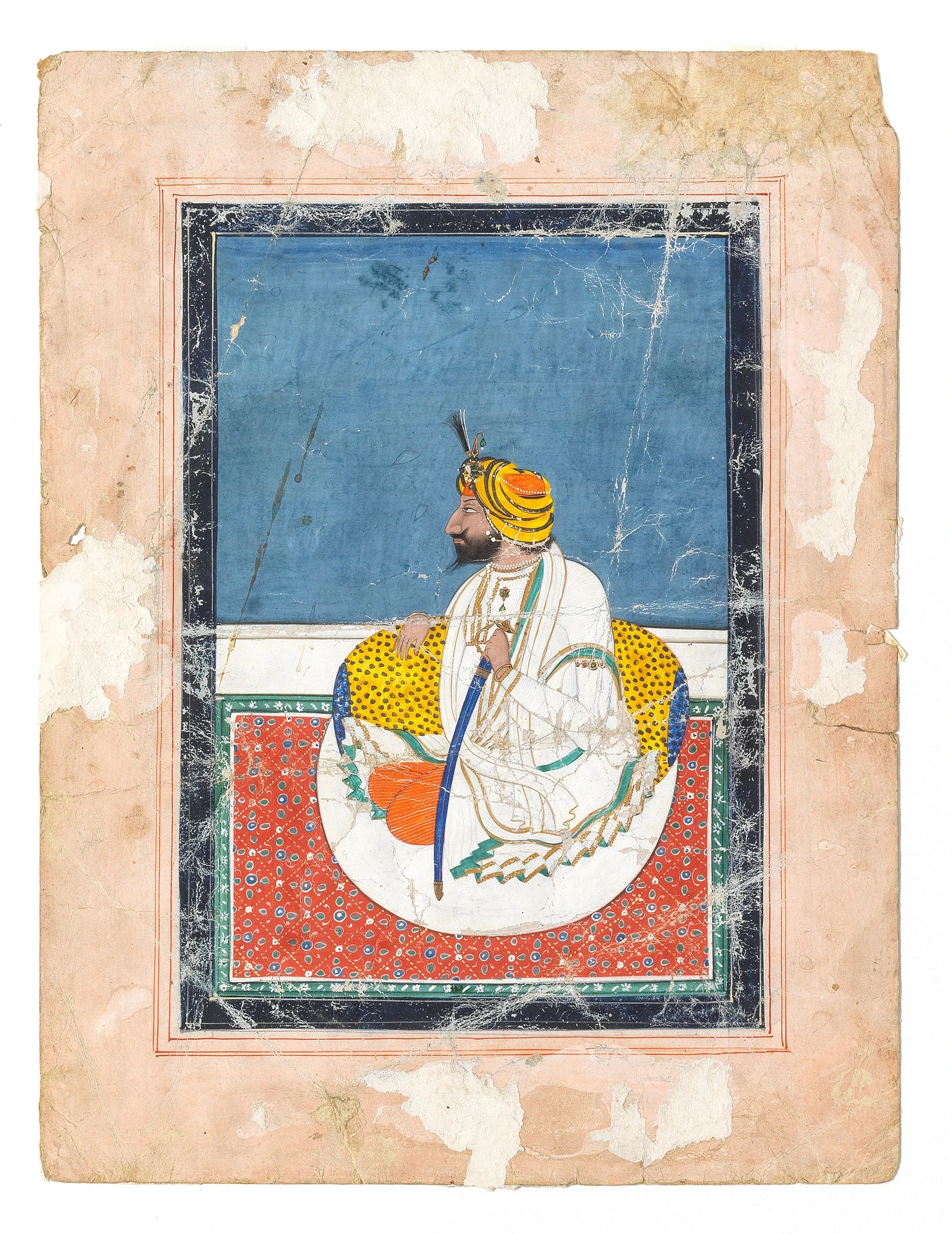
Gulab Singh, the first Maharaja of the princely state of Jammu and Kashmir

In 1845, the First Anglo-Sikh War broke out. According to The Imperial Gazetteer of India:

Gulab Singh contrived to hold himself aloof till the battle of Sobraon (1846), when he appeared as a useful mediator and the trusted advisor of Sir Henry Lawrence. Two treaties were concluded. By the first the State of Lahore (i.e. West Punjab) handed over to the British, as equivalent for one crore indemnity, the hill countries between the rivers Beas and Indus; by the second the British made over to Gulab Singh for 75 lakhs all the hilly or mountainous country situated to the east of the Indus and the west of the Ravi i.e. the Vale of Kashmir.

Drafted by a treaty and a bill of sale, and constituted between 1820 and 1858, the Princely State of Kashmir and Jammu (as it was first called) combined disparate regions, religions, and ethnicities: to the east, Ladakh was ethnically and culturally Tibetan and its inhabitants practised Buddhism; to the south, Jammu had a mixed population of Hindus, Muslims and Sikhs. In the heavily populated central Kashmir valley, the population was overwhelmingly Muslim—mostly Sunni; however, there was also a small but influential Hindu minority, the brahmin Kashmiri Pandits. To the northeast, sparsely populated Baltistan had a population ethnically related to that of Ladakh, but which practised Shia Islam. To the north, also sparsely populated, the Gilgit Agency was an area of diverse, mostly Shia groups, and, to the west, the Punch was populated mostly by Muslims of a different ethnicity than that of the Kashmir valley. After the Indian Rebellion of 1857, in which Kashmir sided with the British, and the subsequent assumption of direct rule by Great Britain, the princely state of Kashmir came under the suzerainty of the British Crown.

In the British census of India of 1941, Kashmir registered a Muslim majority population of 77%, a Hindu population of 20% and a sparse population of Buddhists and Sikhs comprising the remaining 3%. That same year, Prem Nath Bazaz, a Kashmiri Pandit journalist, wrote: "The poverty of the Muslim masses is appalling. ... Most are landless laborers, working as serfs for absentee [Hindu] landlords ... Almost the whole brunt of official corruption is borne by the Muslim masses." Under Hindu rule, Muslims faced hefty taxation and discrimination in the legal system and were forced into labour without any wages. Conditions in the princely state caused a significant migration of people from the Kashmir Valley to the Punjab of British India. For almost a century, until the census, a small Hindu elite had ruled over a vast and impoverished Muslim peasantry. Driven into docility by chronic indebtedness to landlords and moneylenders, having no education besides, nor awareness of rights, the Muslim peasants had no political representation until the 1930s.

=== 1947 and 1948 ===
1909 Map of the Princely State of Kashmir and Jammu

Ranbir Singh's grandson Hari Singh, who had ascended the throne of Kashmir in 1925, was the reigning monarch in 1947 at the conclusion of British rule of the subcontinent and the subsequent partition of the British Indian Empire into the newly independent Dominion of India and the Dominion of Pakistan. According to Burton Stein's History of India,

Kashmir was neither as large nor as old an independent state as Hyderabad; it had been created rather off-handedly by the British after the first defeat of the Sikhs in 1846, as a reward to a former official who had sided with the British. The Himalayan kingdom was connected to India through a district of the Punjab, but its population was 77 percent Muslim, and it shared a boundary with Pakistan. Hence, it was anticipated that the maharaja would accede to Pakistan when the British paramountcy ended on 14–15 August. When he hesitated to do this, Pakistan launched a guerrilla onslaught meant to frighten its ruler into submission. Instead, the Maharaja appealed to Mountbatten for assistance, and the governor-general agreed on the condition that the ruler accede to India. Indian soldiers entered Kashmir and drove the Pakistani-sponsored irregulars from all but a small section of the state. The United Nations was then invited to mediate the quarrel. The UN mission insisted that the opinion of Kashmiris must be ascertained, while India insisted that no referendum could occur until all of the state had been cleared of irregulars.

In the last days of 1948, a ceasefire was agreed under UN auspices. However, since the plebiscite demanded by the UN was never conducted, relations between India and Pakistan soured, and eventually led to two more wars over Kashmir in 1965 and 1999.

=== Current status and political divisions ===
The disputed territory of the princely state of Jammu and Kashmir divided between: Pakistan India China

India has control of about half the area of the former princely state of Jammu and Kashmir, which comprises Jammu and Kashmir and Ladakh, while Pakistan controls a third of the region, divided into two provinces, Azad Kashmir and Gilgit-Baltistan. Jammu and Kashmir and Ladakh are administered by India as union territories. They formed a single state until 5 August 2019, when the state was bifurcated, and its limited autonomy was revoked.

According to Encyclopædia Britannica:

Although there was a clear Muslim majority in Kashmir before the 1947 partition, and its economic, cultural, and geographic contiguity with the Muslim-majority area of the Punjab (in Pakistan) could be convincingly demonstrated, the political developments during and after the partition resulted in a division of the region. Pakistan was left with territory that, although basically Muslim in character, was sparsely populated, relatively inaccessible, and economically underdeveloped. The largest Muslim group, situated in the Valley of Kashmir and estimated to number more than half the population of the entire region, lay in India-administered territory, with its former outlets via the Jhelum valley route blocked.

The eastern region of the former princely state of Kashmir is also involved in a boundary dispute that began in the late 19th century and continues into the 21st century. Although some boundary agreements were signed between Great Britain, Afghanistan, and Russia over the northern borders of Kashmir, China never accepted these agreements, and China's official position has not changed following the communist revolution of 1949 that established the People's Republic of China. By the mid-1950s, the Chinese army had entered the north-east portion of Ladakh.

By 1956–57, they had completed a military road through the Aksai Chin area to provide better communication between Xinjiang and western Tibet. India's belated discovery of this road led to border clashes between the two countries that culminated in the Sino-Indian War of October 1962.

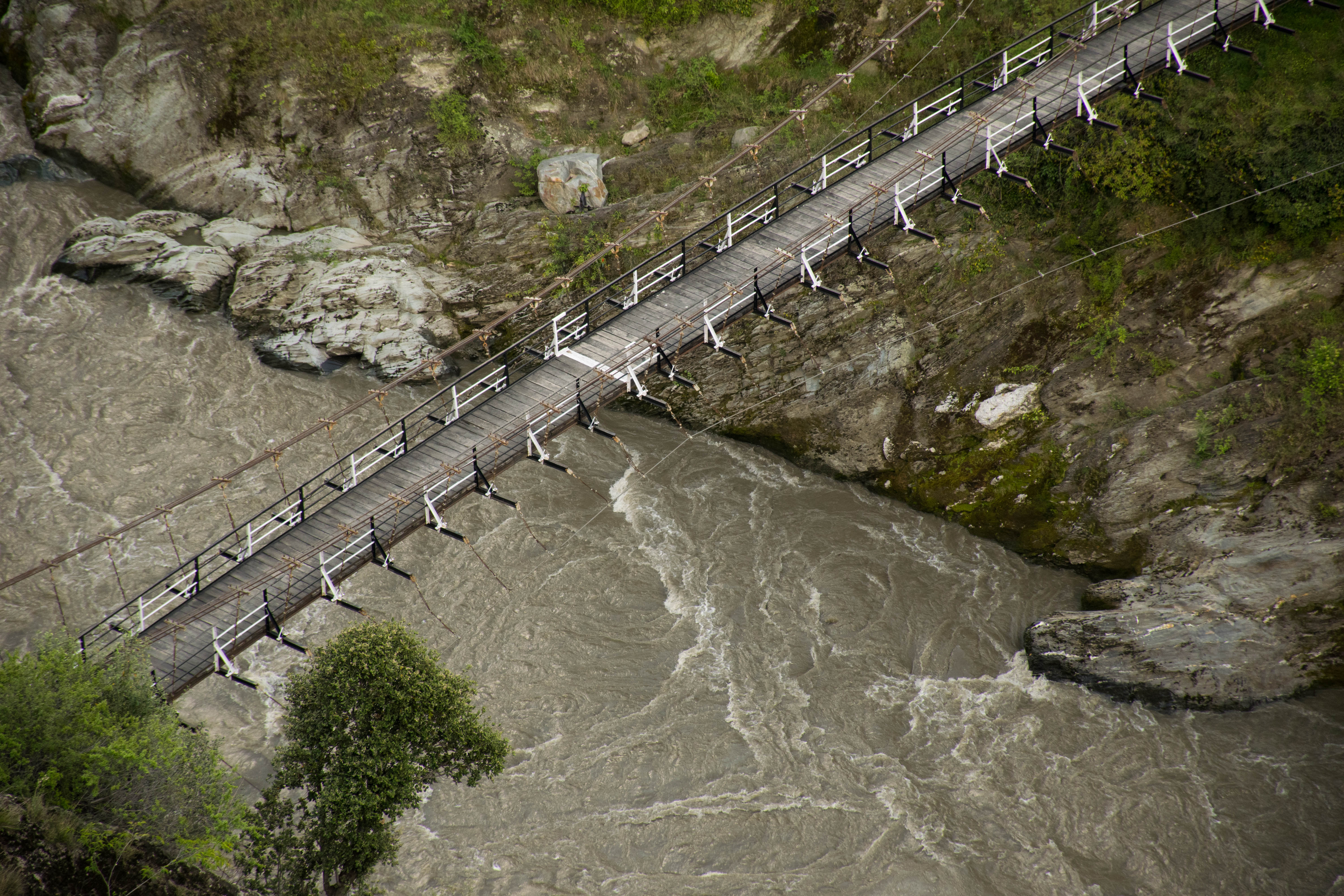
A white border painted on a suspended bridge delineates Azad Kashmir from Jammu and Kashmir

The region is divided among three countries in a territorial dispute: Pakistan controls the northwest portion (Northern Areas and Azad Jammu Kashmir), India controls the central and southern portion (Jammu and Kashmir) and Ladakh, and the People's Republic of China controls the northeastern portion (Aksai Chin and the Trans-Karakoram Tract). India controls the majority of the Siachen Glacier area, including the Saltoro Ridge passes, while Pakistan controls the lower territory just southwest of the Saltoro Ridge. India controls 101,338 km^{2} (39,127 sq mi) of the disputed territory, Pakistan controls 85,846 km^{2} (33,145 sq mi), and the People's Republic of China controls the remaining 37,555 km^{2} (14,500 sq mi).

Jammu and Azad Kashmir lie south and west of the Pir Panjal range, and are under the control of India and Pakistan, respectively. These are populous regions. Gilgit-Baltistan, formerly known as the Northern Areas, is a group of territories in the extreme north, bordered by the Karakoram, the western Himalayas, the Pamir, and the Hindu Kush ranges. With its administrative centre in the town of Gilgit, the Northern Areas cover an area of 72,971 square kilometres (28,174 sq mi) and have an estimated population approaching 1 million (10 lakhs).

Ladakh is between the Kunlun mountain range in the north and the main Great Himalayas to the south. Capital towns of the region are Leh and Kargil. It is under Indian administration and was part of the state of Jammu and Kashmir until 2019. It is one of the most sparsely populated regions in the area and is mainly inhabited by people of Indo-Aryan and Tibetan descent. Aksai Chin is a vast high-altitude desert of salt that reaches altitudes up to 5,000 metres (16,000 ft). Geographically part of the Tibetan Plateau, Aksai Chin is referred to as the Soda Plain. The region is almost uninhabited, with no permanent settlements.

Though these regions are in practice administered by their respective claimants, neither India nor Pakistan has formally recognised the accession of the areas claimed by the other. India claims those areas, including the area "ceded" to China by Pakistan in the Trans-Karakoram Tract in 1963, are a part of its territory, while Pakistan claims the entire region, excluding Aksai Chin and Trans-Karakoram Tract. The two countries have fought several declared wars over the territory. The Indo-Pakistani War of 1947 established the rough boundaries of today, with Pakistan holding roughly one-third of Kashmir, and India one-half, with a dividing line of control established by the United Nations. The Indo-Pakistani War of 1965 resulted in a stalemate and a UN-negotiated ceasefire.

== Geography ==
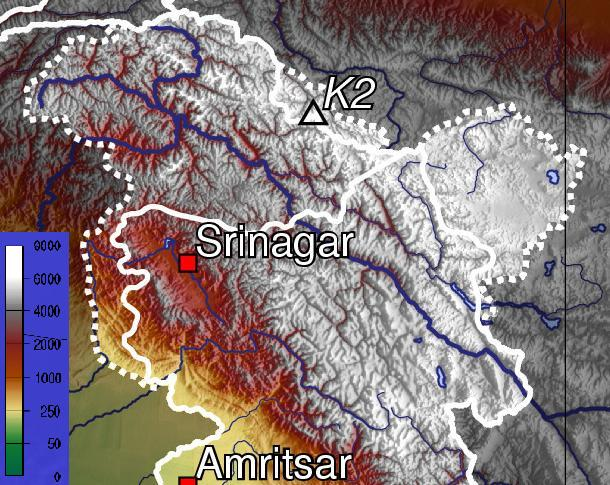
Topographic map of Kashmir

The Kashmir region lies between latitudes 32° and 36° N, and longitudes 74° and 80° E. It has an area of 68,000 mi^{2} (180,000 km^{2}). It is bordered to the north and east by China (Xinjiang and Tibet), to the northwest by Afghanistan (Wakhan Corridor), to the west by Pakistan (Khyber Pakhtunkhwa and Punjab) and to the south by India (Himachal Pradesh and Punjab).

The topography of Kashmir is mostly mountainous. It is traversed mainly by the Western Himalayas. The Himalayas terminate in the western boundary of Kashmir at Nanga Parbat. Kashmir is traversed by three rivers, namely the Indus, the Jhelum, and the Chenab. These river basins divide the region into three valleys separated by high mountain ranges. The Indus valley forms the north and north-eastern portion of the region, which includes bare and desolate areas of Baltistan and Ladakh. The upper portion of the Jhelum valley forms the proper Vale of Kashmir, surrounded by high mountain ranges. The Chenab valley forms the southern portion of the Kashmir region, with its denuded hills towards the south. It includes almost all of the Jammu region. High altitude lakes are frequent at high elevations. Lower down in the Vale of Kashmir, there are many freshwater lakes and large areas of swamplands, which include Wular Lake, Dal Lake, and Hokersar near Srinagar.

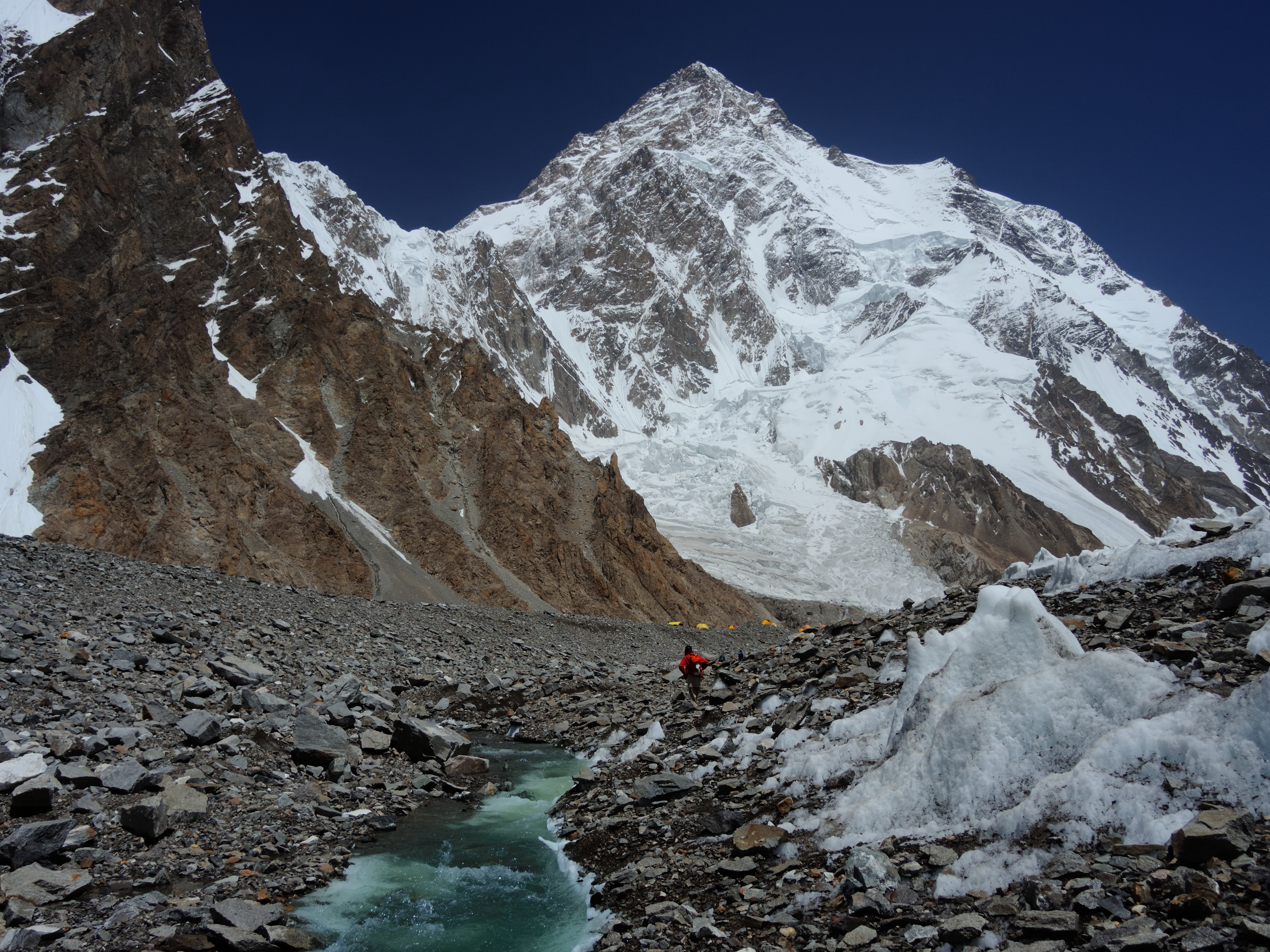
K2, the second-highest mountain in the world

To the north and northeast, beyond the Great Himalayas, the region is traversed by the Karakoram mountains. To the northwest lies the Hindu Kush mountain range. The upper Indus River separates the Himalayas from the Karakoram. The Karakoram is the most heavily glaciated part of the world outside the polar regions. The Siachen Glacier at 76 km (47 mi) and the Biafo Glacier at 63 km (39 mi) rank as the world's second and third longest glaciers outside the polar regions. Karakoram is home to four eight-thousander mountain peaks, with K2, the second-highest peak in the world at 8,611 m (28,251 ft).

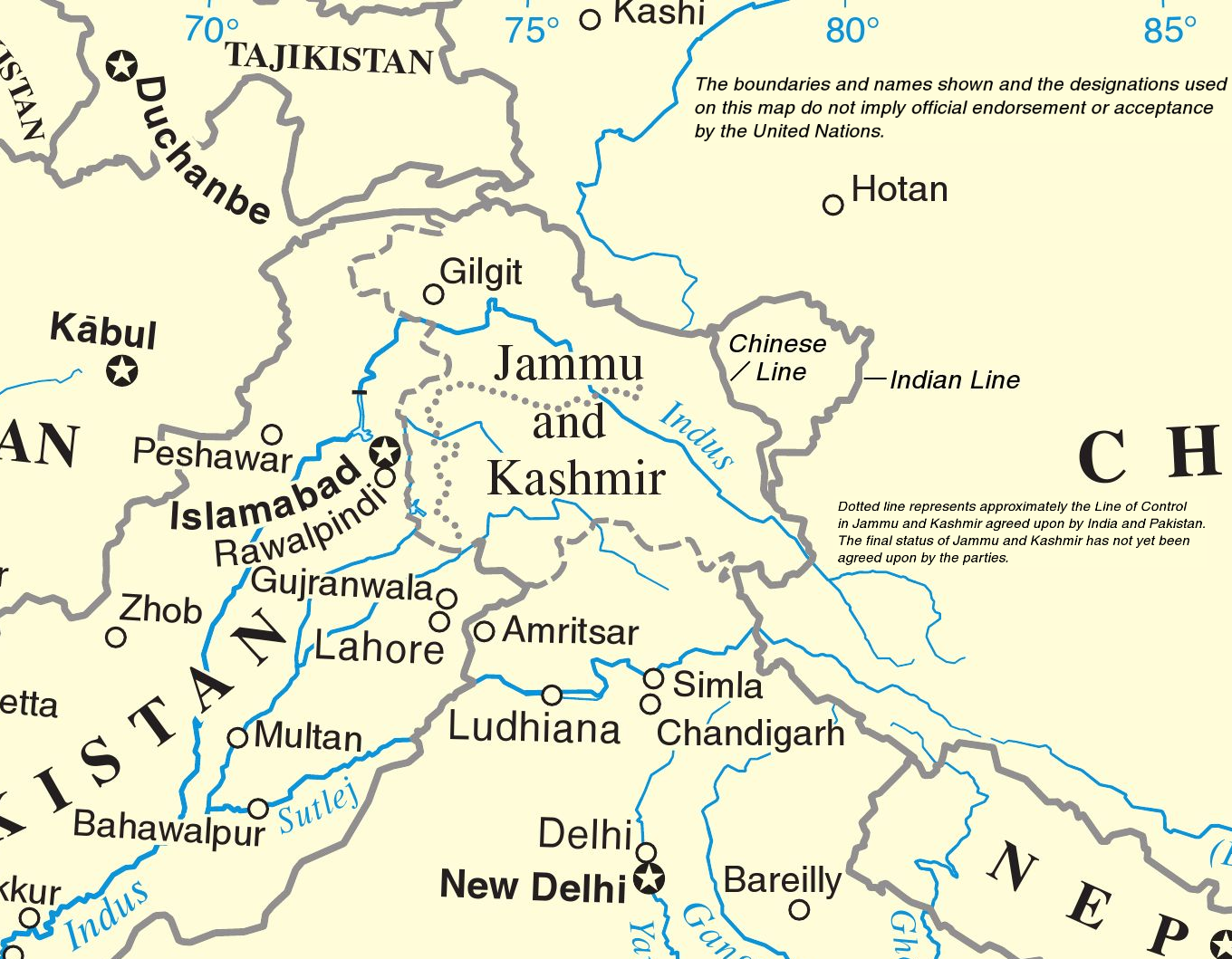
Hydrography of Kashmir

The Indus River system forms the drainage basin of the Kashmir region. The river enters the region in Ladakh at its southeastern corner from the Tibetan Plateau, and flows northwest to run a course through the entire Ladakh and Gilgit-Baltistan. Almost all the rivers originating in this region are part of the Indus River system. After reaching the end of the Great Himalayan range, the Indus turns a corner and flows southwest into the Punjab plains. The Jhelum and Chenab rivers also follow a course roughly parallel to this, and join the Indus River in southern Punjab plains in Pakistan.

The geographical features of the Kashmir region differ considerably from one part to another. The lowest part of the region consists of the plains of Jammu at the southwestern corner, which continue into the plains of Punjab at an elevation of below 1000 feet. Mountains begin at 2000 feet, then raise to 3000–4000 feet in the "Outer Hills", a rugged country with ridges and long narrow valleys. Next within the tract lie the Middle Mountains, which are 8000–10,000 feet in height with ramifying valleys. Adjacent to these hills are the lofty Great Himalayan ranges (14000–15000 feet), which divide the drainage of the Chenab and Jehlum from that of the Indus. Beyond this range lies a wide tract of mountainous country of 17000–22000 feet in Ladakh and Baltistan.

=== Climate ===
Srinagar

Climate chart (precipitation, max. and min. temperature)
J	F	M	A	M	J	J	A	S	O	N	D
61 7 −2	82 11 −1	105 16 4	90 21 8	62 25 11	46 29 15	59 30 18	68 30 18	38 28 13	23 23 6	28 16 1	54 10 −2
- █ Average max. and min. temperatures in °C
- █ Precipitation totals in mm
- Source: WMO
Imperial conversion
J	F	M	A	M	J	J	A	S	O	N	D
2.4 45 29	3.2 51 31	4.1 60 40	3.5 69 46	2.4 76 52	1.8 83 59	2.3 86 65	2.7 85 64	1.5 82 56	0.9 73 43	1.1 61 34	2.1 50 29
- █ Average max. and min. temperatures in °F
- █ Precipitation totals in inches

Kashmir has a different climate for every region owing to the significant variation in altitude. The temperatures range from the subtropical heat of the Punjab summer to the intensity of the cold, which keeps the perpetual snow on the mountains. Jammu Division, excluding the upper parts of the Chenab Valley, features a humid subtropical climate. The Vale of Kashmir has a moderate climate. The Astore Valley and some parts of Gilgit-Baltistan feature a semi-Tibetan climate. While the other parts of Gilgit-Baltistan and Ladakh have a Tibetan climate, which is considered an almost rainless climate.

The southwestern Kashmir, which includes much of the Jammu province and Muzaffarabad, falls within the reach of the Indian monsoon. The Pir Panjal Range acts as an effective barrier and blocks these monsoon tracts from reaching the main Kashmir Valley and the Himalayan slopes. These areas of the region receive much of their precipitation from the wind currents of the Arabian Sea. The Himalayan slope and the Pir Panjal witness greatest snow melting from March until June. These variations in snow melt and rainfall have led to destructive inundations of the main valley. One instance of such Kashmir flood of a larger proportion is recorded in the 12th-century book Rajatarangini. A single cloudburst in July 1935 caused the upper Jhelum river level to rise 11 feet. The 2014 Kashmir floods inundated the Kashmir city of Srinagar and submerged hundreds of other villages.

== Flora and fauna ==
Kashmir has a recorded forest area of 20,230 km^{2} (7,810 sq mi) along with some national parks and reserves. The forests vary according to the climatic conditions and the altitude. Kashmir forests range from the subtropical deciduous forests in the foothills of Jammu and Muzaffarabad, to the temperate forests throughout the Vale of Kashmir and to the alpine grasslands and high altitude meadows in Gilgit-Baltistan and Ladakh.

The Kashmir region has four well-defined zones of vegetation in the tree growth, due to the elevation difference. The subtropical forests up to 1500 m are known as the Phulai (Acacia modesta) and Olive (Olea cuspid ata) Zone. There occur semi-deciduous species of Shorea robusta, Senegalia catechu, Dalbergia sissoo, Albizia lebbeck, Garuga pinnata, Terminalia bellirica, and Tilia tomentosa, as well as Pinus roxburghii are found at higher elevations. The temperate zone between (1,500–3,500 m) is referred as the Chir Pine (Finns longifolia). This zone is dominated by oaks (Quercus spp.) and Rhododendron spp. The Blue Pine (Finns excelsa) Zone alongside Cedrus deodara, Abies pindrow, and Picea smithiana occurs at elevations between 2,800 and 3,500 m. The Birch (Betula utilis) Zone has Herbaceous genera of Anemone, Geranium, Iris, Lloydia, Potentilla, and Primula interspersed with dry dwarf alpine scrubs of Berberis, Cotoneaster, Juniperus, and Rhododendron, which are prevalent in alpine grasslands at 3,500 m and above.

Kashmir is often referred to as a beauty spot for the medicinal and herbaceous flora in the Himalayas. There are hundreds of different species of wild flowers recorded in the alpine meadows of the region. The botanical garden and the tulip gardens of Srinagar, built in the Zabarwans, grow 300 breeds of flora and 60 varieties of tulips, respectively. The latter is considered Asia's largest Tulip Garden.

The Kashmir region is home to several rare animal species, many of which are protected by sanctuaries and reserves. The Dachigam National Park in the Valley is home to the last viable population of Kashmir stag (Hangul) and the largest population of black bear in Asia. In Gilgit-Baltistan, the Deosai National Park is designated to protect the largest population of Himalayan brown bears in the western Himalayas. Snow leopards are found in high density in the Hemis National Park in Ladakh. The region is home to musk deer, markhor, leopard cat, jungle cat, red fox, jackal, Himalayan wolf, serow, Himalayan yellow-throated marten, long-tailed marmot, Indian crested porcupine, Himalayan mouse-hare, langur, and Himalayan weasel. At least 711 bird species are recorded in the valley alone with 31 classified as globally threatened species.

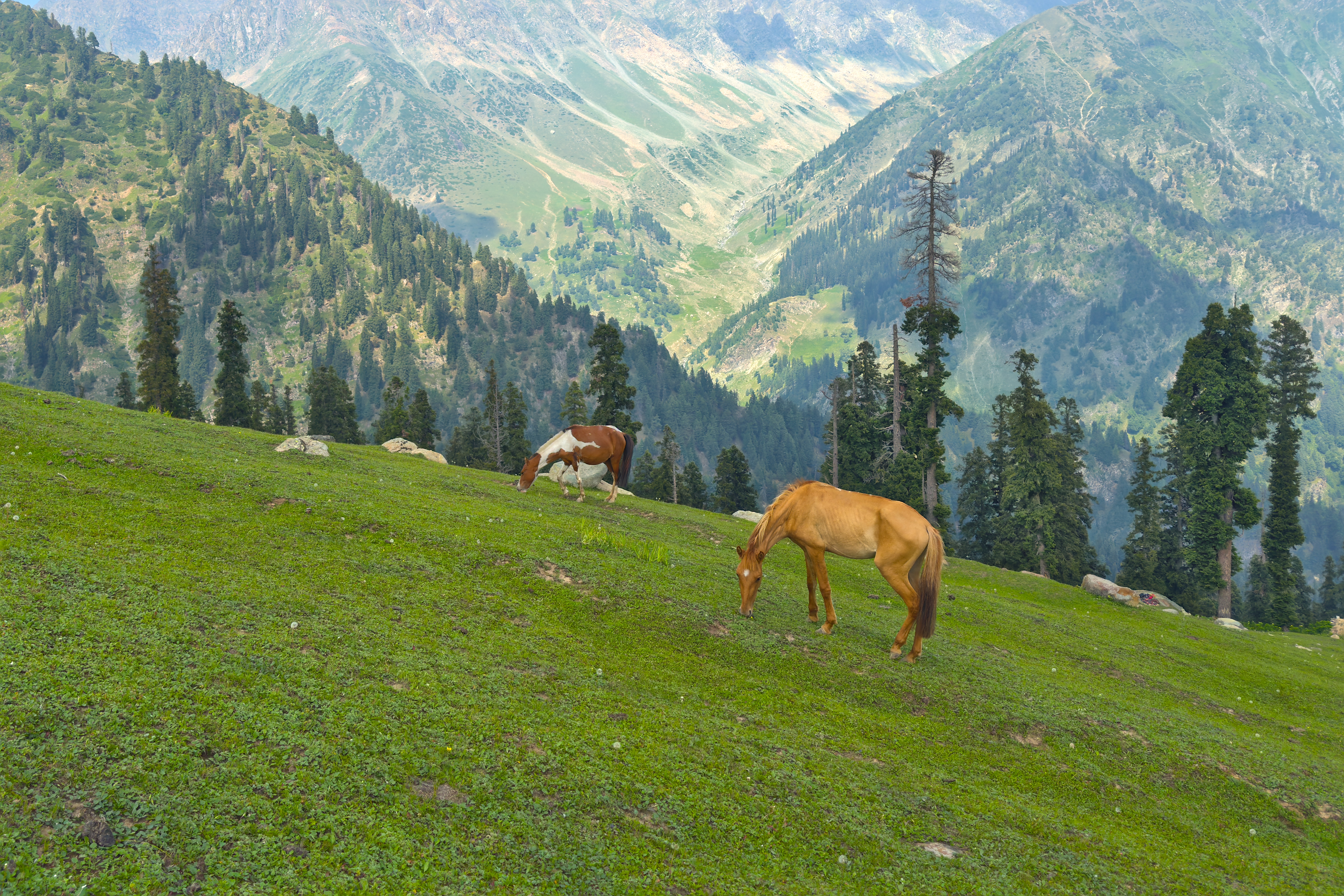
Horses grazing at a Himalayan meadow below the Gangabal Lake in Jammu and Kashmir

Snow Leopard with prey at the Hemis National Park in Ladakh

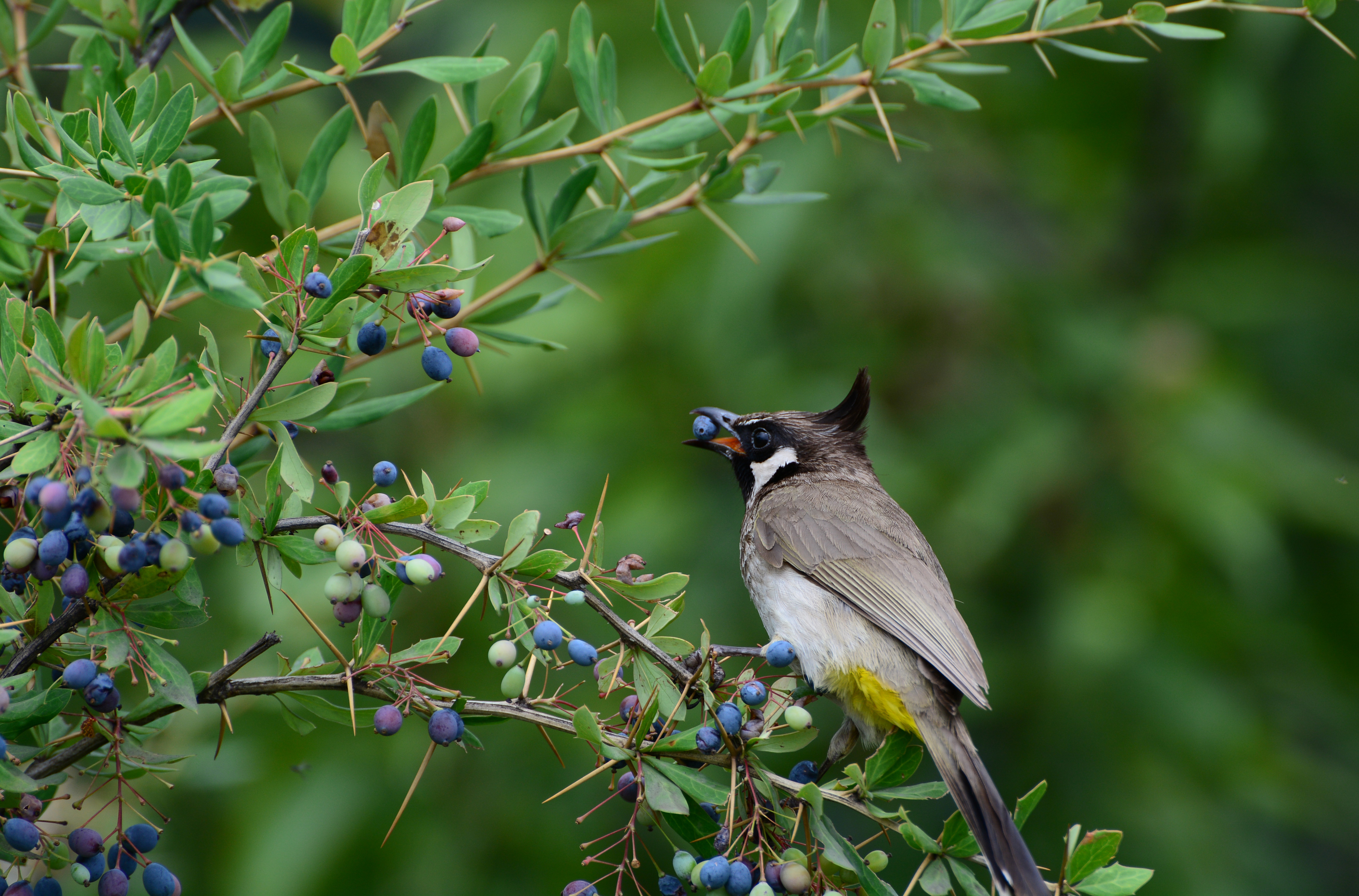
Himalayan bulbul eating berries near Mehmood Gali, Azad Jammu and Kashmir

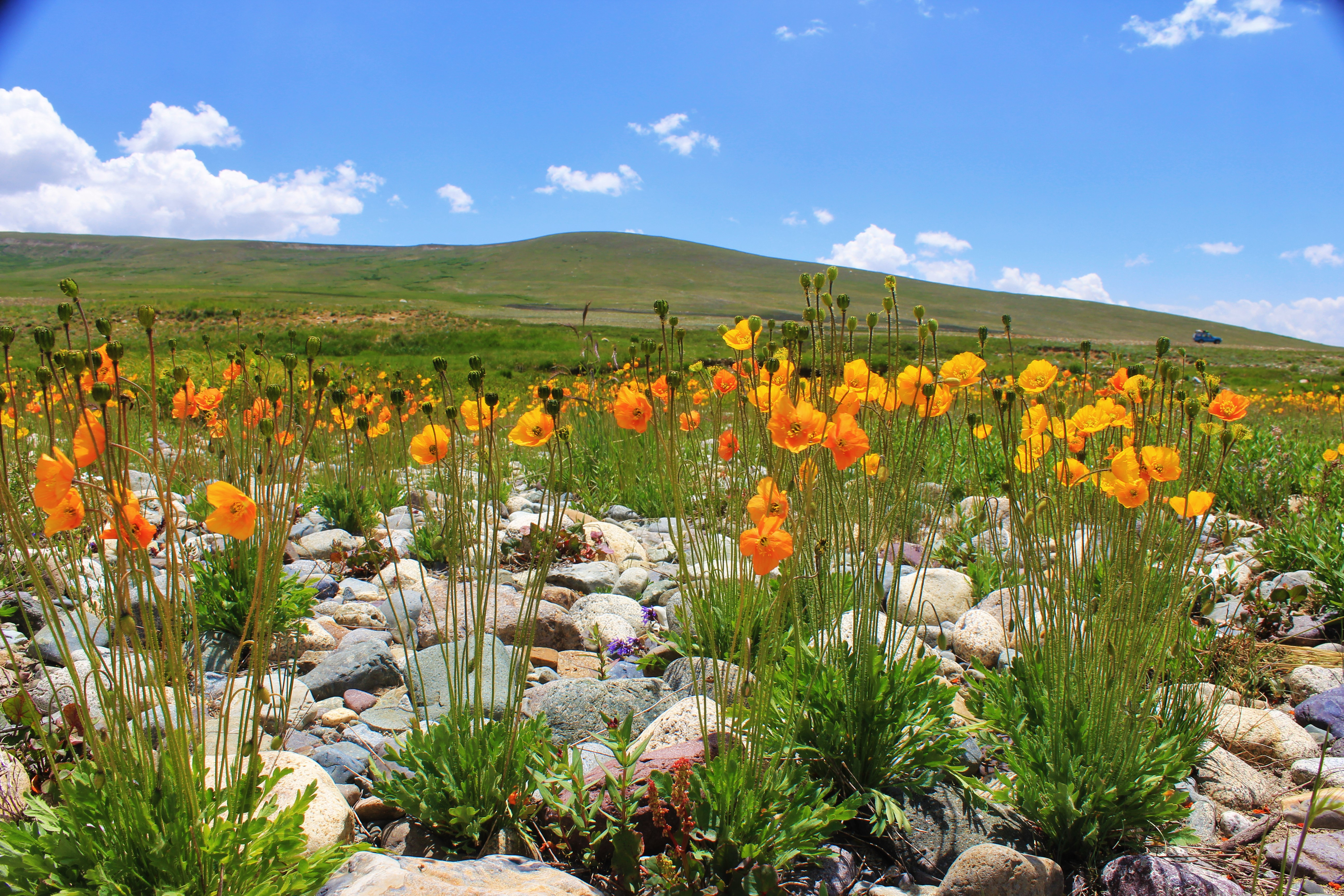
Wildflowers in the Deosai National Park of Gilgit-Baltistan

== Demographics ==
=== Colonial era ===
In the 1901 Census of the British Indian Empire, the population of the princely state of Kashmir and Jammu was 2,905,578. Of these, 2,154,695 (74.16%) were Muslims, 689,073 (23.72%) Hindus, 25,828 (0.89%) Sikhs, and 35,047 (1.21%) Buddhists (implying 935 (0.032%) others).

The Hindus resided mostly in Jammu, where they constituted a little less than 60% of the population. In the Kashmir Valley, the Hindus represented 5.24% of the population, and in the frontier wazarats of Ladakh and Gilgit, Hindus formed 0.94% of the population. As per the 1901 Census, the population of Kashmir Valley was 1,157,394, with 1,083,766 Muslims (93.6%), and 60,641 Hindus. In the Jammu province, Hindus numbered 626,177, contributing to 90.87% of the Hindu population of the princely state of Jammu and Kashmir. Amongst the Hindus, the largest castes recorded in the census were Brahmans (186,000), the Rajputs (167,000), the Khattris (48,000) and the Thakkars (93,000).

As per the 1911 Census of the British Raj, the population had increased to 3,158,126 individuals. Of these, 2,398,320 (75.94%) were Muslims, 696,830 (22.06%) were Hindus, 31,658 (1%) were Sikhs, and 36,512 (1.16%) were Buddhists. In the last census of British India in 1941, the total population was estimated to be 3,945,000 (an estimate from the 1931 Census, as no enumeration was done due to the Second World War). Of these, the Muslim population was estimated to be 2,997,000 (75.97%), the Hindu population at 808,000 (20.48%), and the Sikh population at 55,000 (1.39%).

The Kashmiri Pandits, the only Hindus of the Kashmir valley, who had constituted approximately four to five percent of the population of the valley during the Dogra rule (1846–1947), and 20% of whom had left the Kashmir valley to other parts of India in the 1950s, underwent a complete exodus in the 1990s due to the Kashmir insurgency. According to conservative estimates, approximately 100,000 of the total Kashmiri Pandit population of 140,000 left the valley during that decade, while some authors have suggested a higher figure for the exodus, ranging from the entire population of over 150 thousand, to 190 thousand of a total Pandit population of 200 thousand (200,000), to a number as high as 300 thousand (300,000).

Population of Jammu & Kashmir Princely State by Province (1901–1941)
Census Year	Jammu Province		Kashmir Province		Frontier Regions		Total
Census Year	Pop.	%	Pop.	%	Pop.	%	Pop.
1901	1,521,307	52.36%	1,157,394	39.83%	226,877	7.81%	2,905,578
1911	1,597,865	50.6%	1,295,201	41.01%	265,060	8.39%	3,158,126
1921	1,640,259	49.4%	1,407,086	42.38%	273,173	8.23%	3,320,518
1931	1,788,441	49.05%	1,569,218	43.04%	288,584	7.91%	3,646,243
1941	1,981,433	49.27%	1,728,705	42.99%	311,478	7.75%	4,021,616

Religious groups in Jammu & Kashmir Princely State (British India era)
Religious group	1901		1911		1921		1931		1941	
Religious group	Pop.	%	Pop.	%	Pop.	%	Pop.	%	Pop.	%
Islam	2,154,695	74.16%	2,398,320	75.94%	2,548,514	76.75%	2,817,636	77.28%	3,101,247	77.11%
Hinduism	689,073	23.72%	690,390	21.86%	692,641	20.86%	736,222	20.19%	809,165	20.12%
Buddhism	35,047	1.21%	36,512	1.16%	37,685	1.13%	38,724	1.06%	40,696	1.01%
Sikhism	25,828	0.89%	31,553	1%	39,507	1.19%	50,662	1.39%	65,903	1.64%
Jainism	442	0.02%	345	0.01%	529	0.02%	597	0.02%	910	0.02%
Christianity	422	0.01%	975	0.03%	1,634	0.05%	2,263	0.06%	3,509	0.09%
Tribal	—N/a	—N/a	—N/a	—N/a	—N/a	—N/a	134	0%	51	0%
Zoroastrianism	11	0%	31	0%	7	0%	5	0%	29	0%
Judaism	—N/a	—N/a	—N/a	—N/a	—N/a	—N/a	—N/a	—N/a	10	0%
Others	60	0%	0	0%	1	0%	0	0%	95	0%
Total	2,905,578	100%	3,158,126	100%	3,320,518	100%	3,646,243	100%	4,021,616	100%
Note: The Princely State of Jammu and Kashmir includes the contemporary administrative divisions of Jammu, Kashmir, Ladakh, Azad Kashmir, and Gilgit-Baltistan.

=== Modern era ===
As per the 2011 Census of India, the population of the India-administered union territories of Jammu and Kashmir and Ladakh combined was 12,541,302. In 2017, the population of Pakistan-administered territories of Azad Kashmir and Gilgit-Baltistan were recorded as is 4,045,366 and 1,492,924 respectively.

People in Jammu speak Hindi, Punjabi, and Dogri, Kashmiri is the most spoken language in the Kashmiri valley, and people in Ladakh speak Tibetan language, and Balti.

Administered by	Region	Population	Religion			
Administered by	Region	Population	% Muslim	% Hindu	% Buddhist	% Others
India	Kashmir Valley	~6.90 million	95%	4%	—N/a	
India	Jammu	~5.37 million	30%	66%	—N/a	4%
India	Ladakh	~0.27 million	46%	—N/a	50%	3%
Pakistan	Azad Kashmir	~4.05 million	99%	—N/a		
Pakistan	Gilgit-Baltistan	~1.49 million	99%	—N/a		
China	Aksai Chin	—N/a				
China	Trans-Karakoram	—N/a				

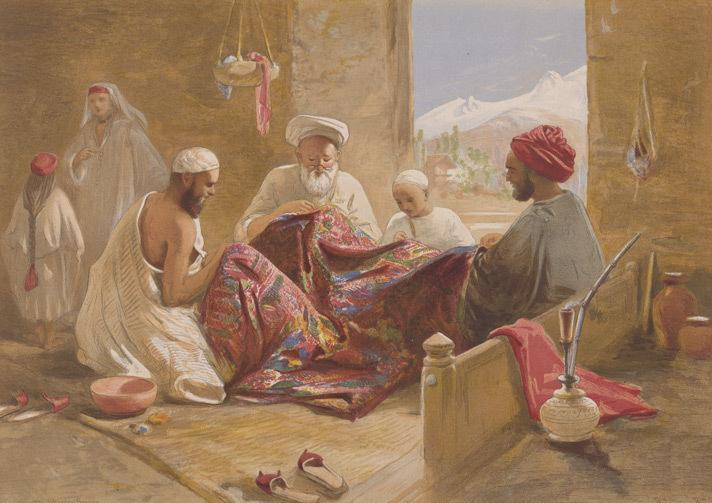
A Muslim shawl-making family shown in Cashmere shawl manufactory, 1867, chromolithograph, William Simpson

A group of Pandits, or Brahmin priests, in Kashmir, photographed by an unknown photographer in the 1890s

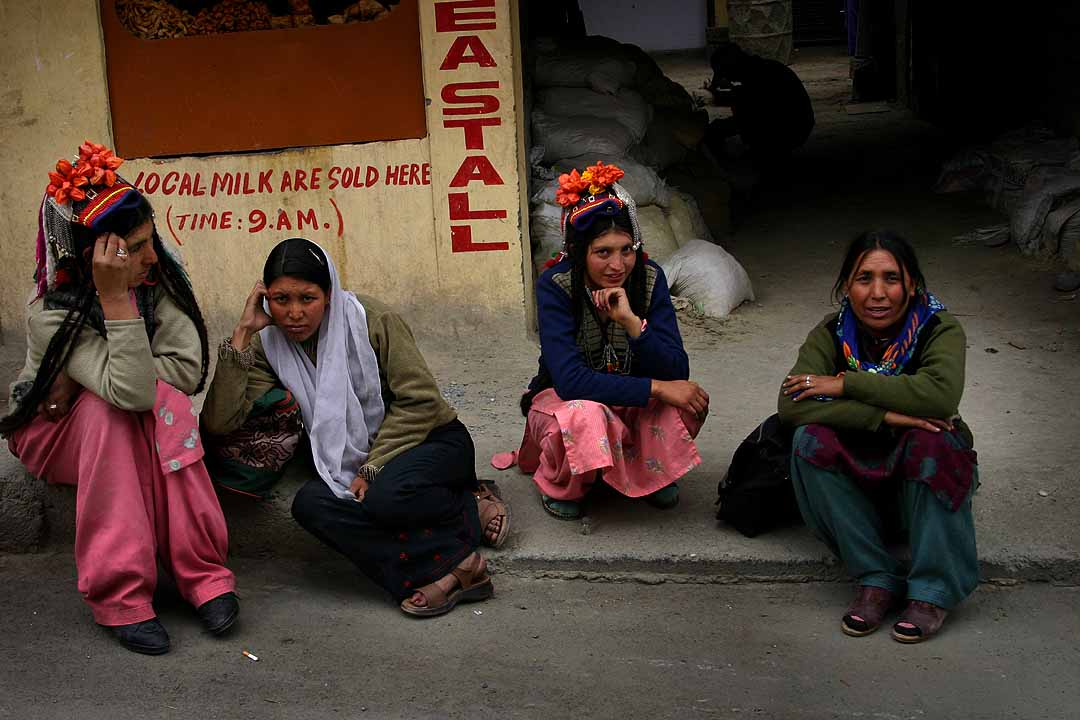
Brokpa women from Kargil, northern Ladakh, in local costumes

== Economy ==
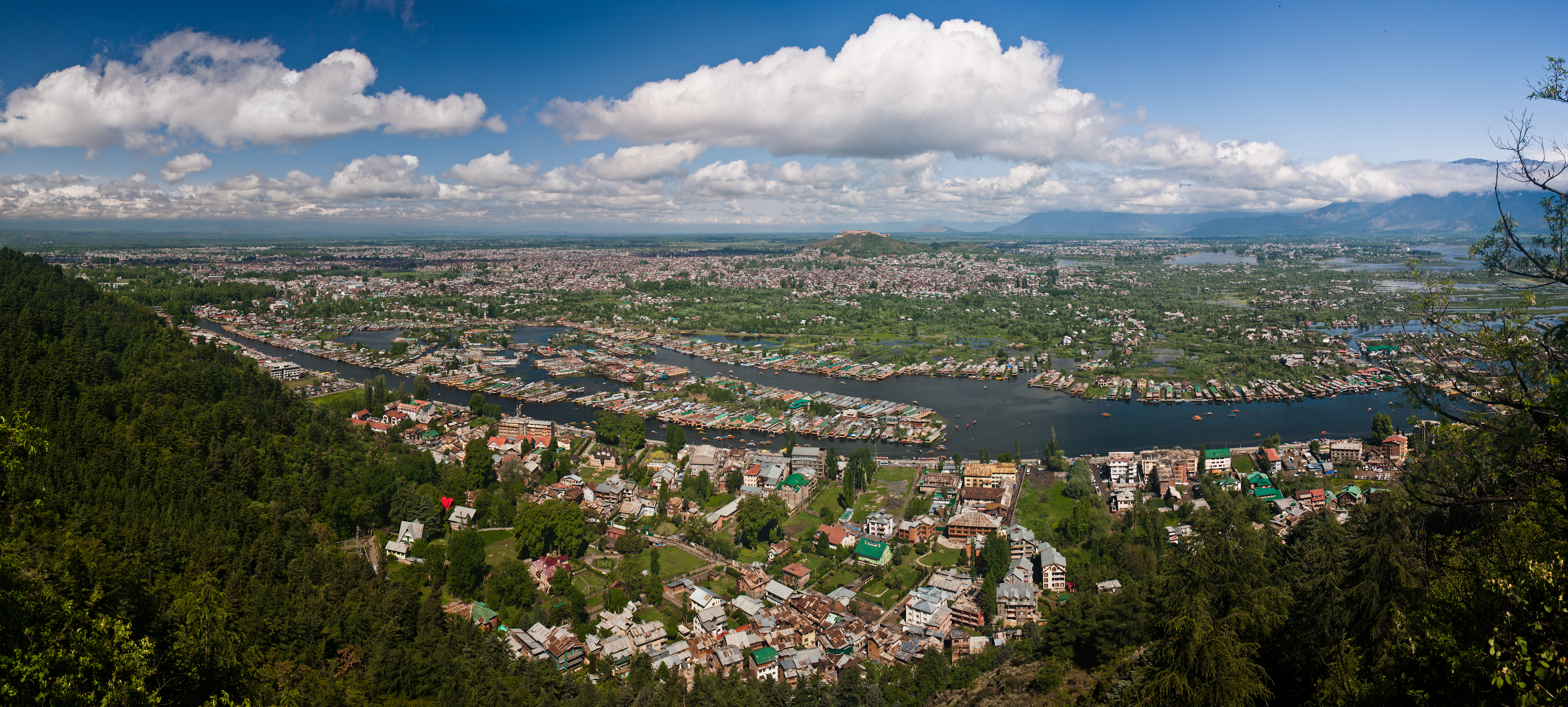
Srinagar, the largest city in Kashmir

Kashmir's economy is centred around agriculture. Traditionally the staple crop of the valley was rice, which formed the chief food of the people. In addition, Indian corn, wheat, barley and oats were also grown. Given its temperate climate, it is suited for crops like asparagus, artichoke, seakale, broad beans, scarletrunners, beetroot, cauliflower and cabbage. Fruit trees are common in the valley, and the cultivated orchards yield pears, apples, peaches, and cherries. The chief trees are deodar, firs and pines, chinar or plane, maple, birch and walnut, apple, cherry.

Historically, Kashmir became known worldwide when Cashmere wool was exported to other regions and nations (exports have ceased due to decreased abundance of the cashmere goat and increased competition from China). Kashmiris are well adept at knitting and making Pashmina shawls, silk carpets, rugs, kurtas, and pottery. Saffron, too, is grown in Kashmir. Srinagar is known for its silver-work, papier-mâché, wood-carving, and the weaving of silk. The economy was badly damaged by the 2005 Kashmir earthquake which, as of 8 October 2005, resulted in over 70,000 deaths in the Pakistan-administered territory of Azad Kashmir and around 1,500 deaths in the India-administered territory of Jammu and Kashmir.

=== Transport ===
Transport is predominantly by air or road vehicles in the region. The Jammu–Baramulla line is a 324 km (201 mi) long modern railway line in the region that connects Baramulla, in the northwestern part of the Kashmir Valley, through Srinagar, Banihal and Katra, to Jammu in the southwestern part of the Jammu region, and thence to the larger rail network in India. It became operational in June 2025.

== In culture ==
Irish poet Thomas Moore's 1817 romantic poem Lalla Rookh is credited with having made Kashmir (spelt Cashmere in the poem) "a household term in Anglophone societies", conveying the idea that it was a kind of paradise.

== See also ==
- 1941 Census of Jammu and Kashmir
- Human rights abuses in Kashmir
- Kashmiris
- List of territorial disputes

== Bibliography ==
=== General history ===
- Asher, C. B.; Talbot, C. (2008). India Before Europe t. Cambridge University Press. ISBN 978-0-521-51750-8.
- Bose, Sugata; Jalal, Ayesha (2003), Modern South Asia: History, Culture, Political Economy, London and New York: Routledge, 2nd edition. Pp. xiii, 304, ISBN 978-0-415-30787-1.
- Brown, Judith M. (1994), Modern India: The Origins of an Asian Democracy, Oxford and New York: Oxford University Press. Pp. xiii, 474, ISBN 978-0-19-873113-9.
- Copland, Ian (2002), The Princes of India in the Endgame of Empire, 1917–1947, Cambridge University Press, ISBN 978-0-521-89436-4, archived from the original on 17 January 2023
- Khan, Yasmin (2007), The Great Partition: The Making of India and Pakistan, New Haven and London: Yale University Press, 250 pages, ISBN 978-0-300-12078-3
- Kulke, H.; Rothermund, D. (2016). A History of India. 6th. Routledge. ISBN 978-1-138-96114-2.
- Kulke, Hermann; Rothermund, Dietmar (2004), A History of India, 4th edition. Routledge, Pp. xii, 448, ISBN 978-0-415-32920-0.
- Ludden, D. (2014). India and South Asia: A Short History (2nd, revised ed.). Oneworld Publications. ISBN 978-1-85168-936-1.
- Metcalf, Barbara; Metcalf, Thomas R. (2006), A Concise History of Modern India (Cambridge Concise Histories), Cambridge and New York: Cambridge University Press. Pp. xxxiii, 372, ISBN 978-0-521-68225-1.
- Ramusack, Barbara (2004), The Indian Princes and their States (The New Cambridge History of India), Cambridge and London: Cambridge University Press. Pp. 324, ISBN 978-0-521-03989-5
- Stein, B. (2010). Arnold, D. (ed.). A History of India (2nd ed.). Oxford: Wiley-Blackwell. ISBN 978-1-4051-9509-6.
- Stein, Burton (2001), A History of India, New Delhi and Oxford: Oxford University Press. Pp. xiv, 432, ISBN 978-0-19-565446-2.
- Talbot, Ian; Singh, Gurharpal (2009), The Partition of India, Cambridge University Press. Pp. xviii, 206, ISBN 978-0-521-76177-2
- Truschke, Audrey (2025). India: 5,000 Years of History on the Subcontinent. Princeton University Press. ISBN 9780691221229.
- Wolpert, Stanley (2006), Shameful Flight: The Last Years of the British Empire in India, Oxford and New York: Oxford University Press. Pp. 272, ISBN 978-0-19-515198-5.

=== Kashmir history ===
- Bose, Sumantra (1997), The Challenge in Kashmir: Democracy, Self-Determination and a Just Peace, SAGE Publications, ISBN 978-0-8039-9350-1, archived from the original on 17 January 2023
- Bose, Sumantra (2003), Kashmir: Roots of Conflict, Paths to Peace, Harvard University Press, ISBN 978-0-674-01173-1, archived from the original on 17 January 2023
- Keenan, Brigid (2013), Travels in Kashmir, Hachette India, ISBN 978-93-5009-729-8
- Korbel, Josef (1966) [1954], Danger in Kashmir (second ed.), Princeton University Press, ISBN 978-1-4008-7523-8, archived from the original on 17 January 2023
- Lamb, Alastair (1991) [first published 1991 by Roxford Books], Kashmir: A Disputed Legacy, 1846–1990, Oxford University Press, ISBN 978-0-19-577423-8, archived from the original on 17 January 2023
- Lamb, Alastair (2002) [first published 1997 by Roxford Books], Incomplete Partition: The Genesis of the Kashmir Dispute, 1947–1948, Oxford: Oxford University Press, ISBN 978-0-19-579767-1, archived from the original on 17 January 2023
- Malik, Iffat (2005), Kashmir: Ethnic Conflict, International Dispute, Oxford University Press, ISBN 978-0-19-579622-3, archived from the original on 17 January 2023
- Panikkar, K. M. (1930), Gulab Singh, London: Martin Hopkinson Ltd
- Rai, Mridu (2004), Hindu Rulers, Muslim Subjects: Islam, Rights, and the History of Kashmir, C. Hurst & Co, ISBN 978-1-85065-661-6
- Rao, Aparna, ed. (2008), The Valley of Kashmir: The Making and Unmaking of a Composite Culture?, Manohar Publishers & Distributors, ISBN 978-81-7304-751-0, archived from the original on 17 January 2023
  - Evans, Alexander (2008), "Kashmiri Exceptionalism", in Rao, Aparna (ed.), The Valley of Kashmir: The Making and Unmaking of a Composite Culture?, pp. 713–741
  - Kaw, Mushtaq A. (2008), "Land Rights in Rural Kashmir: A Study in Continuity and Change from Late-Sixteenth to Late-Twentieth Centuries", in Rao, Aparna (ed.), The Valley of Kashmir: The Making and Unmaking of a Composite Culture?, pp. 207–234
  - Khan, Mohammad Ishaq (2008), "Islam, State and Society in Medieval Kashmir: A Revaluation of Mir Sayyid Ali Hamadani's Historical Role", in Rao, Aparna (ed.), The Valley of Kashmir: The Making and Unmaking of a Composite Culture?, pp. 97–198
  - Madan, T. N. (2008), "Kashmir, Kashmiris, Kashmiriyat: An Introductory Essay", in Rao, Aparna (ed.), The Valley of Kashmir: The Making and Unmaking of a Composite Culture?, pp. 1–36
  - Reynolds, Nathalène (2008), "Revisiting Key Episodes in Modern Kashmir History", in Rao, Aparna (ed.), The Valley of Kashmir: The Making and Unmaking of a Composite Culture?, pp. 563–604
  - Witzel, Michael (2008), "The Kashmiri Pandits: Their Early History", in Rao, Aparna (ed.), The Valley of Kashmir: The Making and Unmaking of a Composite Culture?, pp. 37–96
  - Zutshi, Chitraleka (2008), "Shrines, Political Authority, and Religious Identities in Late-Nineteenth and Early-Twentieth-century Kashmir", in Rao, Aparna (ed.), The Valley of Kashmir: The Making and Unmaking of a Composite Culture?, pp. 235–258
- Schaffer, Howard B. (2009), The Limits of Influence: America's Role in Kashmir, Brookings Institution Press, ISBN 978-0-8157-0370-9, archived from the original on 17 January 2023
- Schofield, Victoria (2003) [2000], Kashmir in Conflict, London and New York: I. B. Taurus & Co, ISBN 978-1-86064-898-4, archived from the original on 7 March 2023
- Singh, Bawa Satinder (1971), "Raja Gulab Singh's Role in the First Anglo-Sikh War", Modern Asian Studies, 5 (1): 35–59, doi:10.1017/s0026749x00002845, JSTOR 311654, S2CID 145500298
- Zutshi, Chitralekha (2004), Languages of Belonging: Islam, Regional Identity, and the Making of Kashmir, C. Hurst & Co. Publishers, ISBN 978-1-85065-700-2

=== Historical sources ===
- Blank, Jonah. "Kashmir–Fundamentalism Takes Root", Foreign Affairs, 78.6 (November/December 1999): 36–42.
- Drew, Federic. 1877. The Northern Barrier of India: a popular account of the Jammoo and Kashmir Territories with Illustrations; 1st edition: Edward Stanford, London. Reprint: Light & Life Publishers, Jammu. 1971.
- Evans, Alexander. Why Peace Won't Come to Kashmir, Current History (Vol 100, No 645) April 2001 p. 170–175.
- Hussain, Ijaz. 1998. "Kashmir Dispute: An International Law Perspective", National Institute of Pakistan Studies.
- Irfani, Suroosh, ed "Fifty Years of the Kashmir Dispute": Based on the proceedings of the International Seminar held at Muzaffarabad, Azad Jammu and Kashmir 24–25 August 1997: University of Azad Jammu and Kashmir, Muzaffarabad, AJK, 1997.
- Joshi, Manoj Lost Rebellion: Kashmir in the Nineties (Penguin, New Delhi, 1999).
- Khan, L. Ali The Kashmir Dispute: A Plan for Regional Cooperation Archived 17 January 2023 at the Wayback Machine 31 Columbia Journal of Transnational Law, 31, p. 495 (1994).
- Knight, E. F. 1893. Where Three Empires Meet: A Narrative of Recent Travel in: Kashmir, Western Tibet, Gilgit, and the adjoining countries. Longmans, Green, and Co., London. Reprint: Ch'eng Wen Publishing Company, Taipei. 1971.
- Knight, William, Henry. 1863. Diary of a Pedestrian in Cashmere and Thibet. Richard Bentley, London. Reprint 1998: Asian Educational Services, New Delhi.
- Köchler, Hans. The Kashmir Problem between Law and Realpolitik. Reflections on a Negotiated Settlement Archived 2 April 2010 at the Wayback Machine. Keynote speech delivered at the "Global Discourse on Kashmir 2008." European Parliament, Brussels, 1 April 2008.
- Moorcroft, William and Trebeck, George. 1841. Travels in the Himalayan Provinces of Hindustan and the Panjab; in Ladakh and Kashmir, in Peshawar, Kabul, Kunduz, and Bokhara... from 1819 to 1825, Vol. II. Reprint: New Delhi, Sagar Publications, 1971.
- Neve, Arthur. (Date unknown). The Tourist's Guide to Kashmir, Ladakh, Skardo &c. 18th Edition. Civil and Military Gazette, Ltd., Lahore. (The date of this edition is unknown – but the 16th edition was published in 1938).
- Stein, M. Aurel. 1900. Kalhaṇa's Rājataraṅgiṇī–A Chronicle of the Kings of Kaśmīr, 2 vols. London, A. Constable & Co. Ltd. 1900. Reprint, Delhi, Motilal Banarsidass, 1979.
- Younghusband, Francis and Molyneux, Edward 1917. Kashmir. A. & C. Black, London.
- Norelli-Bachelet, Patrizia. "Kashmir and the Convergence of Time, Space and Destiny", 2004; ISBN 0-945747-00-4. First published as a four-part series, March 2002 – April 2003, in 'Prakash', a review of the Jagat Guru Bhagavaan Gopinath Ji Charitable Foundation. Kashmir and the Convergence of Time Space and Destiny by Patrizia Norelli Bachelet Archived 28 September 2007 at the Wayback Machine
- Muhammad Ayub. An Army; Its Role & Rule (A History of the Pakistan Army from Independence to Kargil 1947–1999). Pittsburgh: Rosedog Books, 2005. ISBN 0-8059-9594-3.
