= Pari Mahal =

Mughal garden in Srinagar, India

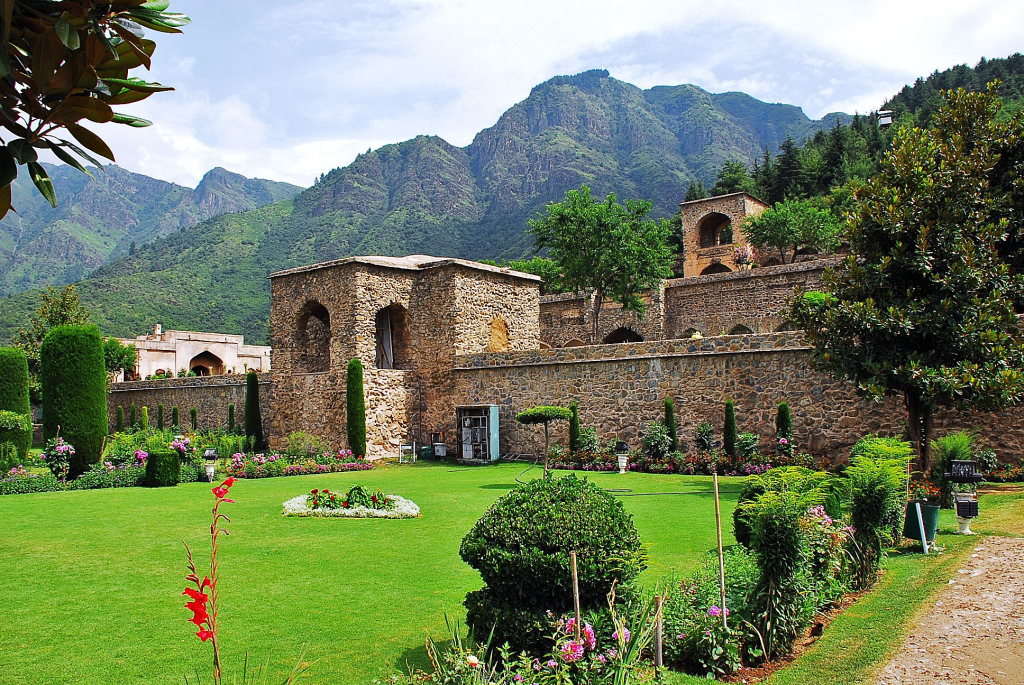
- Interactive map of Pari Mahal
- 34°04′52″N 74°52′38″E
- Type: Garden
- Location: Dal Lake, Srinagar, India

History
- Founder: Shah Jahan
- Built: 1650; 376 years ago
- Built for: Residence of Haano and Maano

Site notes
- Elevation: 5,200 feet (1,600 m)
- Current use: closed
- Governing body: Government of Jammu and Kashmir
- Website: srinagar.nic.in/tourist-place/pari-mahal/

Pari Mahal (lit. 'palace of fairies') is a seven-terraced Mughal garden built on the top of the Zabarwan mountain range. It overlooks the city of Srinagar and the south-west of Dal Lake in the Indian union territory of Jammu and Kashmir. This garden is a fine example of Islamic architecture and patronage of art during the reign of the then Mughal Emperor Shah Jahan, featuring arched doorways, terraced gardens, and intricate water channels. The garden is a popular tourist destination and also provides a view of Dal Lake and the city below.

== History ==
Pari Mahal was built in the mid-1600s by Dara Shikoh, the eldest son of Mughal emperor Shah Jahan. It was constructed on the ruins of an old Buddhist monastery. It also served as a library and a learning center for subjects like astrology and astronomy. Dara Shikoh is believed to have stayed here in the years 1640, 1645, and 1654. Later, the garden came under the ownership of the Government of Jammu and Kashmir.

Over time, Pari Mahal has also been used as a top-secret interrogation centre and as a base for high-level bureaucrats. In recent times, the location has been used to film several movies, including the Bollywood movie Lamhaa.

== See also ==
- Indira Gandhi Memorial Tulip Garden
- Mughal Gardens
