= Mount Mahadev =

Mountain peak in Jammu and Kashmir, India

Mahadev
- Location within Jammu and Kashmir Location within India

Highest point
- Elevation: 3,966 m (13,012 ft)
- Coordinates: 34°9′8.791″N 74°58′54.2″E

Geography
- Location: Srinagar, Kashmir Valley, India
- Parent range: Zabarwan

Climbing
- Easiest route: From Faqir Gujri via Lidwas.

Mahadev (also known as Mahadev peak) is a mountain in the vicinity of the city of Srinagar, the summer capital of Indian-administered union territory of Jammu and Kashmir. With an altitude of 3,966 metres (13,012 ft), it is the highest mountain of the Zabarwan Range and is visible from most parts of the city of Srinagar. The mountain is considered sacred by Hindus for its association with Shiva, and was the site of a historical annual Kashmiri Hindu pilgrimage. The mountain is located adjacent to the Dachigam National Park. It has a glacier and remains covered with snow for almost half of the year. The Tarsar and Marsar lakes lie on the eastern side of this mountain.

== Etymology ==
The mountain is named after one of the epithets of Hindu deity Shiva (Mahadeva) meaning 'god of gods'. The mountain is called Mahadevagiri ('Mahadeva mountain' in Sanskrit) in the 6th–8th century Hindu text Nilamata Purana and the 12th century chronicle Rajatarangini of Kalhana.

== History ==
Ancient Hindu scriptures and texts refer to mount Mahadev as a sacred site and place of pilgrimage. The 6th–8th century Hindu text Nilamata Purana and the 12th century Sanskrit chronicle Rajatarangini describe the location of the mountain in reference to other places in the Kashmir Valley. The 19th century works Tarikh-i-Hasan by Hassan Khoyihami (in Persian) and The Valley of Kashmir by Walter Roper Lawrence also contain references to the mountain, both describing it as being sacred to Hindus. Tarikh-i-Hassan also mentions that ice from the mountain's glacier was collected and sold in Srinagar, and an annual pilgrimage to the mountain was made by Kashmiri Pandits during sawan purnima.

In 2025, Islamist militants targeted and massacred mainly Hindu tourists in a terrorist attack in Pahalgam, following which three of the perpetrators were killed in an army operation in the area surrounding mount Mahadev. This army operation was named 'Operation Mahadev' after the mountain.

== Religious significance ==
Mount Mahadev is considered sacred by Hindus. According to Kashmiri Hindu folklore, the mountain is believed to be one of the spots where Shiva shed his attachments on the way to Amarnath. Kashmiri Hindus consider the mountain an abode of Shiva.

=== Pilgrimage ===
Hundreds of Kashmiri Pandits historically made pilgrimage to Mount Mahadev annually on the purnima of the month of shravan. Pilgrims would collect snow from the mountain as prasad. The annual pilgrimage ceased after the 1990 displacement of Kashmiri Hindus from the Kashmir Valley due to threats and violence of the insurgency in the region.

== Route ==
It can be climbed through Faqir Gujri, near Scholars' School, Dara Theed Harwan. The trek can be both a day trek as well as a night trek with a night stay at Ledwas. The trek has moderate difficulty. One has to cross several small streams on way to Ledwas, which is always enjoyable. Nomads can be seen grazing the cattle with their horses carrying essentials.

== See also ==
- New Theed
- Dachigam National Park
