= Zabarwan Range =

Mountain range in India

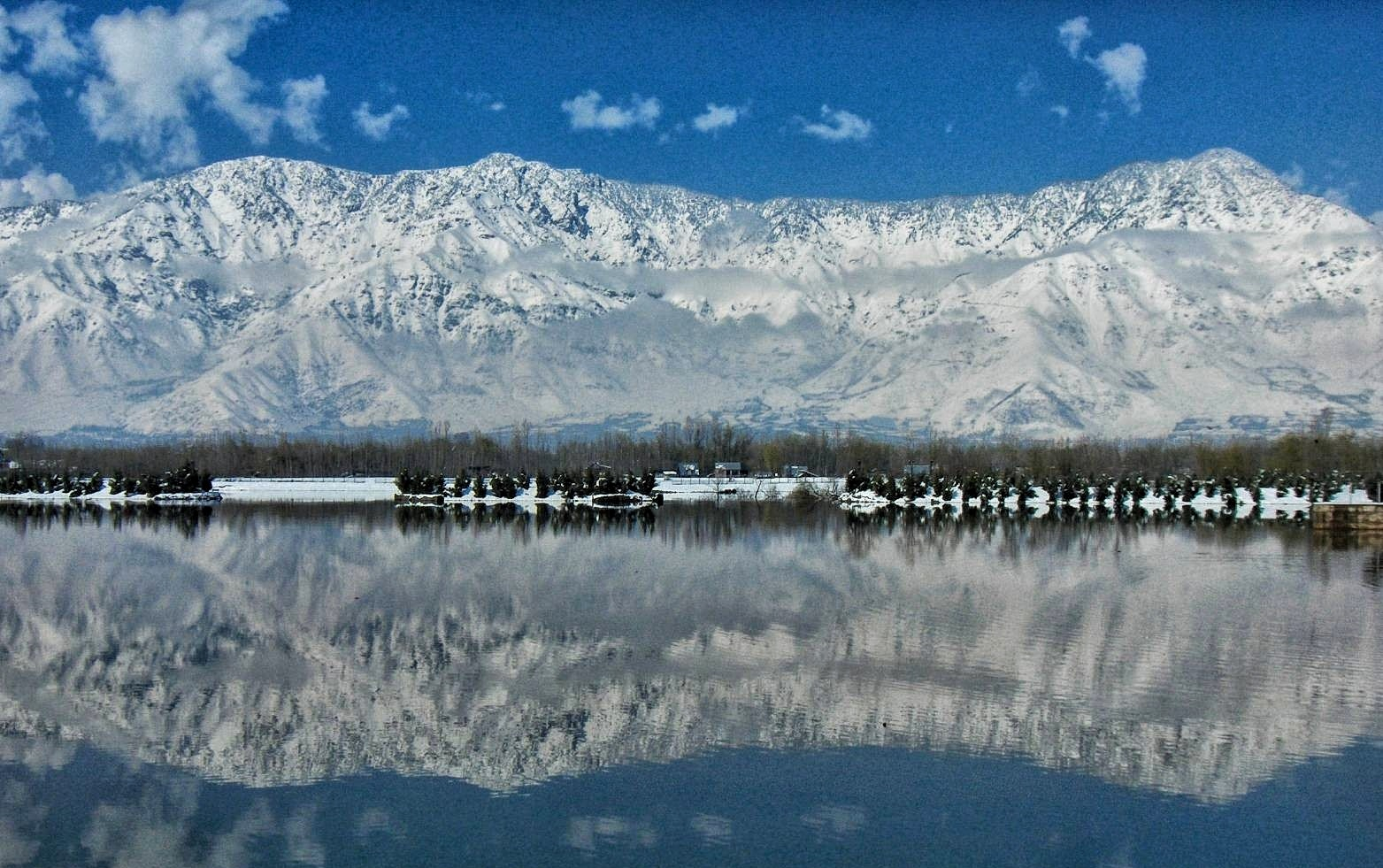
- Reflection of snow covered Zabarwan mountains in the Dal Lake

Highest point
- Peak: Mount Mahadev
- Elevation: 3,966 m (13,012 ft)
- Coordinates: 34°09′09″N 74°59′14″E

Dimensions
- Length: 20 mi (32 km) N-W
- Width: 8 mi (13 km)

Geography
- Country: India
- State: Jammu and Kashmir
- Region: Kashmir Valley
- Districts: Srinagar, Pulwama and Ganderbal
- Settlement: Srinagar
- Range coordinates: 34°08′27″N 74°58′08″E

The Zabarwan Range is a short (20 mi (32 km) long) sub-mountain range branching from the Great Himalayan Range in the central part of the Kashmir Valley in the Union Territory of Jammu and Kashmir in India. Mount Mahadev, overlooking the city of Srinagar, is the range's highest peak with an elevation of 3,966 m (13,012 ft).

== Geography ==
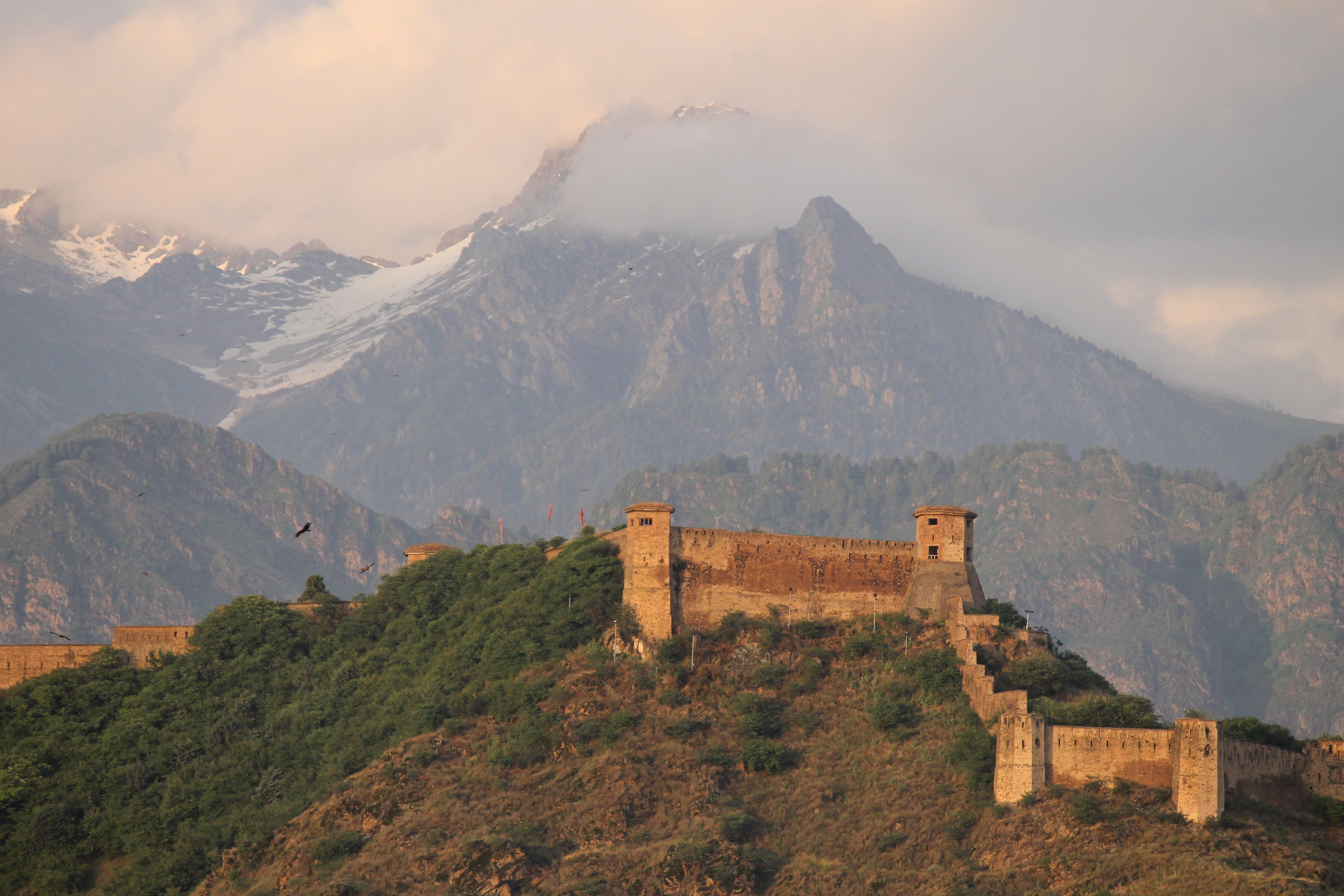
Snow-capped Mount Mahadev (3,966 m (13,012 ft)), the highest peak of the Zabarwan range, towering behind the Hari Parbat Fort in the foreground

The Zabarwan Range borders the central part of the Kashmir Valley in the east. Literally it is the mountain range between Sind Valley and Lidder Valley on the north and south, and between the Zanskar Range and Jhelum Valley on the east and west, respectively. Specifically the range is known to be what overlooks the Dal Lake and holds the Mughal gardens of Srinagar. The north end of the range lies in Ganderbal, while the south end lies in Pampore. The Shankaracharya Temple is built on the edge of the central part of the Zabarwan Range. The highest peak of this range is Mahadev Peak at 13,013 feet (3,966 m), which forms the distant background of the eastern mountain wall.

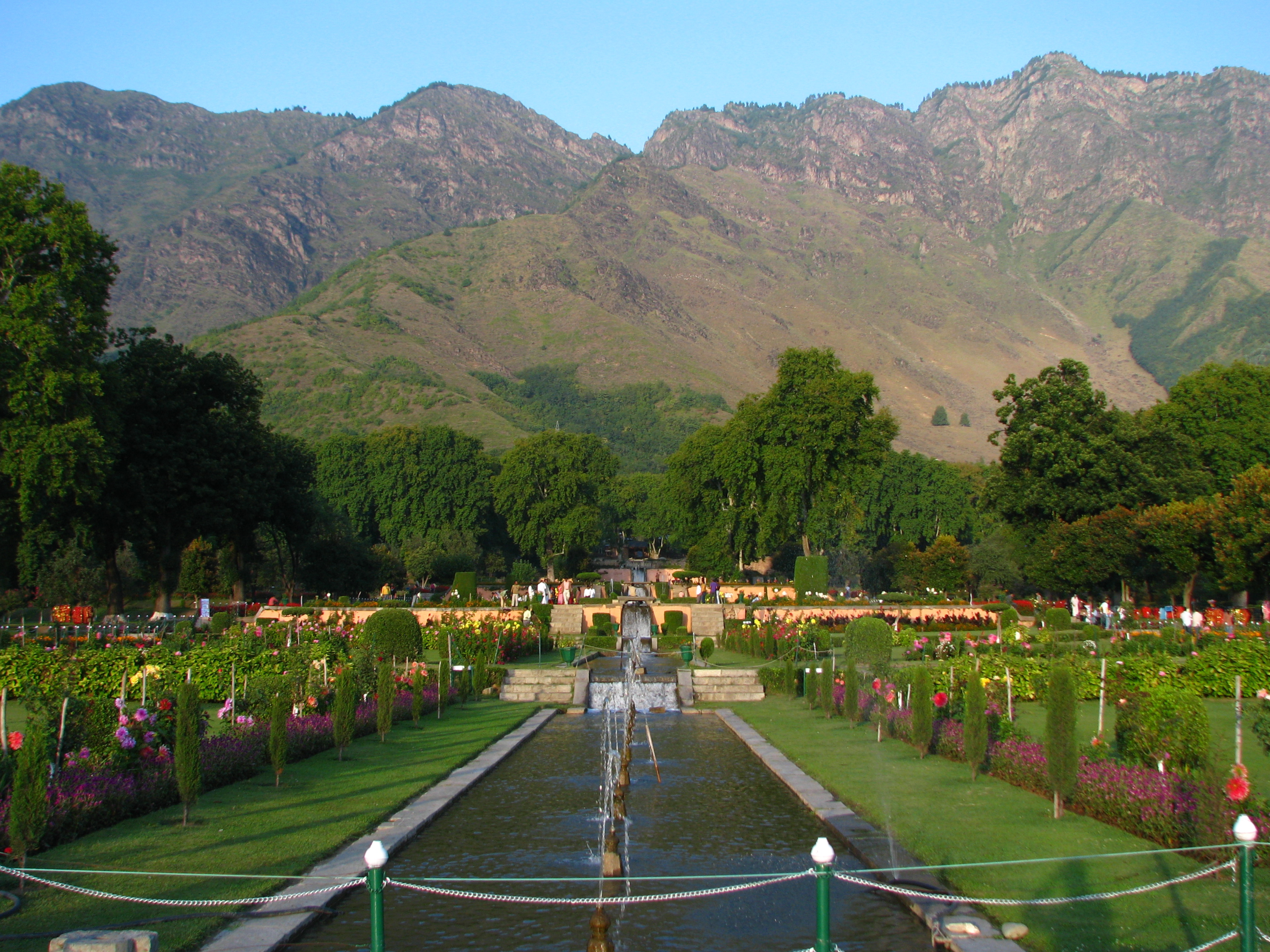
Nishat Bagh in the lap of the Zabarwans

On the northern slopes of the central part of the range there are three Mughal gardens built by Emperor Shah Jahan. These include Chashma Shahi, Nishat Bagh and Shalimar Garden alongside the Pari Mahal (the fairy palace). The recently built Indira Gandhi Memorial Tulip Garden in the lap of the Zabarwans is considered the largest tulip garden of Asia spread over 12 hectares of land.

== Wildlife ==
The Zabarwan mountain range possesses great Himalayan features with rich wildlife. The Dachigam National Park, spread over 141 km^{2}, is the main feature of the range. The Dachigam National Park holds the last viable population of Kashmir stag (Hangul) and the largest population of black bear in Asia. The range is also home to musk deer, leopard, Himalayan brown bear, leopard cat, jungle cat, red fox, jackal, Himalayan wolf, serow, Himalayan yellow-throated marten, long-tailed marmot, Indian porcupine, Himalayan mouse-hare, langur and Himalayan weasel.

== Climate ==
The climate of the Zabarwans can be summed up from the climate of Dachigam. It is a sub-Mediterranean type, with two spells of dryness from April to June and September to November. The range has irregular weather conditions with a considerable variation in the amount of precipitation. Snow is the main source of precipitation, and in some parts melts till June. The annual minimum and maximum rainfall of the Zabarwans ranges between 32 mm to 546 mm.

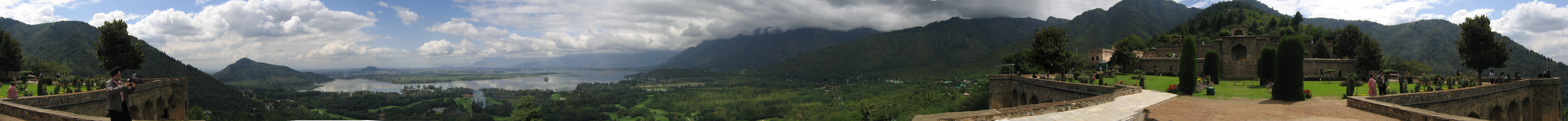
Panorama of the Zabarwans

== Geology ==
The crystalline axis of the Himalayan system contains the oldest rocks, and in the northern flank of this crystalline axis are found fossiliferous sediments of marine origin. The Zabarwan Range has crystalline rocks such as granite, schists and phyllites with embedded limestone, which form the core of its parent range. The western region from Khanmoh to the east of Mahadev consists of shale, calcareous slates and blue limestone. The sediments composing this range have been laid from Cambrian to Tertiary. The soil depth in Dachigam on the slope from lower to middle reaches is less than 25 cm, and hence falls under the category of very shallow soils.
