= Indira Gandhi Memorial Tulip Garden =

Garden in Srinagar, India

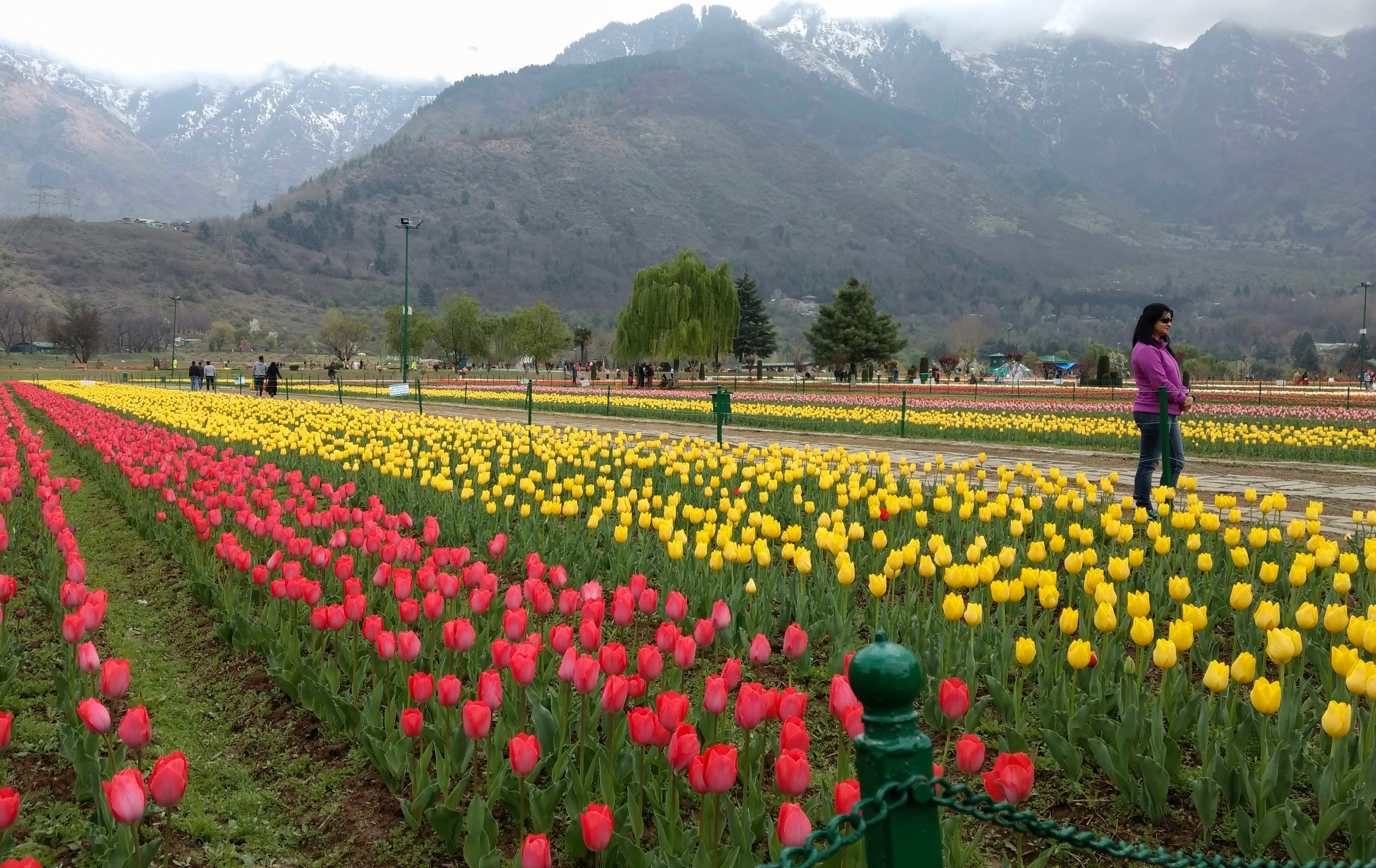
- Interactive map of Indira Gandhi Memorial Tulip Garden
- Type: Garden
- Location: Srinagar, J&K, India
- Coordinates: 34.096056°N 74.88003°E
- Area: 30 ha (74 acres)
- Opened: 2007
- Owner: Government of Jammu and Kashmir
- Operator: Department of Flori-culture
- Visitors: 430,000 (2024)
- Status: Open
- Plants: 1.75 million
- Species: 7- 75
- Collections: Tulips

Indira Gandhi Memorial Tulip garden, previously Model Floriculture Center, is a tulip garden in Srinagar, in the Indian union territory of Jammu and Kashmir. It is the largest tulip garden in Asia spread over an area of about 30 ha (74 acres). It is situated at the base of the Zabarwan range, built on a sloping ground in a terraced fashion consisting of seven terraces with an overview of the Dal Lake. The tulip garden is home to around 70 - 75 varieties of tulips. Besides tulips, there are 46 varieties of flowers, including hyacinths, daffodils and ranunculus which were also brought from Holland.

== History ==
The garden was opened in 2007 with the aim to boost floriculture and tourism in the Kashmir Valley. It was formerly known as Siraj Bagh. About 1.75 million tulip bulbs, all in multiple colours, were brought from Keukenhof tulip gardens of Amsterdam.

== Tulip festival ==
The Tulip festival is an annual Spring festival to increase tourism by the Government of Jammu and Kashmir. The festival showcases a variety of flowers in the garden.

In 2023, the garden received a record number of visitors. Over a span of one month, between March and April 2023, the garden was visited by 365,000 tourists, including 3,000 foreign tourists.

== Gallery ==
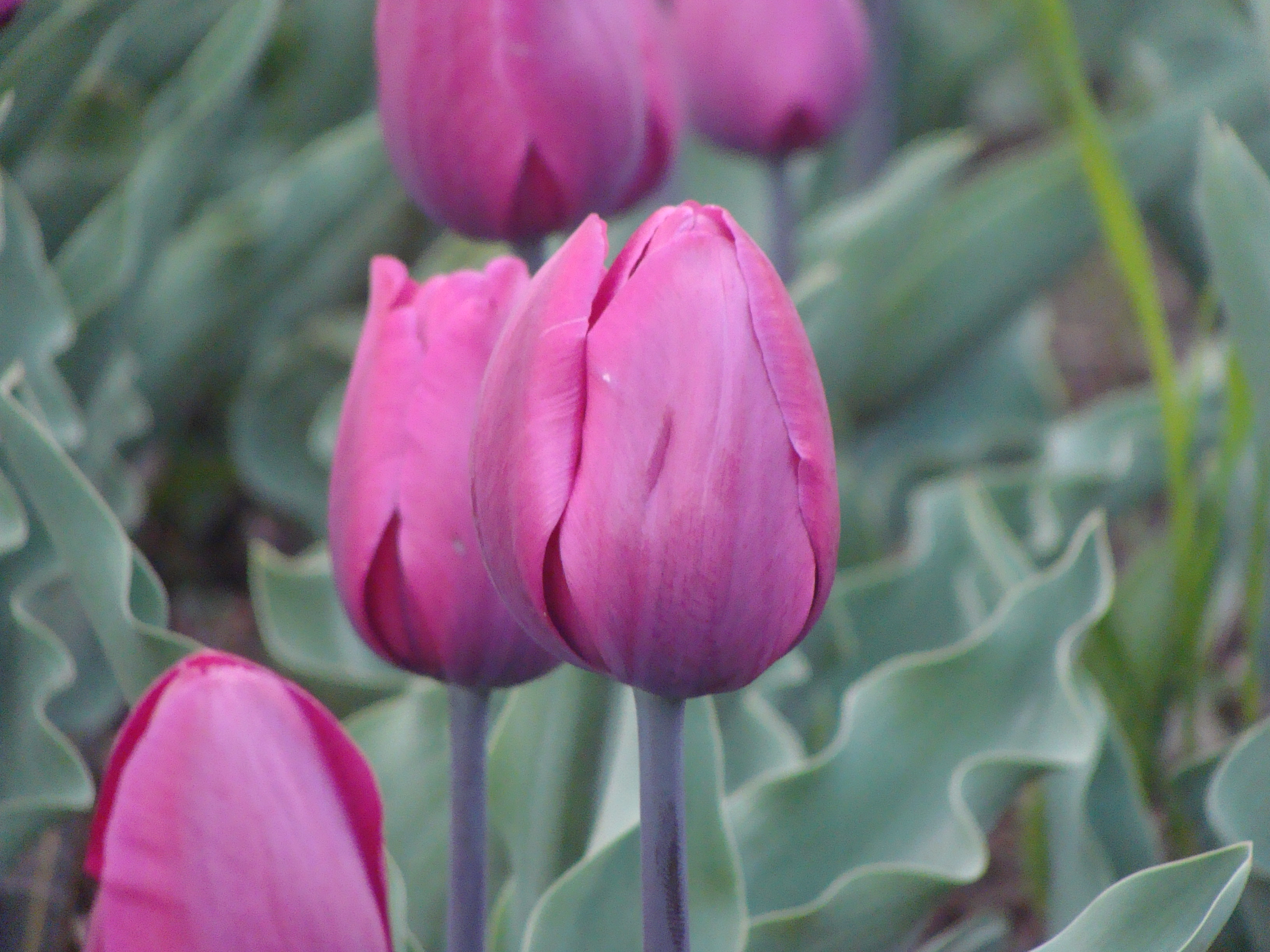

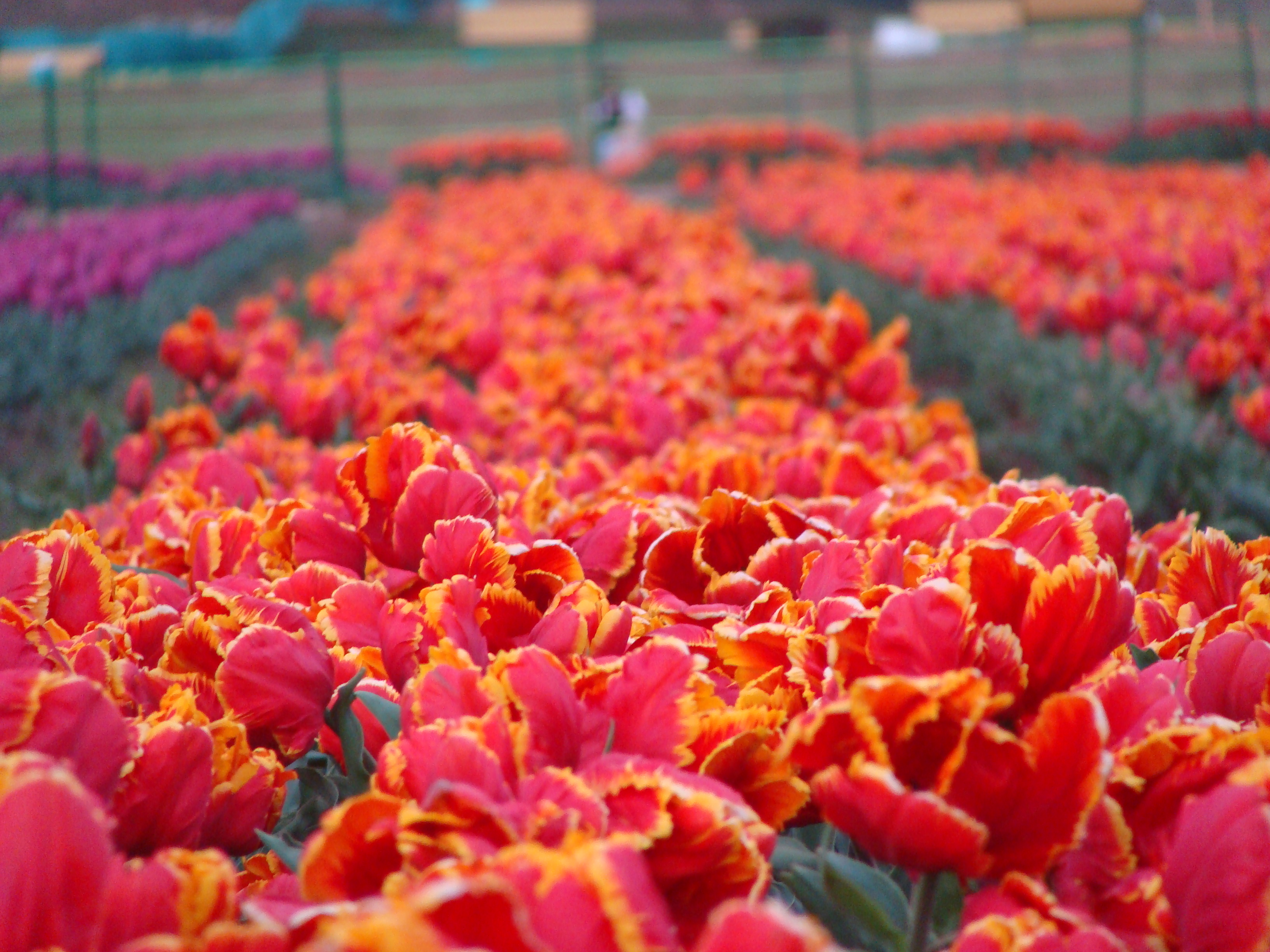

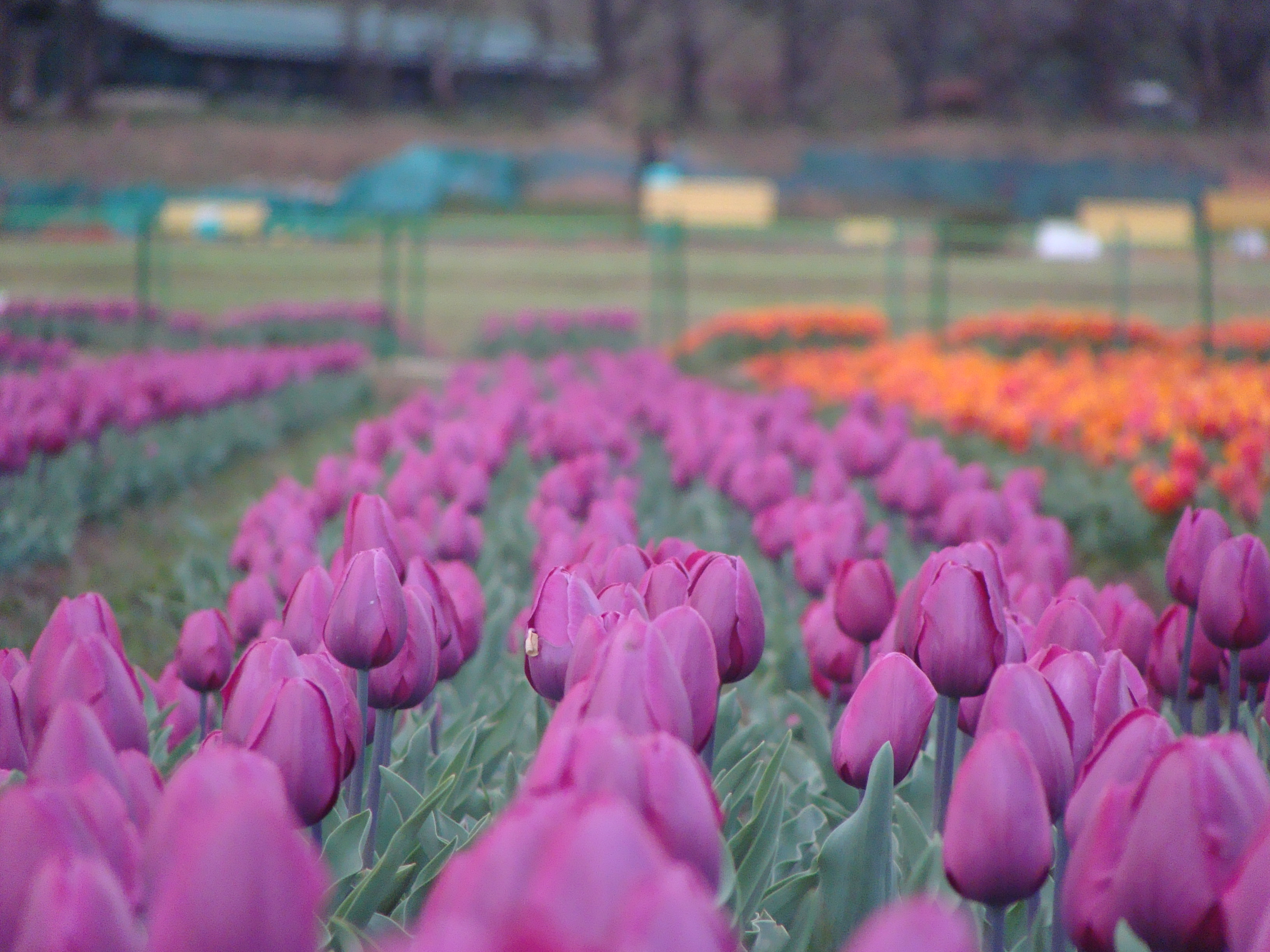

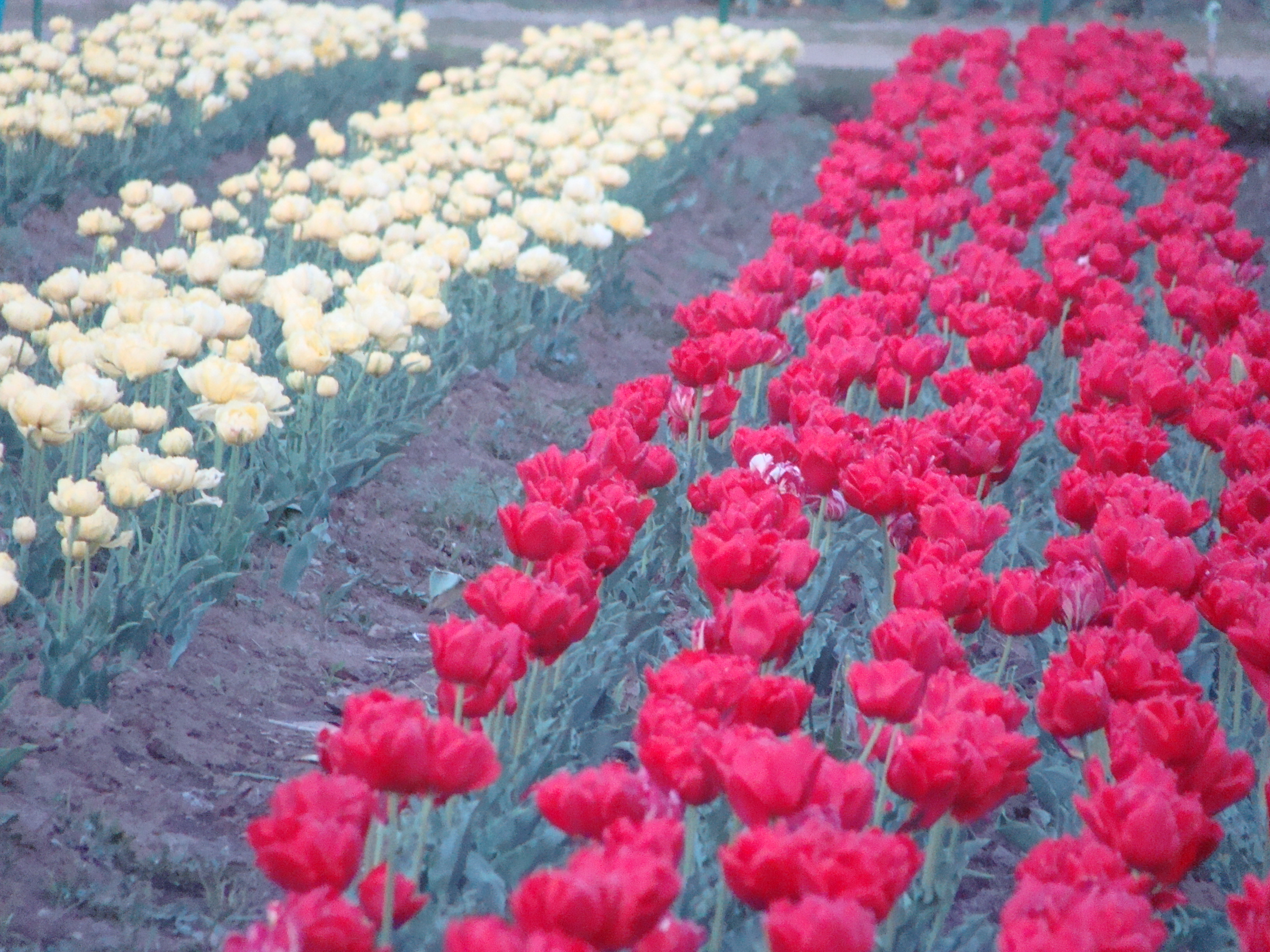

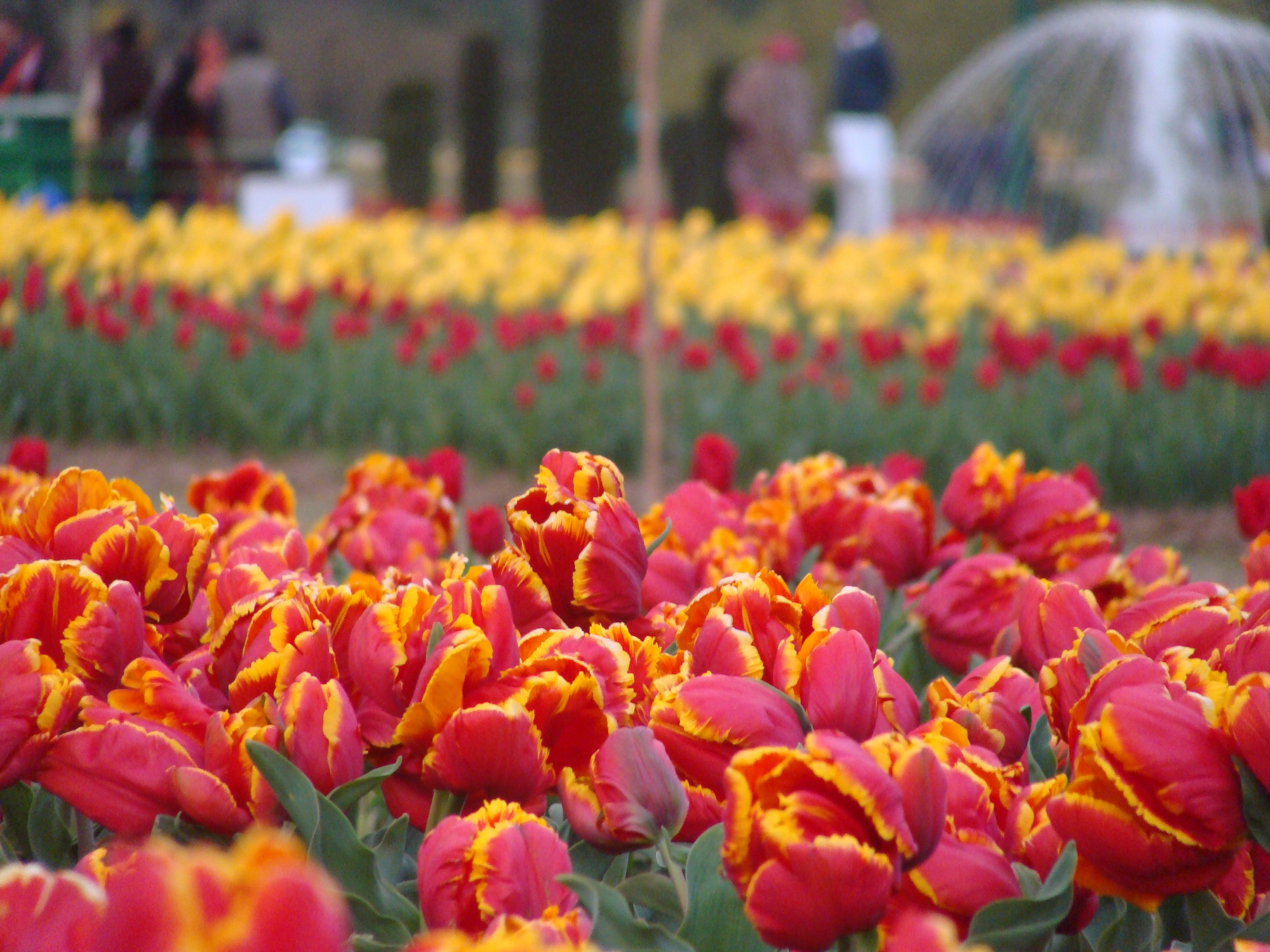

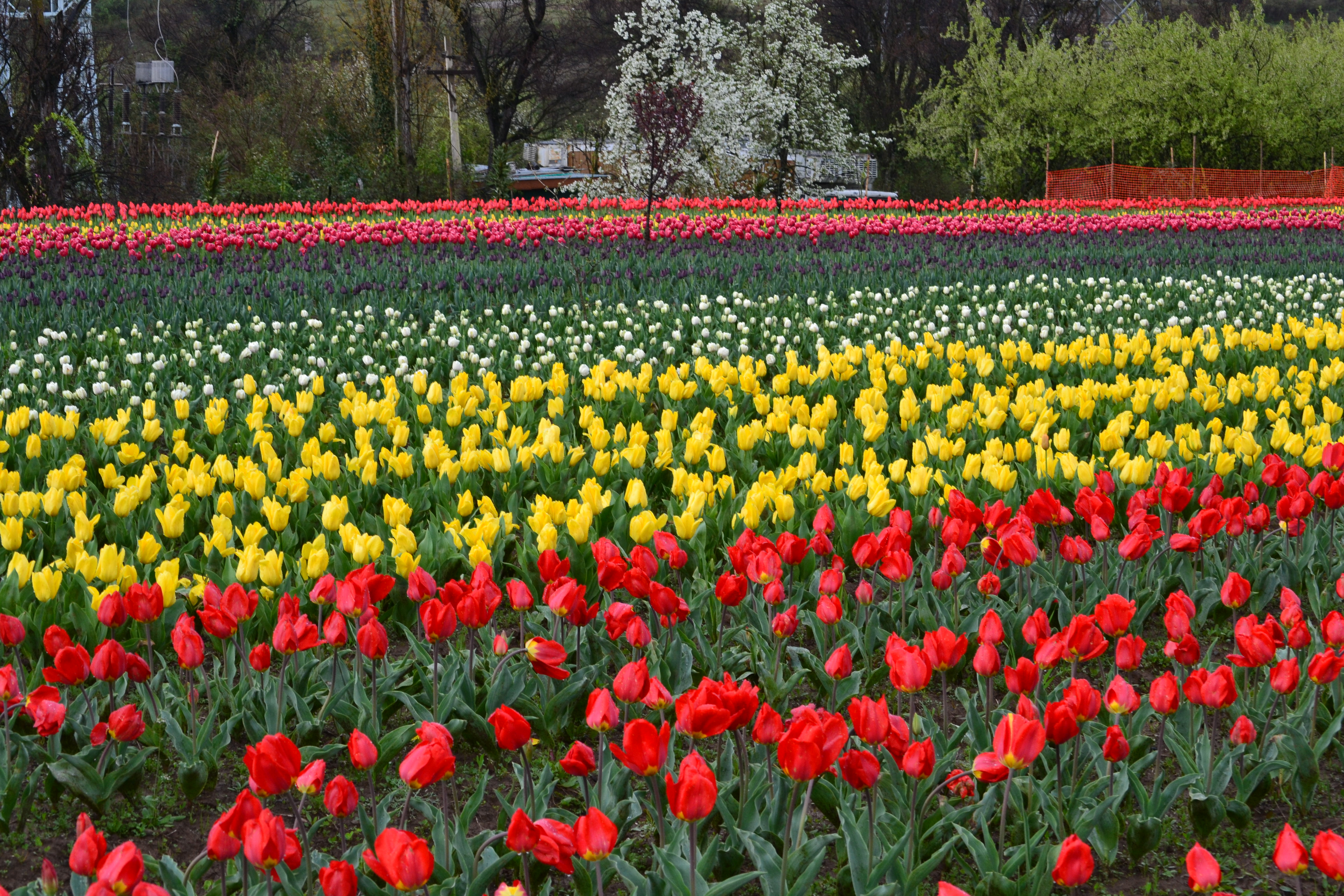
