= Fazl Ali-bey Javanshir =

Azerbaijani statesman

- Born: Before 1693; Safavid Karabakh
- Died: c. 1738 (aged 47–48); Probably Khorasan, Afshar Iran
- Relatives: Javanshir clan
- Military career
- Allegiance: Afshar Iran
- Branch: Cavalry
- Rank: Bey

Fazl Ali-bey Javanshir (before 1693 in Safavid Karabakh – 1738 in Afsharid Empire) was a member of the Karabakh Javanshir tribe, the elder brother of Panahali Khan Javanshir. He worked as viceroy (naib) and master of ceremonies of Nadir Shah Afshar.

== Ancestry ==
He was from the Sarijali branch of the clan of Javanshir, who with their associate clan of Otuz-Iki (meaning thirty-two in Turkic) had for long been rivals of the Yirmi-Dört (meaning twenty-four in Turkic) and Ziyadoghlu Qajars of Ganja, whose chiefs had been official rulers of Karabakh since Safavid times. His father's name was Ibrahim Agha Javanshir but information on his further ancestry is quite complicated.

According to Mirza Adigozal bey, Fazl Ali's paternal great-grandfather Panah Ali bey served at the headquarters of the governors (beglarbegs) of the Karabakh-Ganja province in the early 17th century, at the time when the region was directly controlled by the Safavid Empire of Iran. He soon retired, married a woman from the Javanshir clan of Karabakh and had a son by the name of Ali (nicknamed Sarija Ali). They lived in their estate located in Arasbar (Arasbaran) but also owned land in Tartar and the northern shores of the Aras River. The Arasbar estate was rebuilt into a castle during Sarija Ali's son Ibrahim Khalil's lifetime and has been known as Ibrahim Khalil Galasi since.

However, the aforementioned information is contested by different sources, namely Mir Mehdi Khazani who names Panah Ali khan's grandfather Ibrahim Sultan (head of tribe c. 1672) and great-grandfather Budagh Sultan (head of tribe c. 1628) in his "Kitab-e tarikh-e Qarabagh" (The Book of the History of Karabakh). Azerbaijani historian E. B. Shukurzade proposes Panah Ali Agha (I) as his grandfather and Ibrahim Khalil Agha (I) as his great-grandfather. However, in all versions his father is the same. Fazl Ali had two younger brothers - Panah Ali bey and Behbud Ali bey.

== Life ==
After the dethronement of the Safavids in 1736 by Nader Shah, the landed classes of Ganja and Karabakh (including the Javanshirs) gathered in Mughan and decided to oppose the new shah and agreed to try to restore the Safavids to the throne. When this news reached Nader Shah, he ordered all Muslim landowners of the region and their families to be deported to Khorasan (northeastern Iran) as punishment. Fazl Ali and Panah Ali were among the deportees.

However, Fazl Ali managed to rise through the ranks finally landing as Nader's master of ceremonies. After Fazlali Bey was killed c. 1738 because he openly protested to Nadir Shah regarding the exile of the Karabakh lands, his position was entrusted to his younger brother Panahali Bey. According to Mirza Adigozal bey, Nadir Shah wanted to replace murdered Fazl Ali-bey Javanshir with his younger brother Panahali khan, "handed him the staff, clad him in the clothes of an master of ceremonies, and conferred on him the rights of his dead elder brother;" while Panah Ali bey found it humiliated to "carry the staff, bow to Nadir Shah, and talk to his yasauls."

Because his brother Fazl Ali bey was killed by Nader Shah, so he went off to plunder wealth with his tribesmen and went into hiding.

== See also ==
- Ibrahim Khalil Khan
- Javanshir Qizilbash
- Qizilbashi
- Amir Khan Yaghlevandli-Javanshir

== Sources ==
- Axundov, Nazim; Fərzəliyev, Akif (2006). Qarabağnamələr. Baku: Şərq-Qərb. ISBN 9952-34-070-2.
- Tahirzadə, Ədalət (2005). Nadir şah Əfşar. (Tərcümeyi-hal oçerki) (PDF) (in Azerbaijani). Baku: Çıraq.
