= Amir Khan Yaghlevandli-Javanshir =

Qizilbash military and political figure

- Born: 1732; Safavid Karabakh
- Died: 1775 (aged 42–43); Durrani Empire
- Relatives: Javanshir clan
- Military career
- Allegiance: Durrani Empire
- Branch: Cavalry
- Rank: Khan

Amir Khan Yaghlevandli-Javanshir (b. Yaghlevandli oymagh, Safavid Karabakh - d. Kashmir, Durrani Empire ) was a Qizilbash military and political figure, general, belonging to the same family as the Karabakh khans.

== Life ==
Amir Khan was born around 1732 in a Javanshir clan in Yaghlevandli oymagh of Karabagh. His father, Safi Khan, came from the Yaghlevandli or Yaghlavend oymagh of the Turkic Javanshir clan of Afshar tribe. In 1756, he was taken into the service of the Afghan Ahmad Shah Durrani. He made several campaigns with the Shah in Kashmir in 1756, Sirhind and Sind in 1757, Balochistan in 1750, Sistan in 1754, Khorasan in 1754 and Balkh in 1752. In 1770, Amir Khan Jevanshir was appointed governor of Kashmir by order of Ahmad Shah Dürrani. Amir Khan Jevanshir built a number of attractions in Kashmir, for example, the Sher Garhi Palace and Amira Kadal bridge. Persecuted Kashmiri Pandits. According to Ser Walter Roper Lawrence was possibly the best of the Afghan rulers:

Amir Khan Jawan Sher was perhaps the best of Pathan rulers, for at least he built the Amiran Kadal, the bridge which stands at the entrance of Srinagar, and constructed the palace of the Shergarhi, but. on the other hand, he showed petty spite in destroying the Mughal gardens on the Dal. The other Pathan rulers are now only remembered for their brutality and cruelty.

Amir Khan Jevanshir died in 1775 in Kashmir.

== See also ==
- Javanshir clan
- Javanshir Qizilbash
- Qizilbashi

== Sources ==
- Ishaq Khan, Mohammad (2009). Perspectives on Kashmir: Historical Dimensions.
- Bakshi, S.R. (2001). Kashmir Through Ages.
- Chingizoglu, Anvar (2016). Yaghlavendlis. Baku: Mutarcim.
