= Sher Garhi Palace =

Palace of the Maharadjas of Jammu and Kashmir in Srinagar, India

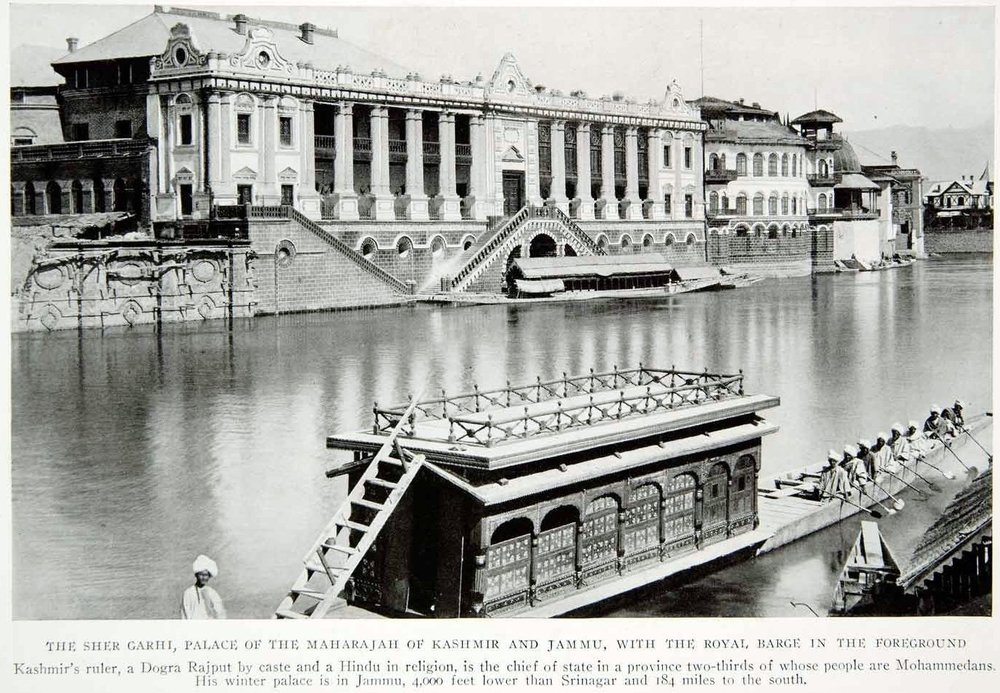
The Sher Garhi Palace in its heyday

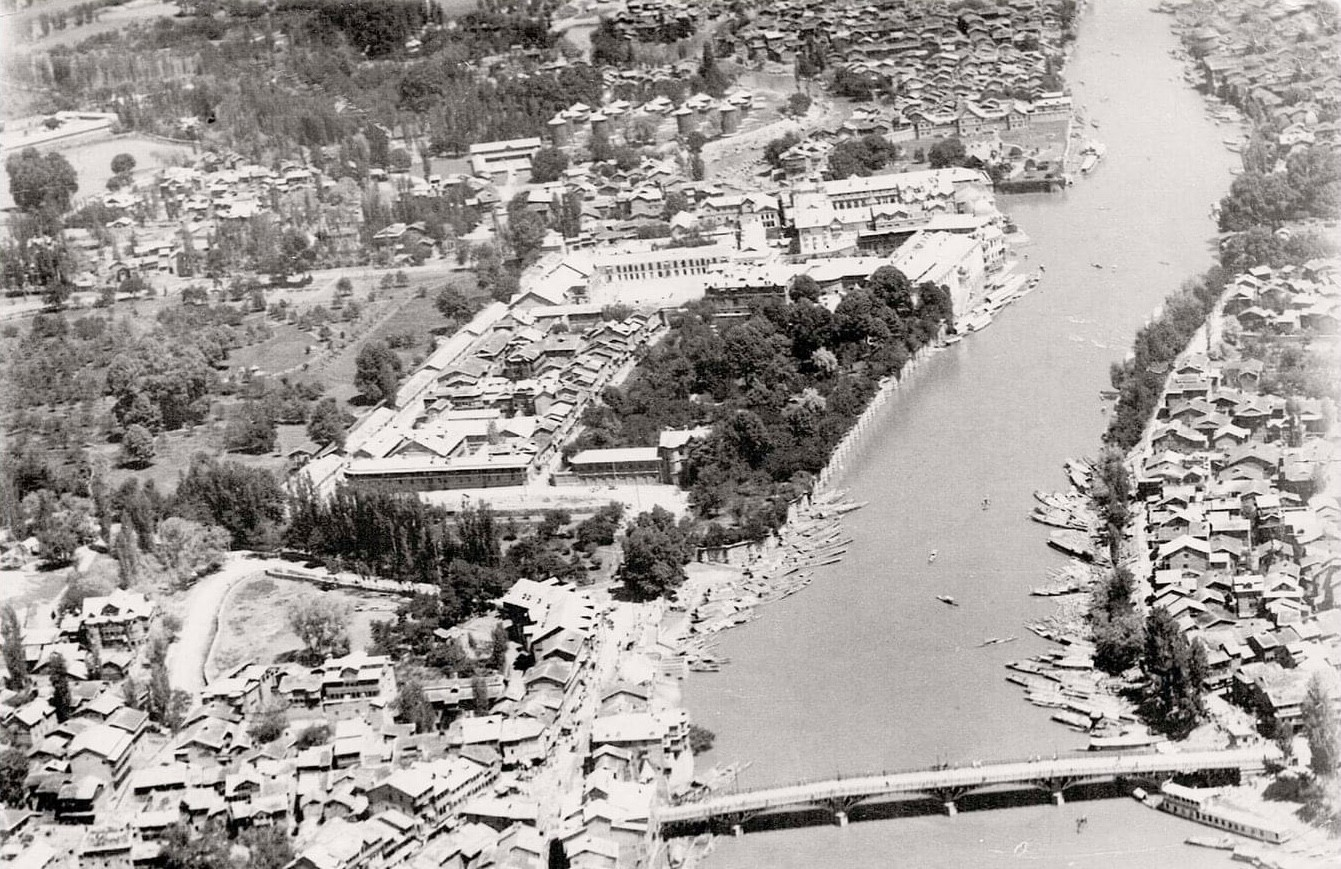
Sher Garhi Palace seen from the air (1925) with the first or Amira Kadal bridge in front. On the left is the Sarai Payeen and the Maharaja bazaar.

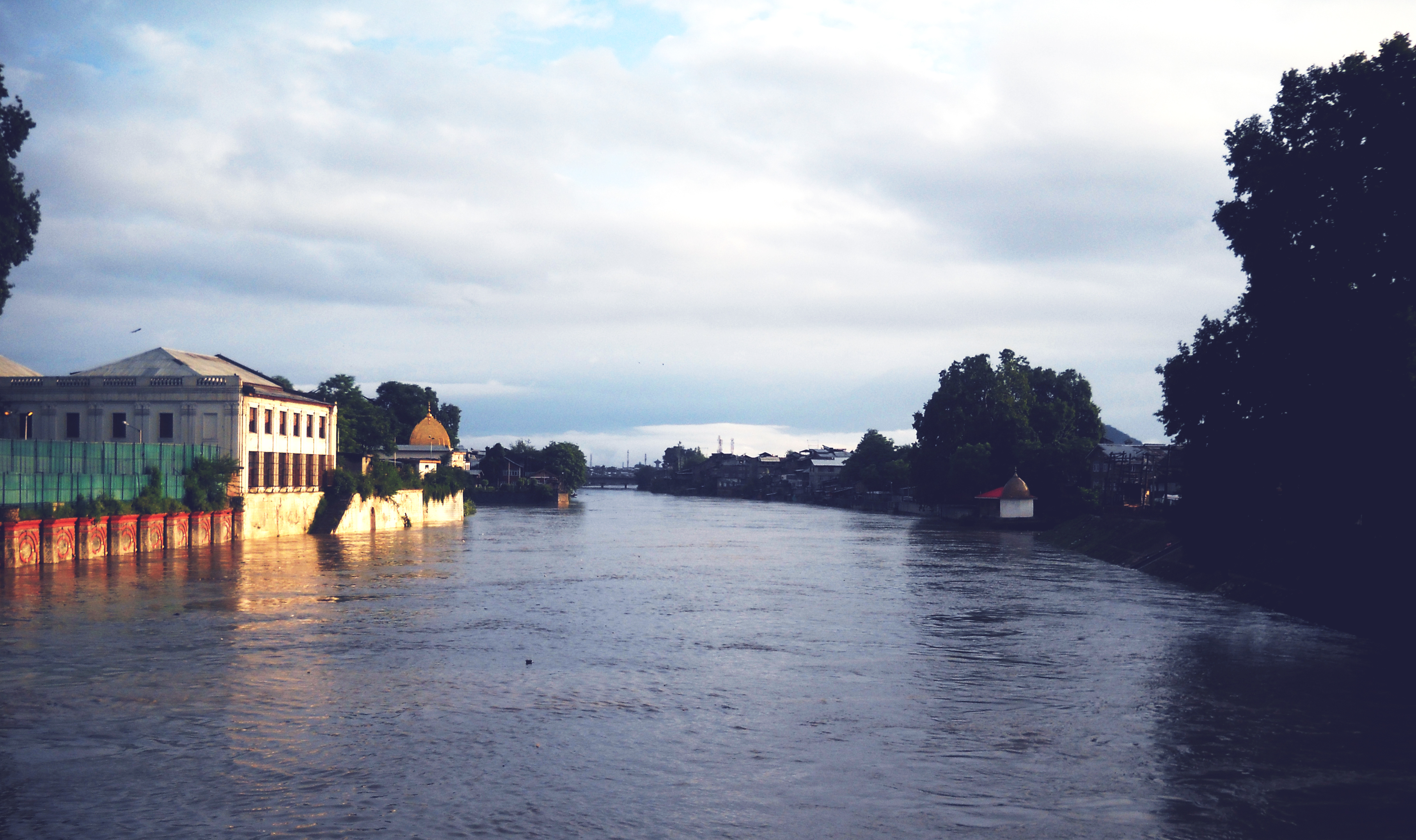
The Sher Garhi Palace along the Jhelum River (2016)

The Sher Garhi Palace is a former royal residence in Srinagar, Jammu and Kashmir, India. It sits south of the Old City, on the banks of the Jhelum River. Its name means Tiger Fortress. The complex is also known as the Old Secretariat, from its later use as a government building.

The palace was built in 1772. The Afghan governor Jawansher Khan constructed it. For decades it served as the seat of Afghan governors. After the 1819 Battle of Shopian, Sikh governors took control and continued to use it. Later it became home to the Dogra Maharajas of Jammu and Kashmir. The Dogra rulers expanded the palace throughout the 19th century. Around 1900, they rebuilt its Jhelum-facing riverfront. That rebuild used a neoclassical style, with Corinthian columns. It blended English and Kashmiri architectural elements.

Fires caused extensive damage to the palace. This happened in the 1970s and again in the early 2000s. Restoration work began in 2015. Part of the complex now houses an art museum gallery. That gallery opened in 2020. Another wing along the river serves as the Srinagar City Museum.

== Name ==
The name Sher Garhi combines the Persian/Urdu sher (lion) with garhi (small fort or fortified residence), a common suffix in North Indian place names. Despite this literal meaning, English-language sources on the palace consistently render the name as Tiger fortress rather than Lion fortress.

Over time, the complex has been known by several other names, reflecting its changing administrative role: as the Old Secretariat, from its use as the seat of government departments, and as the Old Assembly, from the years it housed the state legislative council.

== History ==
=== Duranni empire ===
In the second half of the 18th century, Kashmir was part of the Durrani Empire, also known as the Afghan Empire. Its first ruler, Ahmad Shah Durrani appointed Amir Khan Sher Jawan (also recorded as Jawansher Khan) as governor of Kashmir. In 1772, the governor started with the construction of a palace and fortress in Srinagar, the tiger fortress. For the site, he chose the former location of a royal palace built by the Lohara king Ananta, who reigned over Kashmir from roughly 1028 to his forced abdication in 1063. Stones for the new construction are said to have come from the Pathar Masjid, a Mughal-era stone mosque in the old city of Srinagar. For the construction work, the help was enlisted of the Hanjis, the local boatmen community. Next to the palace, the governor also constructed the Amira Kadal bridge (1774–1777) and the Amirabad Garden by Dal Lake. But he is also remembered for demolishing the Mughal gardens around Dal Lake.

After nearly five centuries of Muslim rule, Kashmir fell to the Sikh forces of Ranjit Singh following the Battle of Shopian in 1819. The Sikh governors who followed continued to use the Sher Garhi Palace.

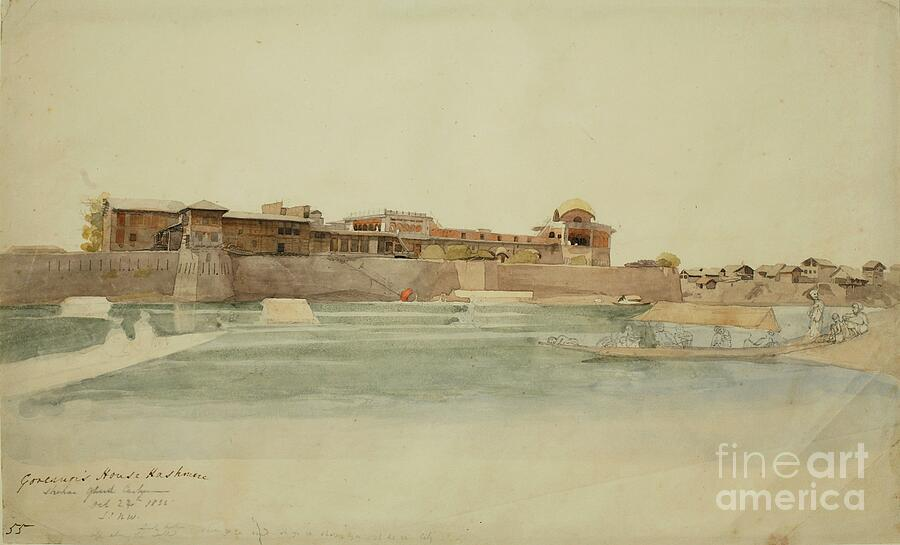
Sher Garhi Palace by Godfrey Vigne (1835)

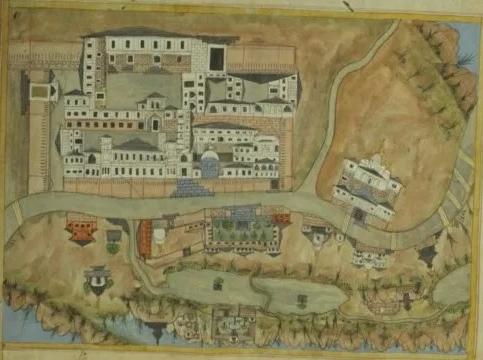
19th century map of Srinagar by Sahib Ram showing the Jhelum river with seven bridges and the Sher Garhi Palace

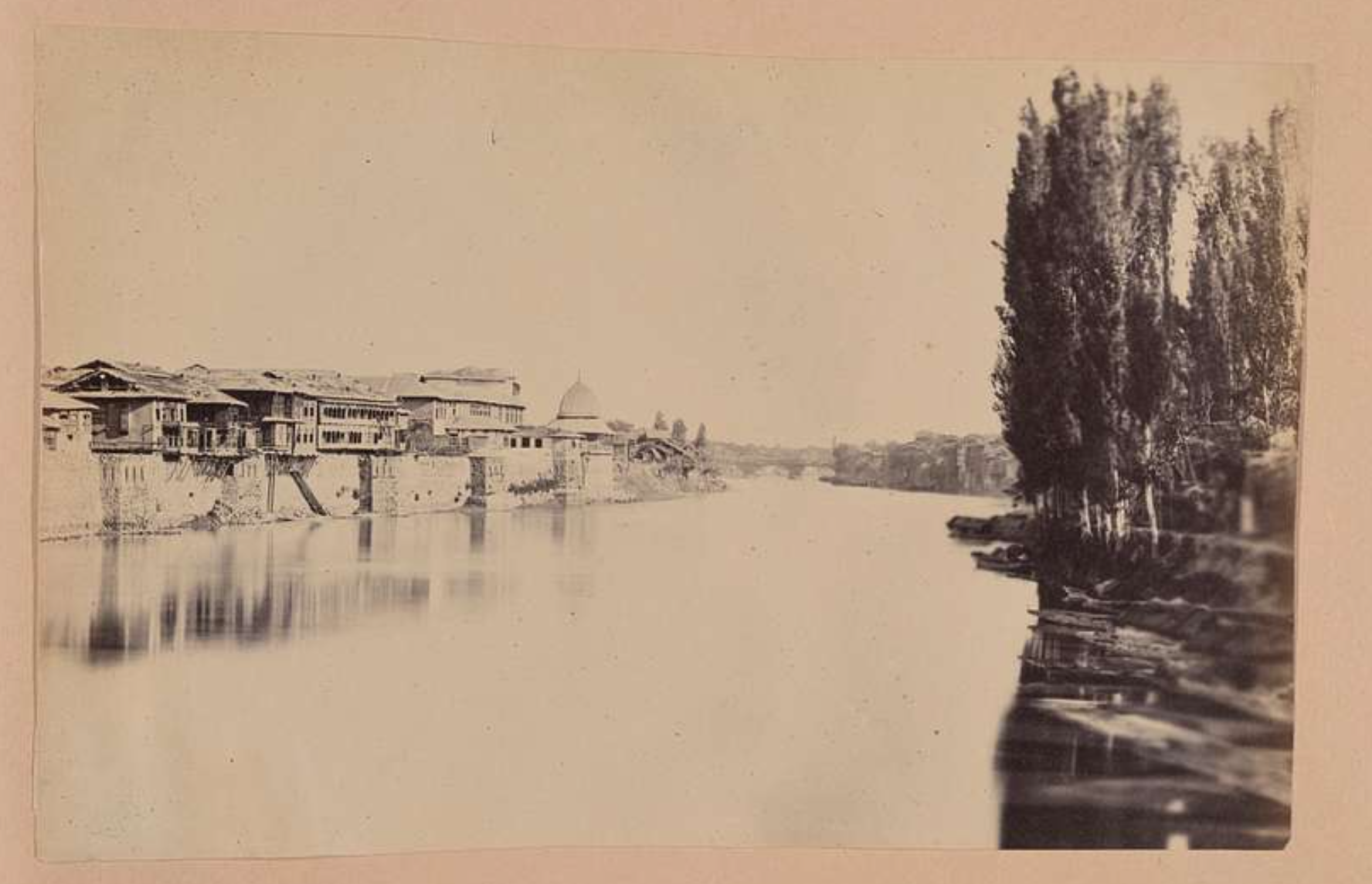
Sher Garhi Palace seen from the first bridge on the Jhelum river (1861)

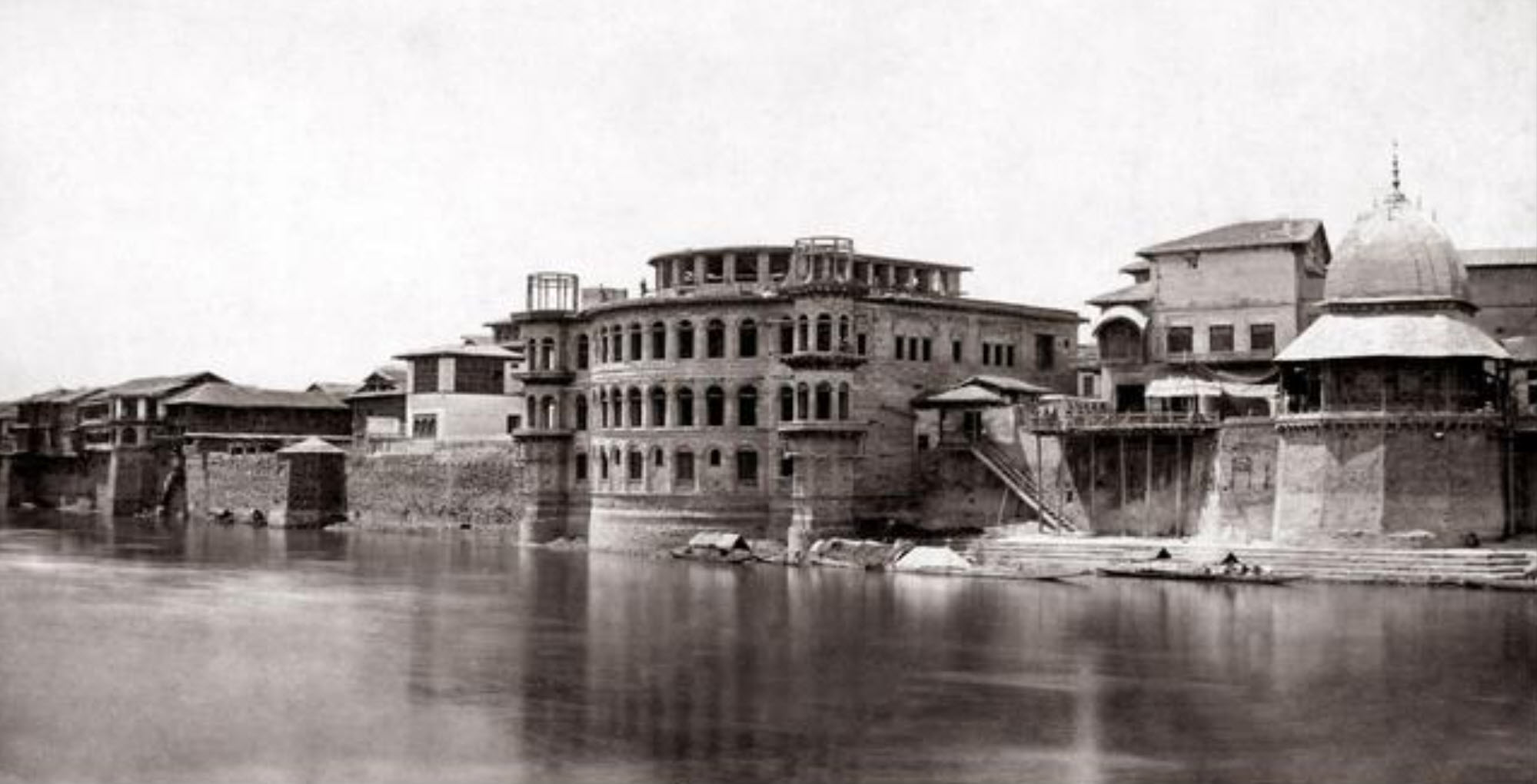
Sher Garhi Palace (1860s)

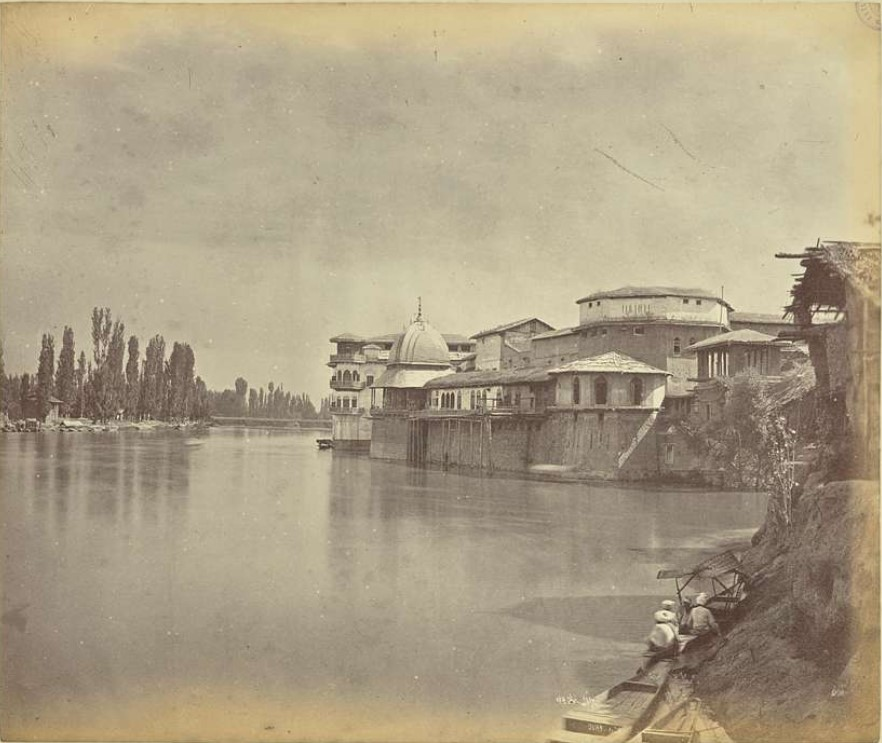
Sher Garhi Palace (1860s)

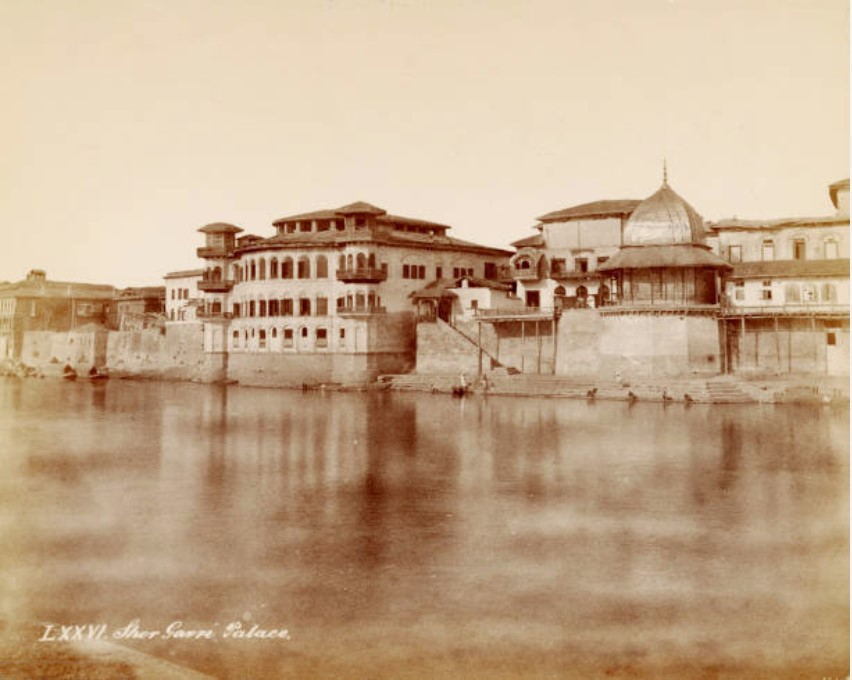
Sher Garhi Palace in 1876

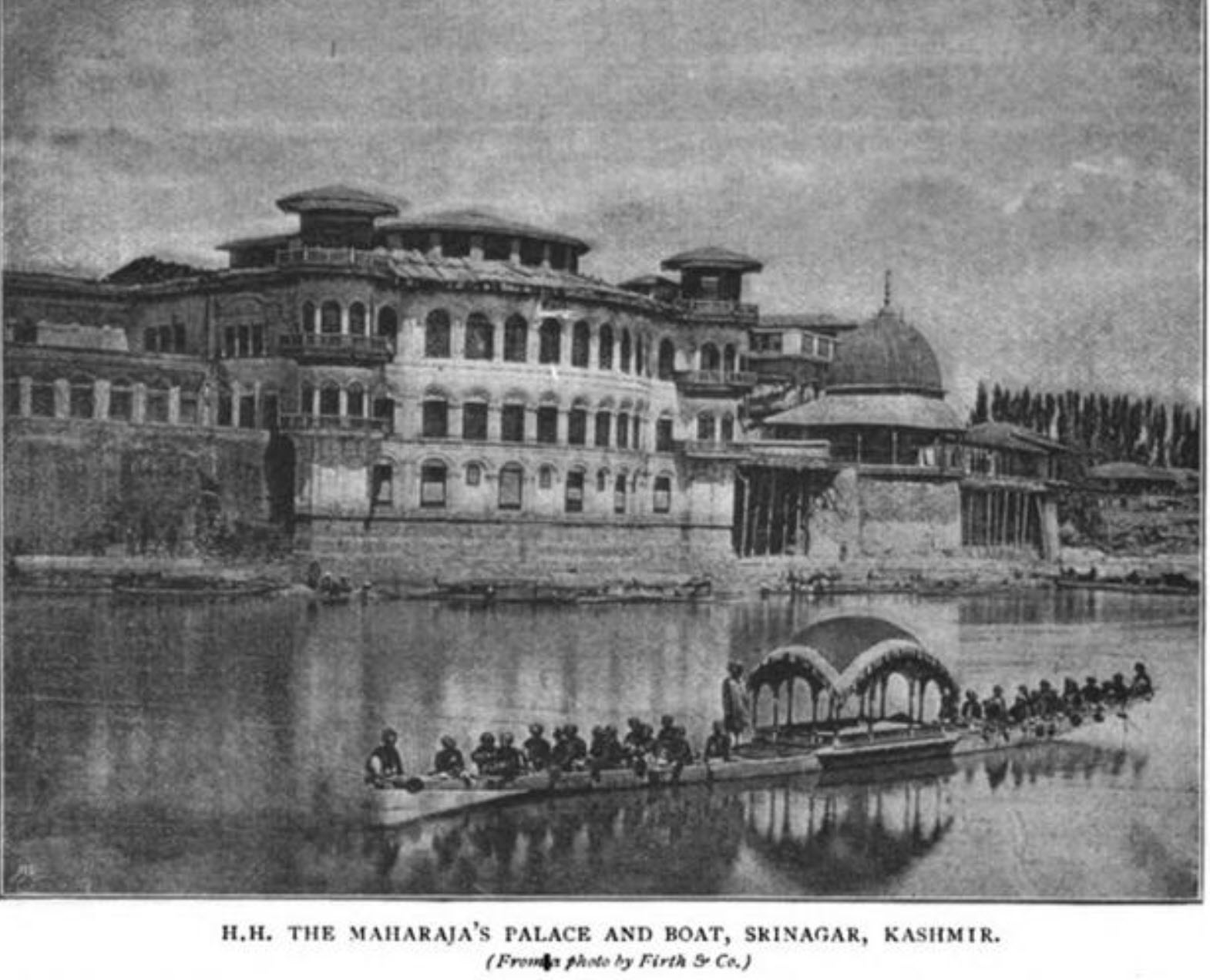
The Maharadja's boat before thee Sher Garhi Palace (1894)

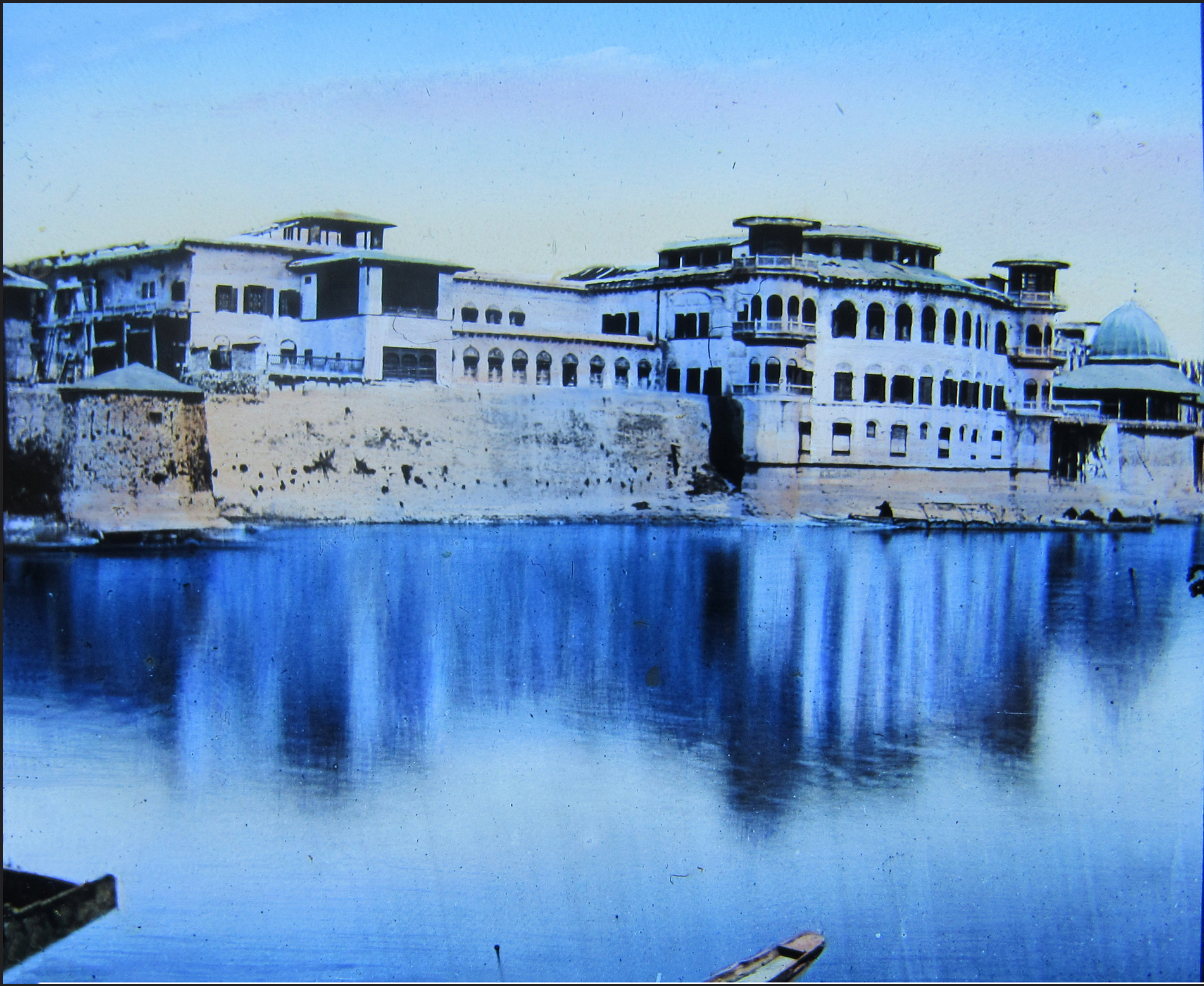
A magic lantern slide depicting the palace

=== Princely State of Kashmir and Jammu (Dogra rule) ===
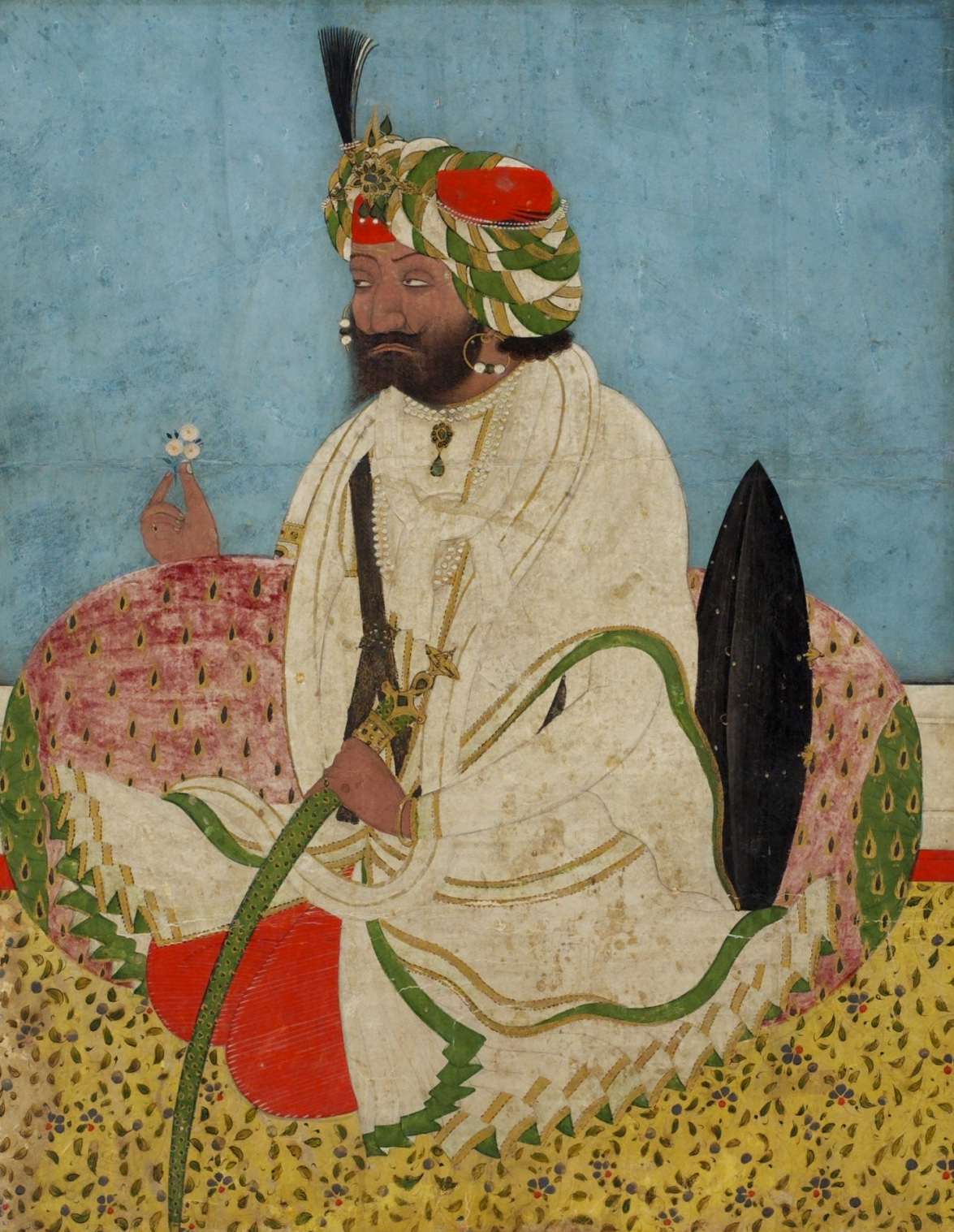
Maharadja Gulab Singh, first Maharadja of the Dogra Dynasty

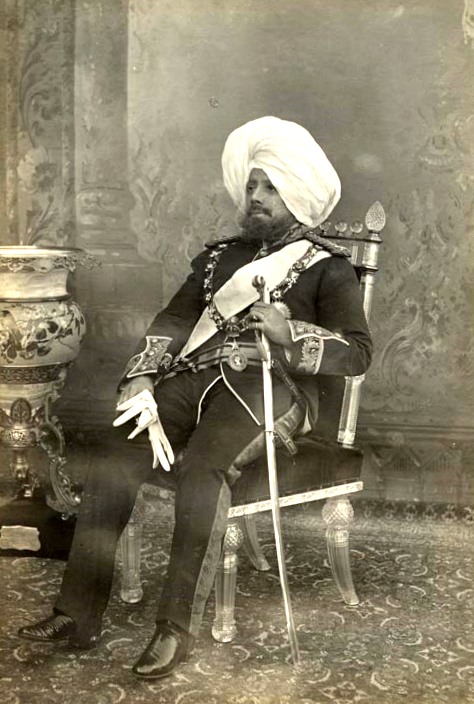
Maharadja Pratap Singh (1848–1925), under who the neoclassical palace facade was constructed

Gulab Singh (1792–1857) founded the Dogra dynasty. He began as a vassal of the Sikh Empire. In 1822, in recognition of his services, he was appointed Raja of Jammu. From the mid-1830s, his general Zorawar Singh extended Gulab Singh's own Jammu dominion into Ladakh and Baltistan. Zorawar Singh's campaigns later earned him the nickname "Napoleon of the East." In 1841, he pushed on into Western Tibet. This campaign failed: Zorawar Singh was defeated and killed at Toyo that December. Next year, in September 1842, in the city of Leh, the Treaty of Chushul was signed restoring the status quo ante bellum, and respecting the "old established frontiers" between Ladakh and Tibet.

When Maharaja Ranjit Singh died in 1839, his empire began to fragment, and the British East India Company grew increasingly influential. This led to the First Anglo-Sikh War (1845–46), during which Gulab Singh played a controversial role, being accused of collaborating with the British. The war culminated in the Treaty of Lahore, which ceded several Sikh territories, including Jammu and Kashmir, to the British. Shortly afterward, the Treaty of Amritsar (1846) formalised Gulab Singh's acquisition of the region: in exchange for 7.5 million Nanakshahi rupees, he was recognised by the British as Maharaja of Jammu and Kashmir, acquiring the territories between the Indus and Ravi rivers, including Chamba (though not Lahul, in present-day Himachal Pradesh. This was the start of Dogra dynasty, which remained in control over the Princely State of Kashmir and Jammu (as it was then called) until Indian independence in 1947.

Gulab Singh ruled the new state until 1856, when declining health led him to abdicate in favour of his son, Maharaja Ranbir Singh (1830–1885); Gulab Singh then retired to Srinagar, residing there until his death in 1857. Under Ranbir Singh and his successor Pratap Singh (1848–1925), the Dogra Maharajas established Srinagar as their summer capital and undertook extensive renovations of the Sher Garhi Palace, while Jammu, with the Mubarak Mandi Palace, remained the winter capital. This bi-annual shift from one capital to the other capital is the so called Darbar Move. The practice established under the Maharadjas continued after 1947 until 2021, and was revived in 2025.

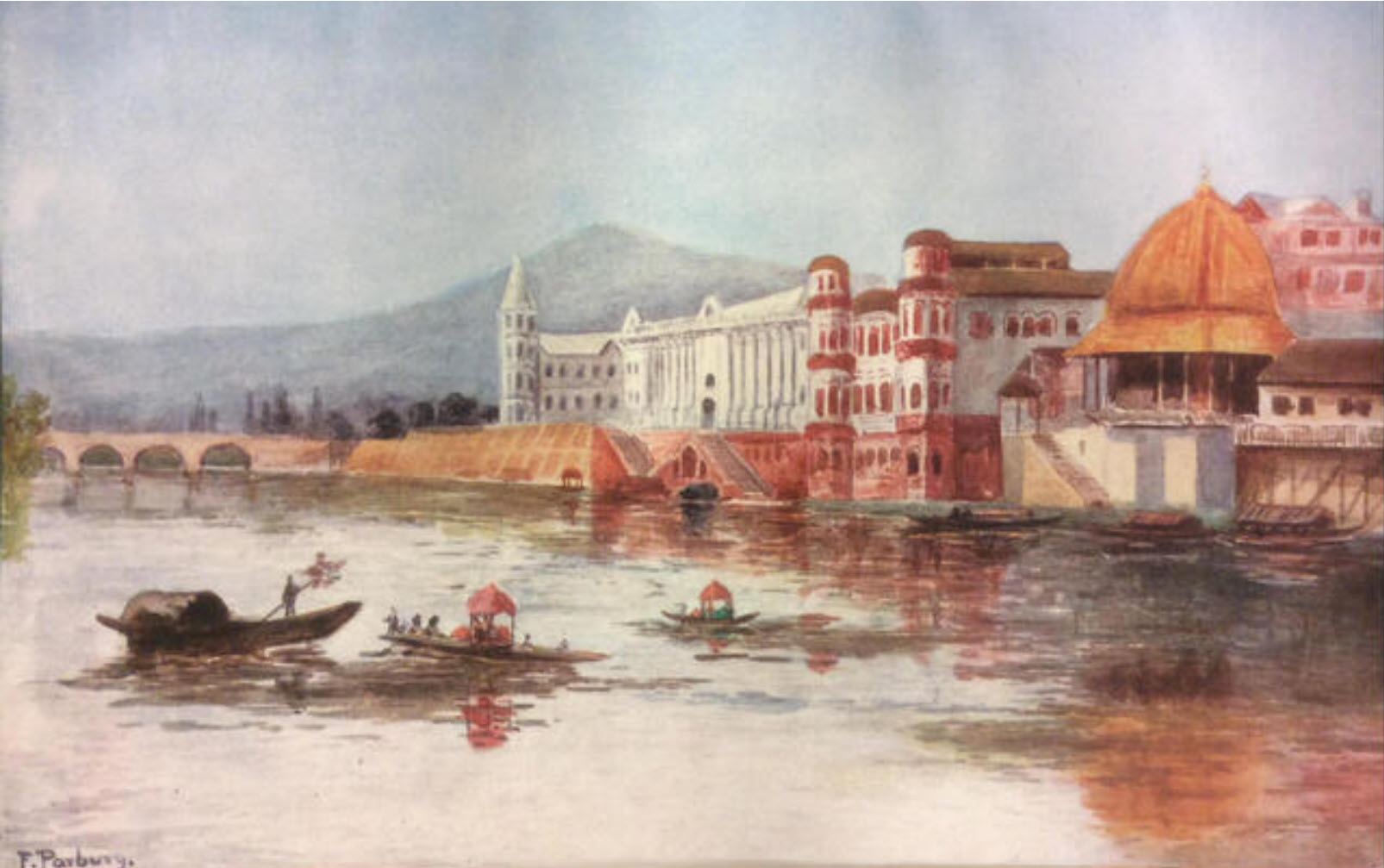
Sher Garhi Palace by Florence Parbury (1909)

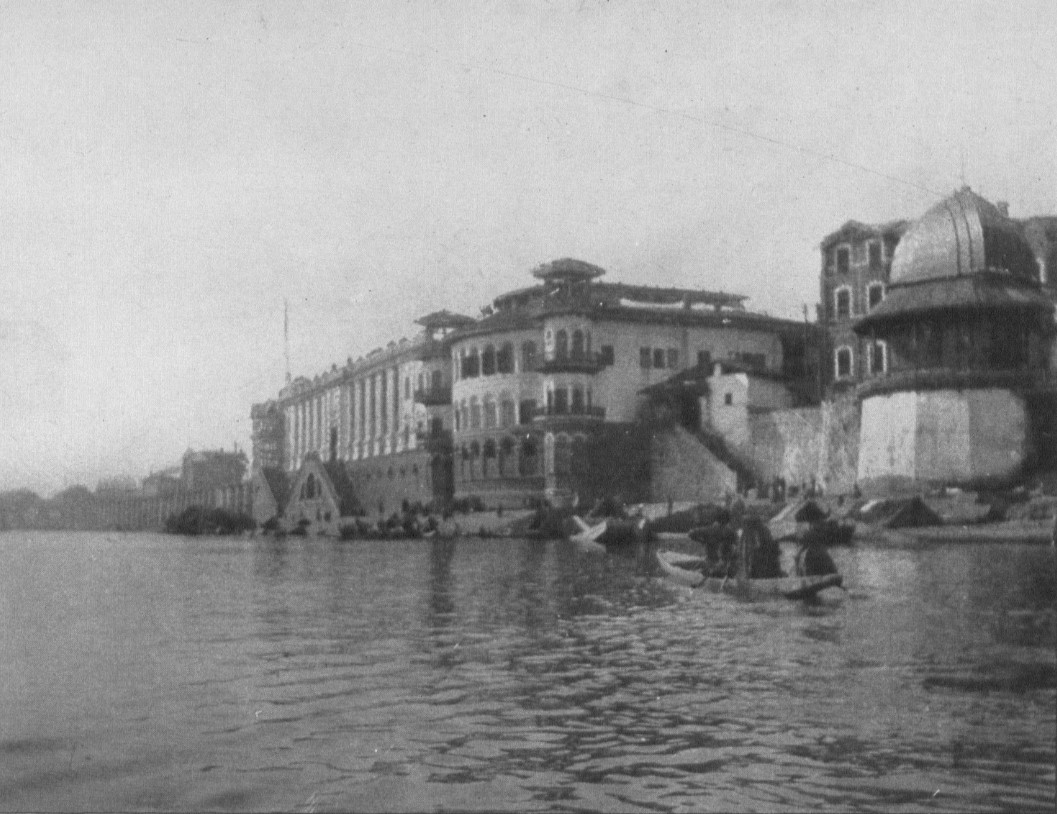
Sher Garhi Palace (1906)

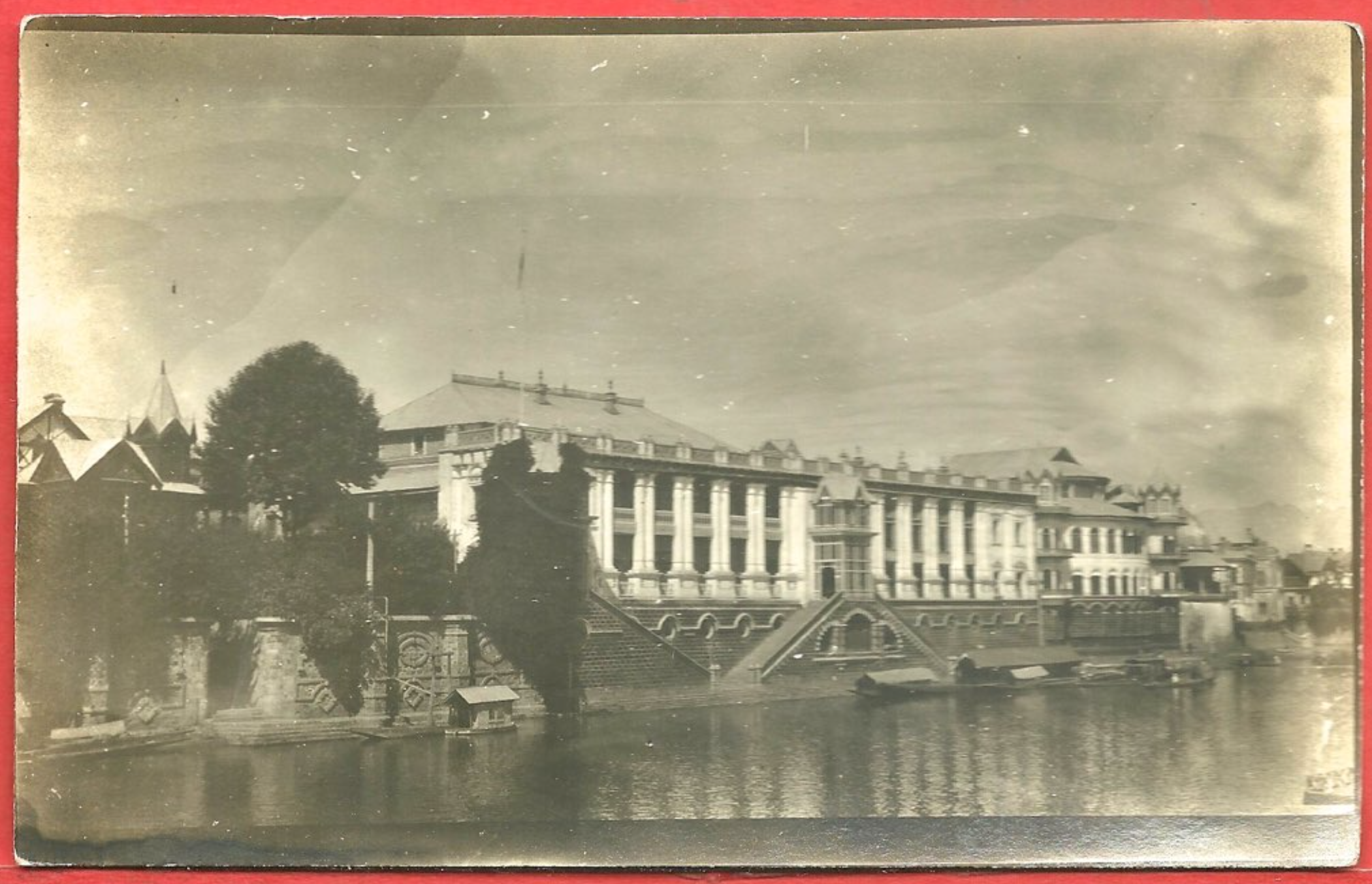
The palace on an old postcard

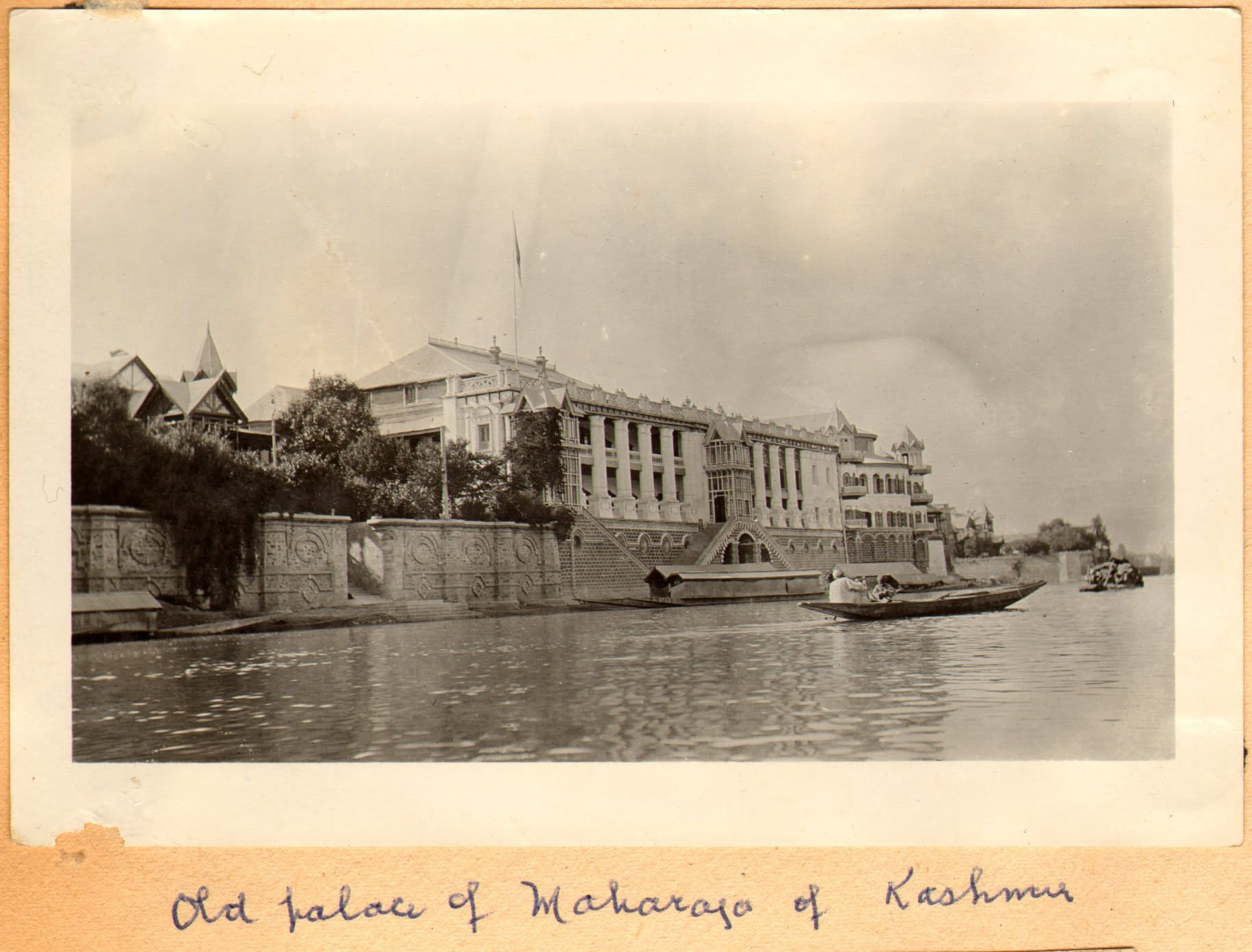
The palace on another old postcard

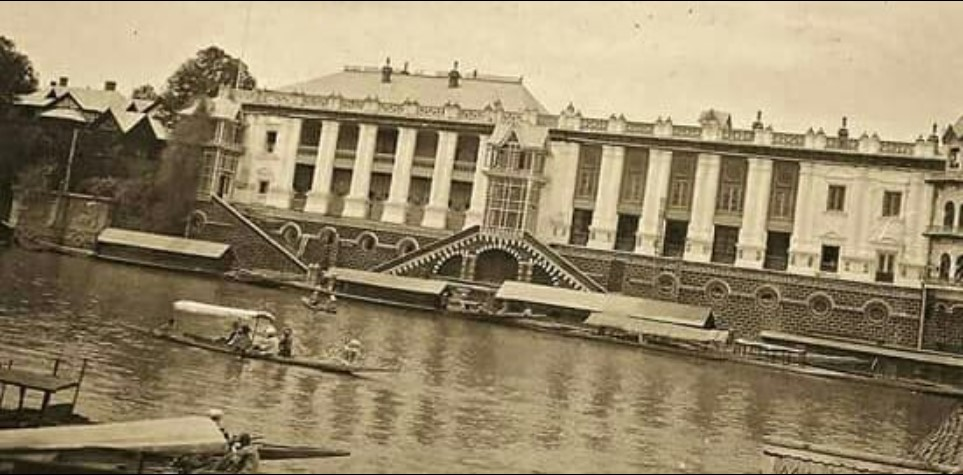
The palace in the 1920s

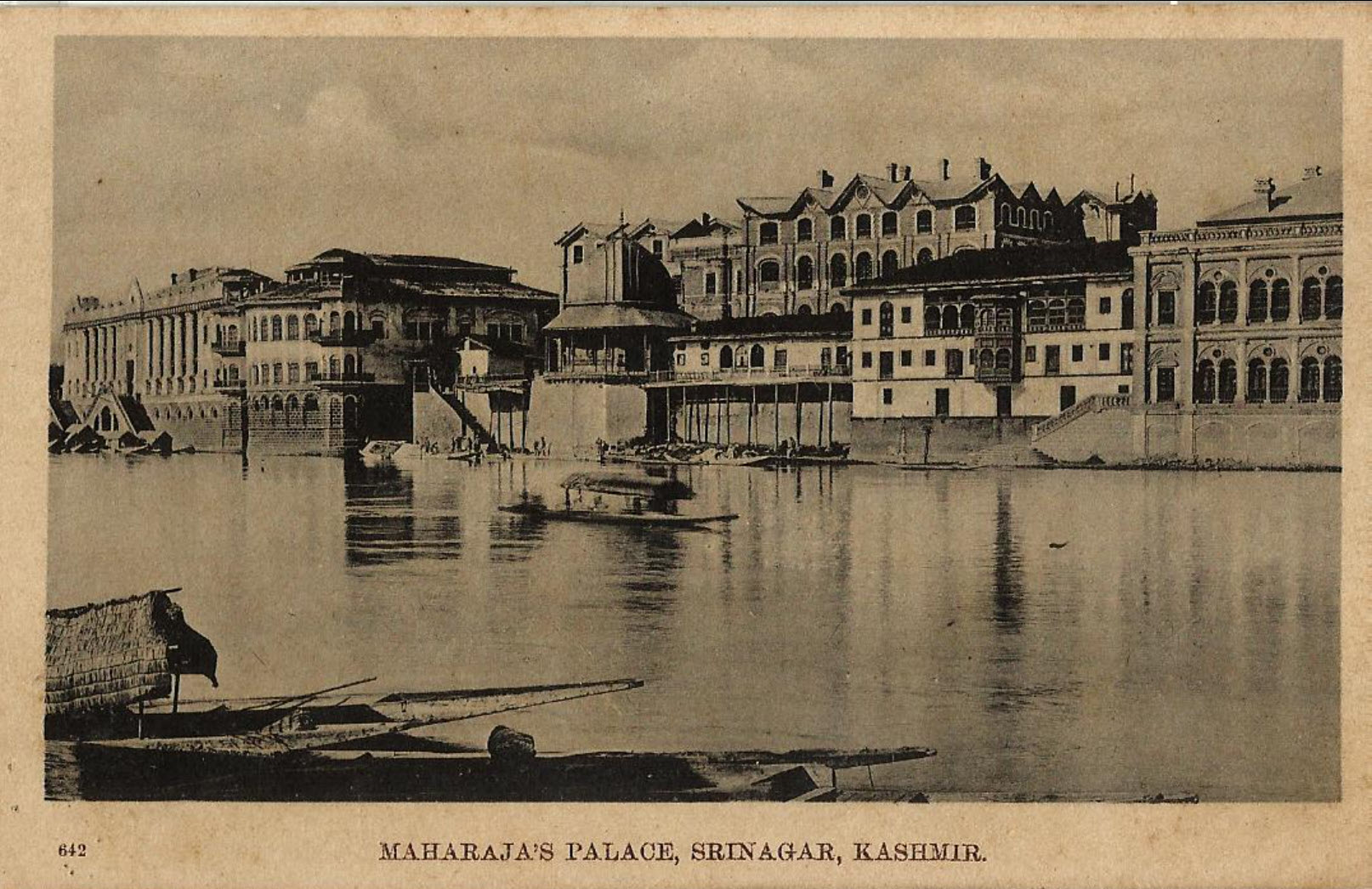
Another view of the palace

=== First half of the 20th century ===
Around 1900, the palace's riverfront along the Jhelum River was rebuilt in a neoclassical style under Maharaja Pratap Singh, characterized by Corinthian columns that enhanced its grandeur. The complex became a notable example of architectural syncretism, blending elements of English and Kashmiri design: its buildings followed a quadrangular layout, built primarily from stone, with intricate wooden doors, ceilings, and roofs.

The palace's role as the primary royal residence began to fade in 1910, when Pratap Singh built Gulab Bhavan, a new summer residence in eastern Srinagar overlooking Dal Lake, reportedly under the supervision of the court engineer Janki Nath Madan. His successor, Maharaja Hari Singh (1895–1961, r. 1925–1949/1952), further beautified and decorated Gulab Bhavan and made it his principal residence. As the royal court's centre of gravity shifted to Gulab Bhavan, Sher Garhi Palace saw a corresponding decline in its use as a royal residence and increasingly served administrative purposes, housing the civil services of the princely state.

Hari Singh left Kashmir for Bombay in 1949, and the Dogra monarchy was formally abolished in 1952. Gulab Bhavan itself was converted into a hotel, The Grand Palace, in 1956; Bharat Hotels took over the property in 1998, restoring and extending it, and rebranded it as The LaLiT Grand Palace Srinagar in 2008.

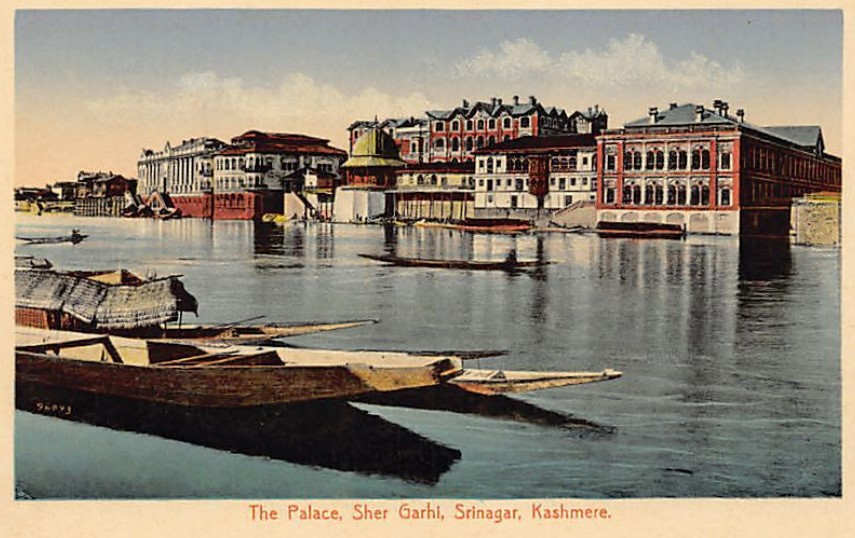
The palace along the Jhelum river

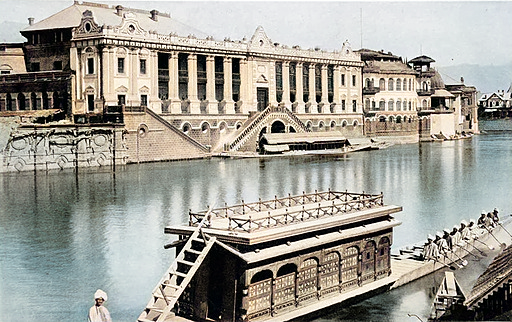
A view of the palace in the 1920s

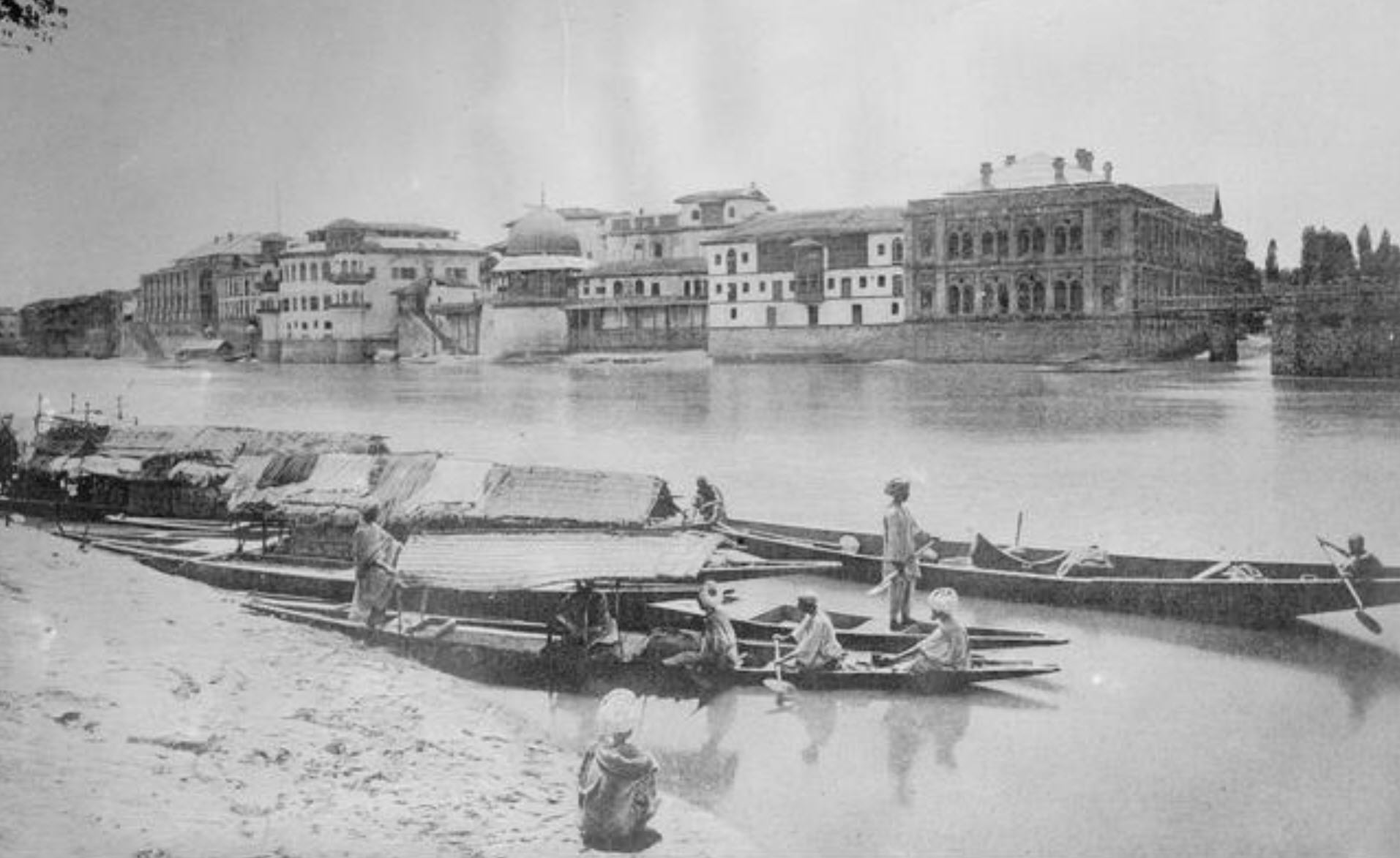
A view of the palace along the Jhelum river (1924)

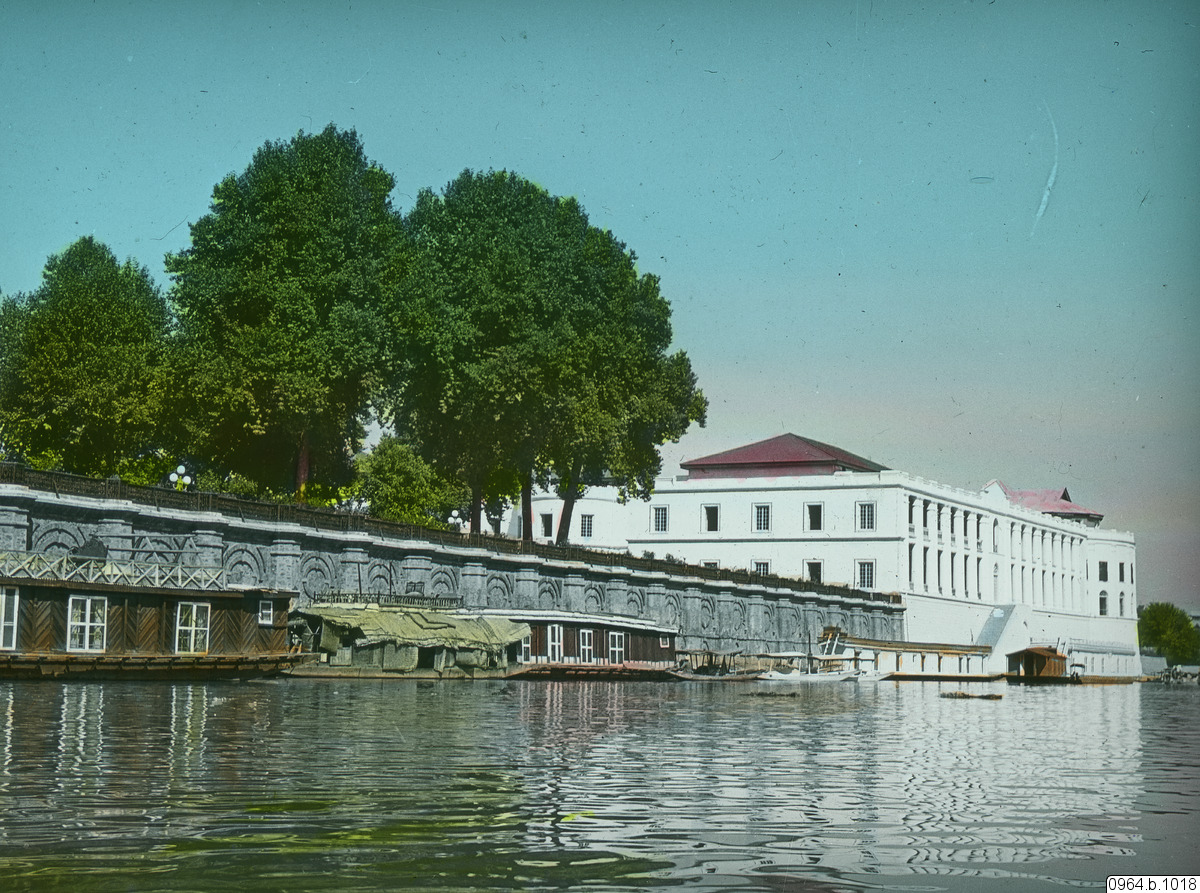
The Sher Garhi Palace was rebuilt in the 1930s after an earthquake (photo by John Törnquist).

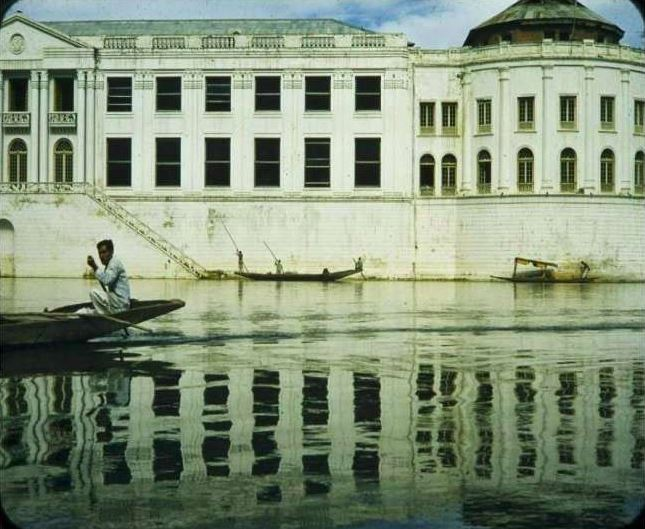
The palace in the 1960s

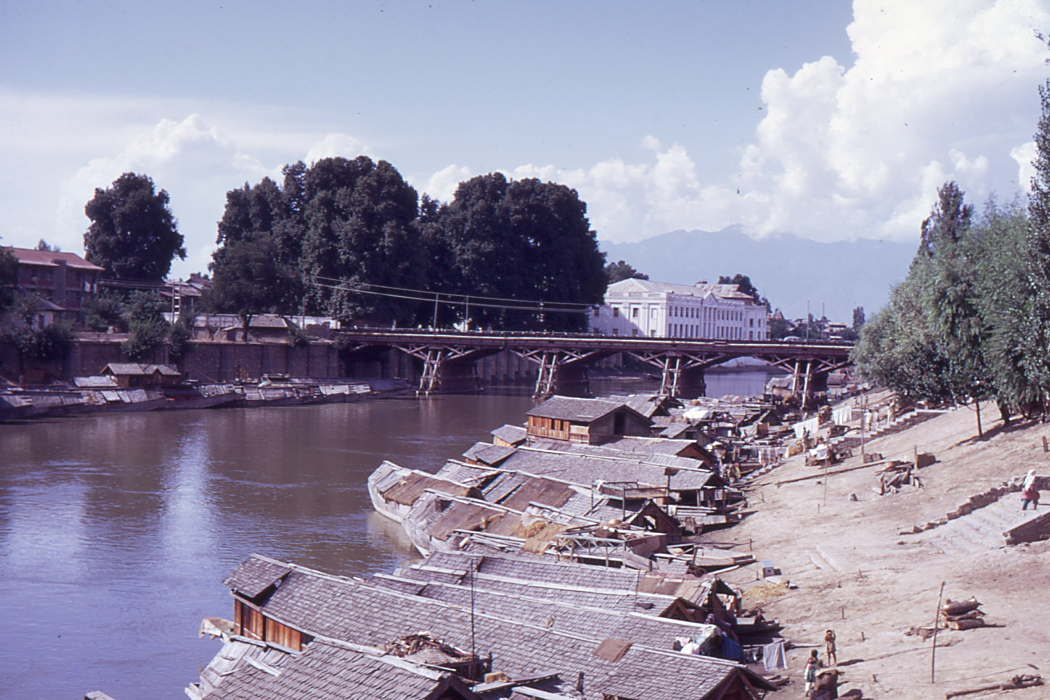
Bridge over the Jhelum river with the Sher Garhi palace in the back (1969), before fires destroyed the riverbank part of the palace

=== 20th century post 1947 ===
After the accession of Kashmir to India, the palace obtained the name the Old Secretariat and initially housed various administrative departments of the government of Jammu and Kashmir. The state assembly and legislative council were also housed in the palace, and the complex is therefore sometimes called the Old Assembly as well.

Major shifts of government departments away from the complex are reported to have taken place under Chief Minister Bakshi Ghulam Mohammad in the 1950s, and the palace was gradually abandoned as an active administrative hub in the following decades.

Fires in the late 1970s and in the early 2000s destroyed major parts of the complex, including much of the Jhelum riverfront.

=== 21st century ===
In 2015, chief minister Mufti Mohammad Sayeed announced that the complex would be restored to conserve its heritage value and attract tourism to Kashmir. It was declared a state protected monument under SRO 270 on 6 July 2017.

In one of the restored 18th-century buildings, known as the old council building or Old Assembly, an art museum gallery opened in 2020. The gallery aims to display around 1,500 miniature paintings from the SPS Museum and related departments, and the complex also houses the archival reference library of the Kashmir Department of Archives, Archaeology and Museums.

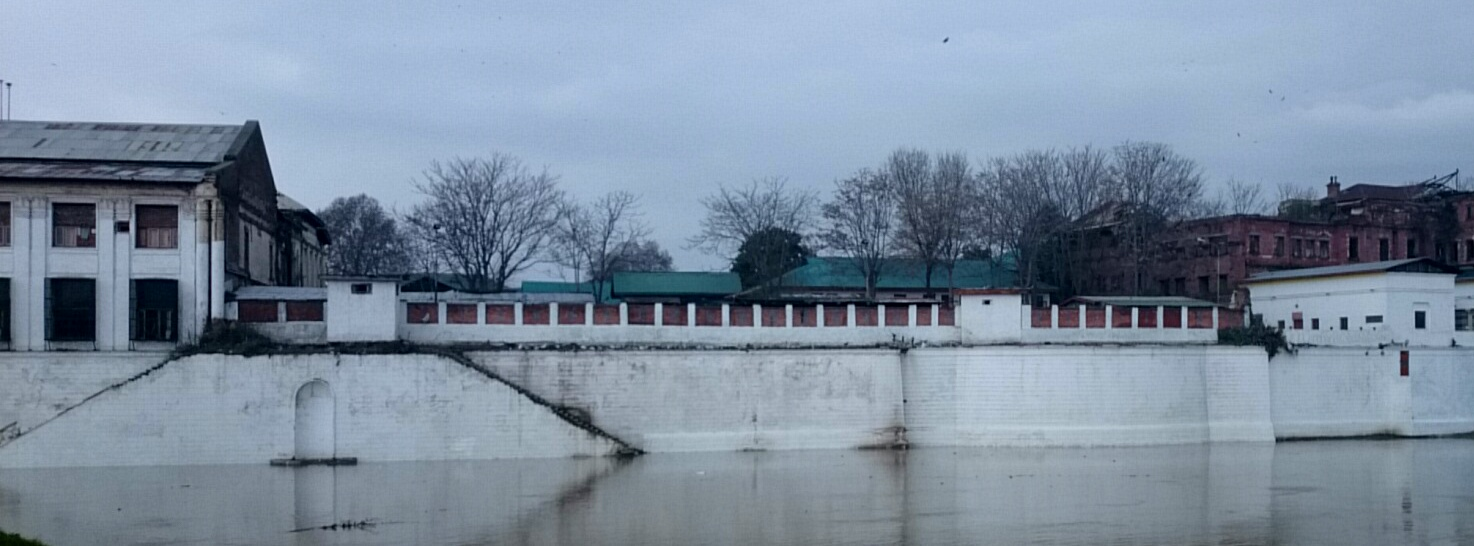
What remained of Jhelum river front of the Sher Garhi Palace after the fires

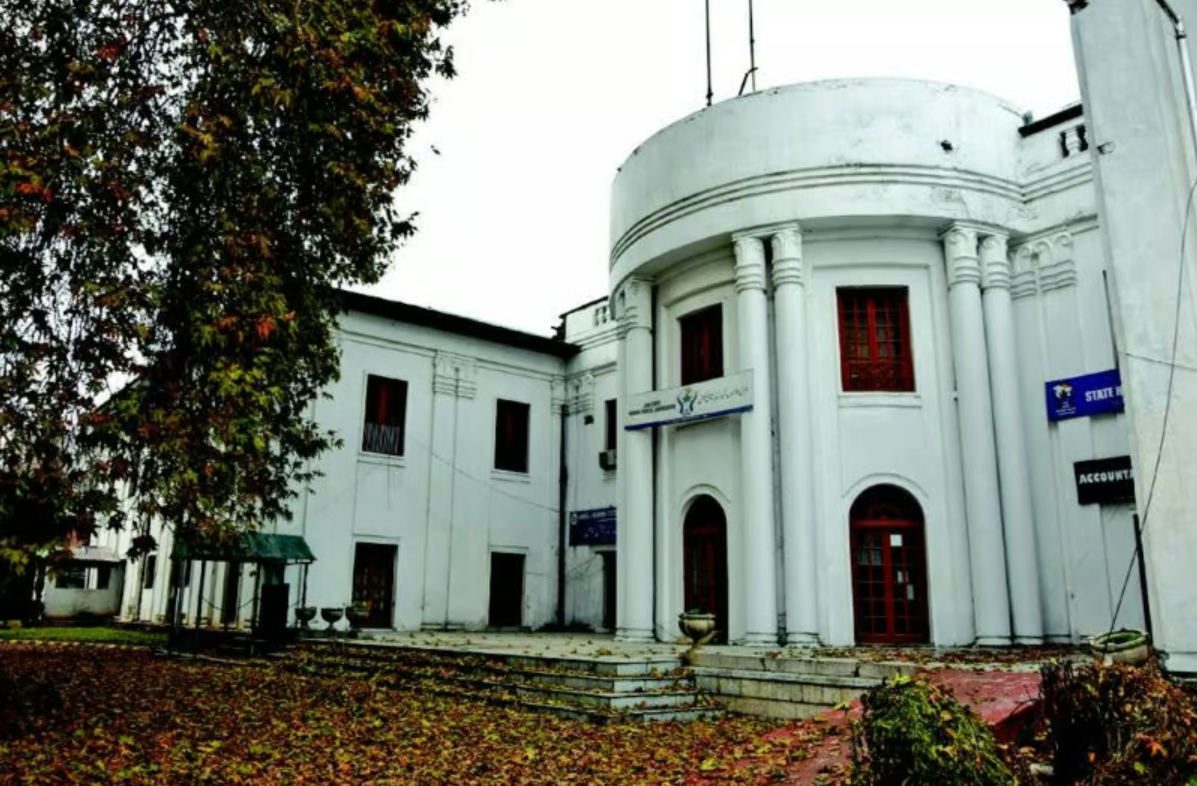
The remaining part of the Jhelum river wing houses the Srinagar City museum

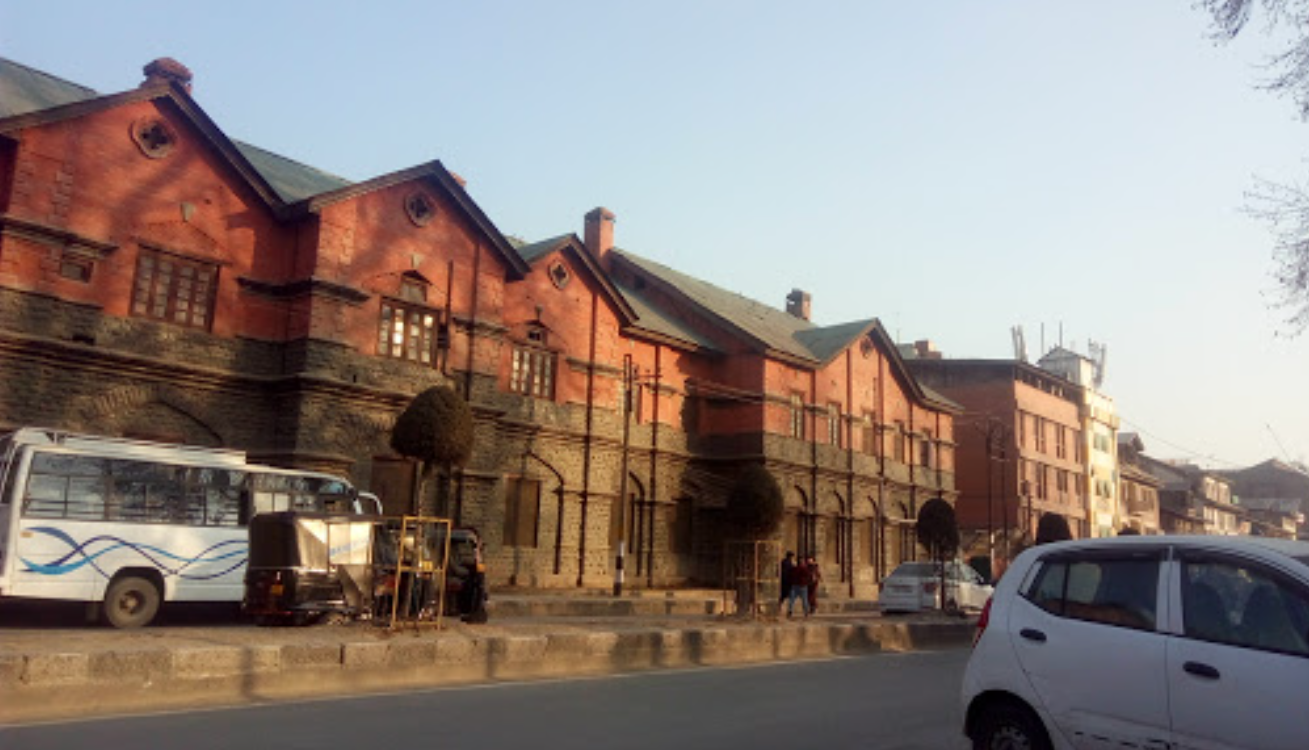
The Old Secretariat building serves now as an art gallery.

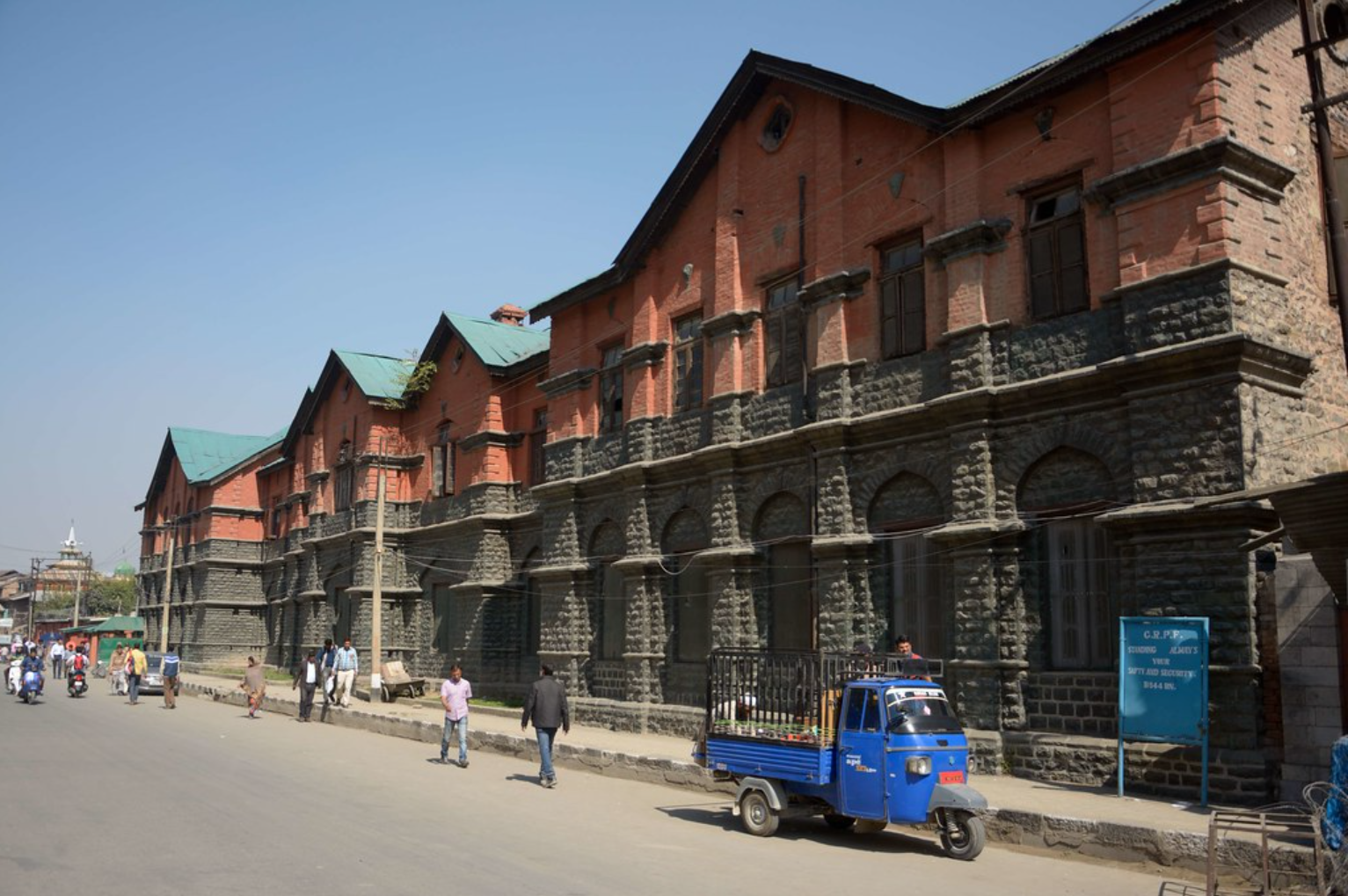
Another view of the wing containing the art gallery.

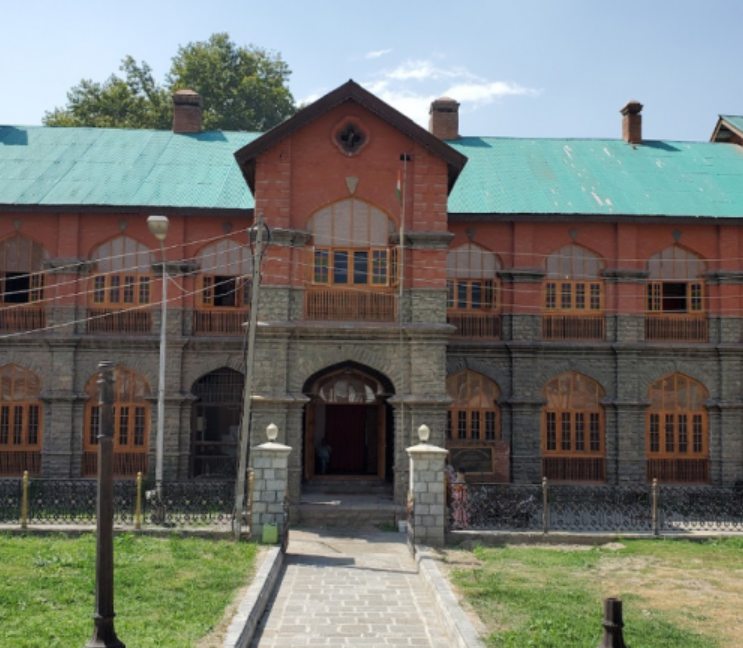
The entrance to the art gallery (2020)

== Shri Gadadhar Ji Temple ==
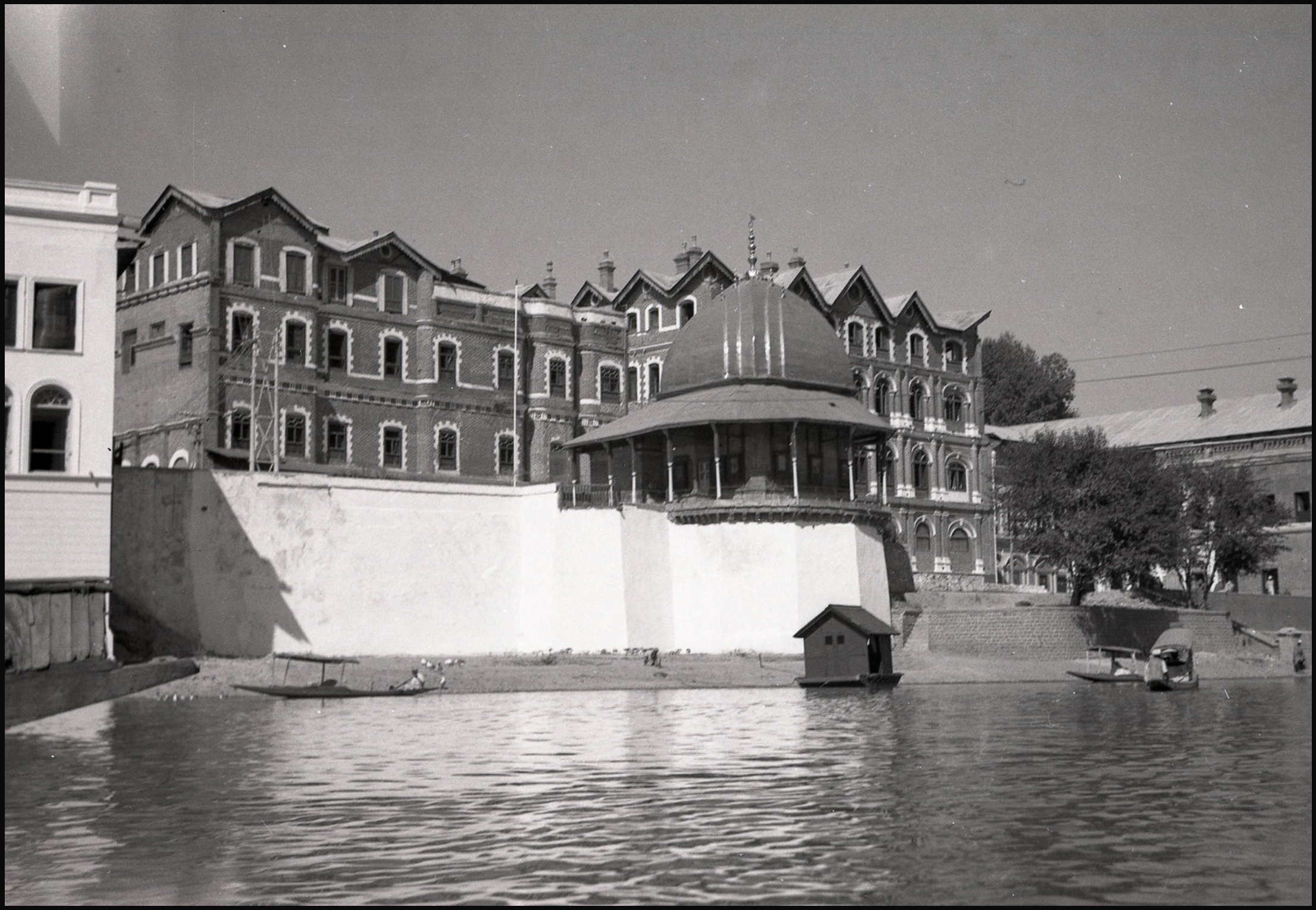
Sher Garhi Palace with the Shri Gadadhar Ji temple (1936)

Within the palace grounds, directly by the river, stands the Shri Gadadhar Ji temple, its roof covered in gold. It was built inside the palace complex by the Dogra Maharajas. The temple shares its name and its dedication to Lord Vishnu — worshipped here as Gadadhar, "holder of the mace" — with a separate, older Gadadhar Ji temple near the Mubarak Mandi Palace in Jammu, built by Maharaja Gulab Singh; According to Sameer Hamdani, the Dogras' Vaishnava temple foundations in Srinagar were a deliberate effort to recast Kashmir as a Vaishnavite land.

The Srinagar temple is managed by the Dharmarth Trust of Jammu and Kashmir, founded in 1846 by Gulab Singh, which has been chaired by Karan Singh, the son of Hari Singh, since 1959.

== 19th century description of the Sher Garhi palace by William Wakefield ==
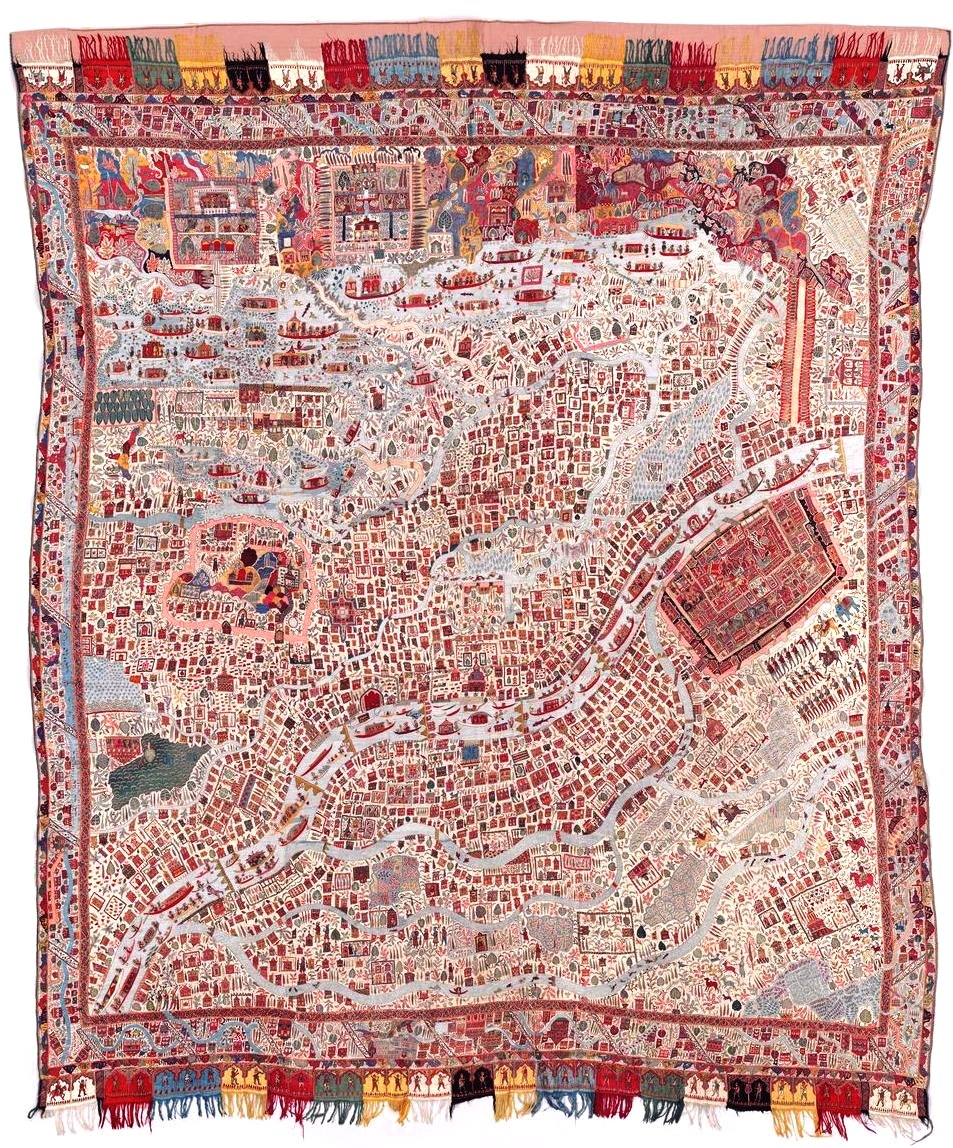
1870s map of Srinagar (Victoria and Albert Museum), the large red block middle right is the Sher Garhi palace

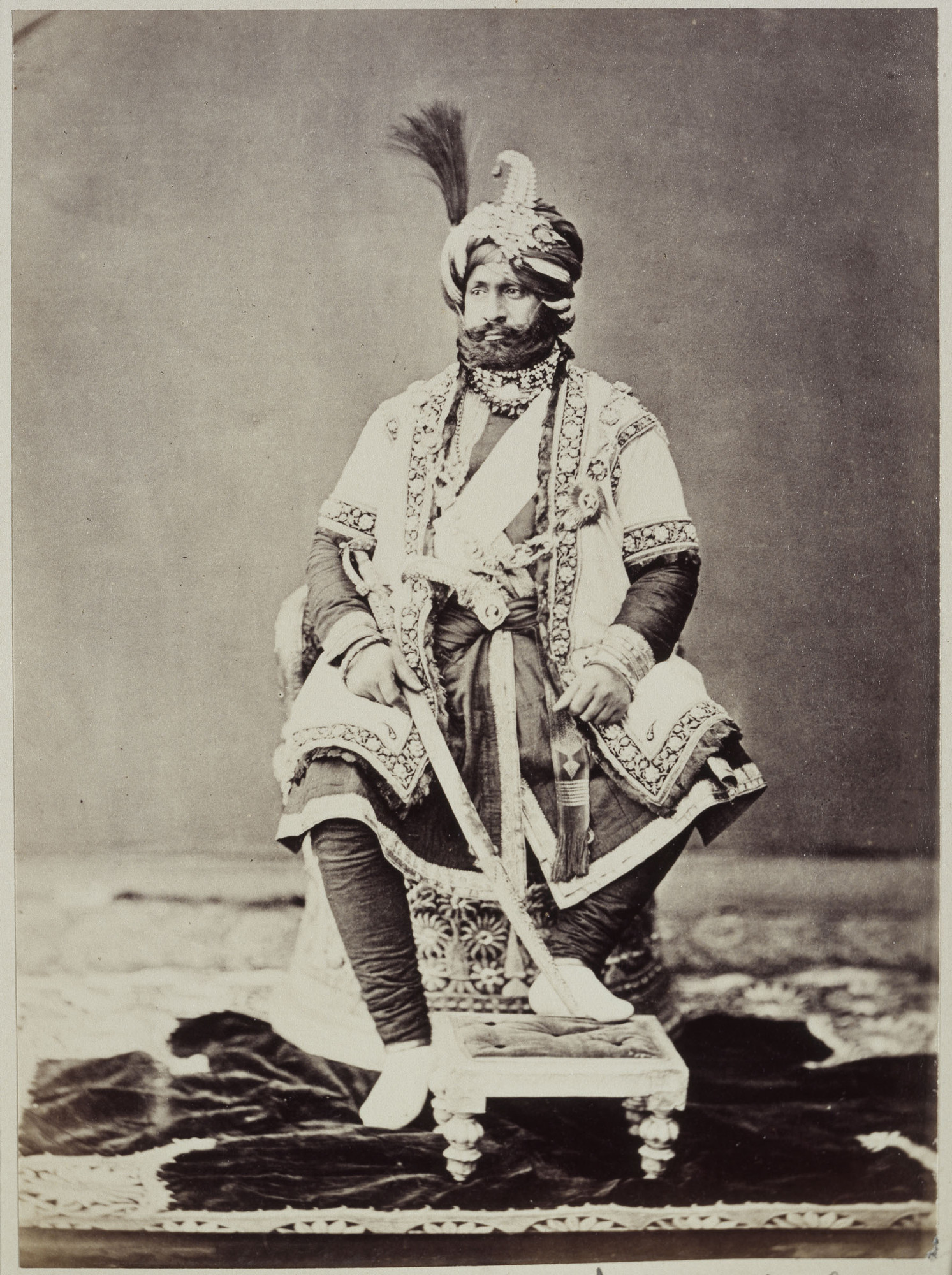
Maharadja Ranbir Singh was ruler over Kashmir when William Wakefield visited Srinagar

A description of the palace and its surroundings can be found in The Happy Valley: Sketches of Kashmir & the Kashmiris written by William Wakefield in 1879.

"Pursuing our course down the river the sides of which in former days were em- banked from the first to the last bridge, by an embankment composed of large blocks of limestone, of which at present the ruined remains are all that is left we soon come to a large building, the Sher Garhi, the city fort and palace.

"Situated on the left bank, it presents to the river, which flows along its eastern side, a long loop- holed wall, with bastions rising between twenty and thirty feet above the general level of the water, surmounted by roomy, but lightly-built, houses. Its southern and western sides are protected by a wide ditch; the Kut-i-Kul canal bounds it on the north, and in its interior are grouped a number of dwelling- houses for the officials of the court, government offices, and barracks.

"On its wall, facing the river, and perched upon one of the bastions, is a large double-storied house, the abode of the Dewan or Prime Minister, and just below his residence is a long lofty building, the government treasury, containing shawls, ‘pushmeena,’ coin, and other valuable property.

"A curious-looking wooden building comes next, the Rang Mahal or ‘audience hall,’ a part of the royal residence, which is just below it, styled the Baradarri, and which is unquestionably the most important modern structure in Srinagar. It is a large irregular building of a peculiar style, for while partly of native architecture, one portion, with a large projecting bow, partakes somewhat of an European character. A flight of wide stone steps leads up from the water’s edge at the angle of this building, and conducts into the palace.

"Adjoining is the temple frequented by the ruler and family, called the Maharaj-ke-Mandir, the domed roof of which is covered with thin plates of pure gold, which glitters in the sunlight, causing it to be plainly perceptible a long distance away.

"To reach the interior of the palace, one ascends by the before -mentioned steps, which at all times of the day appear thronged with people, some waiting to prefer petitions to the sovereign or his ministers as they descend to their boats, others to obtain a hearing or justice, which is here administered in open court daily by the governor. To the more private portion of the palace they have no access; for, guarding the gateway at the top of the stairs which leads directly into the royal abode, stands a sentry, a warrior belonging to the Kashmir, army, and near by is the guard-room, what we should call in our service the main-guard."

Wakefield's "Maharaj-ke-Mandir" almost certainly refers to the same gold-roofed temple described above as the Shri Gadadhar Ji temple, though the two sources do not use a consistent name.

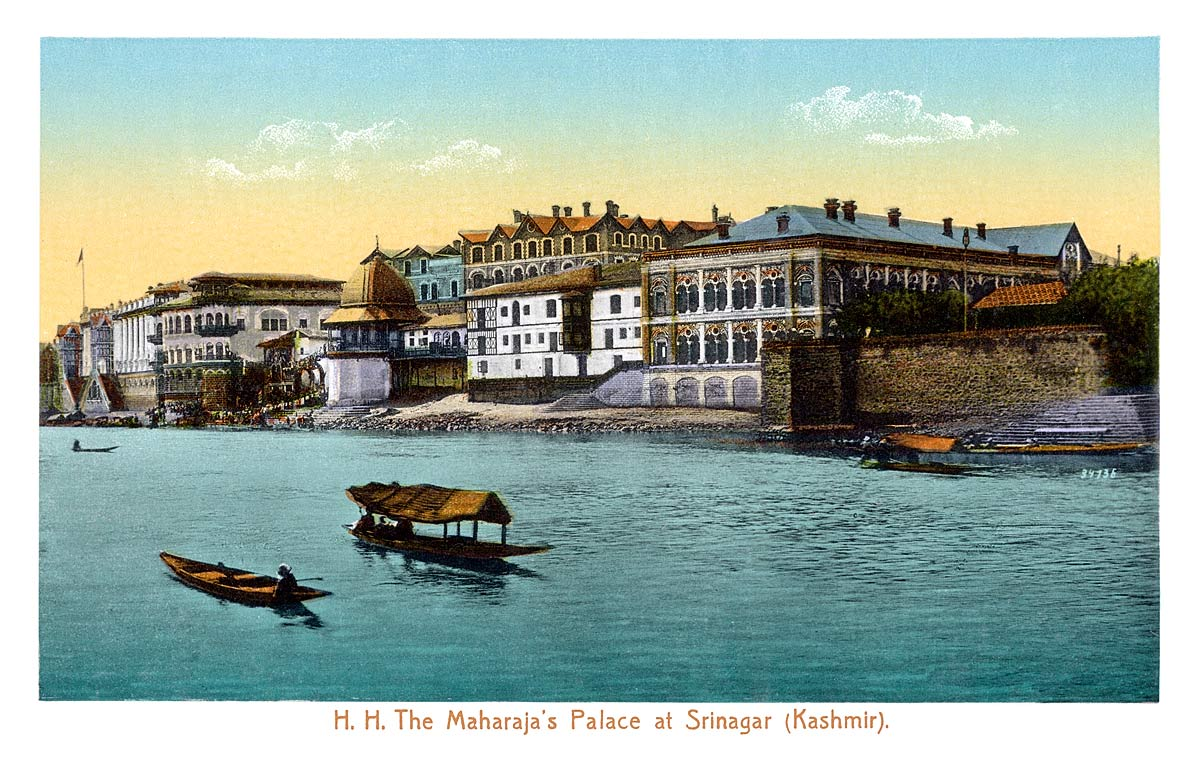
Sher Garhi Palace in its heyday

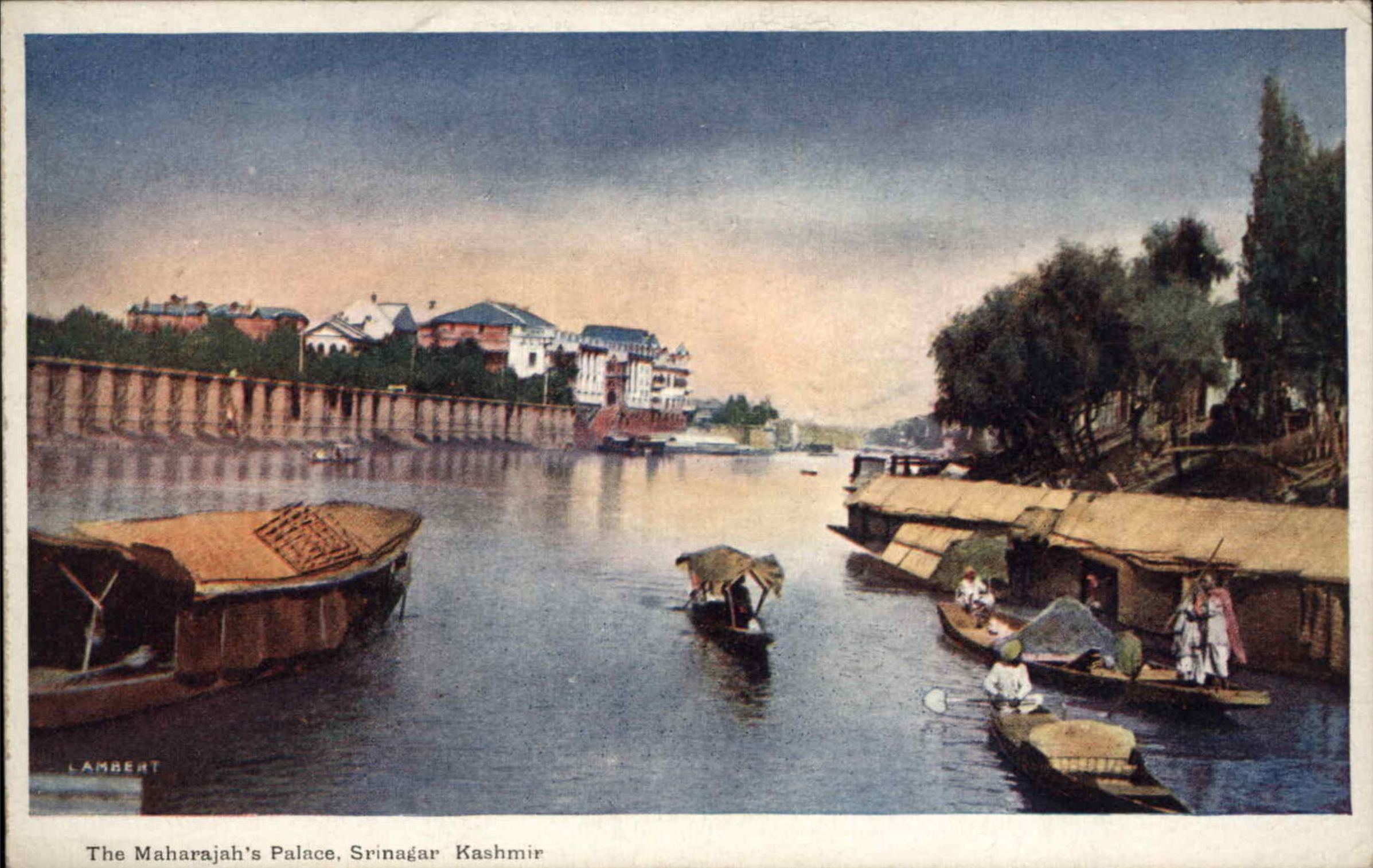
Sher Garhi Palace along the Jhelum river

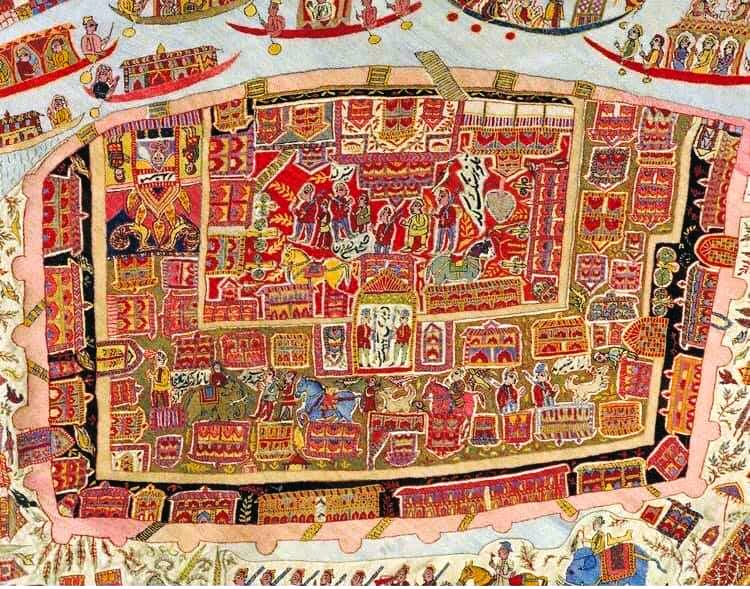
Detail from the 1870s Srinagar map showing the palace

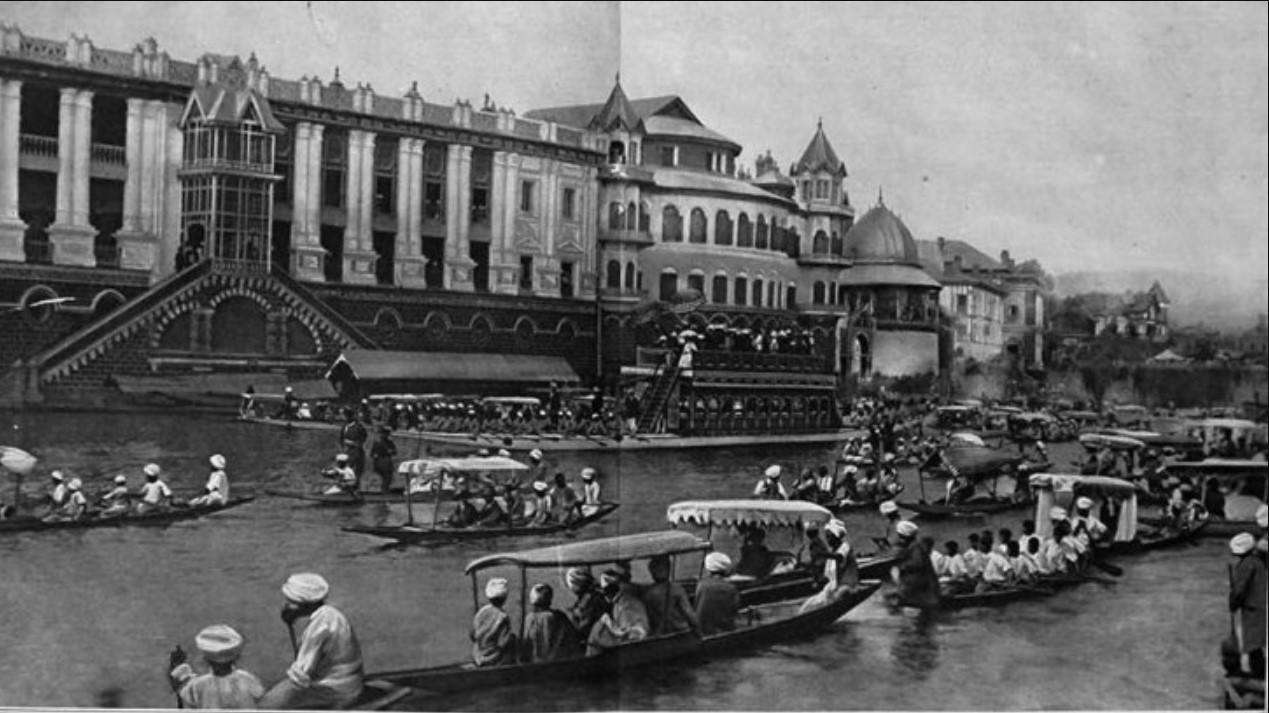
The Maharadja arriving by barge at the Sher Garhi Palace

== The Sher Garhi palace in the 1940s ==
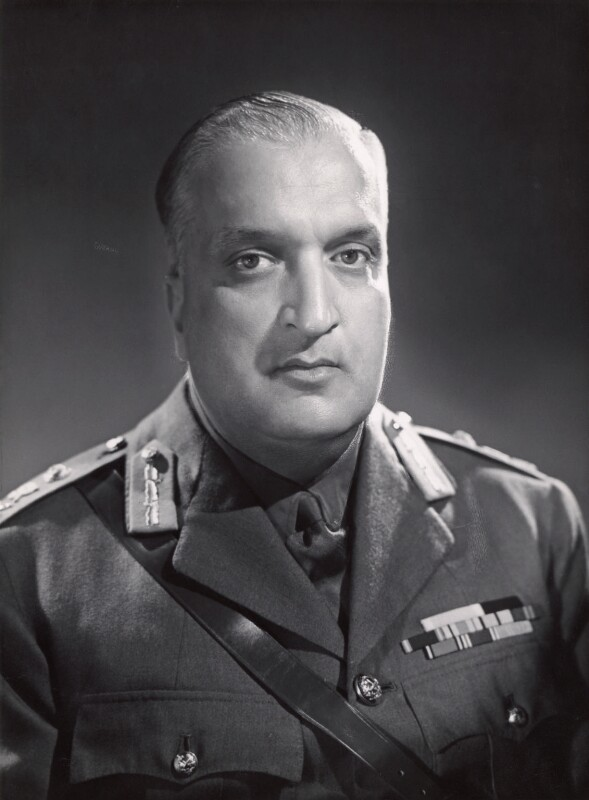
Maharadja Hari Singh, who ruled Kashmir in the 1940s

Another description of the palace can be found in In the land of Kashmir, Ladakh & Gilgit written by R C Arora in May 1940.

"The grand magnificent buildings with huge massive walls, lofty columns, gigantic towers and a massive gilt domed temple standing on the left bank the Jhelum below Amirakadal are the old palaces, called 'Shergarhi' but now the Secretariat of Kashmir Government. The buildings constitute an excellent well-decorated Darbar Hall, Governor's Office, State treasury, etc. A long vista of broad river with reflections of magnificent buildings and gliding of boats on its placid waters backed by the distant mountain ranges makes a most picturesque scene. The charm of the illuminations on these buildings on occasions like Maharaja's birthday, Diwali etc. is indescribably fascinating.

"The palace was badly injured by the earthquake but part of it has been re-built. Beyond the golden temple is the beautiful mansion built by the late Raja Sir Amar Singh, father of the present Maharaja."

Arora's "golden temple" likewise appears to be the same structure as the Shri Gadadhar Ji temple above.
