= List of bridges in Srinagar =

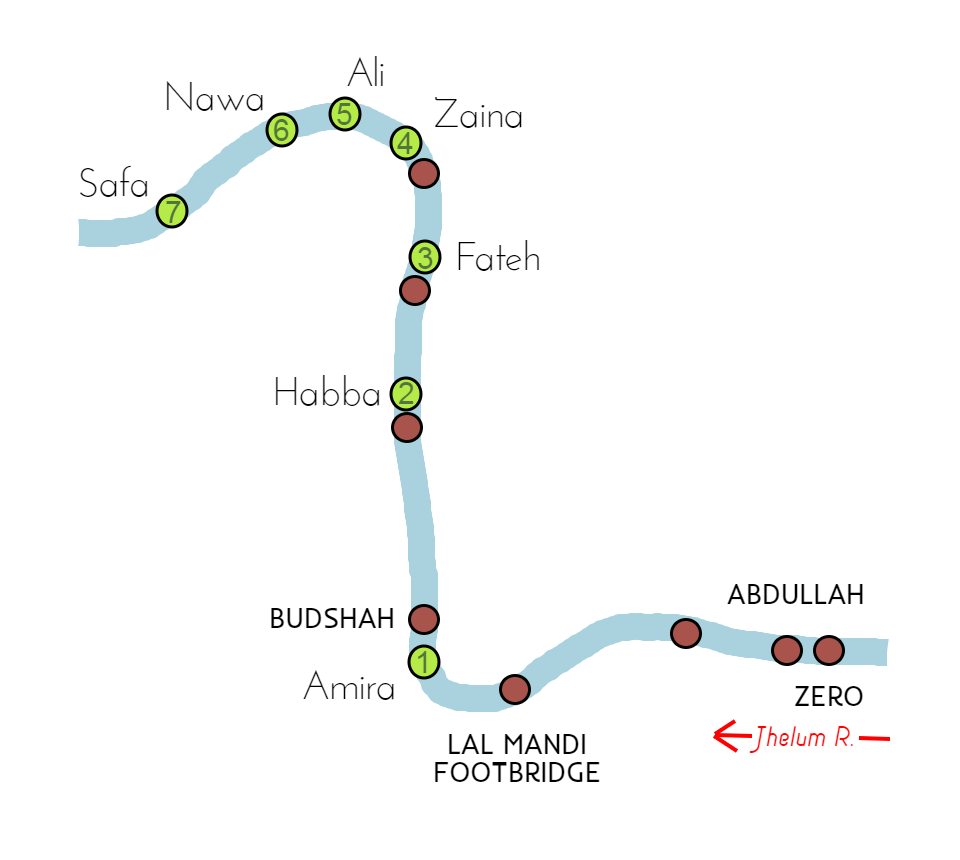
Bridges across the Jhelum in Srinagar city. Seven in green represent the old kadals. Brown are the newer bridges.

The city of Srinagar in the Union Territory of Jammu and Kashmir, India, originally had seven wooden bridges across the Jhelum River. The seven bridges — Amira, Habba, Fateh, Zaina, Aali, Nawa and Safa — were constructed between the 15th and 18th century. This number remained unchanged for at least five centuries. In the Kashmiri language, these bridges are known as kadals. Localities around them have been eponymously named.

The old seven bridges are of similar construction and made of Cedrus deodara. Apart from heavy rocks used to add weight to the foundation, the entire bridge was made of wood. A number of passages allow for the flow of water making them considerably strong against water level and flow changes. They have been reconstructed a number of times. In 1841, bridges 3 to 7 were washed away. In 1893, bridges 2 to 7 were washed away.

== Bridges across the Jhelum ==
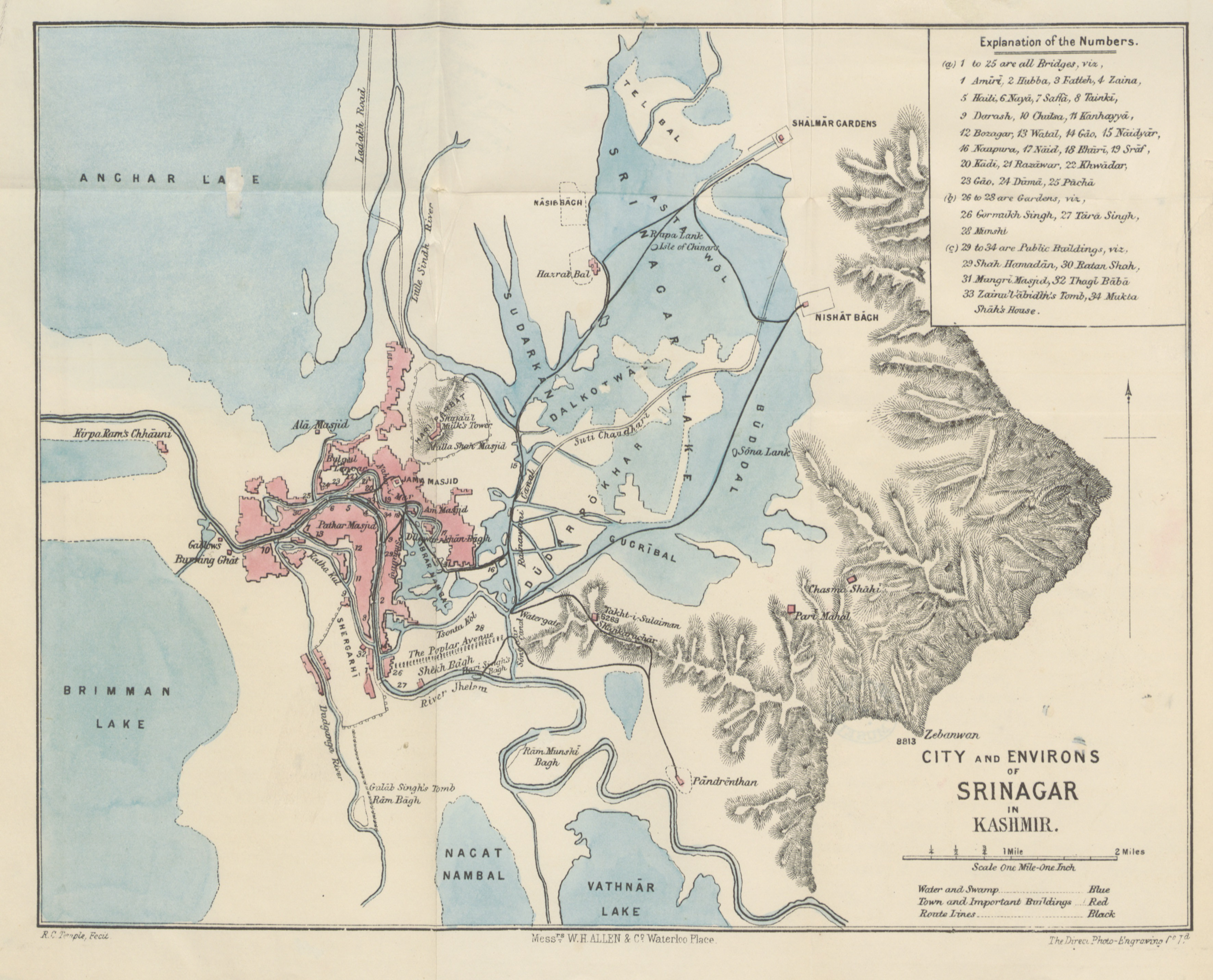
1887, numbers 1 to 25 represent bridges

Habba, 1864

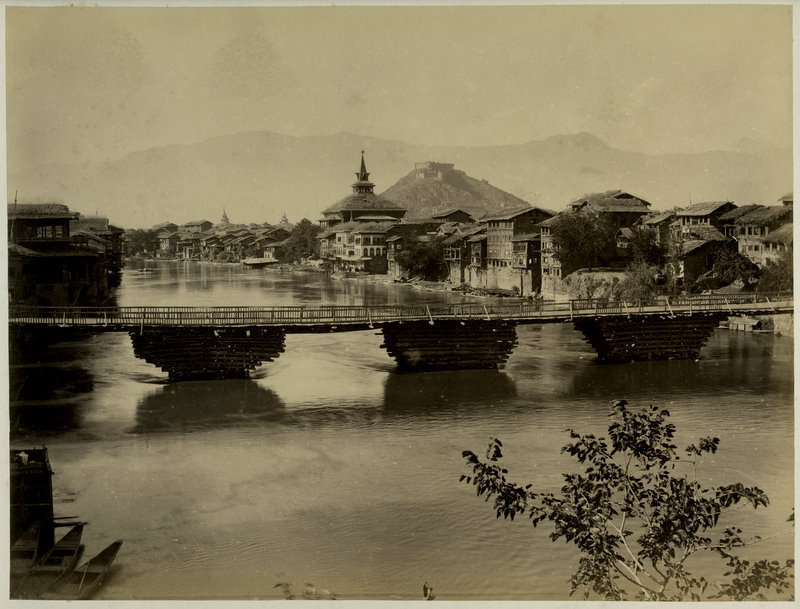
Fateh, c.1880s

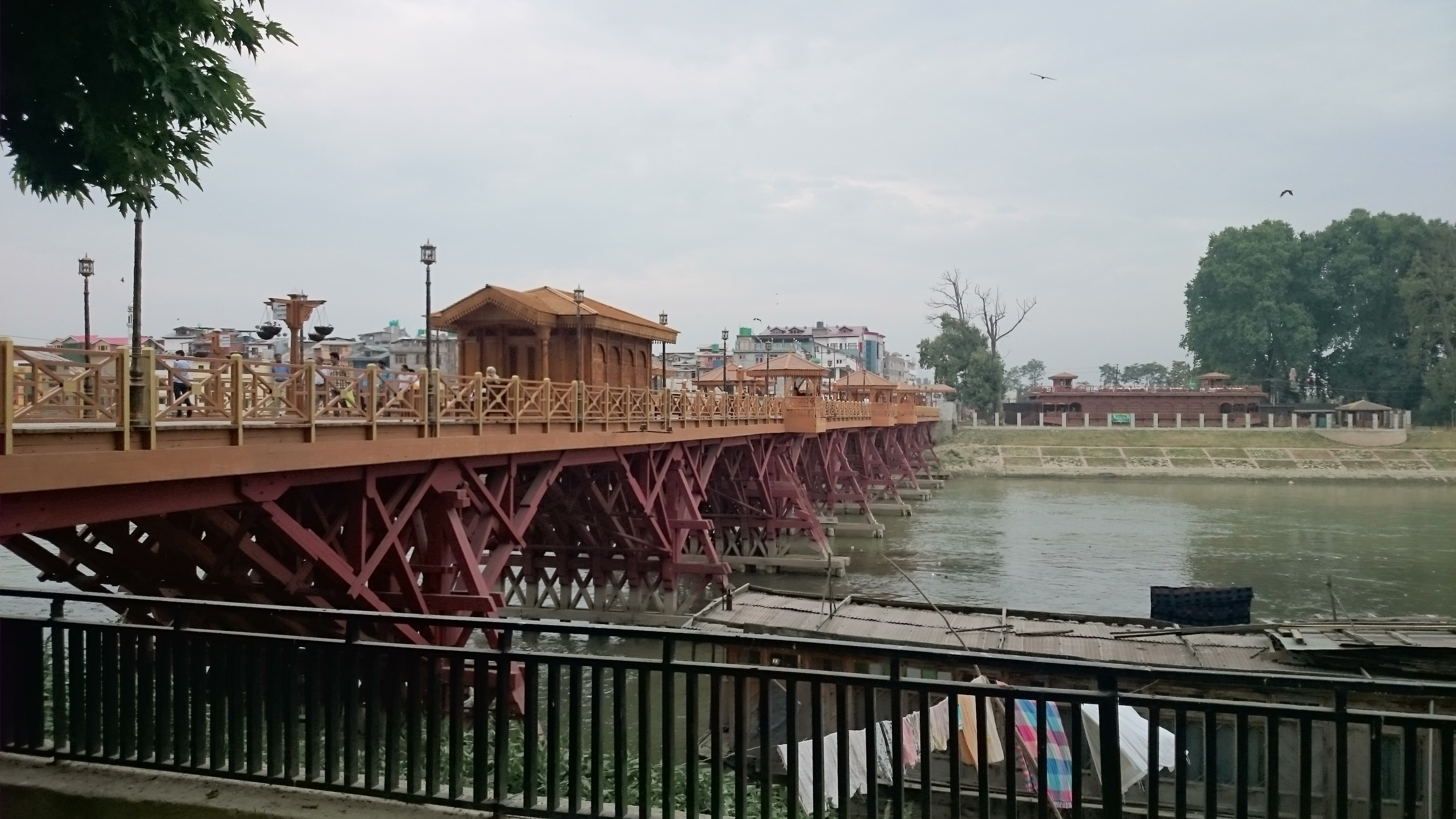
Zero, 2016

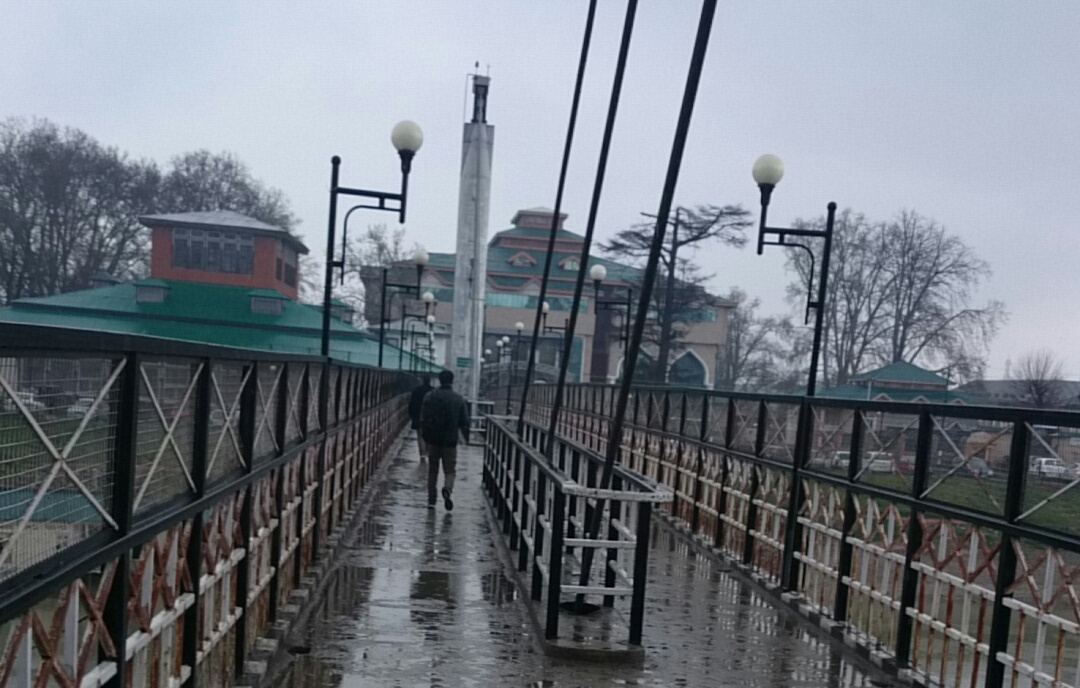
Lal Mandi, 2016

Name	Year	Length	Breadth	Notes
The original seven
Amira Kadal	1773	122 m (400 ft)	20 ft (6.1 m)	The first bridge; was renamed Pratap Kadal on reconstruction but the old name continues to be used. Alternately spelt Amiri, Amiran, Ameeri.
Habba Kadal	1550	88 m (289 ft)	24 ft (7.3 m)	The second bridge; a row of shops ran along the edges. Has also been spelt as Hubba. The New Habba Kadal bridge is a few meters off.
Fateh Kadal	1499	80 m (260 ft)	17 ft (5.2 m)	The third bridge; also spelt Fatteh, Fati.
Zaina Kadal	1426	87 m (285 ft)	24 ft (7.3 m)	The fourth bridge;
Aali Kadal	1417	74 m (243 ft)	17 ft (5.2 m)	The fifth bridge; alternate date of construction 1415. Other spellings that have been used include Haili and Alli.
Nawa Kadal	1666	68 m (223 ft)	18 ft (5.5 m)	The sixth bridge; rebuilt in 1953. Also spelt Naya.
Safa Kadal	1670	100 m (330 ft)	19 ft (5.8 m)	The seventh bridge; alternately built in 1664. Alternate spellings used Saffa, Safr, Suffa.
Newer bridges
Zero Bridge	1950s	160 m (520 ft)	9 m (30 ft)	
Abdullah Bridge	1990s	200 m (660 ft)	14 m (46 ft)	
Lal Mandi Footbridge	2005	125 m (410 ft)	4 m (13 ft)	
Budshah Bridge	1957	100 m (330 ft)	25 m (82 ft)	Also known as Alamgir bridge.
New Habba Kadal	2001	100 m (330 ft)	12 m (39 ft)	
New Fateh Kadal				
New Zaina Kadal				

== Other bridges ==
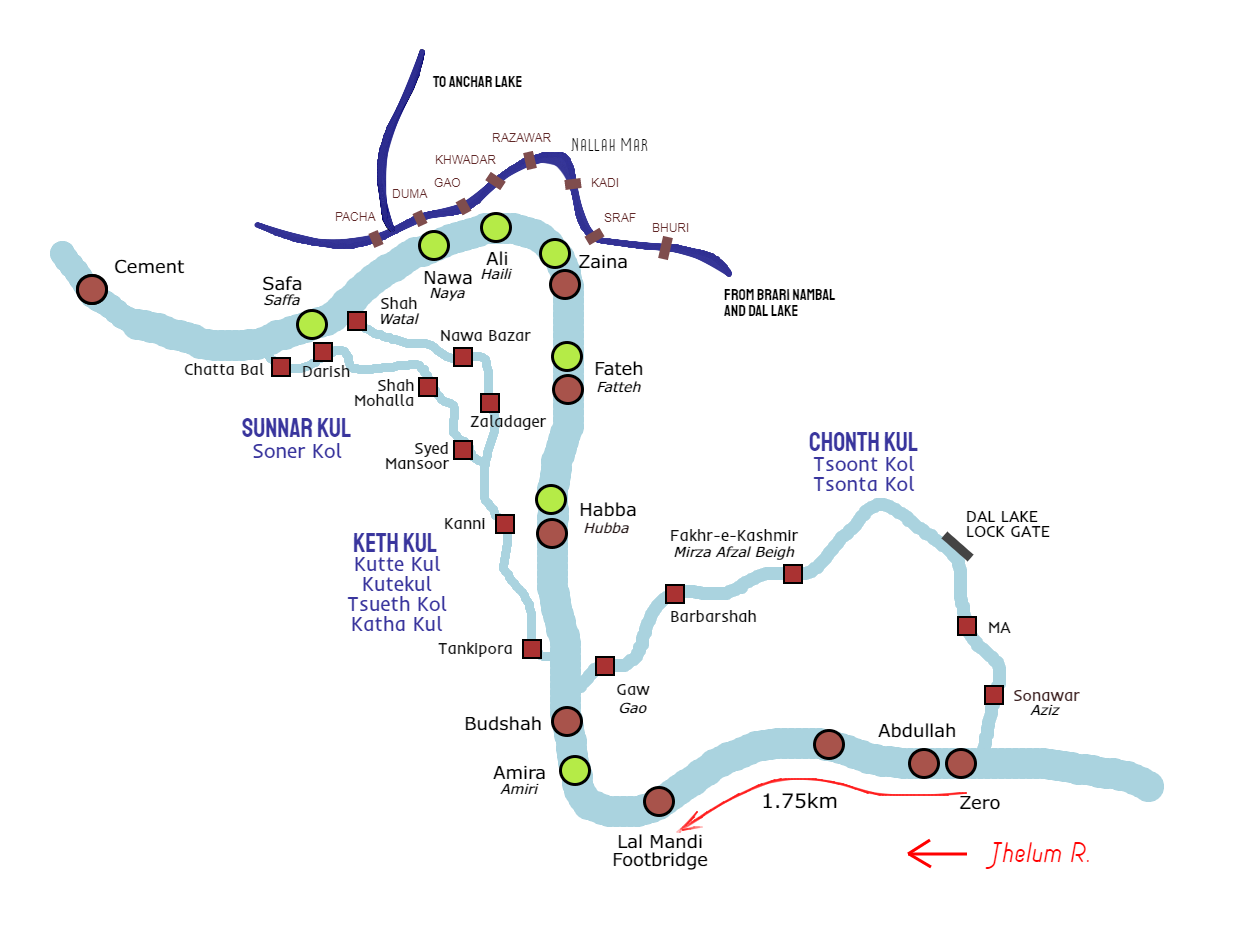
Jhelum with Chonth Kul, Keth Kul, Sunnar Kul. Nallah Mar was filled in the 1970s.

Name of Canal / Drain	Bridges
Former
Nallah Mar (Mar Canal, Mar Kol, Nahari Mar)	Rajwir/ Rajauri. Naopura, Naid, Bhuri, Sraf, Kadi, Razawar, Khwadar, Gao, Duma, Pucha.
Existing
Kutte Kol (Keth Kul, Kutte Kul, Kutekul, Tsueth Kol, Katha Kul)	Tankipora, Kanni, Zaladager, Nawa Bazar, Shah/ Watal. Tainki, Darash, Chutsa, Kanhayya, Bozagar, Watal.
Tsoont Kol (Chonth Kul, Tsoont Kol)	Sonawar/ Aziz, MA, Fakhr-e-Kashmir/ Mirza Afzal Beigh, Barbar Shah, Gaw. Gao, Rainawari, Naidyar. Githa
Sunnar Kul (Soner Kol)	Shah Mohalla Footbridge, Darish, Chatta Bal, Syed Mansoor.

=== Oont Kadal ===
Oont Kadal (camel bridge) is a 17th-century structure located on the Dal Lake. It was restored with Germany's assistance in 2018-2021.
