= Lal Mandi Footbridge =

Footbridge in Jammu and Kashmir, India

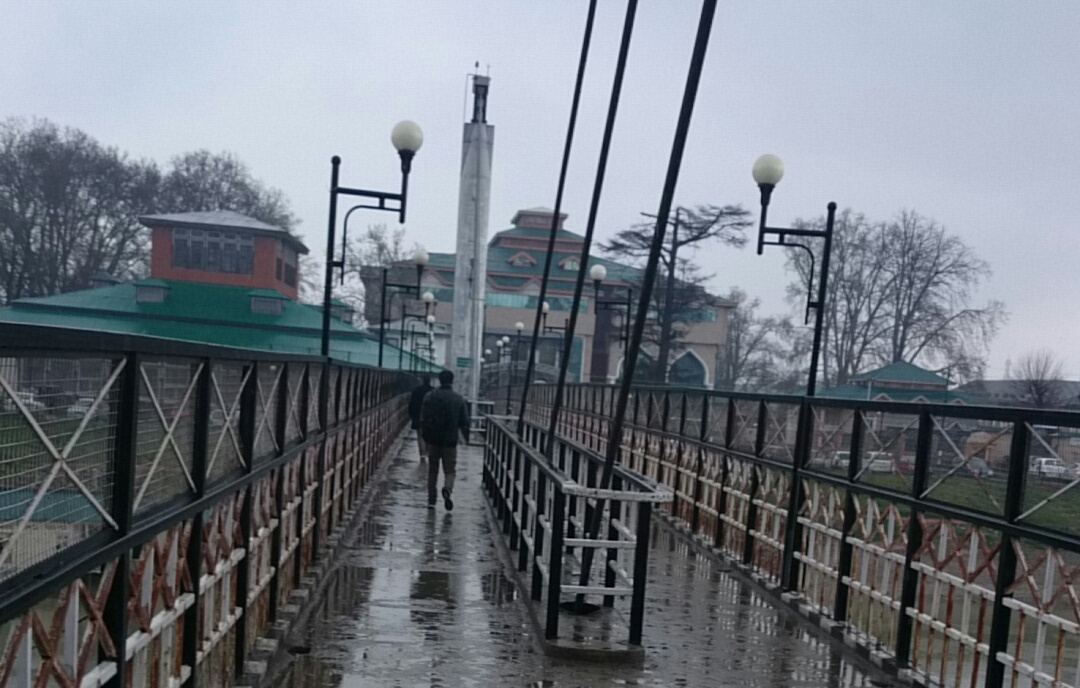
- Coordinates: 34°4′5.81″N 74°48′44.55″E
- Carries: Bicycles, Pedestrians
- Crosses: Jhelum
- Locale: Srinagar, Jammu and Kashmir, India
- Preceded by: Abdullah Bridge
- Followed by: Amira Kadal

Characteristics
- Design: Suspension Bridge
- Material: Concrete, Steel
- Total length: 130 metres (430 ft)
- Width: 4 metres (13 ft)
- Longest span: 66 metres (217 ft)
- No. of spans: 3
- Piers in water: 2

History
- Opened: 13 July 2005

The Lal Mandi Footbridge is a suspension-type pedestrian bridge located in the city of Srinagar in the Indian union territory of Jammu and Kashmir. It connects Wazir Bagh areas of the city to the city centre Lal Chowk. Completed in July 2005, it was the first of its kind in the region and connects the Wazir Bagh locality to Lal Chowk, easing pedestrian movement and reducing ferry dependency. The bridge played a key role in decongesting nearby roadways and enhancing walkability in the city center. In 2019, it was upgraded with programmable RGB facade lighting under the Srinagar Smart City initiative to improve its nighttime visibility and aesthetics.

== History ==
The Lal Mandi Footbridge, completed on 13 July 2005, was the first suspension-type pedestrian bridge across the Jhelum River in Srinagar, linking the Wazir Bagh area to the city centre at Lal Chowk. It was constructed over two years under the PDP-Congress government led by Mufti Mohammed Sayeed, easing pedestrian dependency on shikara ferries and reducing congestion on nearby road bridges. In October 2019, the footbridge was equipped with facade lighting, including programmable RGB luminaires and 21 kV backup, under the Srinagar Smart City project to enhance its nighttime appearance alongside other key bridges.

== Structure ==
The Lal Mandi Footbridge lies between the coordinates 34°4'4.16"N and 34°4'7.34"N, with UTM positions ranging from 482719.36 to 482670.777. It is a 120.97-long suspension-type pedestrian bridge with a width of 4 meters, allowing safe crossing for pedestrians and cyclists. The bridge comprises three piers, each spaced with a horizontal clearance of 35 meters, and maintains a vertical clearance of 0.7 meters above the high flood level (HFL).

== See also ==
- Zero Bridge
- Abdullah Bridge
- Amira Kadal
- JK Krishi Vikas Cooperative Ltd.

== Gallery ==
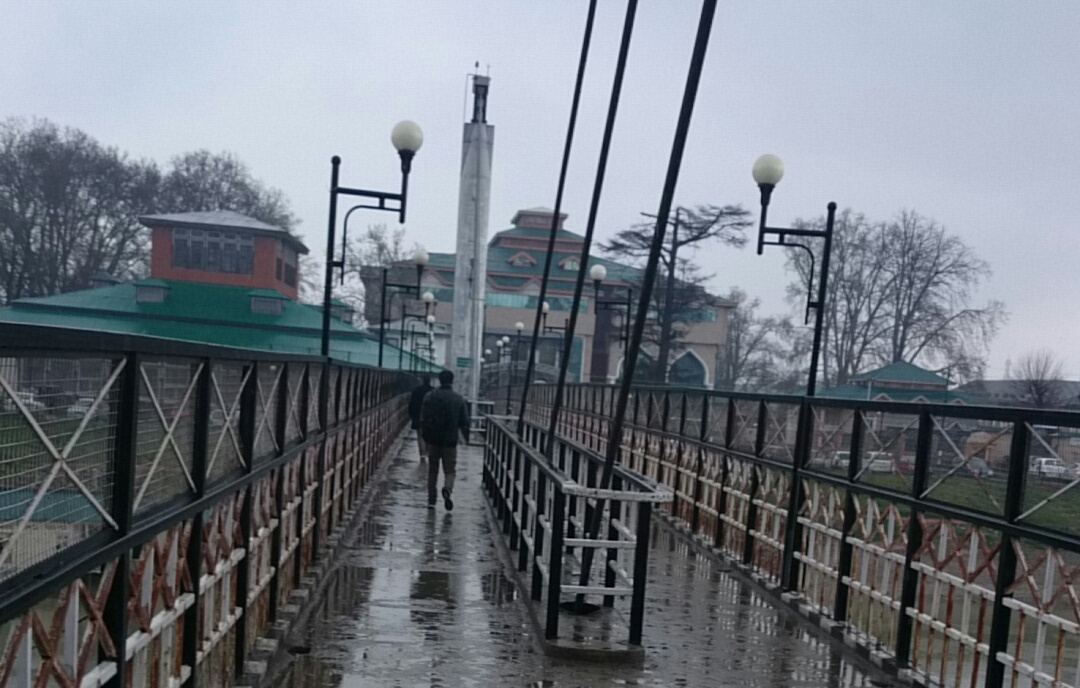
A view of Footbridge.

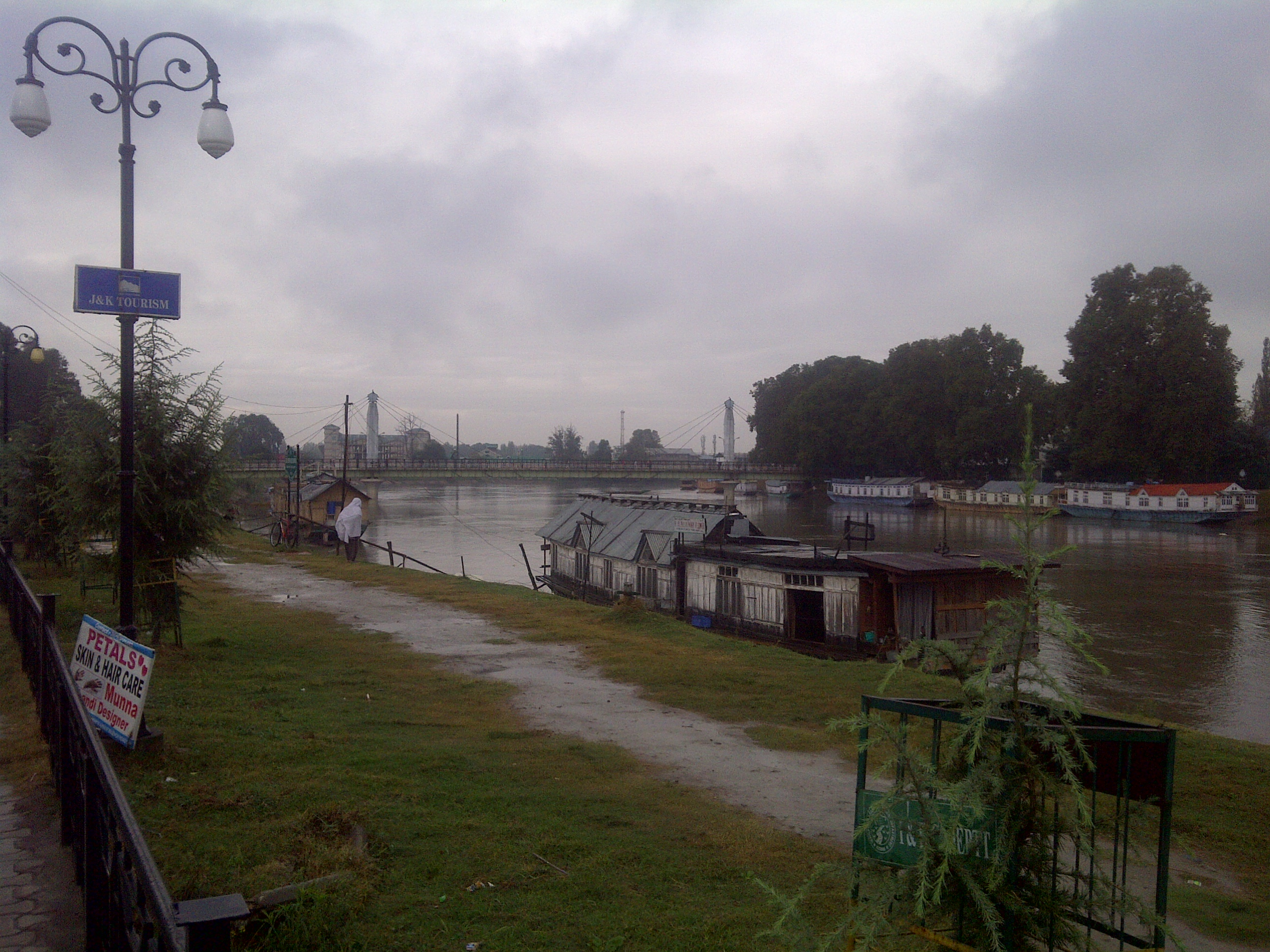
Footbridge and Jhelum.

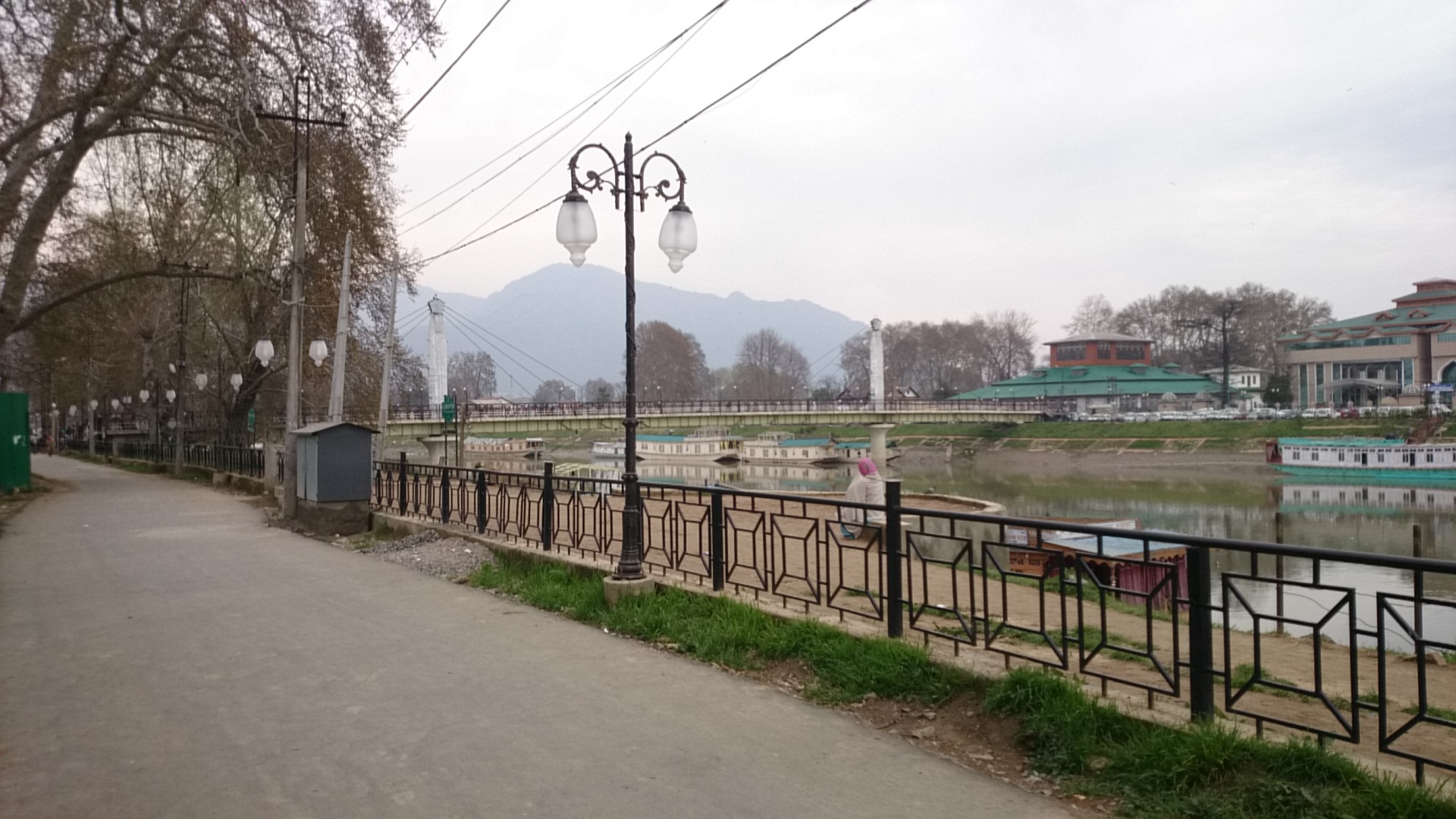
Footbridge connecting Abi Guzar Bund and Silk Factory road.

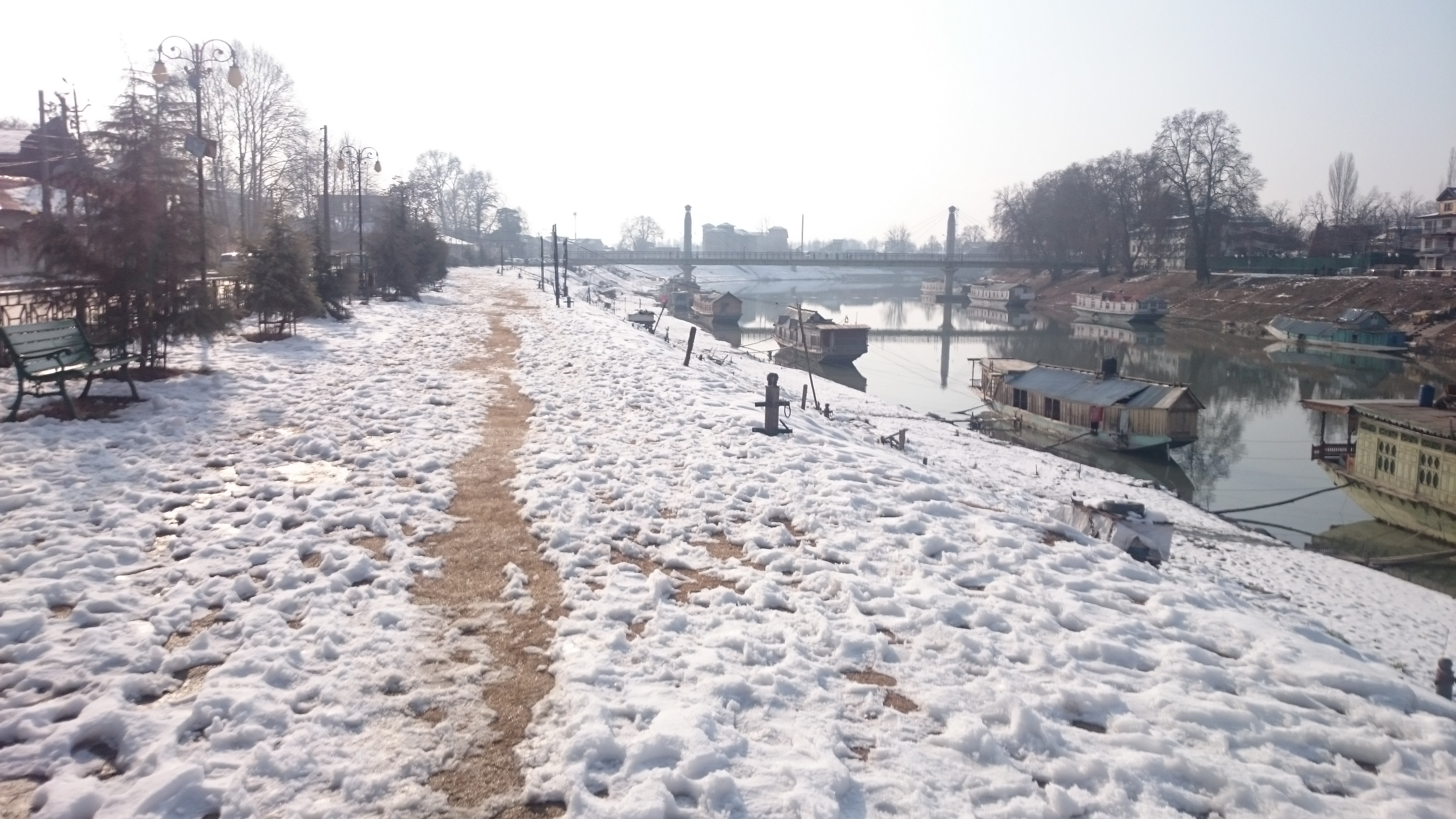
A view of Footbridge during winter.
