= Hamals =

Tribe from Kashmir

Hamals is a tribe which comes from Kashmir. They have a very long history of building Kashmir. The caste is a low one, and all the people used to work at the Ration Ghats. Most of the population is in old Kashmir.

People are very friendly and normally live with the joint families. The Hamals' ancestors had milk businesses, so they were mostly milkmen. Now many of them work as headloaders. They contributed quite a lot to the economy of Kashmir as they belonged to the working class. Their work can be seen in Habba Kadal, the well known area on the Ghats of Jehlum.
