= New Habba Kadal =

Bridge in India

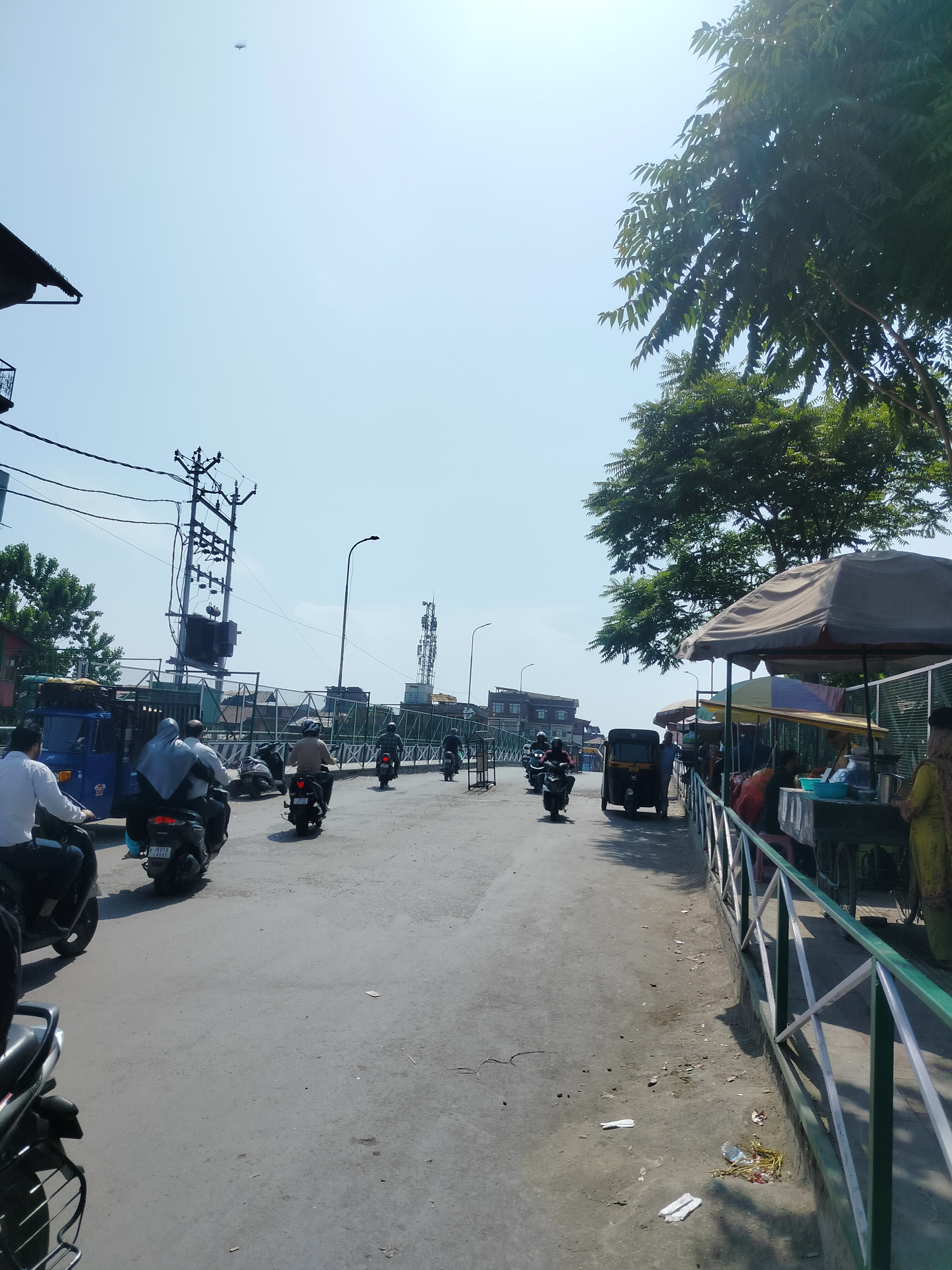
- View of new Habba Kadal Bridge
- Coordinates: 34°4′53.16″N 74°48′21.47″E
- Carries: Motor Vehicles, Bicycles, Pedestrians
- Crosses: Jhelum
- Locale: Srinagar, Jammu and Kashmir, India
- Named for: Sultan Habib Shah
- Preceded by: Budshah Bridge
- Followed by: Habba Kadal

Characteristics
- Material: Concrete
- Total length: 100 metres (330 ft)
- Width: 12 metres (39 ft)

History
- Opened: 2001
- Replaces: Habba Kadal

New Habba Kadal is a concrete bridge located in the old city of Srinagar, in the Indian state of Jammu and Kashmir. It was built in 2001 to replace the original Habba Kadal bridge which is a wooden structure first built in 1551. The old bridge is one of the seven original bridges that have existed in the city for a long time and it still exists a few metres downstream of the new bridge.

In 2018, the New Habba Kadal bridge was fenced on either side to prevent people from throwing garbage and other waste into the Jhelum river.

== See also ==
- Abdullah Bridge
- Amira Kadal
- Budshah Bridge
