= Tsoont Kol =

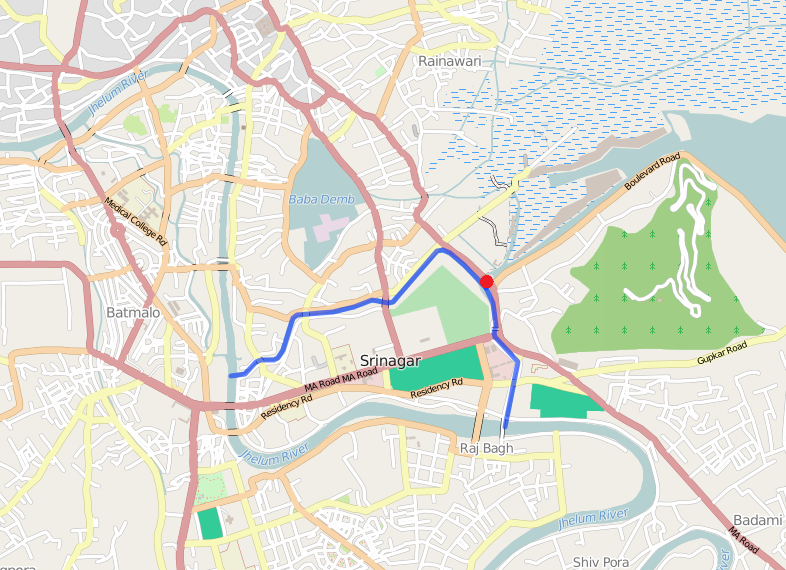
- Tsoont Kol highlighted in blue, with the Dal lock marked in red.

Specifications
- Length: 2.22 miles (3.57 km)
- Maximum height above sea level: 5,215 ft (1,590 m)
- Status: active

Geography
- Start point: Jhelum River
- End point: Jhelum River
- Connects to: Dal Lake

Tsoont Kol (Urdu pronunciation: [t͡ʃũːʈ koːl] ; Kashmiri pronunciation: [t͡sũːʈʰʲ kɔl], literally 'Apple Stream') is a navigational canal running through the Srinagar city of the Indian state of Jammu and Kashmir, that also helps to regulate the water level in the Dal lake. It branches out from the Jhelum just near the northern end of the Zero Bridge and rejoins it in the Maisuma locality of the old city, a few metres downstream of the Budshah Bridge. It has a lock gate known as Dal Gate to regulate the water level in the Dal lake which is located at a slightly higher elevation. The canal also has an island just after the Dal Gate, known as Chinar Bagh.

== History ==
The canal has existed since ancient times when it bore the name "Mahasarit". Its main purpose has always been to take the surplus waters of the Dal lake into the Jhelum. The canal gets its name from the Kashmiri word for quince, "bamb-tsoont", as there were many quince trees on its banks.
