= Habba Kadal =

Bridge in India

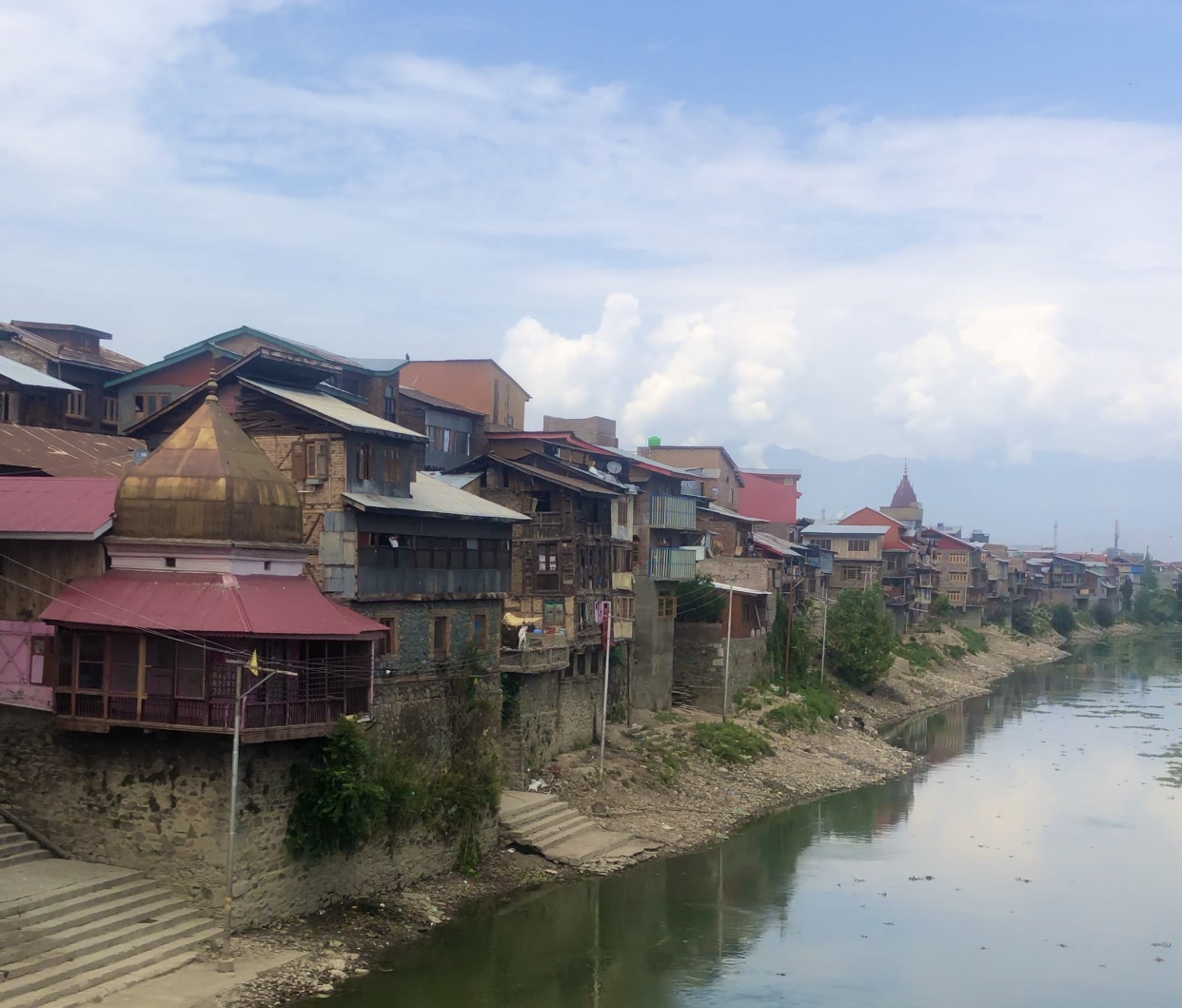
- View of the Ghats from Habba Kadal
- Coordinates: 34°4′55.05″N 74°48′21.70″E
- Carries: Motor Vehicles, Bicycles, Pedestrians
- Crosses: Jhelum
- Locale: Srinagar, Jammu and Kashmir, India
- Named for: Sultan Habib Shah
- Preceded by: New Habba Kadal
- Followed by: New Fateh Kadal

Characteristics
- Material: Wood
- Total length: 80 metres (260 ft)
- Width: 7 metres (23 ft)

History
- Opened: 1551
- Rebuilt: After the floods of 1893, Renovated 2013-15

Location
- Interactive map of Habba Kadal

Habba Kadal (Urdu pronunciation: [ɦəbbɑː kəd̪əl] ; Kashmiri pronunciation: [habɨ kəd̪ɨl]) is a wooden bridge located in the old city of Srinagar, in Jammu and Kashmir, India that crosses the Jhelum river. It was first built in 1551 by Sultan Habib Shah of the Shah Miri Dynasty and is one of the seven original bridges that have existed in the city for a long time. It had to be rebuilt during Dogra rule after the heavy floods of 1893. Although originally planned to be dismantled as the New Habba Kadal bridge made it redundant, the government, as part of its policy of preserving heritage, undertook renovation of the bridge. It was started in 2013 and took two years to complete. Finally, the bridge again opened to the public in 2015.

== See also ==
- New Habba Kadal
- Amira Kadal
- Budshah Bridge
