= Budshah Bridge =

Bridge in India

- Coordinates: 34°4′17.71″N 74°48′24.13″E
- Carries: Motor Vehicles, Bicycles, Pedestrians
- Crosses: Jhelum
- Locale: Srinagar, Jammu and Kashmir, India
- Named for: Zain-ul-Abidin Budshah
- Preceded by: Amira Kadal
- Followed by: New Habba Kadal

Characteristics
- Material: Concrete
- Total length: 100 metres (330 ft)
- Width: 25 metres (82 ft)

History
- Opened: 1957

Budshah Bridge, locally also known as Budshah Kadal, is a concrete bridge located in the Srinagar city of the Indian union territory of Jammu and Kashmir. It was first built in 1957 during the rule of Bakshi Ghulam Mohammad and is named after the 15th Century ruler of Kashmir, Zain-ul-Abidin, popularly known as Budshah (the Great King).

The bridge is also known as Alamgir Bridge. It is located more than 100 metres downstream of Amira Kadal and handles most of the vehicular traffic from the Civil Secretariat to the Maulana Azad Road. In 2017, colourful fountains were installed on either side of the bridge as part of a beautification programme for the city.

== See also ==
- Zero Bridge
- Abdullah Bridge
- Amira Kadal
