= Zero Bridge =

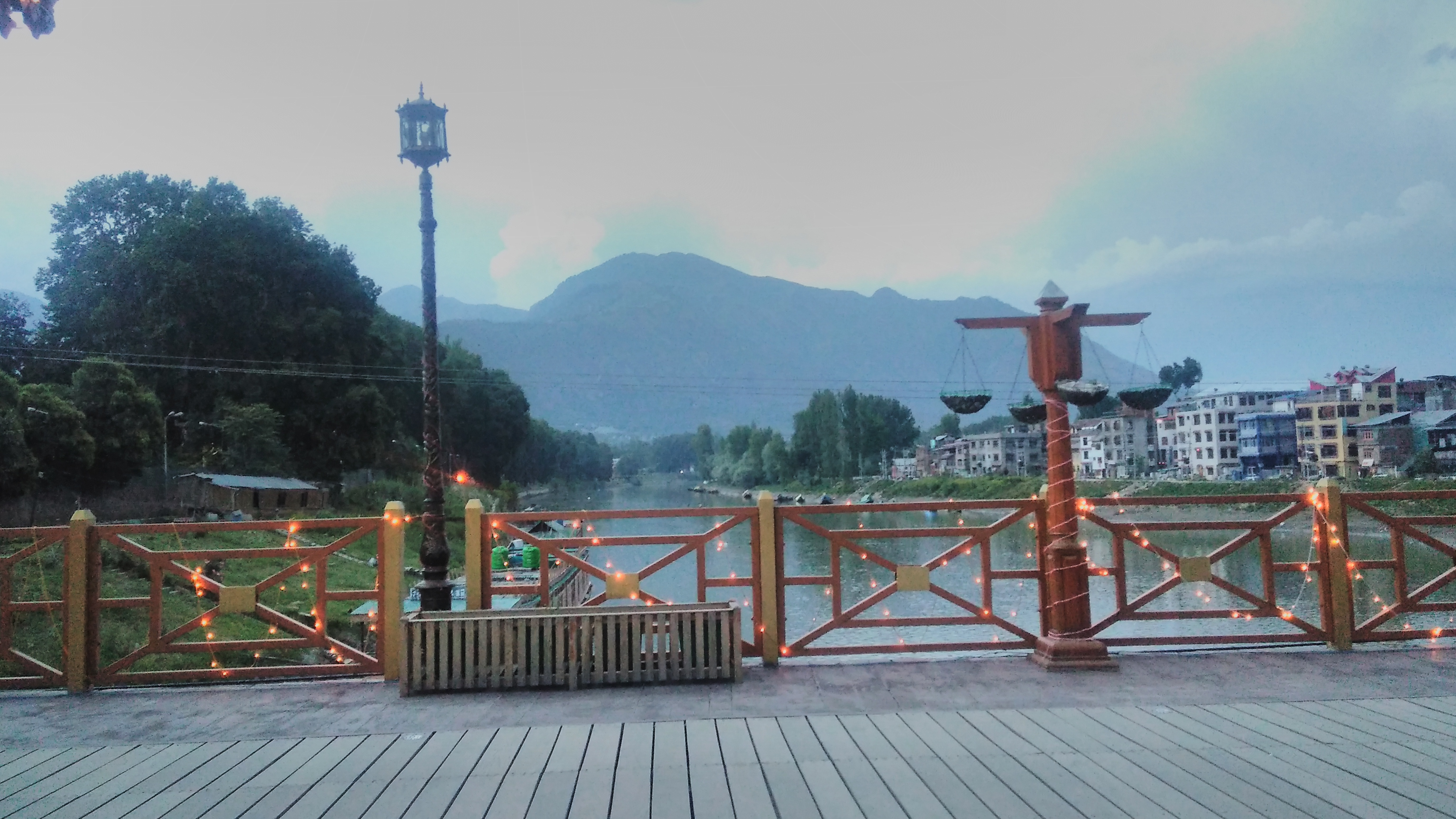
- Coordinates: 34°4′11.23″N 74°49′48″E
- Carries: Pedestrian pathway
- Crosses: Jhelum
- Locale: Srinagar, Jammu and Kashmir, India
- Followed by: Abdullah Bridge

Characteristics
- Design: Wooden Arch Bridge
- Material: Wood
- Total length: 160 metres (520 ft)
- Width: 9 metres (30 ft)

History
- Opened: 1950s
- Closed: Late 1980s (vehicular traffic)

Location
- Interactive map of Zero Bridge

The Zero Bridge (Urdu pronunciation: [ziːɾoː bɾɪd͡ʒ] ; Kashmiri pronunciation: [zərʲ kəd̪ɨl]) is a wooden arch bridge located in the city of Srinagar in the Indian union territory of Jammu and Kashmir. It crosses the Jhelum river in a roughly North-South direction connecting Sonwar in the north to Rajbagh in the South. Originally constructed in the late 1950s under the then chief minister Bakshi Ghulam Mohammad, the bridge was closed for vehicular traffic in the late 1980s owing to the weakening of its wooden structure.

== Etymology ==
Officially it is said to have been named Zero Bridge since traditionally the Amira Kadal bridge was regarded as the first bridge on the Jhelum as it entered Srinagar and the Zero bridge preceded this 'first' bridge.

== Current status ==
Zero bridge in Srinagar

The Zero Bridge is still the first bridge downstream of the Jhelum while entering the Srinagar city and the next upstream crossing is located near Pantha Chowk in the city outskirts. At present, the old wooden structure of the bridge is being replaced by a new one, preserving the original architecture and the bridge would continue to be a pedestrian crossing and a heritage site. The vehicular traffic is currently handled by the Abdullah Bridge, located roughly 200 metres downstream.
