= Abdullah Bridge =

- Coordinates: 34°4′12″N 74°49′40.55″E
- Carries: Motor Vehicles, Bicycles, Pedestrians
- Crosses: Jhelum
- Locale: Srinagar, Jammu and Kashmir, India
- Named for: Sheikh Muhammad Abdullah
- Preceded by: Zero Bridge
- Followed by: Lal Mandi Footbridge

Characteristics
- Material: Concrete
- Total length: 390 metres (1,280 ft)
- Width: 14 metres (46 ft)

History
- Opened: 1990s
- Replaces: Zero Bridge

Abdullah Bridge is a concrete bridge located in the city of Srinagar in the Indian union territory of Jammu and Kashmir. It is a relatively new bridge replacing the nearby Zero Bridge to connect Sonwar Bagh and Rajbagh. It is named after Sheikh Mohammad Abdullah, a prominent politician from Kashmir. The bridge was constructed by JKPCC under the supervision of Er Mohammed Amin Shah.

== See also ==
- Zero Bridge
