= Amira Kadal =

Historical bridge in India

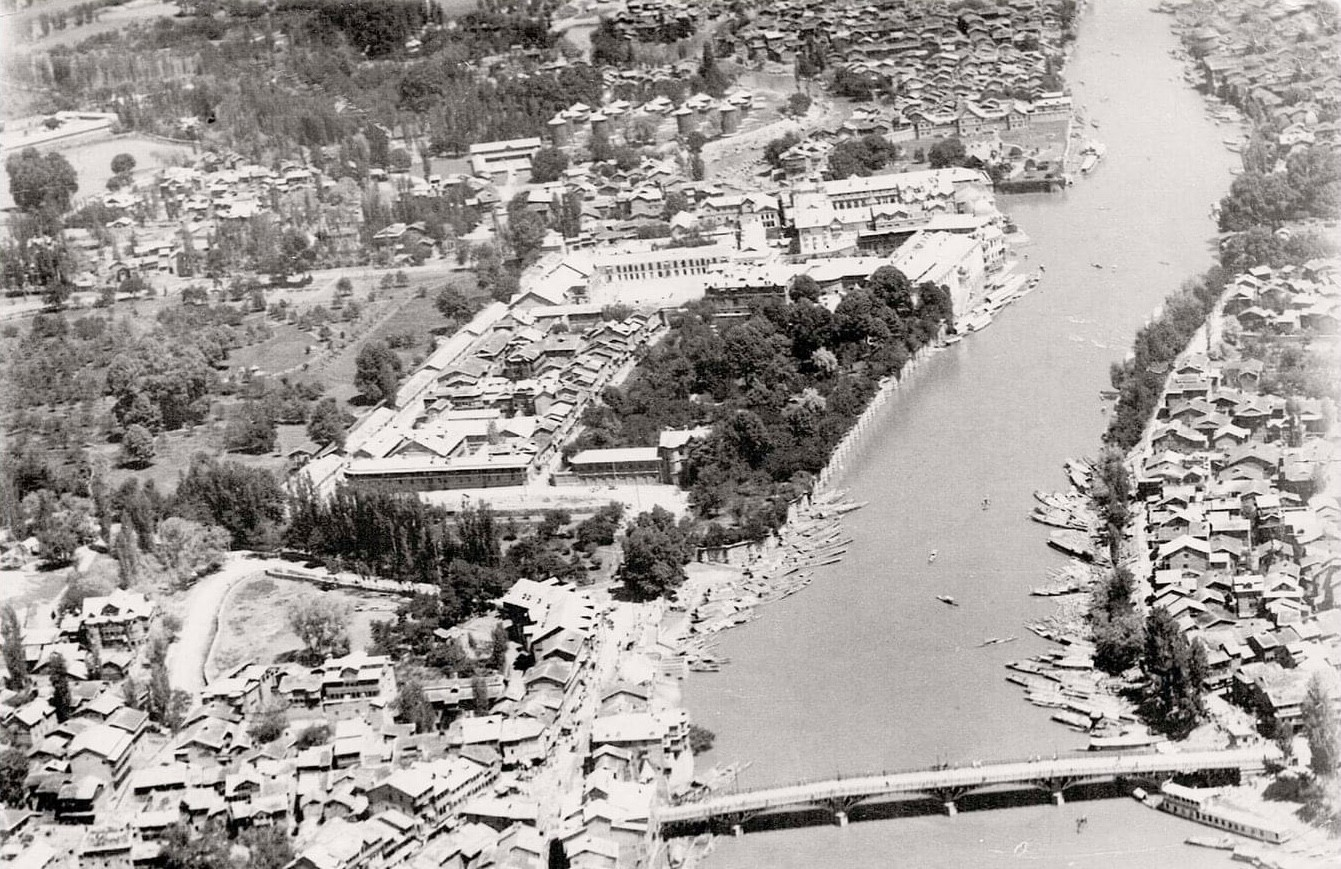
- Coordinates: 34.0697°N 74.8070°E
- Carries: Motor Vehicles
- Crosses: Jhelum River
- Locale: Srinagar, Jammu and Kashmir, India
- Named for: Aamir Khan Jawan Sher Afghani
- Followed by: Budshah Bridge

Characteristics
- Design: Beam

History
- Construction start: 1774
- Construction end: 1777

Location
- Location within Srinagar

Amira Kadal (Urdu pronunciation: [əmiːɾɑː kəd̪əl] ; Kashmiri pronunciation: [əmraː kəd̪ɨl]) is a bridge built in 1774–77 by the Afghan Governor Amir Khan Sher Jawan.

The wooden bridge near the city centre of Lal Chowk over the Jhelum river was renovated with a budget of Rs.7.17 crore in March 2025. It is one of the seven historical bridges of Srinagar.

The Amira Kadal Bridge also referred to as the "first Bridge" is a relatively newer one if compared with the rest of the six bridges.This bridge has been witness to many events of historical importance.

== History ==
It was originally constructed in 1774 Amir Khan Jawan Sher, the Afghan governor of Kashmir under the Durrani Empire.

Titled "Diler Jang" by the Afghan ruler Timur Shah Durrani, Amir Khan did not seek help from outside Princes, but sought the help of Hanjis (boatmen) who were a sturdy class of people capable of answering his purpose.

With their help, he built the Amira Kadal bridge and the mansion called Sher Garhi Palace on the banks of the River Jhelum.

The development of Amirabad Garden on the western shores of Dal Lake and the construction of the Amira Kadal bridge portray him as an ambitious builder. These projects, however, also tend to overshadow his reputation as a vandal who demolished royal palaces and other buildings around Dal Lake, structures that had taken the Mughals and their nobles 170 years to construct.

From the pitiless Afghan tax-collectors flogging their way to extract zar-i-habubat (tax from farmers) to the footfalls of the hob-nailed boots of Dogras scaring the masses away the Amirakadal bridge has been a doubtless witness to the history of Kashmir.

== Gallery ==
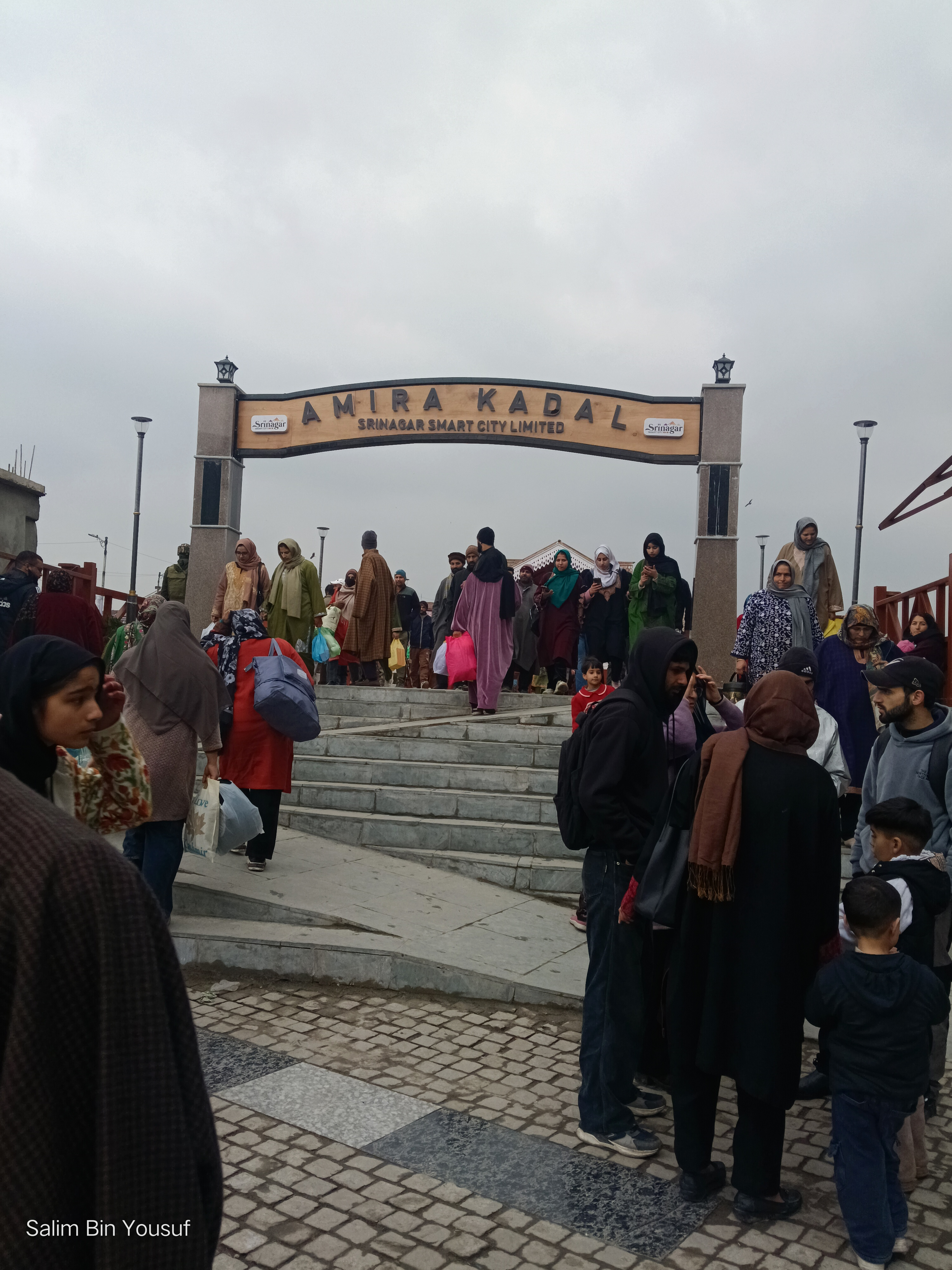
Reconstructed Amira Kadal Lal chowk Srinagar
